= M-98 (Michigan highway) =

Former state highway in Schoolcraft and Luce counties in Michigan, United States

M-98
- M-98 highlighted in red on a modern map

Route information
- Maintained by MSHD
- Length: 16.2 mi (26.1 km)
- Existed: c. July 1, 1919–c. 1960

Major junctions
- West end: M-77 in Germfask
- M-135 in Helmer
- East end: M-28 near McMillan

Location
- Country: United States
- State: Michigan
- Counties: Schoolcraft, Luce

Highway system
- Michigan State Trunkline Highway System; Interstate; US; State; Byways
← M-97	→ M-99

M-98 is the designation of a former 16.2-mile (26.1 km) state trunkline highway in the Upper Peninsula of the US state of Michigan. It ran between M-77 at Germfask and M-28 near McMillan. The highway connected both small towns situated around Manistique Lake when it was designated with the rest of the original state highways in 1919. The section north of Helmer on the east side of the lake ran concurrently with M-135 after the latter's creation in the late 1920s. M-98 was extended at the end of the 1940s before the whole trunkline was removed from the highway system in the 1960s. Since the 1970s, part of M-98 has been designated as one of the two County Road H-44s in the state.

== Route description ==
M-98 started at a junction with M-77 in Germfask next to the Seney National Wildlife Refuge, a managed wetland in Schoolcraft County. The highway followed Ten Curves Road east and then north out town. The trunkline turned back due east and crosses the Fox River before a set of curves that shifted the highway along the Schoolcraft–Luce county line to pass north of Big Manistique Lake. Ten Curves Road passes between the Big and North Manistee lakes as it enters the community of Helmer in Luce County. There, M-98 intersected M-135, and the two ran concurrently north along Manistique Lakes Road. M-98/M-135 turned due east to intersect M-28 southwest of McMillan near East Lake.

== History ==
M-98 was first designated by July 1, 1919, at the same time as the initial state highway system was signed. In 1929, M-135 was designated, creating the concurrency along the last several miles of M-98. By 1936, a series of corners were straightened out on the western end of M-98 near Germfask. In late 1949 or early 1950, M-28 was realigned to take an angled route southeasterly out of McMillan. The east–west section of the previous M-28 routing was added to M-98 while the north–south segment was added to M-135. By the middle of 1958, M-135 was shifted to follow M-98, removing the roadway section added to its routing previously; this change made M-98 and M-135 concurrent north of Helmer all the way to M-28 once again. M-98 was removed from the state trunkline system in late 1960 or early 1961, and the designation was decommissioned at that time. The M-98 designation has not been reused since. The routing was then assigned as a County Road H-44 after October 5, 1970, along the east–west section of the former M-98. The former M-98/M-135 was given the H-33 moniker at the same time. Both roads have retained those designations ever since.

== Major intersections ==
County	Location	mi	km	Destinations	Notes
Schoolcraft	Germfask	0.0	0.0	M-77 – Blaney Park, Seney	Former western terminus
Luce	Helmer	11.5	18.5	M-135 south – Curtis	Modern day H-33; southern end of M-135 concurrency
Luce	McMillan	16.2	26.1	M-28 – Munising, Newberry M-135 south	Former eastern terminus
1.000 mi = 1.609 km; 1.000 km = 0.621 mi: Concurrency terminus
