= Portage Township, Mackinac County, Michigan =

Civil township in Michigan, United States

Portage Township, Michigan
- Civil township
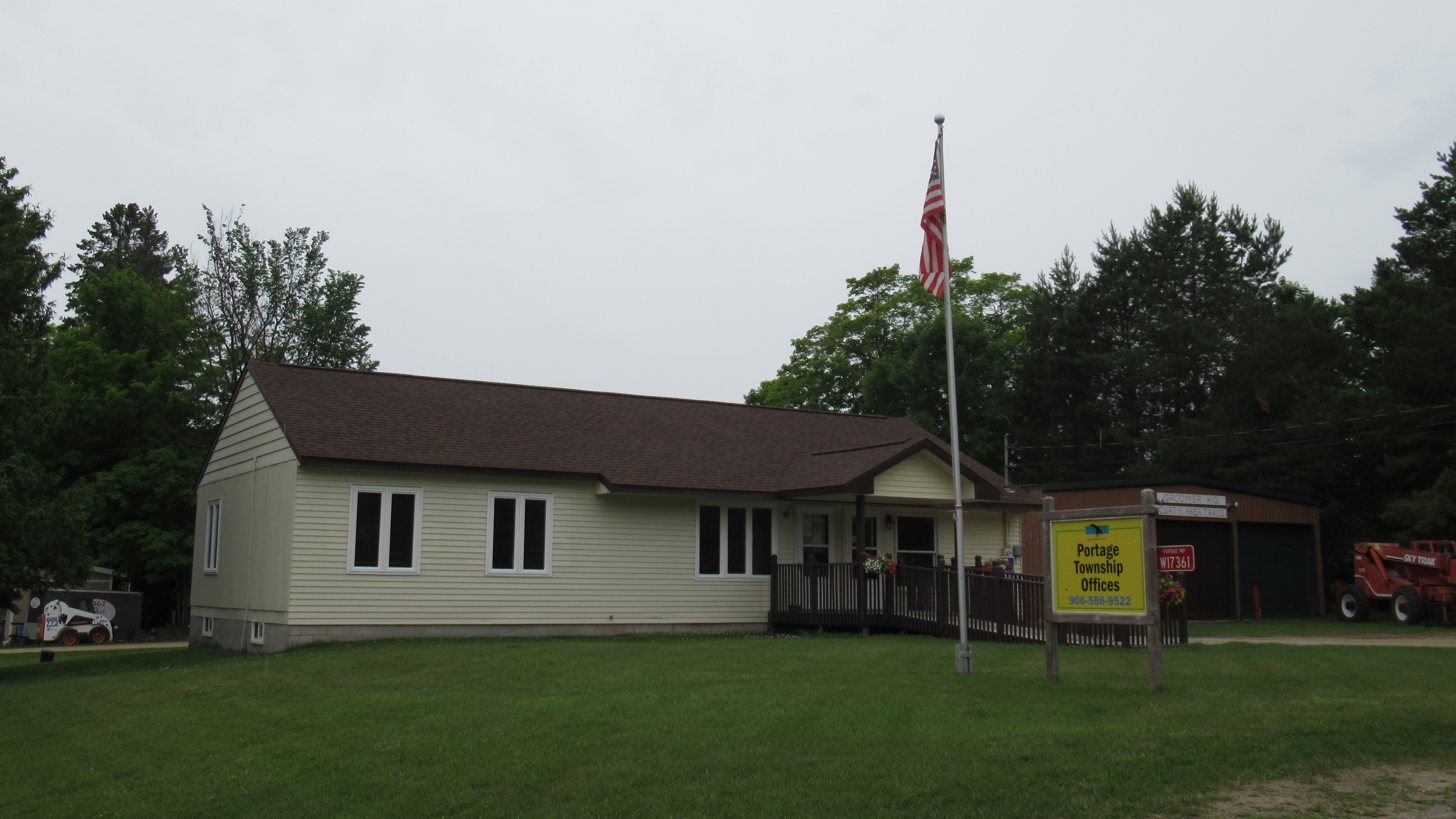
- Portage Township Offices in Curtis

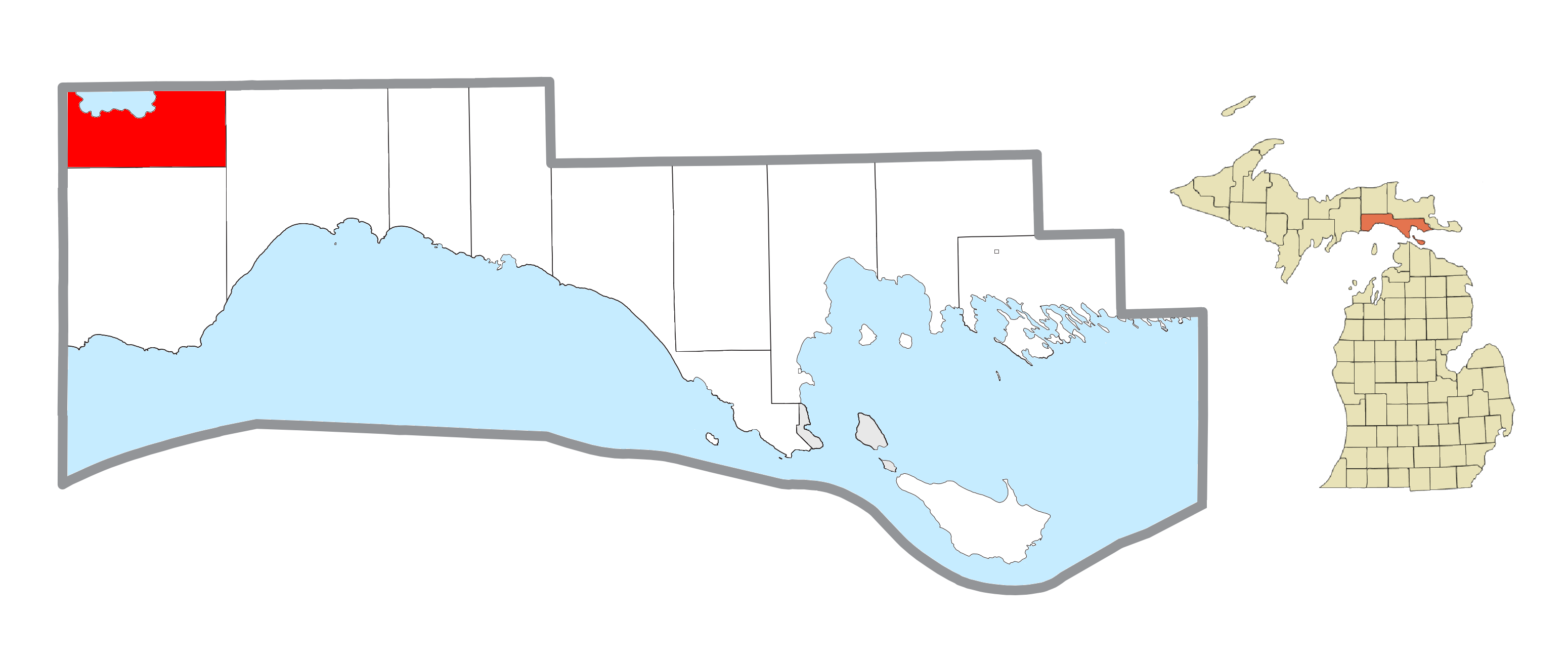
- Location within Mackinac County

- Location within the state of Michigan Location within the United States
- Coordinates: 46°12′19″N 85°44′14″W
- Country: United States
- State: Michigan
- County: Mackinac

Government
  - Supervisor: Stephen Sicinski
  - Clerk: Patricia MacLachlan

Area
  - Total: 72.26 sq mi (187.15 km^{2})
  - Land: 55.43 sq mi (143.56 km^{2})
  - Water: 16.83 sq mi (43.59 km^{2})
- Elevation: 696 ft (212 m)

Population (2020)
  - Total: 907
  - Density: 17.7/sq mi (6.8/km^{2})
- Time zone: UTC-5 (Eastern (EST))
  - Summer (DST): UTC-4 (EDT)
- ZIP Codes: 49820 (Curtis); 49827 (Engadine); 49836 (Germfask); 49838 (Gould City); 49853 (McMillan)
- Area code: 906
- FIPS code: 26-65600
- GNIS feature ID: 1626927
- Website: https://www.portagetwp.org/

Portage Township is a civil township of Mackinac County in the U.S. state of Michigan. As of the 2020 census, its population was 907, down from 981 in 2010.

== Geography ==
Portage Township occupies the northwest corner of Mackinac County, 60 miles (97 km) northwest of St. Ignace, the county seat. The township is bordered to the north by Luce County and to the west by Schoolcraft County.

According to the U.S. Census Bureau, the township has a total area of 72.26 square miles (187.15 km^{2}), of which 55.43 square miles (143.56 km^{2}) are land and 16.83 square miles (43.59 km^{2}) (23.29%) are water.

=== Major highways ===
- H-33
- H-42

=== Communities ===
- Curtis is an unincorporated community located on an isthmus between Manistique Lake and South Manistique Lake at 46°12′21″N 85°44′43″W.

== Demographics ==
As of 2020, its population was 907.

== Gallery ==
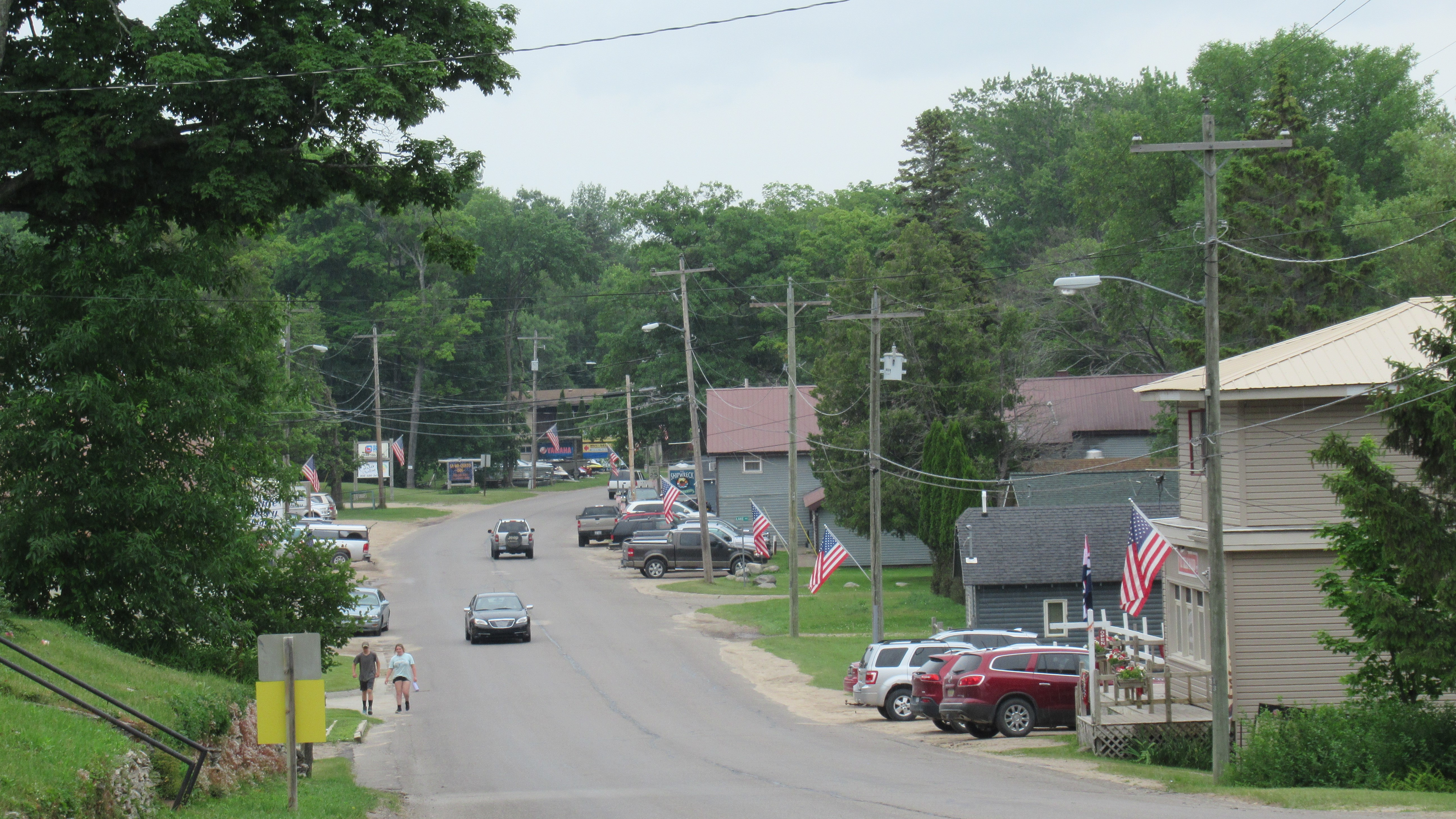
Unincorporated community of Curtis

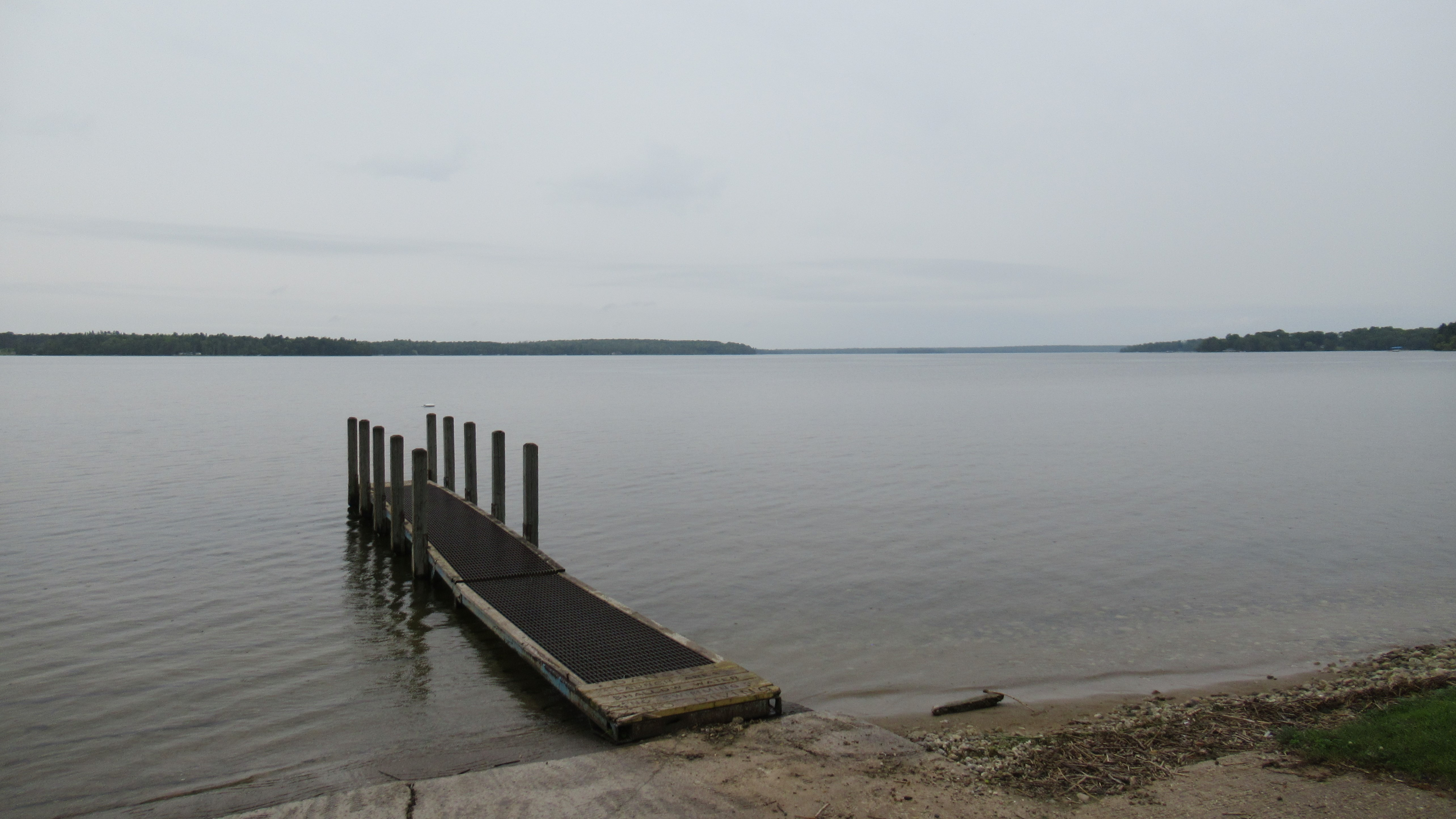
South Manistique Lake

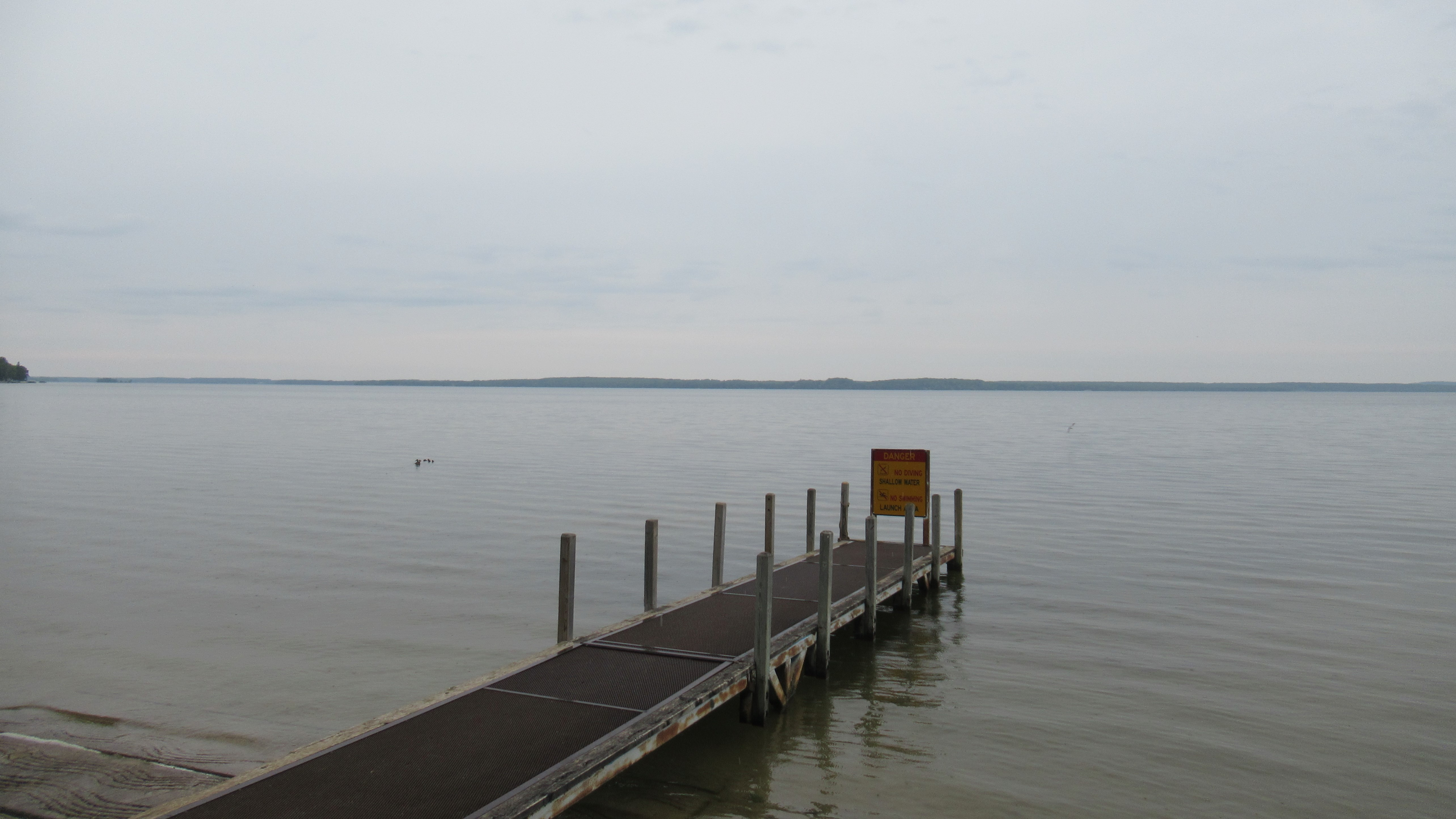
Manistique Lake
