= Helmer, Michigan =

- Unincorporated community
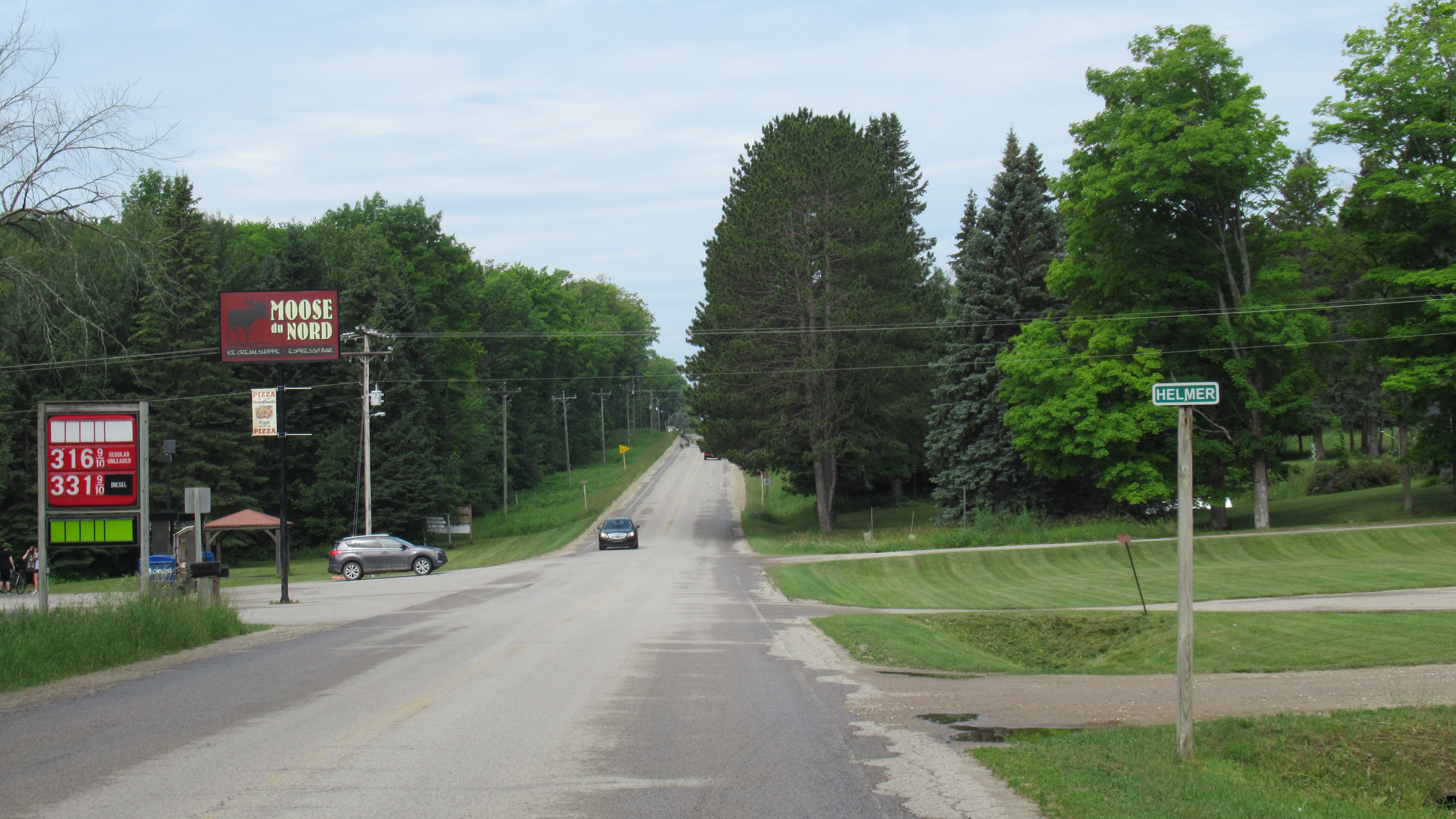
- Helmer signage looking west along H-44

- Location within the state of Michigan Location within the United States
- Coordinates: 46°15′59″N 85°42′56″W
- Country: United States
- State: Michigan
- County: Luce
- Township: Lakefield
- Settled: 1881
- Established: 1894
- Elevation: 689 ft (210 m)
- Time zone: UTC-5 (Eastern (EST))
  - Summer (DST): UTC-4 (EDT)
- ZIP code(s): 49853 (McMillan)
- Area code: 906
- GNIS feature ID: 628066

Helmer is an unincorporated community in Luce County in the U.S. state of Michigan. The community is located within Lakefield Township. As an unincorporated community, Helmer has no legally defined boundaries or population statistics of its own.

== History ==
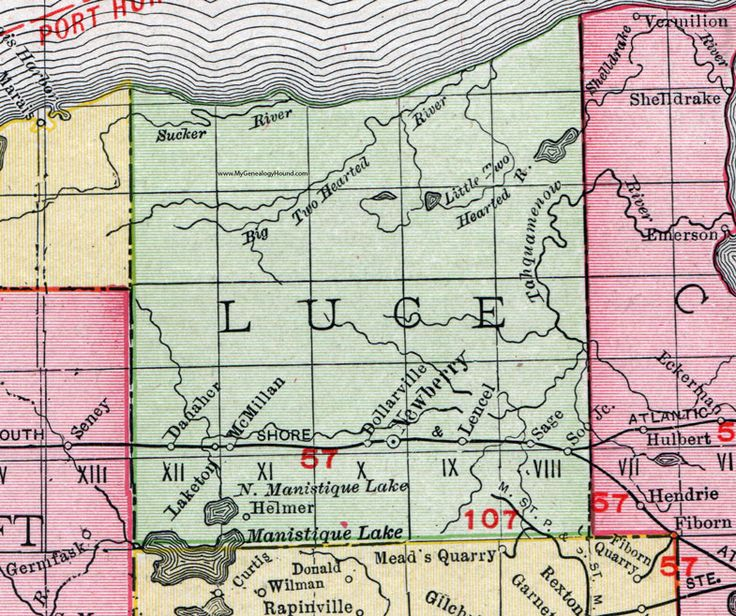
Helmer appearing on a Luce County map from 1911

The area was first settled as early as 1881 when Presbyterian minister Roy Mills built a mission house along Helmer Creek. At the time, the area was part of western Chippewa County until Luce County was created in 1887.

Helmer received its first post office on March 19, 1894 with Gaylord Helmer serving as the first postmaster until March 19, 1899. Charles Fyvie served as postmaster from June 25, 1907 until the Helmer post office was discontinued on September 30, 1914. The post office served as a rural branch of the McMillan post office until it was ultimately discontinued in 1920.

When the railway industry began constructing lines through the Upper Peninsula near the end of the century, Helmer did not have railroad access, and the nearest railway depot was to the north in McMillan. Helmer served as a small resort community with a stagecoach stop for travelers. Road access to Helmer was limited until M-98 was commissioned in 1919, which connected Helmer to M-77 to the west and M-28 to the northeast. In 1929, M-135 was commissioned to further connect Helmer to M-28 and also U.S. Route 2 to the south. Both M-98 and M-135 were decommissioned in 1960 and turned over to county control and are now known as H-44 and H-33 respectively.

Helmer continues to exist as an unincorporated community within Lakefield Township and contains a small population and a few businesses. The East Lakefield Cemetery is located near Helmer just to the east. It is an active cemetery with its earliest grave dating back to 1900.

=== Helmer House Inn ===
Helmer House Inn
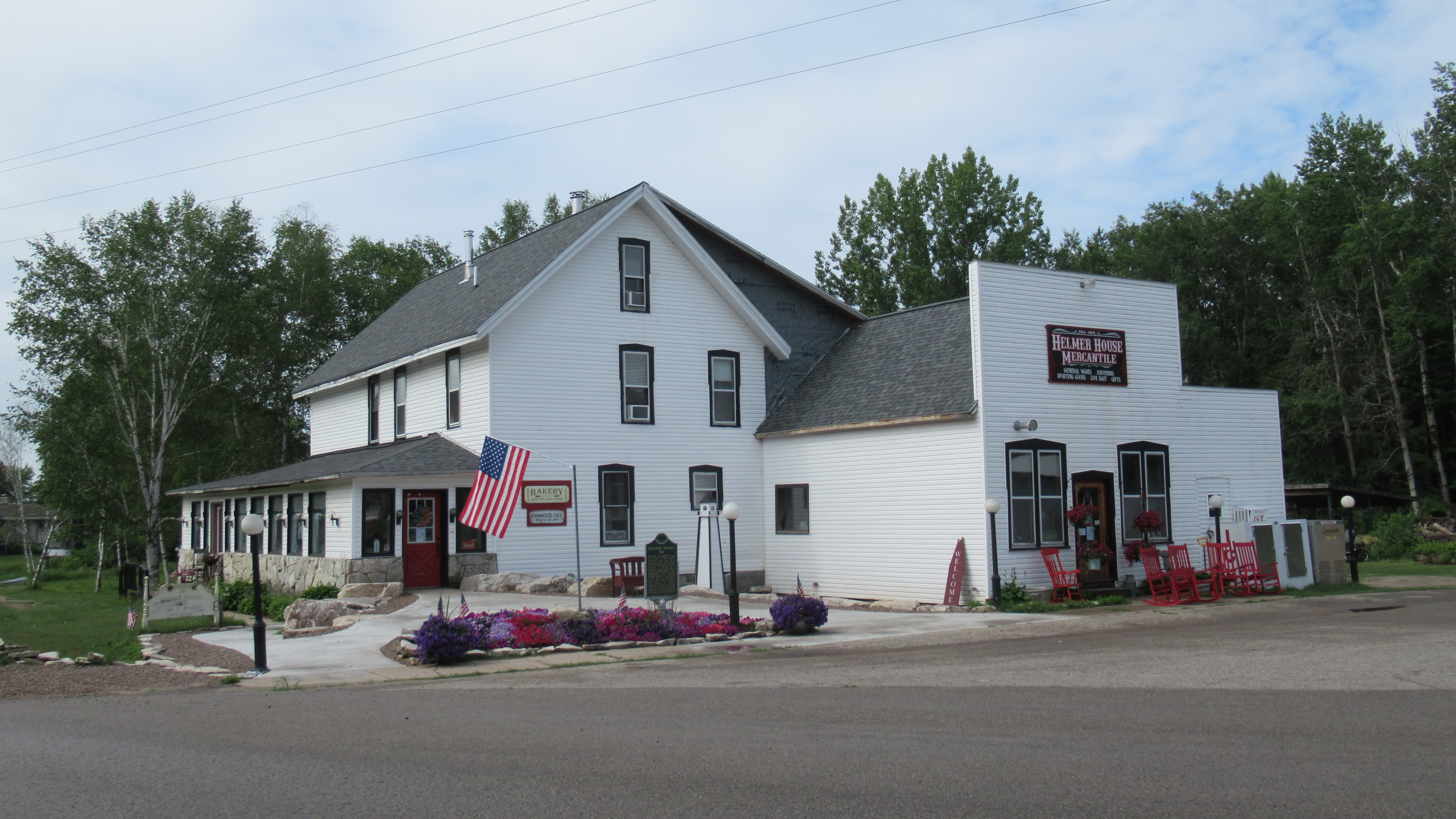
- Helmer House Inn in June 2021
- Interactive map of Helmer House Inn
- 46°16′13″N 85°43′08″W
- Location: 2747 County Road 377; McMillan, Michigan

History
- Built: 1881

Michigan State Historic Site
- Designated: January 13, 1982

The most notable structure within the community of Helmer is the Helmer House Inn, which is located along Helmer Creek just north of Manistique Lake at 2747 Helmer Road (County Road 377). The building was constructed in 1881–1882 as a mission house and manse by Roy Mills of the Presbyterian church from Newberry. It served in this capacity until 1888 when it was purchased by local sheriff Gaylord Helmer. He converted the structure into a general store and hotel. In 1894, Helmer added a second structure to the original house to accommodate more travelers, as well as housing the community's first post office with himself as postmaster.

In 1904, the general store was purchased by Charles and Jeanie Fyvie. The Helmer post office, which was established in 1894, was located within the structure until it was ultimately discontinued as a rural branch in 1920. The Fyvie family continued to live there and operated the hotel and general store until it closed in 1950. After it closed, it remained unused and fell into disrepair. The structure was restored in 1981 and reopened as a hotel to commemorate its centennial anniversary. It was then designated as a Michigan State Historic Site on January 13, 1982. A state historic marker was also erected on the site.

The hotel closed down a few years later, and the building became neglected and fell into disrepair again. In 2017, the building was at risk of being demolished until local residents James and Kristen Handrich purchased and restored the structure by the following year. The building reopened in 2020 as the Helmer House Inn & Cafe, which serves as a bakery and provides bed and breakfast accommodations. In 2020, the Helmer House Inn & Cafe was awarded as having the Upper Peninsula's best doughnuts.

== Geography ==
Helmer is a small community located within Lakefield Township in the state's Upper Peninsula about 15 miles (24.1 km) west of the village of Newberry. The community is surrounded by portions of the Sault Ste. Marie section of the Lake Superior State Forest. Helmer sits at an elevation of 689 feet (210 m) above sea level.

Helmer is located along the northeast shores of Manistique Lake along H-33 (Manistique Lakes Road) and the western terminus of H-44 (Ten Curves Road). Aside from Newberry, the nearest sizable communities include McMillan to the north, Curtis to the south, Engadine to the southeast, and Germfask and Seney to the west. M-28 crosses east–west about 6 miles (9.7 km) to the north, and M-117 runs south–north about 10 miles (16.1 km) to the east.

Helmer no longer contains its own post office and uses the McMillan 49853 ZIP Code. The community is served by Tahquamenon Area Schools in Newberry, which serves the entire county itself and has the largest area of any public school district in the state.

Along with Manistique Lake, other nearby geographic features include the short Helmer Creek, which connects Manistique Lake to North Manistique Lake to the north. Locke Creek is the only tributary of Helmer Creek and joins the creek within the community. Fork Lake and Fork Creek are small waterways that serve as tributaries connecting to the northeastern portion of Manistique Lake near Helmer.

== Gallery ==
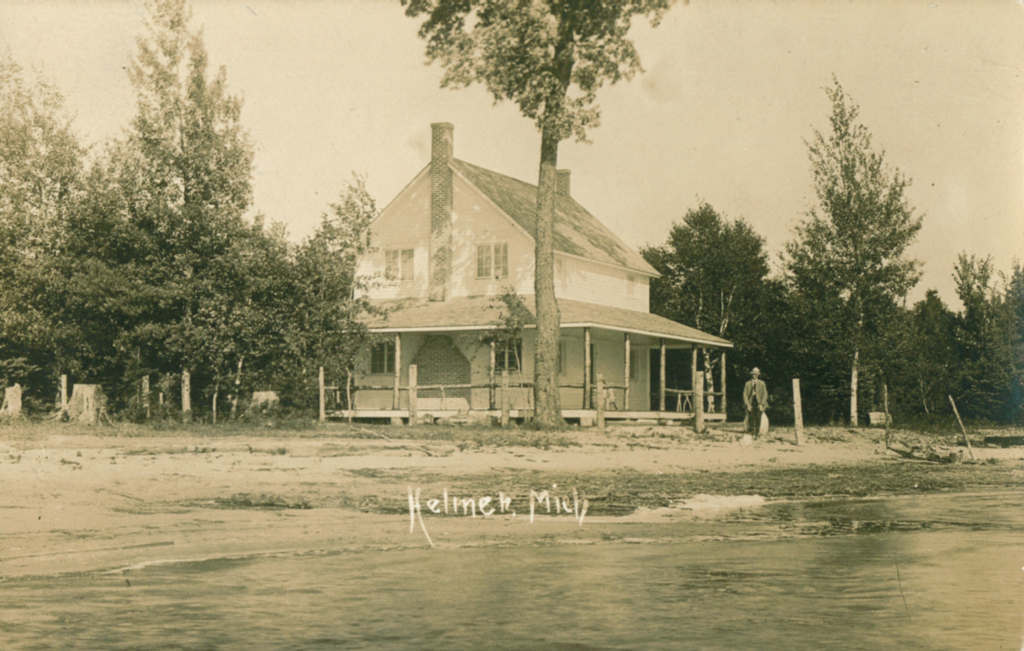
Helmer House Inn in the early 1900s

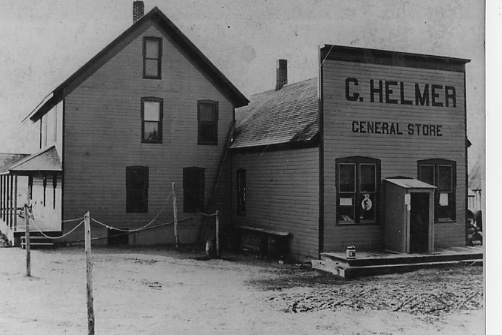
Historic photo of the general store

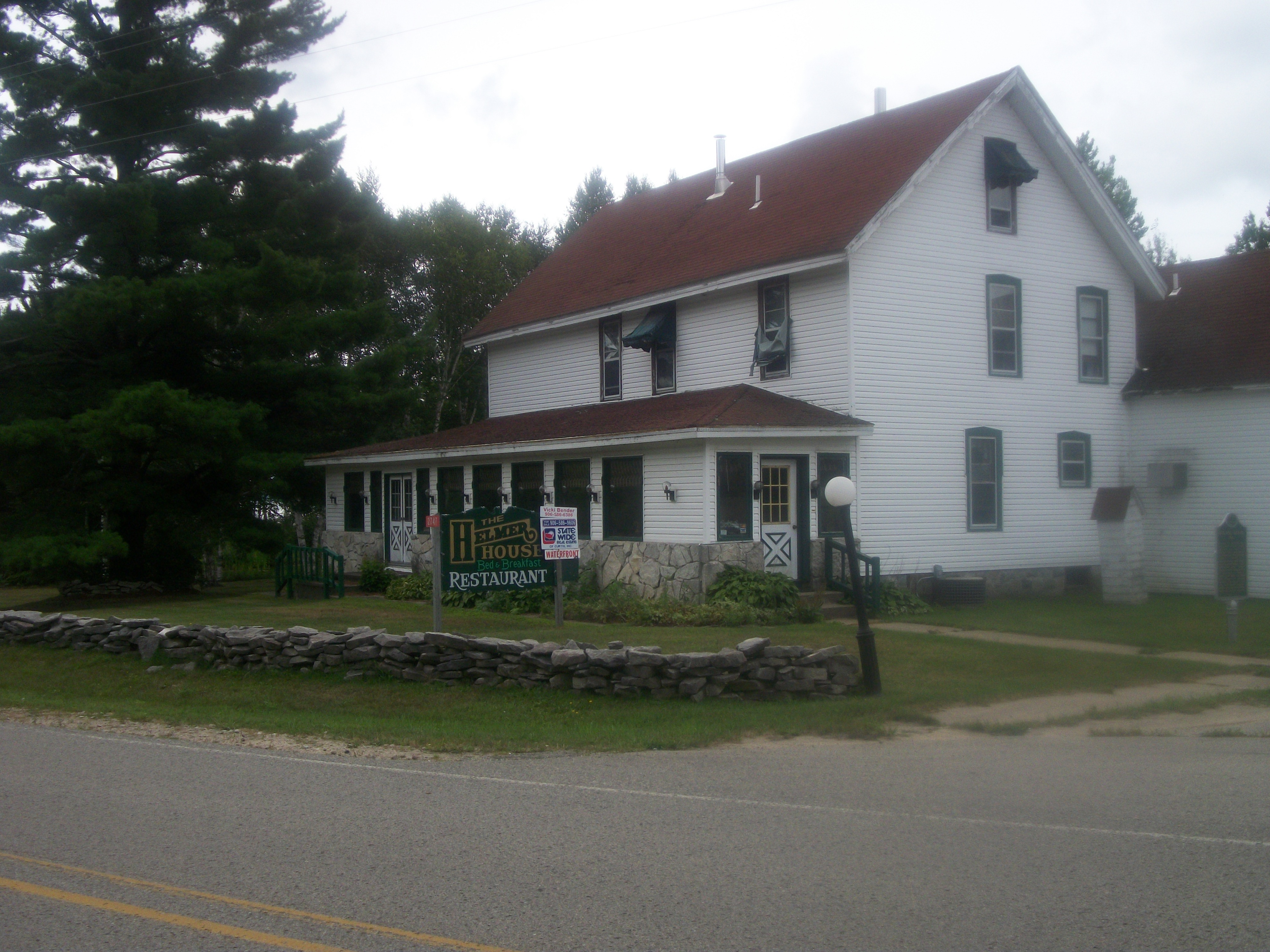
Closed and neglected structure in 2012

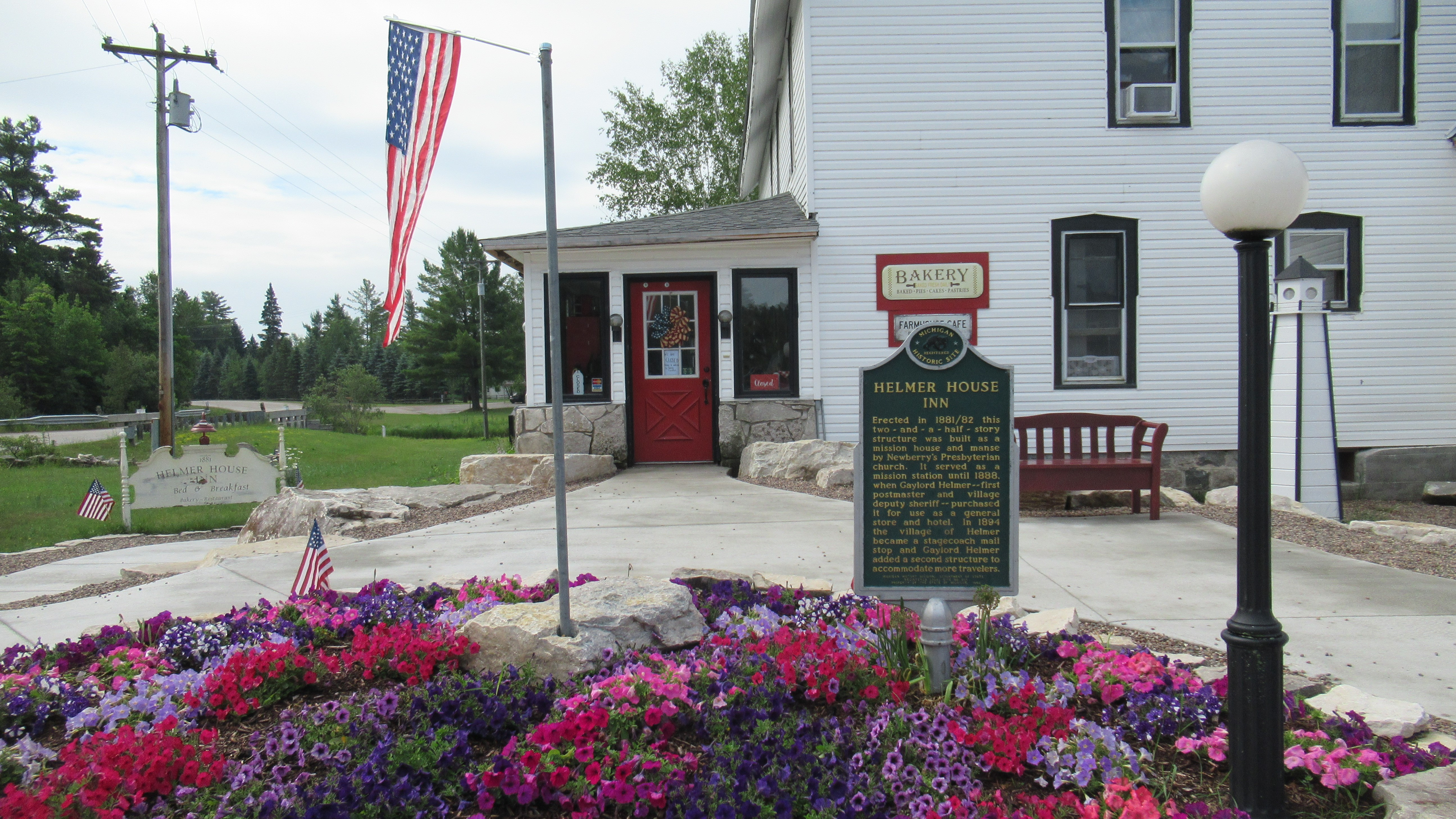
Helmer House Inn state historic marker
