= Lakefield Township, Michigan =

Lakefield Township is the name of some places in the U.S. state of Michigan:

- Lakefield Township, Luce County, Michigan
- Lakefield Township, Saginaw County, Michigan
