= Portage Township, Michigan =

Portage Township is the name of some places in the U.S. state of Michigan:

- Portage Township, Houghton County, Michigan
- Portage Township, Mackinac County, Michigan

== See also ==
- Portage, Michigan, a city in Kalamazoo County incorporated from the entirety of the former Portage Township.
