= 96.7 the Eagle =

96.7 the Eagle may refer to

- WKGL broadcasting to Rockford, Illinois
- WMJT broadcasting to northern Michigan
