= H-33 (Michigan county highway) =

County highway in Mackinac and Luce counties in Michigan, United States

H-33
- H-33 highlighted in red

Route information
- Maintained by Mackinac and Luce county road commissions
- Length: 18.222 mi (29.325 km)
- Existed: c. October 5, 1970–present

Major junctions
- South end: US 2 near Gould City
- H-44 in Helmer
- North end: M-28 near McMillan

Location
- Country: United States
- State: Michigan
- Counties: Mackinac, Luce

Highway system
- County-Designated Highways
← FFH 16	→ H-37
← M-134	M-135	→ M-136

H-33 is a county-designated highway in the Upper Peninsula of the US state of Michigan between Gould City and McMillan that was previously M-135, a former state trunkline highway. The roadway follows Manistique Lakes Road from Gould City at a junction with US Highway 2 (US 2) near Lake Michigan north to M-28 near McMillan. The northern section of the highway is also called County Road 135 (CR 135) in Luce County.

From 1929 until 1960, the road was part of the state highway system as M-135. The northern end of the highway always contained a section that ran concurrently with M-98, another state highway in the area. For a period in the 1950s, M-135 had a different northern terminus separate from M-98's endpoint. A few years before both highways were removed from the highway system, M-135 was moved to use M-98's terminus with M-28. Since the 1970s, M-135 has been a part of the county-designated highway system and assigned the number H-33, a moniker it has borne since.

== Route description ==
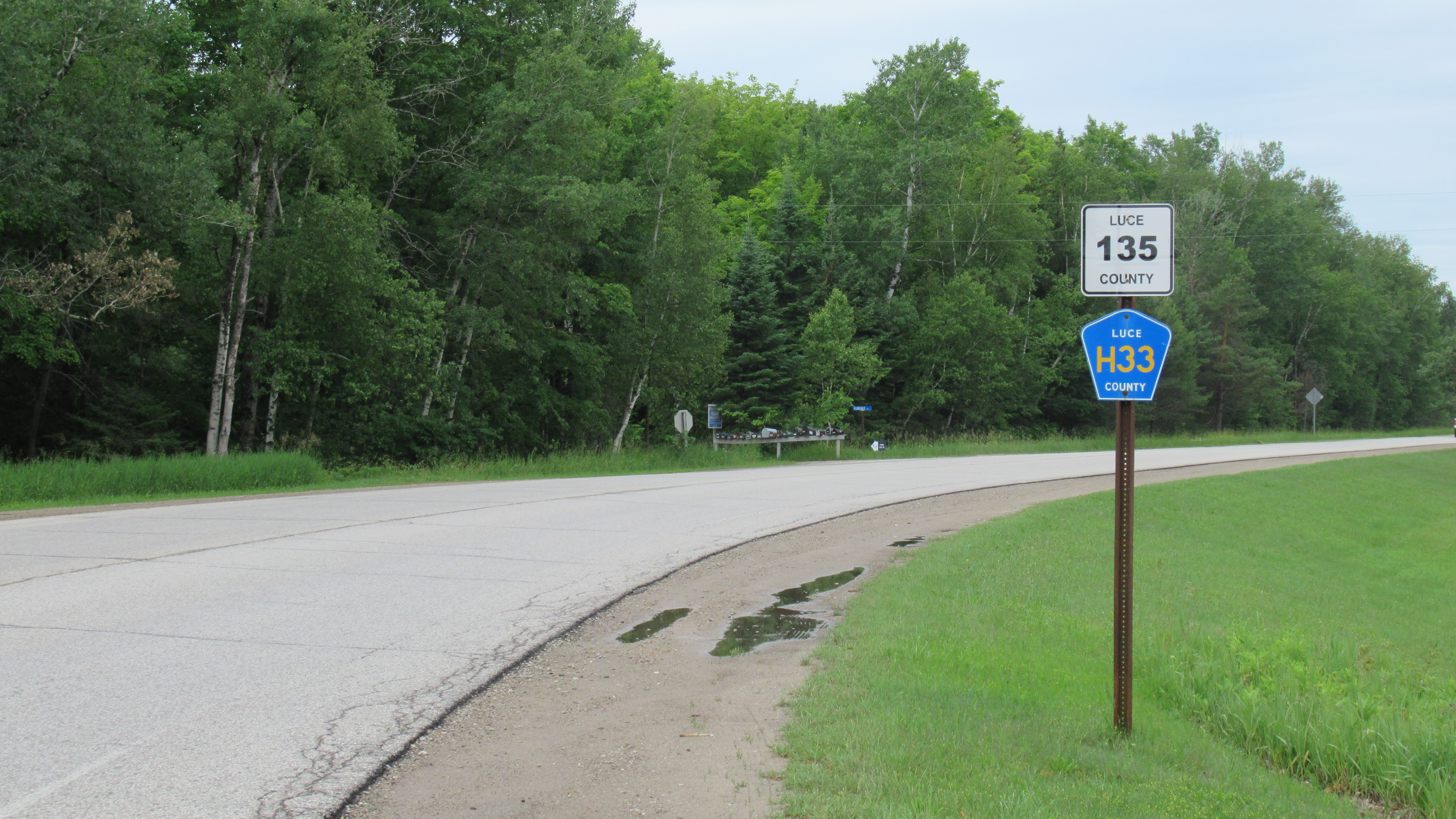
H-33 signage looking west near M-28 in Lakefield Township

H-33 begins at an intersection with US 2 just west of Gould City. From there the route travels due north through woodlands on Manistique Lakes Road, passing by Mitten and South Manistique lakes. The road crosses Norton and Strom creeks near South Manistique Lake before entering the community of Curtis. In that town, H-33 intersects the eastern end of H-42. North of Curtis, H-33 passes Manistique Lake as the road crosses the Mackinac–Luce county line. North of the line, H-33 has also been designated CR 135 by the Luce County Road Commission.

Continuing north, the roadway enters the community of Helmer where it meets a junction with the eastern terminus of the eastern H-44 (CR 98, Ten Curves Road) near North Manistique Lake. The roadway also crosses Locke Creek, which flows into that lake. After H-33 leaves Helmer, it continues northward to a junction with North Road Lake Road (CR 438) and Sampsell Road (CR 417). Manistique Lakes Road turns to the east, replacing North Round Lake Road, and H-33 follows suit. The road continues to a junction with M-28 just south of McMillan near East Lake. There H-33 terminates near farms and several small business.

== History ==
M-135
- Location: Newton Township–Lakefield Township
- Length: 18.222 mi (29.325 km)
- Existed: c. 1929–1960

In 1929, M-135 was designated, creating the concurrency along the last several miles of M-98. In late 1949 or early 1950, M-28 was realigned to take an angled route southeasterly out of McMillan. The east–west section of the previous M-28 routing was added to M-98 while the north–south segment was added to M-135. By the middle of 1958, M-135 was shifted to follow M-98, removing the roadway section added to its routing previously; this change made M-98 and M-135 concurrent north of Helmer all the way to M-28 once again. M-135 was removed from the state trunkline system in late 1960 or early 1961, and the designation was decommissioned at that time. The M-135 designation has not been reused since. The routing was then assigned as County Road H-33 after October 5, 1970, The road has retained that designation ever since.

== Major intersections ==
County	Location	mi	km	Destinations	Notes
Mackinac	Newton Township	0.000	0.000	US 2 / LMCT – St. Ignace, Escanaba	
Mackinac	Curtis	7.719	12.423	H-42 west	Eastern terminus of H-42
Luce	Helmer	13.432	21.617	H-44 west – Germfask	Junction with the former M-98; previously concurrent from here north with M-98: eastern terminus of the eastern H-44
Luce	Lakefield Township	18.222	29.325	M-28 / LSCT – Munising, Newberry	
1.000 mi = 1.609 km; 1.000 km = 0.621 mi
