= Curtis, Michigan =

- Unincorporated community
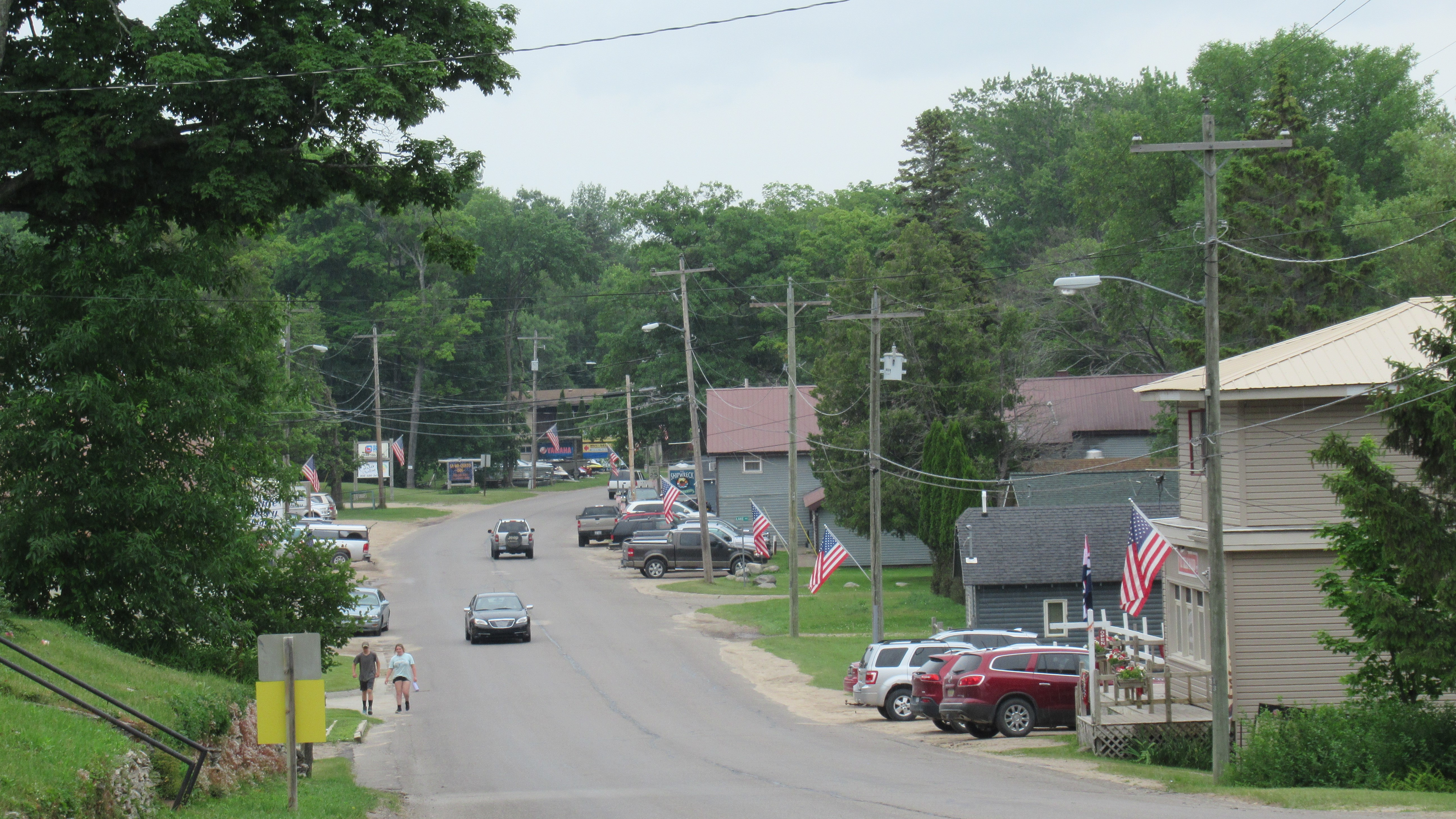
- Looking east along Main Street (H-42)

- Location within the state of Michigan Location within the United States
- Coordinates: 46°12′21″N 85°44′43″W
- Country: United States
- State: Michigan
- County: Mackinac
- Township: Portage
- Settled: 1884
- Established: 1905
- Platted: 1906
- Elevation: 699 ft (213 m)
- Time zone: UTC-5 (Eastern (EST))
  - Summer (DST): UTC-4 (EDT)
- ZIP code(s): 49820; 49836 (Germfask)
- Area code: 906
- GNIS feature ID: 624228
- Website: Chamber of Commerce

Curtis is an unincorporated community in Mackinac County in the U.S. state of Michigan. The community is located within Portage Township. As an unincorporated community, Curtis has no legally defined boundaries or population statistics of its own but does have its own post office with the 49820 ZIP Code.

== History ==
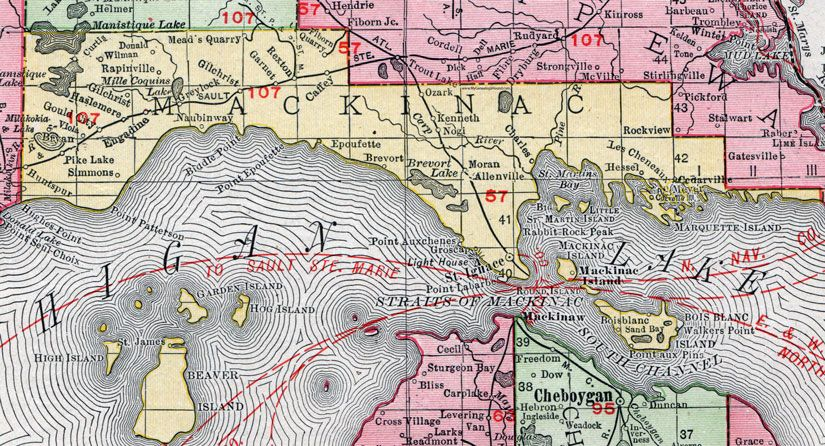
Curtis listed on a 1911 county map

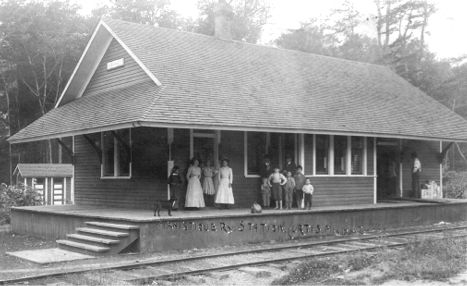
Former rail depot in Curtis in 1910

The area was originally inhabited by the Chippewa, and the first white settler to arrive in the area was John Lee. He arrived in the area in 1884 and lived among the Chippewa, sharing a hut with Chief Saw-Naw-Quato for 18 months. In 1886, the federal government granted land patents to John Lee and several Chippewa members. Lee settled on a plot of land on the shores of South Manistique Lake, and other family members and settlers began moving to the area.

The new community became known as Portage, and it was located along the narrowest stretch of land separating Manistique Lake and South Manistique Lake. The name was changed to Curtis when a post office was first established on November 15, 1905. The community was named after William L. Curtis, who was a politician who served as a state senator from 1902 to 1906. The community was officially platted in 1906 and was also known as Sawaquanto Beach. The post office has continuously remained in operation and is currently located at W17194 Main Street in the center of the community.

By 1907, Curtis had a population of around 75 residents. The community grew to include two saloons, a laundry facility, two general stores, and two hotels. That year, a railway line was constructed by the Manistique and Lake Superior Railroad. The community received a train depot, which connected it to many of the Upper Peninsula's lumber communities. Numerous cottages and resorts were constructed in hopes that Curtis would flourish when the area's lumber resources were exploited. However, the Manistique and Lake Superior Railroad abandoned the train depot soon after in 1910. The community's population dwindled to only 25 residents by 1913. The remaining residents instead turned their focus toward farming and fishing. The depot closed but was occasionally used by lumber companies through the 1920s until the lumber resources in the area were depleted. After that, the depot was demolished, and the railway lines were removed. The community was able to sustain and steadily grow due to its proximity to numerous lakes that provided good hunting and fishing opportunities.

Without the railway, Curtis depended on roadways for traveling. M-135 was a state highway first commissioned in 1928. It ran just east of the community and connected to M-28 to the north and US Highway 2 to the south. The state highway was decommissioned in 1960. In 1970, the road was given its current designation of H-33. Also in 1970, the main roadway through Curtis was designated as H-42, which provides direct access to M-77 to the west and H-33 to the east.

The Woodlawn Cemetery, also known as the Curtis Cemetery, is located along Curtis Road just east of the center of the community. Established in 1930, it is an active cemetery with its oldest grave site dating back to 1910.

== Attractions ==
The Erickson Center for the Arts, formerly known as the Curtis Community Arts Council, is a Michigan nonprofit organization dedicated to providing educational, performing arts, cultural and physical activity opportunities in Curtis and the larger central Upper Peninsula. It includes an outdoor covered stage and the indoor Pine Performance center, along with a park, large landscaped grounds, walking trails, and the Helen Newberry Joy Hospital Wellness Center.

== Geography ==
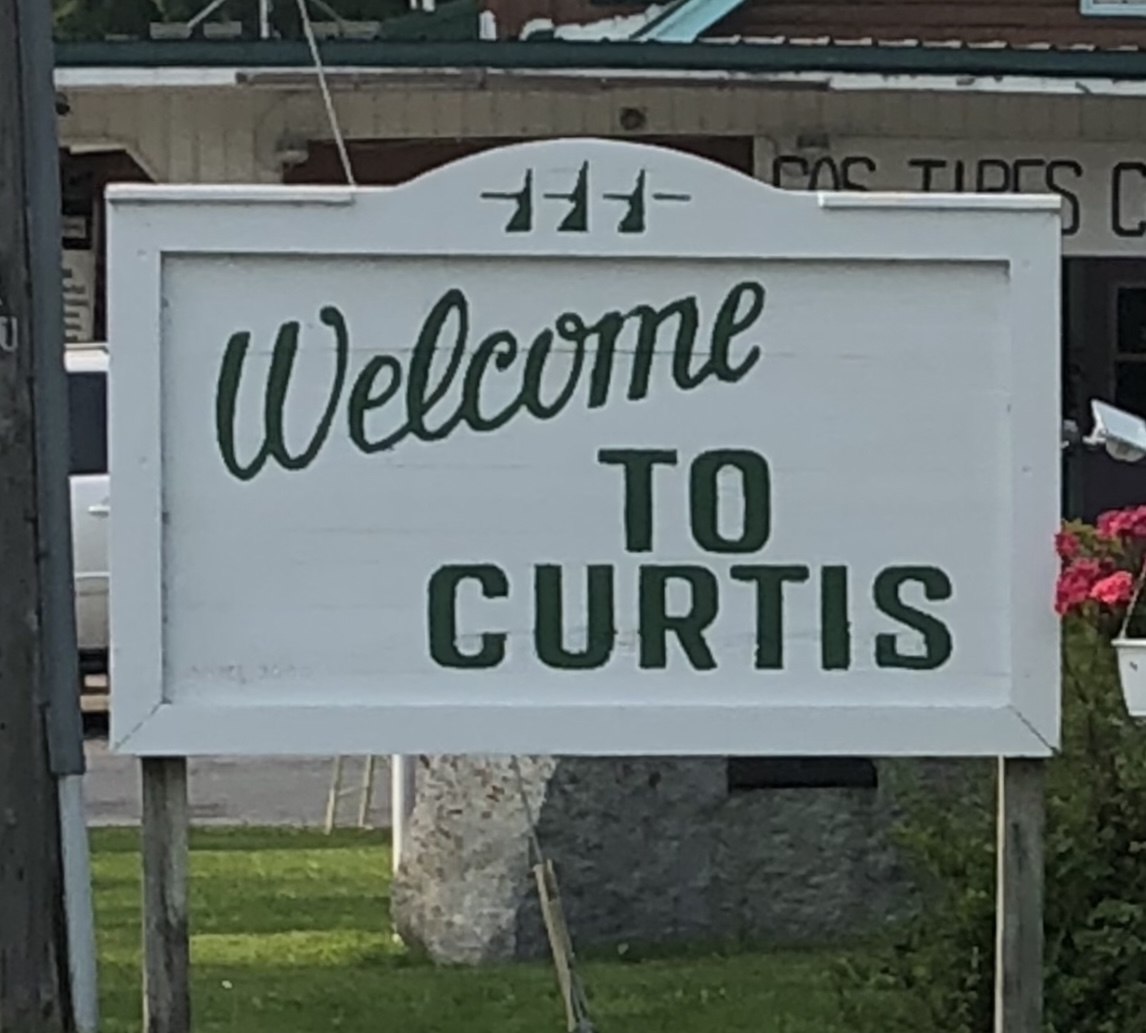
Welcome to Curtis sign

The community of Curtis is located within central Portage Township in the state's Upper Peninsula about 65 miles (105 km) west of the Mackinac Bridge. Curtis sits at an elevation of 699 feet (213 m) above sea level.

The community is a popular tourist destination and is surrounded by numerous lakes, including the three Manistique Lakes (Manistique Lake, North Manistique Lake, and South Manistique Lake), as well as Milakokia Lake, Millecoquins Lake, and the smaller Lake Ann Louise. Other nearby bodies of water include Shoepac Lake and Black Creek Flooding. Black Creek is a tributary of Portage Creek, which connects Manistique Lake to the north with South Manistique Lake. Portage Creek flows through the center of the community, which is situated along a narrow stretch of land between the two larger lakes.

Curtis is centered along H-42 (Main Street), which runs west to connect to M-77. H-42 has its eastern terminus at H-33 (Manistique Lakes Road) just east of the center of the community, and H-33 runs north to M-28 and south to U.S. Highway 2 (US 2). Other nearby communities include Helmer and McMillan to the north, Germfask to the northwest, Blaney Park to the southwest, Gould City to the south, and Engadine to the southeast.

The community has its own post office that uses the 49820 ZIP Code. The post office serves a small area that includes the central portion of Portage Township, as well as a smaller portion of Lakefield Township in Luce County to the north. Areas just to the west of the community may use the Germfask 49836 ZIP Code. The community is within the southern boundaries of Tahquamenon Area Schools in Newberry, which has the largest area of any public school district in the state.

The Portage Township Offices are located in Curtis at W17361 Davis Street. Because of the community's close proximity to several lakes, the Michigan Department of Natural Resources maintains numerous public boat launches in the Curtis area. The two closest to the center of the community are located along the southern shores of Manistique Lake with one along Long Road and another to the northeast in Portage Township Park.

== Images ==
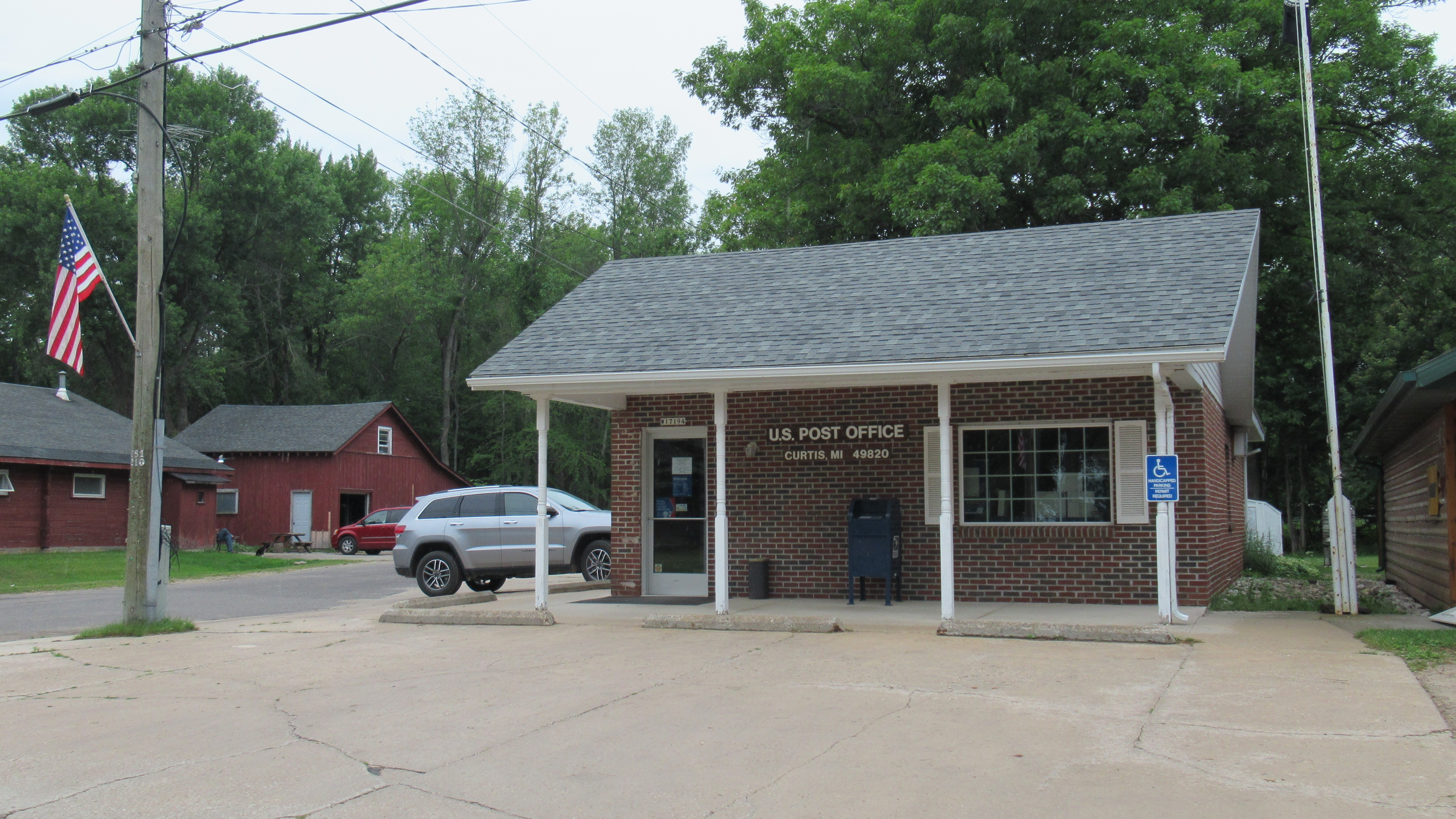
U.S. Post Office in Curtis

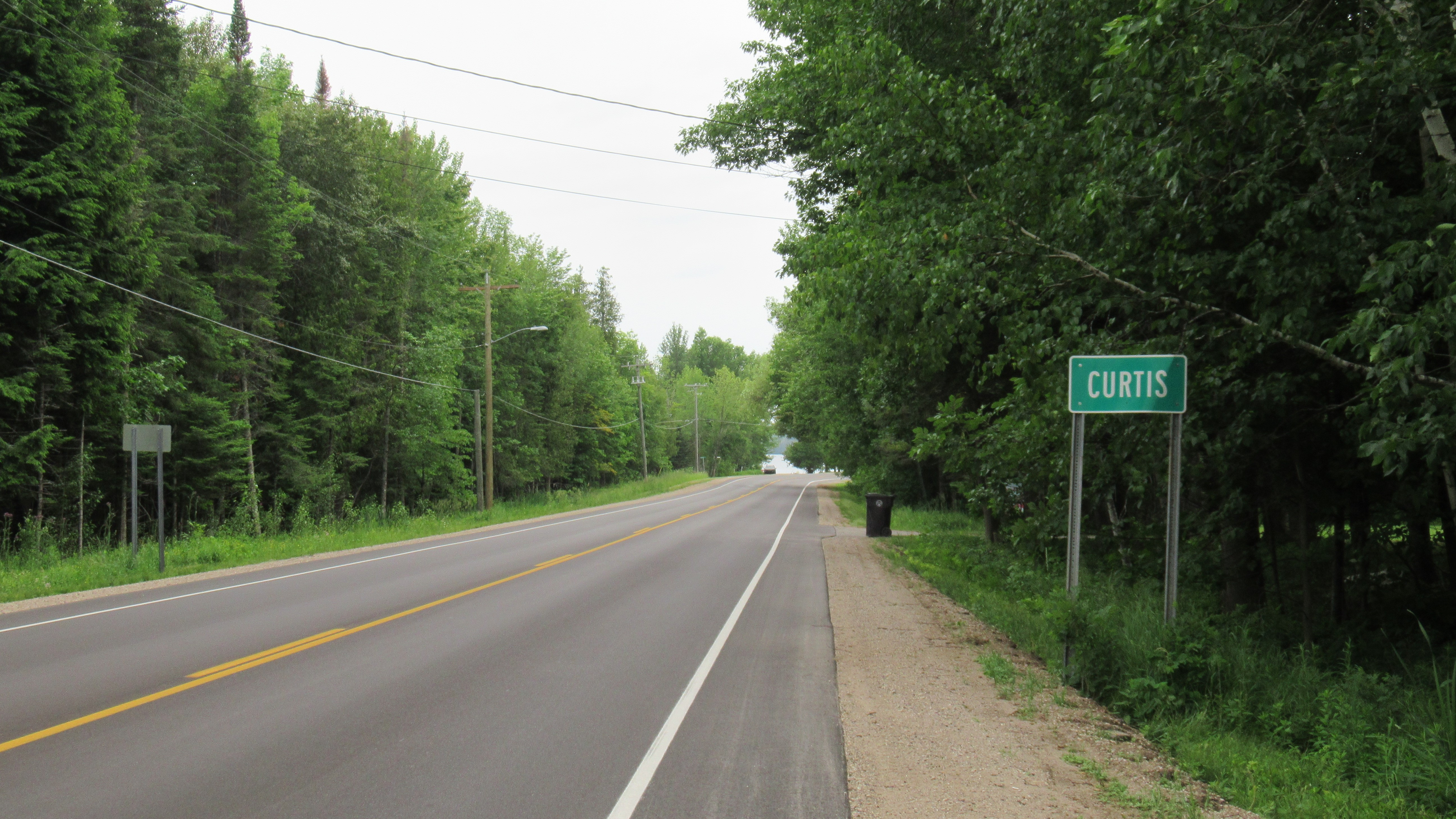
Road signage along Main Street

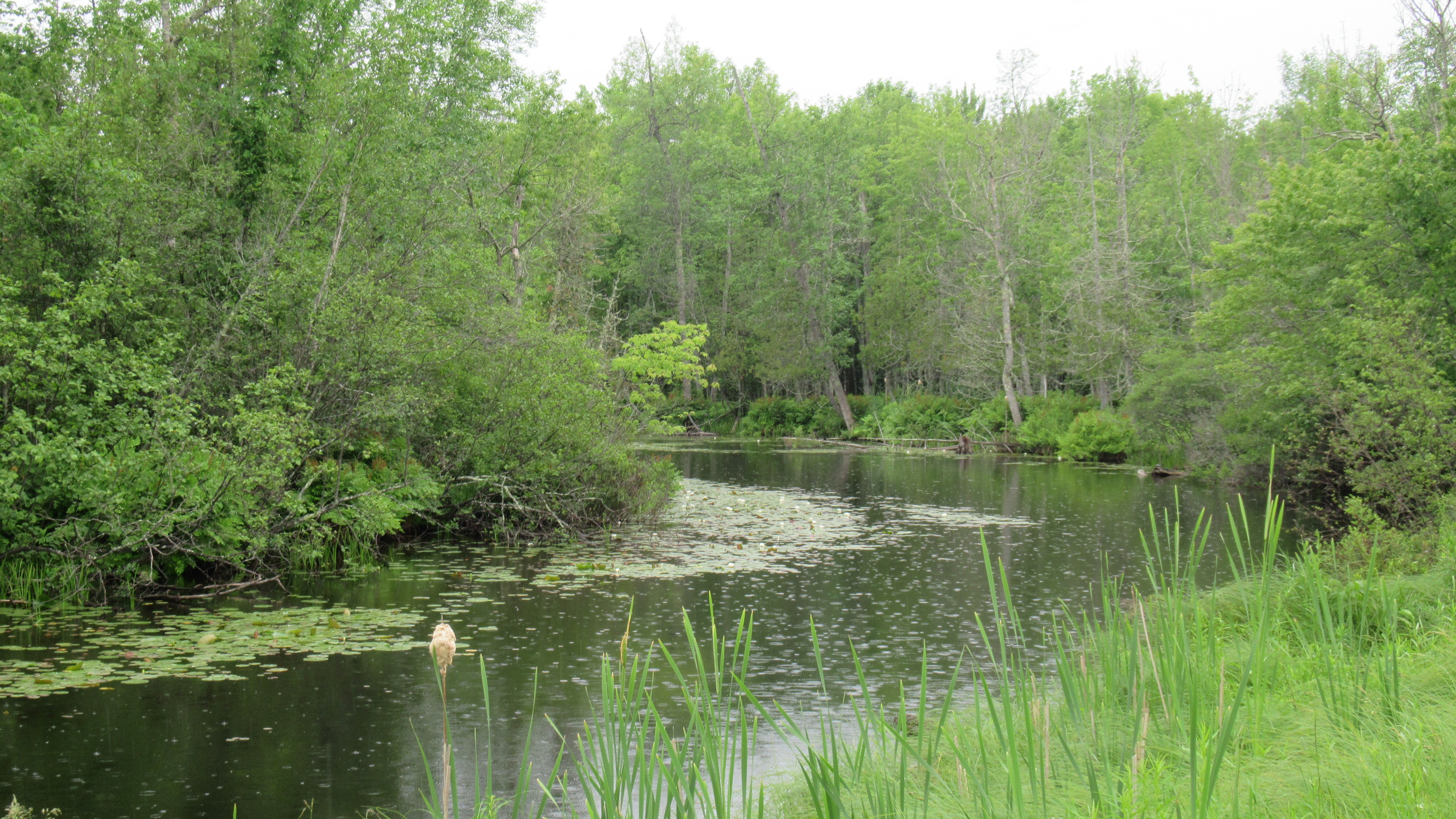
Portage Creek along H-33

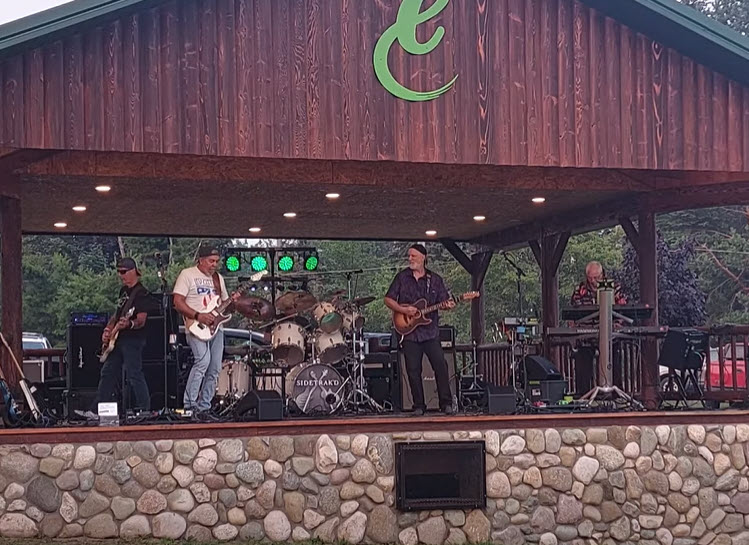
A band performing at the Erickson Center in Curtis
