= Lakefield Township, Luce County, Michigan =

Lakefield Township, Michigan
- Civil township
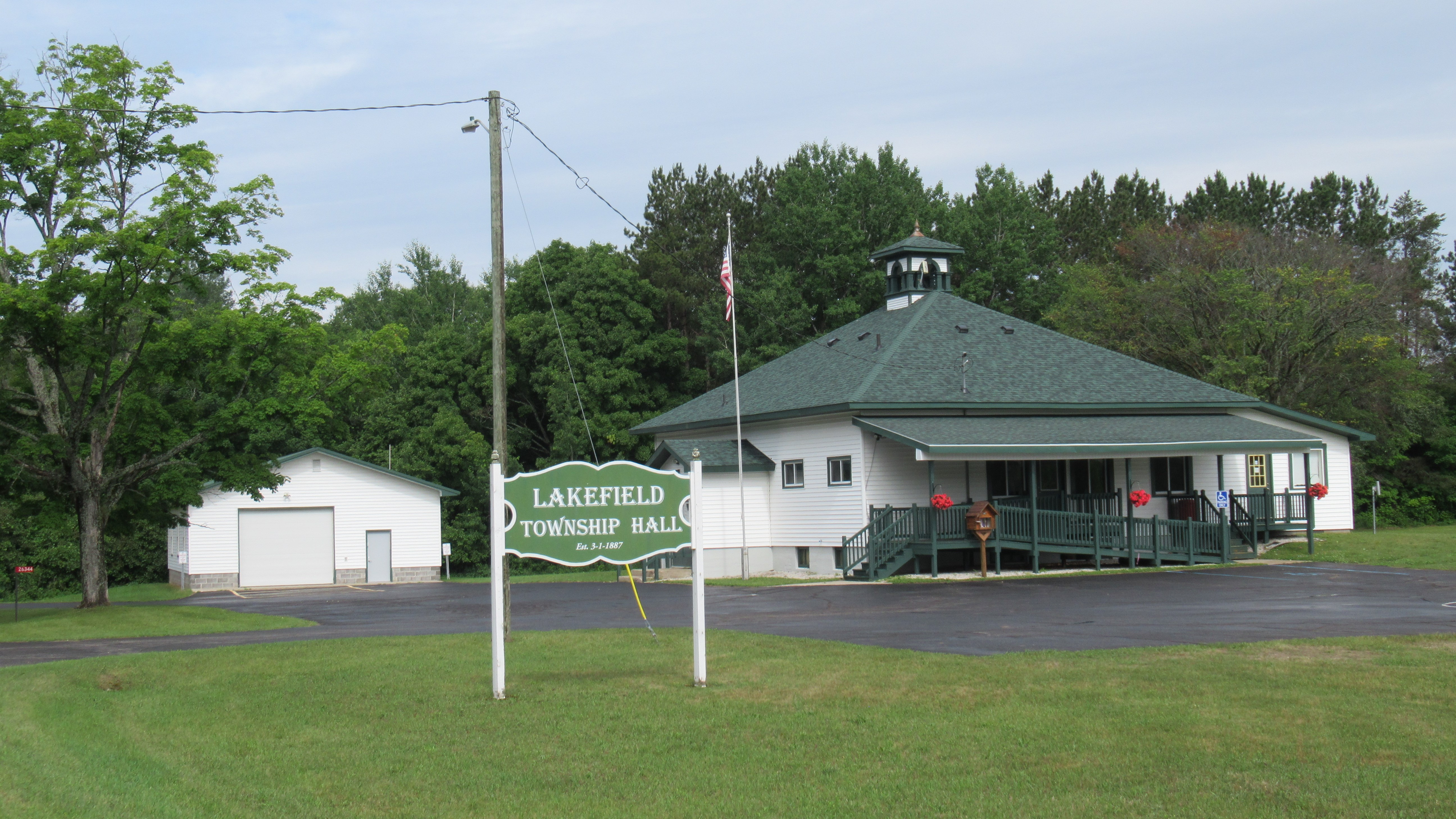
- Lakefield Township Hall

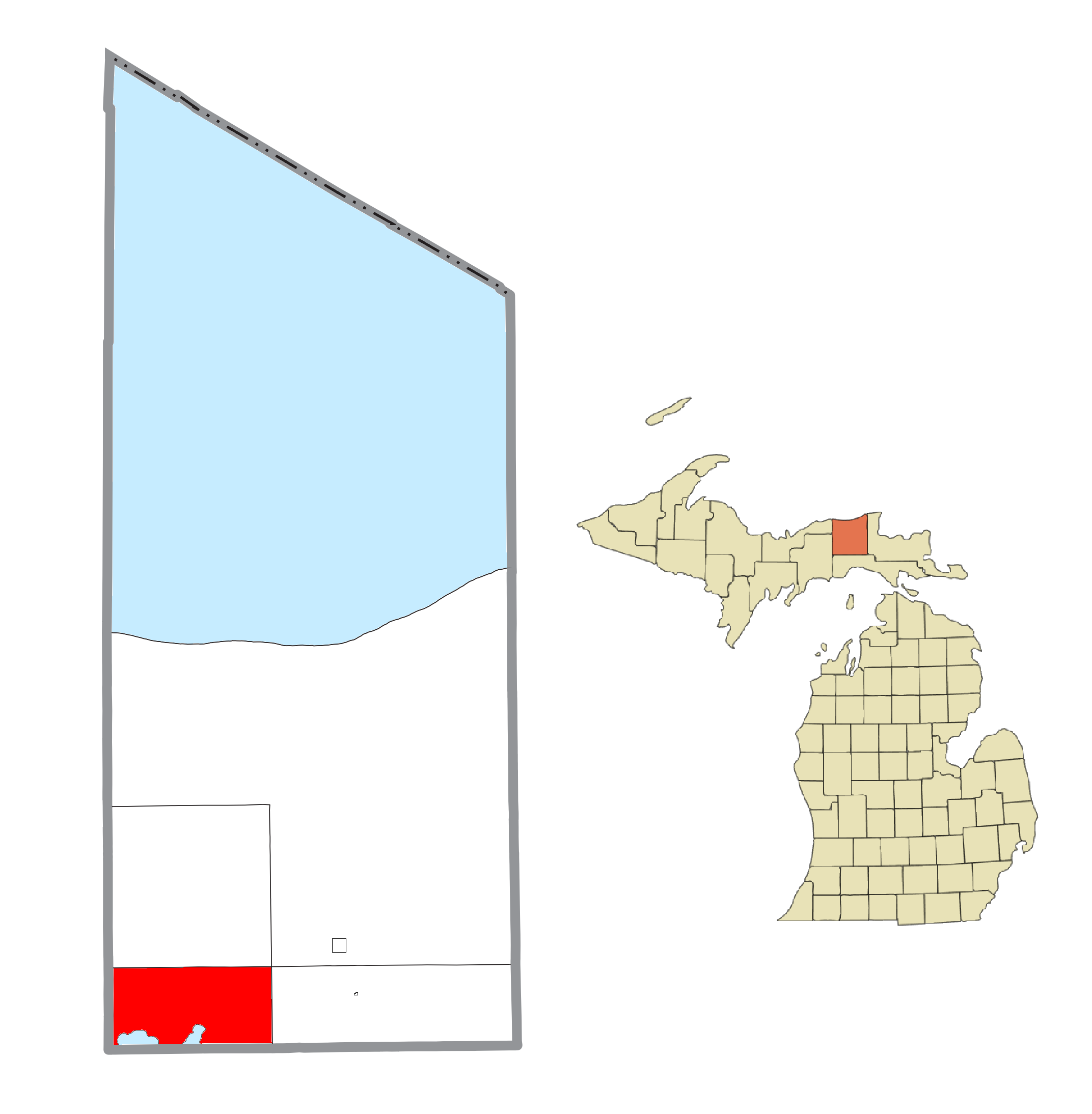
- Location within Luce County

- Location within the state of Michigan Location within the United States
- Coordinates: 46°16′38″N 85°42′55″W
- Country: United States
- State: Michigan
- County: Luce
- Established: 1877

Government
  - Supervisor: Thomas Dennis
  - Clerk: Timothy Teed

Area
  - Total: 71.95 sq mi (186.3 km^{2})
  - Land: 63.18 sq mi (163.6 km^{2})
  - Water: 8.77 sq mi (22.7 km^{2})
- Elevation: 712 ft (217 m)

Population (2020)
  - Total: 1,135
  - Density: 16.8/sq mi (6.5/km^{2})
- Time zone: UTC-5 (Eastern (EST))
  - Summer (DST): UTC-4 (EDT)
- ZIP code(s): 49820 (Curtis); 49853 (McMillan)
- Area code: 906
- FIPS code: 26-44540
- GNIS feature ID: 1626582
- Website: https://lakefieldtwp-luce.com/

Lakefield Township is a civil township of Luce County in the U.S. state of Michigan. The population was 1,135 at the 2020 census, an increase from 1,061 at the 2010 census.

== Geography ==
According to the United States Census Bureau, the township has a total area of 71.95 square miles (186.35 km^{2}), of which 63.18 square miles (163.64 km^{2}) is land and 8.77 square miles (22.71 km^{2}) (12.19%) is water.

Lakefield Township includes several large lakes, including the northern coast of Manistique Lake, as well as North Manistique Lake. The two lakes are connected by the small Helmer Creek. The township also includes the smaller Crooked Lake, East Lake, Locke Lake, Lost Lake, McCormick Lake, and T Lake.

=== Major highways ===
- M-28 runs through a small portion of the northeast corner of the township.
- H-33, known locally as County Road 135, begins at M-28 and runs south through the center of the township.
- H-44, known locally as 10 Curves Road (County Road 98), begins at H-33 and runs east–west toward M-77.

=== Communities ===
- Helmer is an unincorporated community on at the northeast shore of Manistique Lake and the location of the historic Helmer House Inn.
- Carpenter Landing is an unincorporated community at 46°17′23″N 85°45′28″W on the western shore of North Manistique Lake and southwest of Newberry.

== Demographics ==
At the census of 2000, there were 1,074 people, 449 households, and 347 families residing in the township. The population density was 16.9 per square mile (6.5/km^{2}). There were 897 housing units at an average density of 14.2 per square mile (5.5/km^{2}). The racial makeup of the township was 94.13% White, 0.09% African American, 2.98% Native American, 0.47% Asian, 0.09% Pacific Islander, 0.09% from other races, and 2.14% from two or more races. Hispanic or Latinos of any race were 0.19% of the population. By the 2020 census, its population was 1,135 with a predominantly non-Hispanic white population.

In 2000, there were 449 households, out of which 22.9% had children under the age of 18 living with them, 71.0% were married couples living together, 4.5% had a female householder with no husband present, and 22.7% were non-families. 19.4% of all households were made up of individuals, and 7.1% had someone living alone who was 65 years of age or older. The average household size was 2.37 and the average family size was 2.68. In the township the population was spread out, with 19.4% under the age of 18, 4.6% from 18 to 24, 20.8% from 25 to 44, 35.6% from 45 to 64, and 19.7% who were 65 years of age or older. The median age was 48 years. For every 100 females, there were 104.6 males. For every 100 females age 18 and over, there were 102.8 males.

In 2000, the median income for a household in the township was $34,773, and the median income for a family was $38,472. Males had a median income of $32,596 versus $20,536 for females. The per capita income for the township was $16,671. About 6.4% of families and 11.2% of the population were below the poverty line, including 21.1% of those under age 18 and 2.4% of those age 65 or over. According to 2021 estimates, its median household income was $57,024.
