= Manistique River =

River in Michigan

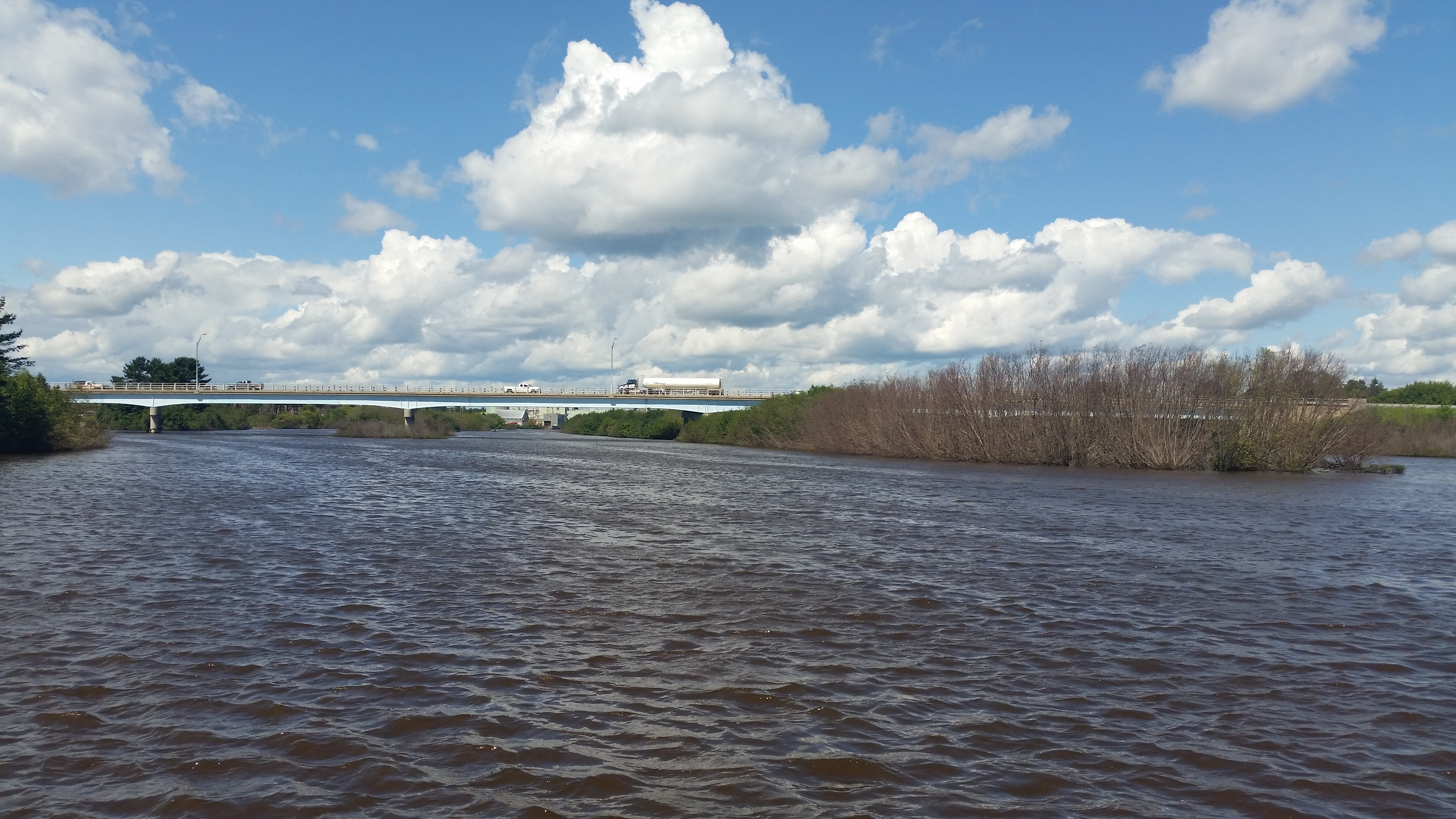
- U.S. Route 2 crossing the river in Manistique

- Location within the state of Michigan

Location
- Country: United States
- State: Michigan
- Region: Upper Peninsula

Physical characteristics
- Source
  - location: Alger County, Michigan
  - coordinates: 46.247°N 85.852°W
- Mouth
  - location: Lake Michigan
  - coordinates: 45.948°N 86.246°W
- Length: 71 miles (114 km)
- Basin size: 1,461 sq mi (3,780 km^{2})

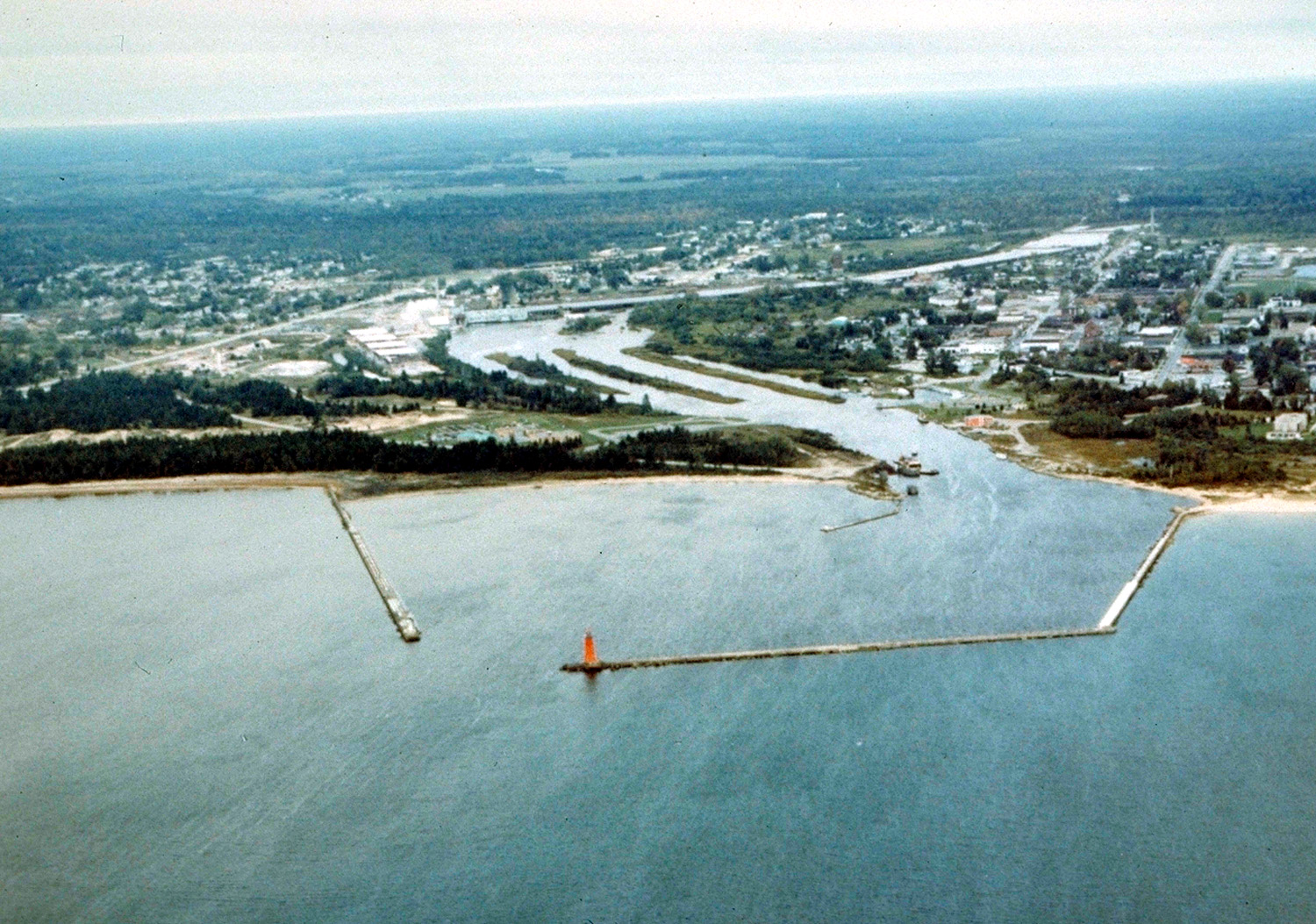
Aerial view of the river mouth and harbor at Lake Michigan

The Manistique River (/ˌmænɪsˈtik/ man-iss-TEEK) is a 71.2-mile-long (114.6 km) river in the U.S. state of Michigan that winds southward through the central Upper Peninsula from its headwaters near Lake Superior to its mouth in Lake Michigan. It drains approximately 1,461 square miles (3,780 km^{2}) of the Upper Peninsula, including most of Schoolcraft County and small portions of Alger County, Delta County, Luce County, and Mackinac County. The river rises at the outlet of Manistique Lake in the southwest corner of Luce County, and after flowing through the Seney National Wildlife Refuge, empties into Lake Michigan at Manistique, Michigan. M-77, a north–south highway, serves much of the Manistique River's drainage and crosses the river and its tributaries several times.

== Boreal forest wetlands ==
The drainage of the Manistique River is very flat and sandy. The river is not characterized by rapids or waterfalls. Instead, it wriggles along an alluvial bed of sand and silt eroded and redeposited by the river itself. The Manistique River's drainage was one of the last zones in Michigan to be clear cut, with old-growth timber being felled as late as the 1910s. The watershed was then abandoned or reverted to state and federal ownership. As of 2007, 93% of the drainage was forested, largely with second-growth trees such as aspen and birch. More than one-half, 58%, of the drainage was owned by the federal government or the state of Michigan. Governmental ownership units included the Seney National Wildlife Refuge, Hiawatha National Forest, and Lake Superior State Forest.

== Lakes ==
Major lakes drained by the Manistique River include Indian Lake north of Manistique, Manistique Lake in the central Upper Peninsula, and two tributary lakes, North Manistique Lake and South Manistique Lake. The lakes have several motorboat ramps.

== Recreation ==
Because the Manistique River is relatively slow and flat through much of its length, it is a favorite for novice-to-intermediate-level canoeists and kayakers. Fishing for bass, pike, and walleye is popular. A small population of trout challenges anglers.

== Environmental conditions ==
=== Great Lakes Area of Concern ===
Due to environmental contamination, a portion of the river was designated a Great Lakes Area of Concern (AOC) under the Great Lakes Water Quality Agreement of 1987. The designated site includes the lowermost 1.7-mile (2.7 km) portion of the Manistique River downstream of a dam in the city of Manistique, as well as the Manistique harbor at the mouth of the river on Lake Michigan. Sediments at the site contained high levels of polychlorinated biphenyls (PCBs) and heavy metals resulting from historical pollution by sawmills, a paper mill, and small industries along the river. A 1996 remedial action plan for the AOC identified five "beneficial use impairments" caused by the pollution:

- restrictions on fish and wildlife consumption due to PCBs and heavy metals in sediments
- degradation of benthos, which was first documented in the 1950s and has been attributed to wood fibers and waste deposited by sawmill and paper mill operations, combined sewer overflows, and chemical wastes
- restrictions on dredging activities due to high levels of PCBs and heavy metals including lead, zinc, cadmium, chromium, and copper in sediments
- beach closings or potential restrictions on body contact due to the potential for high bacterial levels caused by combined sewer overflows
- loss of fish and wildlife habitat, including impacts on the site's coldwater fishery

Three of these impairments have been removed from the designation (degradation of benthos in 2006, loss of fish and wildlife habitat in 2008, and beach closings in 2009) following remediation projects, which have included placement of temporary caps over contaminated areas and dredging of contaminated sediment, beginning in the 1990s.

=== Sea lamprey ===
A 1996 report identified the Manistique River as having the largest run of invasive sea lamprey in Lake Michigan, and a 2007 survey identified the river as the second-largest source of sea lamprey larvae in the Lake Michigan watershed. Lampreys historically were prevented from swimming upstream of the lowermost portion of the river by a dam in the city of Manistique, built in 1919. Deterioration of the dam has made it less effective as a barrier to sea lamprey, and the U.S. Fish and Wildlife Service and other agencies have developed plans to install a sea lamprey barrier at the site.
