= South Manistique Lake =

Lake in the state of Michigan, United States

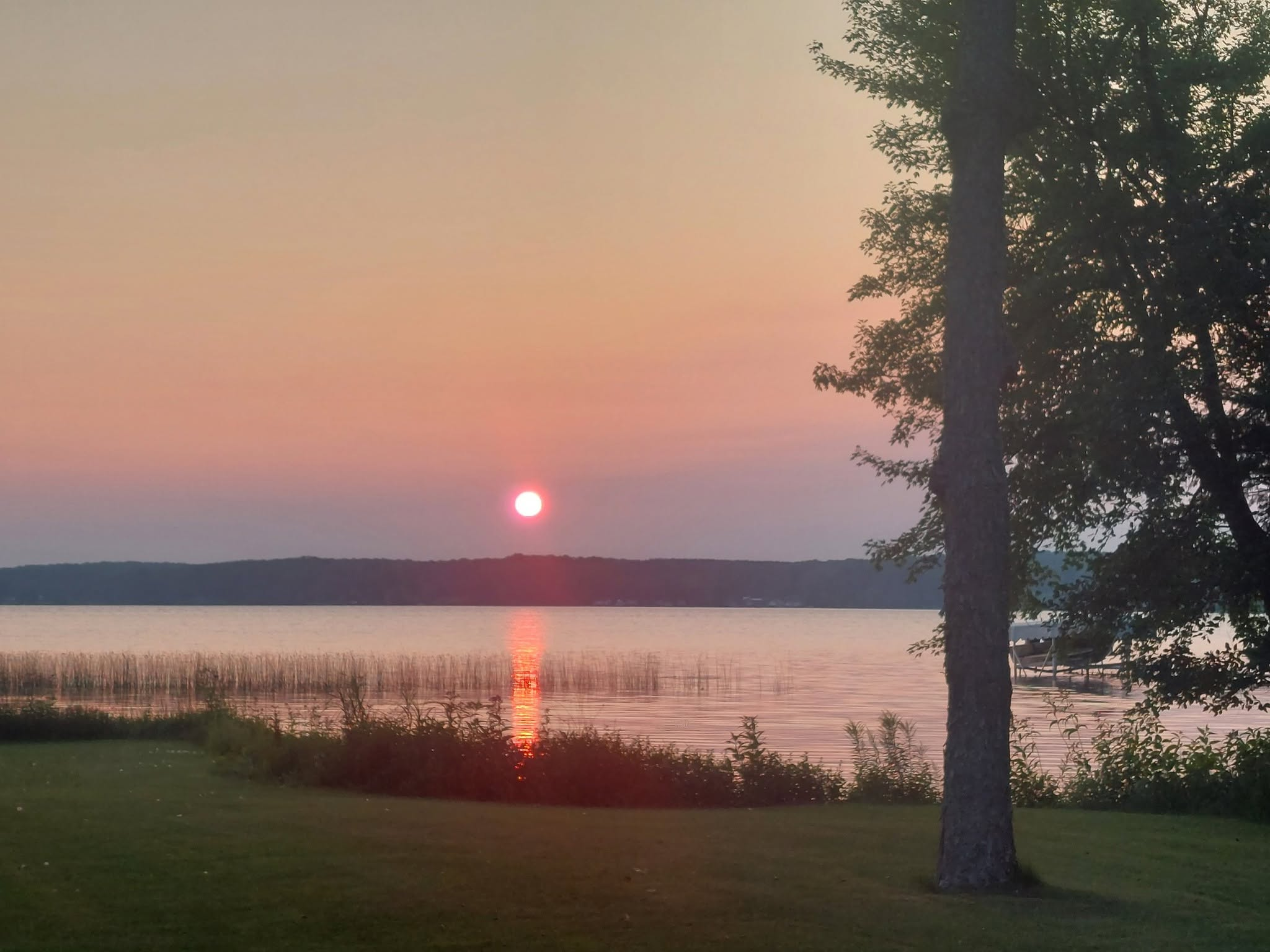
- South Manistique Lake at sunrise

- Location within Michigan Location within the United States
- Location: Mackinac County, Michigan
- Coordinates: 46°10′31″N 85°46′04″W
- Type: Lake
- Primary inflows: Shoepac River
- Primary outflows: Portage Creek
- Basin countries: United States
- Max. length: 4.5 mi (7.2 km)
- Max. width: 2 mi (3.2 km)
- Surface area: 4,001 acres (1,619 ha)
- Average depth: 10 ft (3.0 m)
- Max. depth: 29 ft (8.8 m)
- Surface elevation: 692 ft (211 m)
- Islands: Norton Island
- Settlements: Curtis

South Manistique Lake is a 4,001-acre (1,619 ha) lake in Mackinac County, in the Upper Peninsula of the U.S. state of Michigan. Approximately 4.5 miles (7.2 km) long and 2 miles (3.2 km) wide, it is oriented in a southwest–northeast direction. Elevated 692 feet (211 m) above sea level and 6 feet (1.8 m) above Big Manistique Lake, South Manistique Lake drains northeastward through Portage Creek into the larger lake.

Homeowners and visitors are served by the unincorporated community of Curtis, Michigan, located on an isthmus that divides South Manistique Lake from Big Manistique Lake directly to the north.

A 1.5-mile-long (2.4 km) spit of glacial gravel, left behind by some long-forgotten Ice Age glacier, projects from South Manistique Lake's western shore out into the lake. Not surprisingly, it is called "Long Point." An islet, Norton Island, can be seen near the lake's southeastern shore.

As with other Upper Peninsula lakes, South Manistique Lake is known for its fishing. Local guides point fisherfolk toward muskie, smallmouth bass, and the lake's self-sustaining population of walleye. The lake's average depth is 10 feet (3.0 m), and its maximum depth is 29 feet (8.8 m).

== See also ==
- List of lakes in Michigan
