= WMJT =

Coordinates: 46.534°N 85.590°W

- McMillan, Michigan; United States
- Broadcast area: Newberry, Michigan
- Frequency: 96.7 MHz
- Branding: 96.7 Flash FM

Programming
- Format: Rock

Ownership
- Owner: Travis Sumbera; (Sumbera Broadcasting, LLC)

History
- First air date: June 2006

Technical information
- Licensing authority: FCC
- Facility ID: 164160
- Class: C2
- ERP: 50,000 watts
- HAAT: 126 meters (413 ft)

Links
- Public license information: Public file; LMS

WMJT (96.7 FM, "96.7 Flash FM") is an American radio station licensed to serve the community of McMillan, Michigan. The station serves the Newberry, Michigan area. WMJT broadcasts a Rock format.

== History ==
On October 31, 2018, WMJT changed their format from classic hits to hot adult contemporary, branded as "96.7 Flash FM".

== Sources ==
- Michiguide.com - WMJT History
