= McMillan, Michigan =

- Unincorporated community
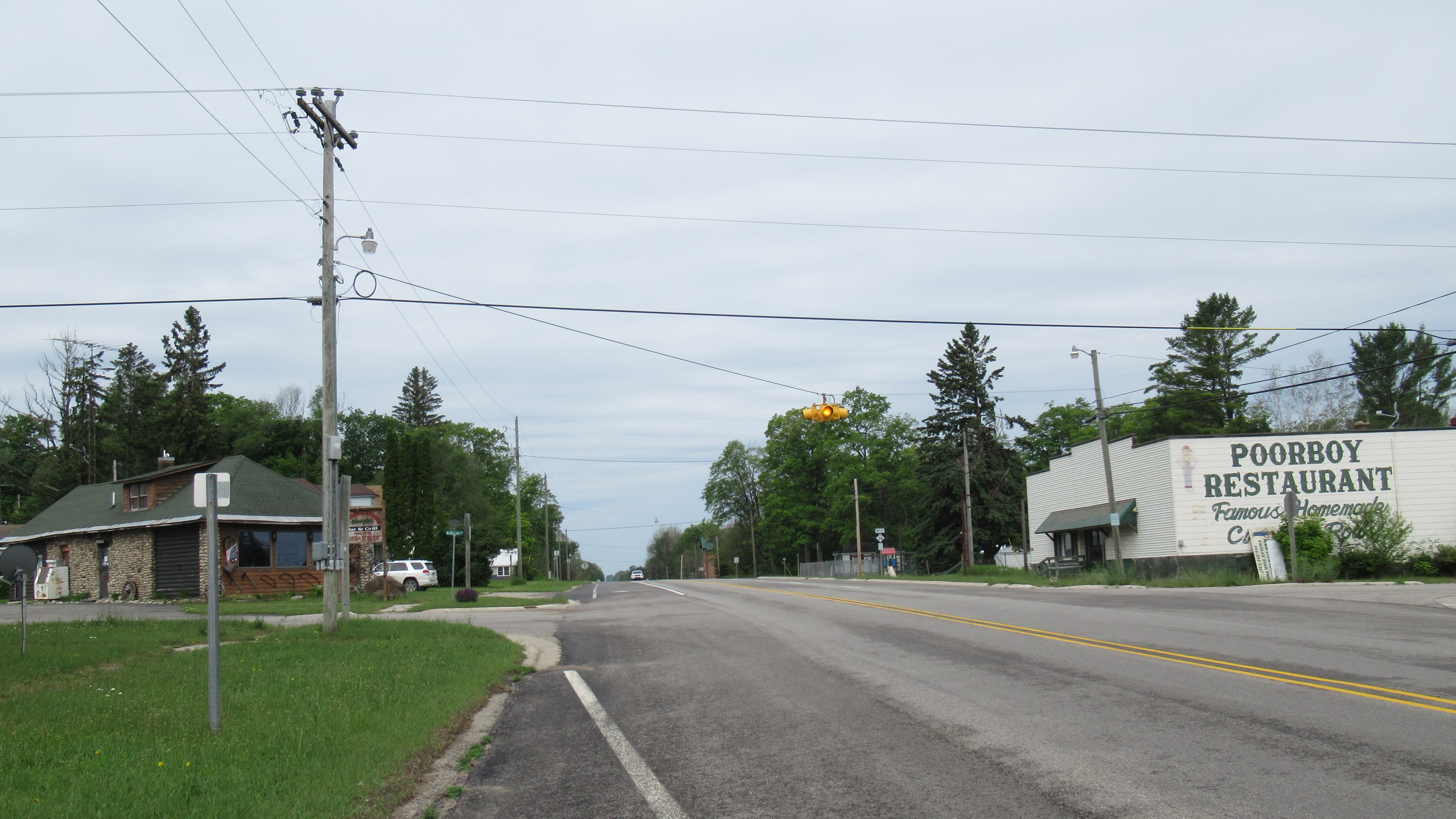
- Looking west along M-28

- Location within the state of Michigan Location within the United States
- Coordinates: 46°20′20″N 85°41′14″W
- Country: United States
- State: Michigan
- County: Luce
- Township: Columbus
- Settled: 1881
- Established: 1882
- Elevation: 781 ft (238 m)
- Time zone: UTC-5 (Eastern (EST))
  - Summer (DST): UTC-4 (EDT)
- ZIP code(s): 49853
- Area code: 906
- GNIS feature ID: 631994

McMillan is an unincorporated community in Luce County in the U.S. state of Michigan. The community is located along M-28 within Columbus Township. As an unincorporated community, McMillan has no legally defined boundaries or population statistics of its own but does have its own post office with the 49853 ZIP Code.

== History ==
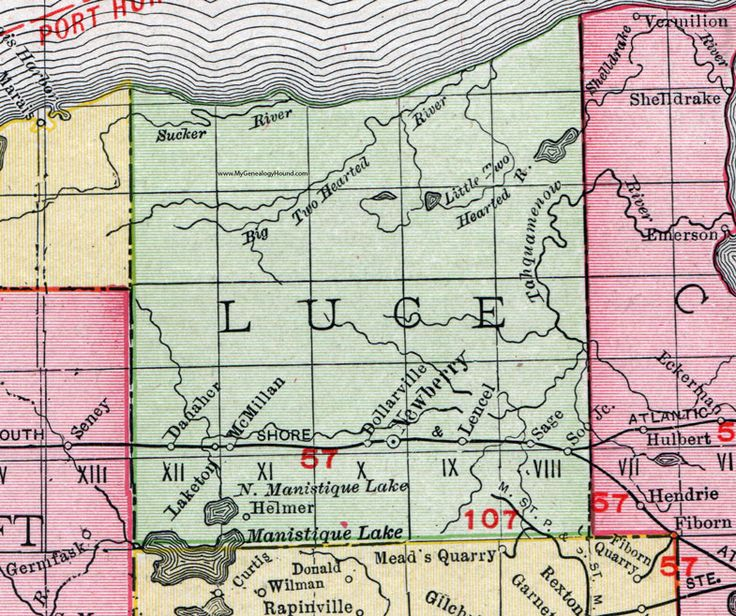
McMillan listed on a 1911 county map

The community of McMillan was first settled in 1881 when the Duluth, South Shore and Atlantic Railway built a line through the area. A rail depot named the McMillan Station opened to serve the area. The station and the new community were named after railway executive and future Michigan senator James McMillan. At the time, the area was part of western Chippewa County until Luce County was created in 1887.

McMillan received a post office on April 21, 1882. The post office has continuously remained in operation and is currently located at 22579 M-28 in the center of the community.

McMillan recorded a population of 40 in 1887. The community benefited from the increased lumber industry, and the railway connected it to many other communities within the Upper Peninsula. In 1910, the community reached a peak population of around 300 and consisted of several general stores, hotels, saloons, sawmill, livery, and the Northern Cooperage & Lumber Company. When the lumber industry declined, the community's population reduced to about 200 by 1927, and many businesses left. In 1919, M-25 was designated as a state highway that ran through McMillan. In 1928, the highway was redesignated as M-28. The railway line remains active and is operated by Canadian National Railway but no longer contains a stop or railway station within McMillan.

The Columbus Township Cemetery, also known as the McMillan Cemetery, is located in the community along County Road 415 just south of M-28.

=== Lincoln School ===
Around 1910, the McMillan School was built to serve its residents. The building was constructed in an unusual way, in which there are no windows on the front of the building. These were referred to as "blind walls" that were meant to control lighting in the corner classrooms. The building did not receive electricity until 1925. In 1916, the school merged with the larger Standard School system in order to better serve the rural population. The same year, the building also received a significant addition as the student population grew. Until 1922, the school served students up to the eleventh grade, as twelfth grade students had to complete their education in Newberry. In 1923, the school saw its first graduating class of four students. In 1932, the building was rebranded as the Lincoln School, although budget restraints still caused some students to go to Newberry. The school closed by 1973 and students were consolidated into Tahquamenon Area Schools in Newberry. The building was purchased and turned into a bottling company that filtered water from the nearby Tahquamenon River, although the original structure now remains vacant.

== Geography ==
The community of McMillan is located within southeast Columbus Township in the state's Upper Peninsula about 10 miles (16.1 km) west of the village of Newberry. McMillan sits at an elevation of 781 feet (238 m) above sea level. Some areas surrounding the community are included in the Sault Ste. Marie section of the Lake Superior State Forest.

McMillan is centered along M-28 and County Road 415 (known locally as McMillan Avenue). In addition to Newberry, other nearby communities include Dollarville to the east, Curtis and Helmer to the south, Seney to the west, and the smaller McMillan Corner directly to the south along H-33.

Along with Newberry, McMillan has one of only two current post offices in Luce County. The McMillan post office uses the 49853 ZIP Code. The post office serves a much larger area that includes most of Columbus Township and Lakefield Township, as well as a very small northern portion of Portage Township in Mackinac County to the south and the eastern fringes of Germfask Township in Schoolcraft County to the west. The community is served by Tahquamenon Area Schools in Newberry, which has the largest area of any public school district in the state.

The upper portion of the Tahquamenon River flows just north of the center of the community. The Columbus Township Hall is located in McMillan at 7459 County Road 415.

== Media ==
- WMJT 96.7 FM is an adult contemporary radio station that is licensed to McMillan and serves the Newberry area.

== Gallery ==
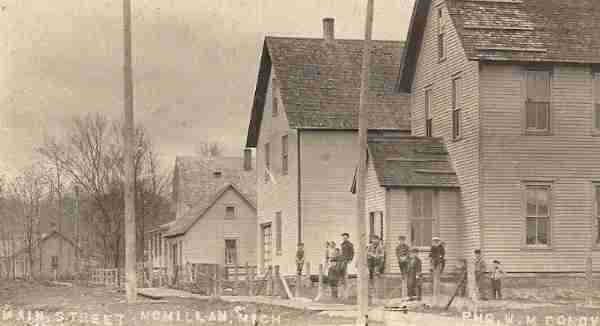
Main Street in 1910

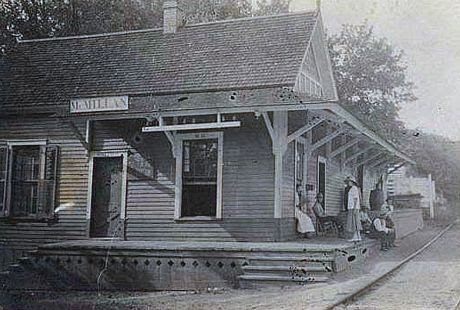
The former McMillan Station in 1918

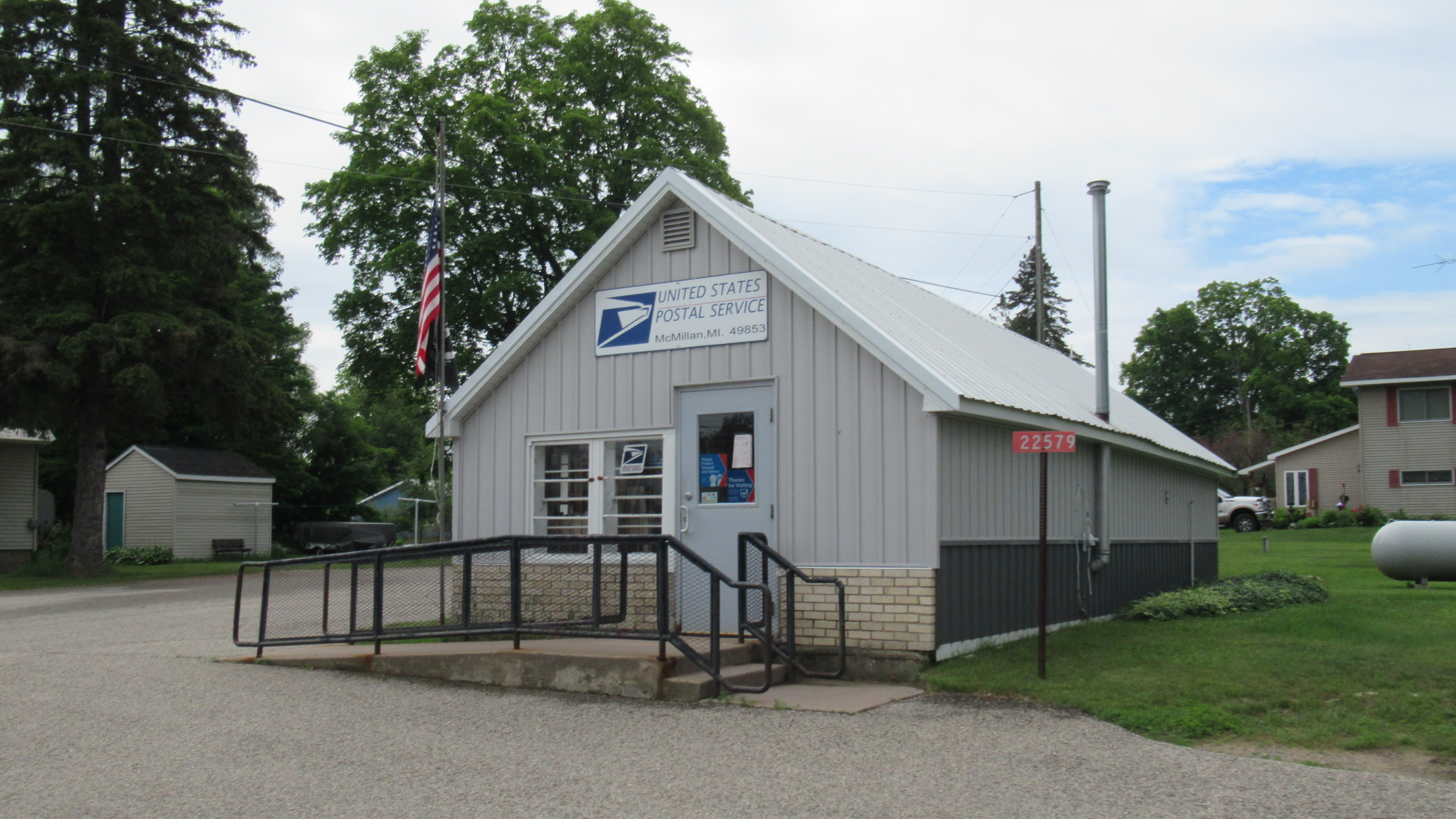
U.S. Post Office in McMillan

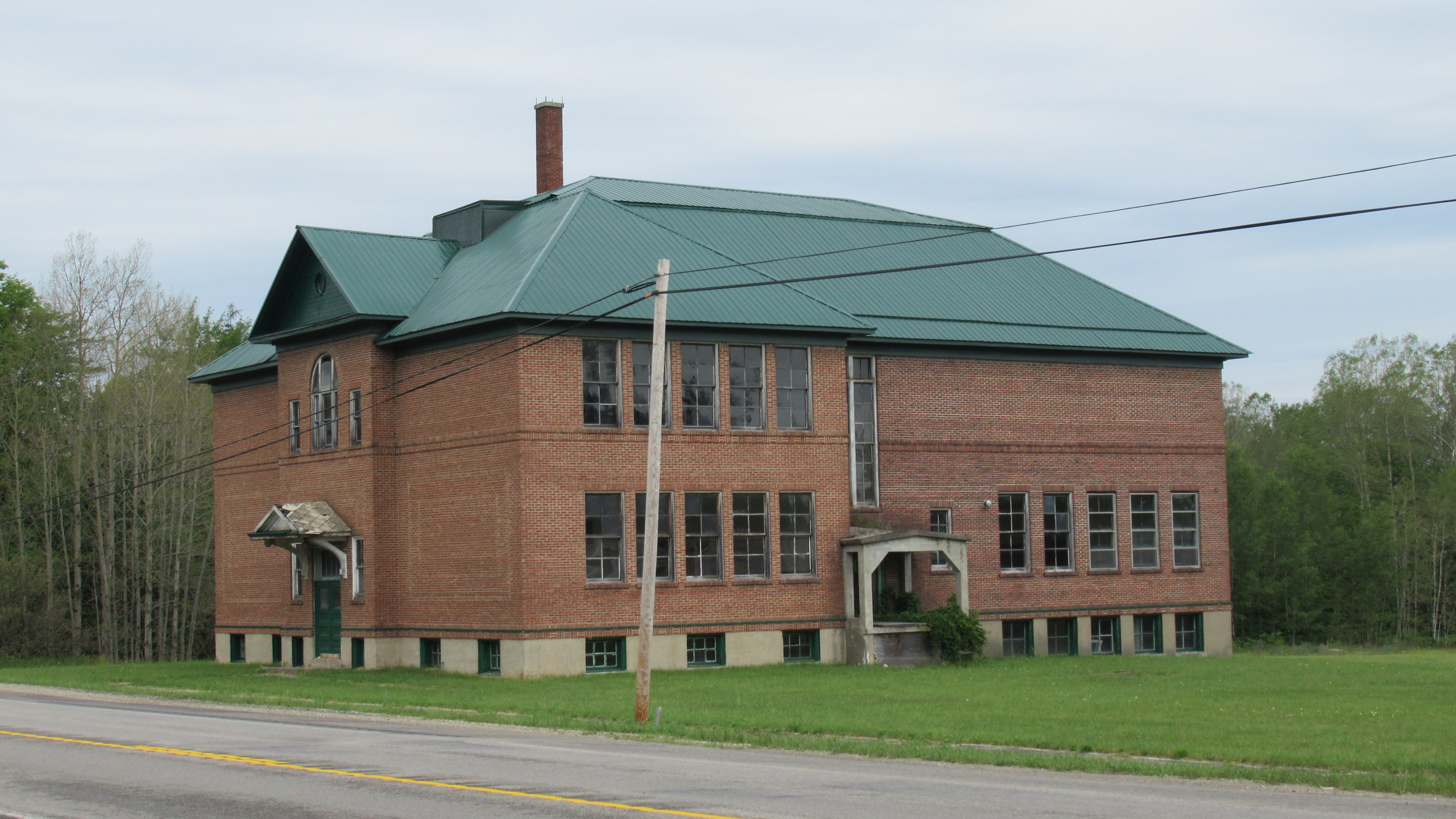
The defunct Lincoln School in 2021
