= Manistique Lake =

Lake in the state of Michigan, United States

- Monistique Lake, Manistee Lake
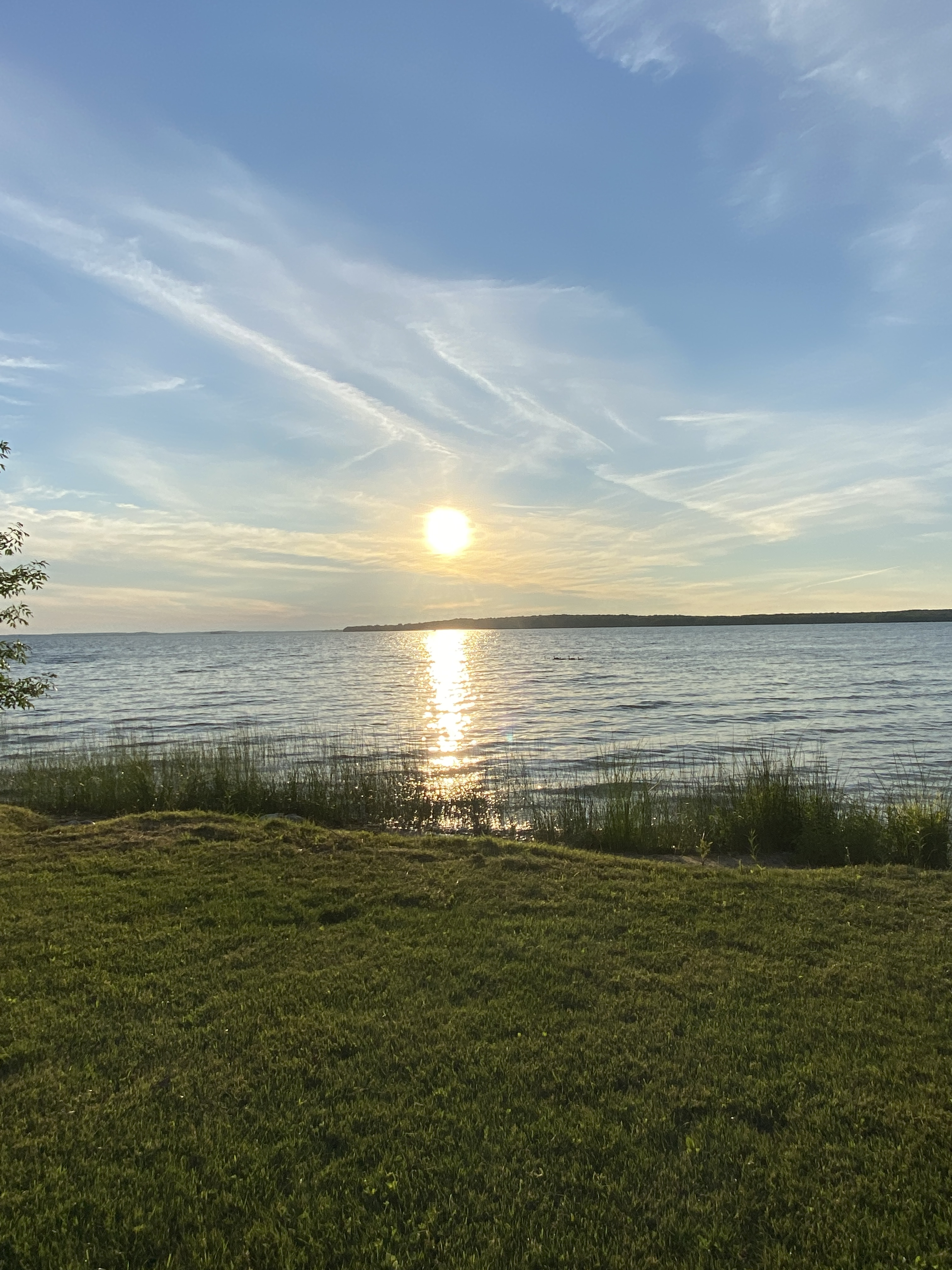
- Manistique Lake at sunset

- Location within Michigan Location within the United States
- Location: Luce County, Mackinac County, Michigan
- Coordinates: 46°14′05″N 85°47′02″W
- Type: Lake
- Primary inflows: Portage Creek, Helmer Creek
- Primary outflows: Manistique River
- Basin countries: United States
- Max. length: 6.5 mi (10.5 km)
- Max. width: 4 mi (6.4 km)
- Surface area: 10,130 acres (4,100 ha)
- Average depth: 10 ft (3.0 m)
- Max. depth: 20 ft (6.1 m)
- Surface elevation: 689 ft (210 m)
- Islands: Burnt Island, Foster Island, Greenfield Island, Gull island

Manistique Lake (/mænɪsˈtik/ man-iss-TEEK), locally called Big Manistique Lake to distinguish it from the other lakes in the Manistique Lakes system, is a 10,130-acre (4,100 ha) lake in the Upper Peninsula of the U.S. state of Michigan. Approximately 6.5 miles (10.5 km) long and 4 miles (6.4 km) wide, it is one of the largest lakes in the Upper Peninsula. Elevated 686 feet (209 m) above sea level and 105 feet (32 m) above Lake Michigan, Manistique Lake drains into the larger lake through a marshy outlet on the west end of the lake that forms one source of the Manistique River. Relatively shallow, the lake's deepest point is only 20 feet (6.1 m) below the water surface. The average depth is 10 feet (3.0 m).

The lake is shared between Luce County and Mackinac County. The small town of Curtis, Michigan is located on an isthmus that divides Manistique Lake from South Manistique Lake directly to the south.

Manistique Lake has at least three islands large enough to show up on maps - Burnt Island near the eastern shore, Foster Island near the northern shore, and Greenfield Island near the center of the lake.

Many seasonal residents use Manistique Lake as a focus of summer recreational activity. The relatively shallow lake is favored for swimming, powerboating, personal watercraft, fishing, ice fishing, and camping. The Michigan Department of Natural Resources (MDNR) recommends the lake for fishing and boating. Fish caught in the lake include bluegill, largemouth bass, muskie, perch, northern pike, rock bass, smallmouth bass, sunfish, and walleye.

== See also ==
- List of lakes in Michigan
