= Germfask Township, Michigan =

- Civil township
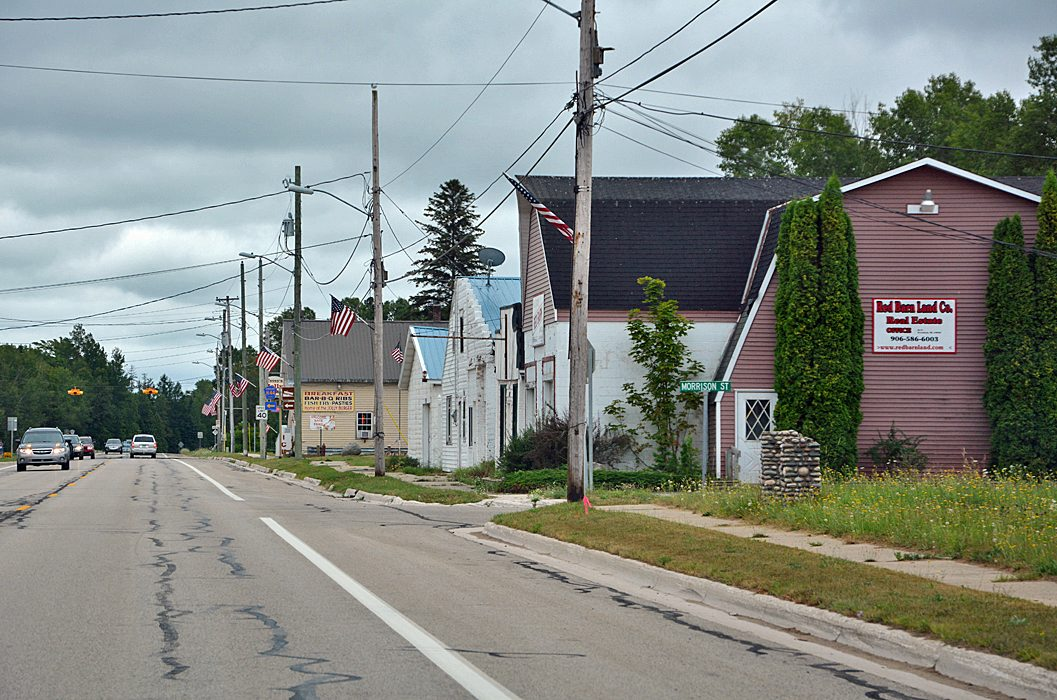
- Community of Germfask along M-77

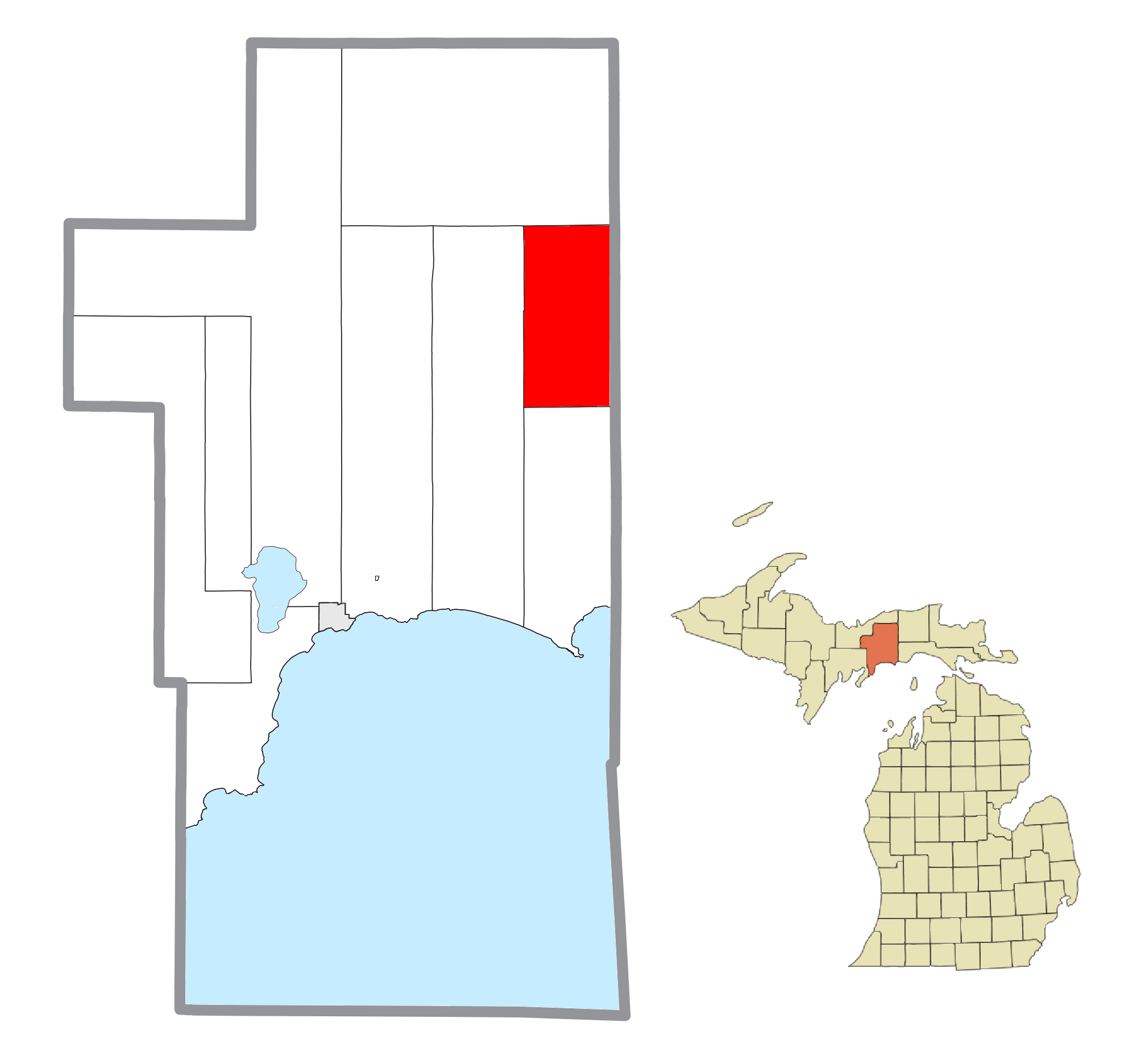
- Location within Schoolcraft County

- Location within the state of Michigan Germfask Township (the United States)
- Coordinates: 46°14′49″N 85°56′22″W
- Country: United States
- State: Michigan
- County: Schoolcraft

Government
  - Supervisor: Abby Burton
  - Clerk: Lynn Krupla

Area
  - Total: 71.63 sq mi (185.5 km^{2})
  - Land: 66.43 sq mi (172.1 km^{2})
  - Water: 5.20 sq mi (13.5 km^{2})
- Elevation: 690 ft (210 m)

Population (2020)
  - Total: 469
  - Density: 7.06/sq mi (2.73/km^{2})
- Time zone: UTC-5 (Eastern (EST))
  - Summer (DST): UTC-4 (EDT)
- ZIP code(s): 49836 (Germfask); 49853 (McMillan)
- Area code: 906
- FIPS code: 26-31940
- GNIS feature ID: 1626347

Germfask Township (/ˈdʒərmfæsk/ JERM-fask) is a civil township of Schoolcraft County in the U.S. state of Michigan. The population was 469 in 2020.

The name was derived from the surname initials of eight of the original settlers of 1881: John Grant, Matthew Edge, William Robinson, Thaddeus Mead, Dr. W. W. French, Ezekiel Ackley, Oscar (O.D.) Sheppard, and Hezekiah Knaggs. The community was a station on the Manistique Railway and was given a post office on February 26, 1890.

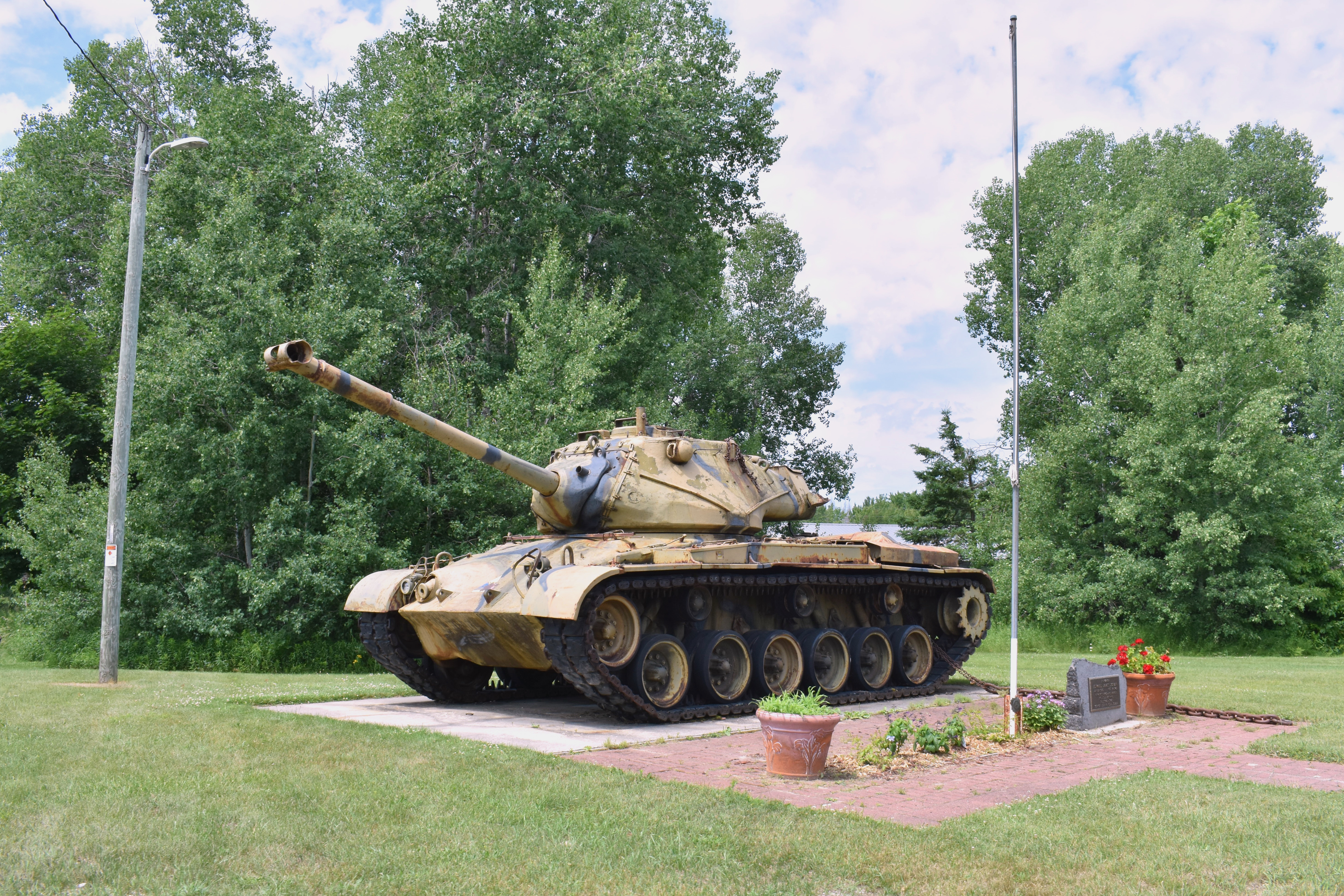
The M47 Patton Tank in Germfask, Michigan. Part of the World War II Memorial and dedicated to Edward James Doran. July 2026

== Geography ==
According to the United States Census Bureau, the township has a total area of 71.63 square miles (185.52 km^{2}), of which 66.43 square miles (172.05 km^{2}) is land and 5.20 square miles (13.47 km^{2}) (7.26%) is water.

=== Communities ===
- Germfask is an unincorporated community located in the northern part of the township where the Manistique River crosses M-77 on the eastern edge of the Seney National Wildlife Refuge at 46°14′58″N 85°55′33″W. The Germfask 49836 ZIP Code serves most of the township.
