= M-149 (Michigan highway) =

State highway in Schoolcraft County, Michigan, United States

M-149
- M-149 highlighted in red

Route information
- Maintained by MDOT
- Length: 10.605 mi (17.067 km)
- Existed: c. 1930–present

Major junctions
- South end: US 2 in Thompson
- North end: Palms Book State Park

Location
- Country: United States
- State: Michigan
- Counties: Schoolcraft

Highway system
- Michigan State Trunkline Highway System; Interstate; US; State; Byways
← M-147	→ M-150

M-149 is a 10.6-mile (17.1 km) north–south state trunkline highway in the Upper Peninsula of the US state of Michigan. It connects US Highway 2 (US 2) in Thompson with the Palms Book and Indian Lake state parks. The highway was originally designed in the 1930s and extended a few years later. The last major changes to the highway were made in the 1960s when it was completely paved for the first time.

== Route description ==
M-149 is a rural two-lane highway that starts in the community of Thompson southwest of Manistique on Lake Michigan. It runs west-northwesterly through woodlands away from a junction with US 2 along a small pond in the area. The road curves to the north and passes the cemetery and some small farms south of a crossing with a line of the Canadian National Railway. North of the tracks, the road meets County Road 442 (CR 442) near Indian Lake. M-149 turns to the west at that junction while CR 442 runs easterly to connect to the main unit of the Indian Lake State Park. The highway continues to a junction with CR 455, which connects to the western unit of the state park, after which the trunkline turns to the northwest through forested terrain. The highway turns back to the west before intersecting another CR 442 in the area. At this junction, M-149 turns to the north where it continues for several miles until curving eastward. M-149 intersects the northern end of CR 455 and turns north once again until it terminates at the main gate to the Palms Book State Park, home of Kitch-iti-kipi (the Big Spring).

No part of M-189 is listed on the National Highway System. In 2009, the Michigan Department of Transportation conducted a survey to determine the traffic volume along the highway, reported using a metric called average annual daily traffic (AADT). The department determined that 421 vehicles a day used the highway south of the junction with CR 442 near Indian Lake State Park while 245 vehicles used remainder of the highway on average.

== History ==
The Michigan State Highway Department (MSHD) designated M-149 along a gravel road in late 1930; the highway provided access from US 2 northerly to Palms Book State Park. A second highway, the first creation of M-125, was formed later in 1931 along another gravel road to connect US 2 southerly with the Thompson State Fish Hatchery. When US 2 was rerouted in the Manistique area in 1936, that highway was moved further south closer to Lake Michigan; M-149 was extended eastward along a section of the paved highway formerly a part of US 2 to connect with M-125 at the Indian Lake State Park. From that point south, M-149 replaced M-125 to Thompson. The former routing of US 2 became CR 442 except for the section used to extend M-149. In the latter half of 1960 or the beginning of 1961, the MSHD paved the sections of M-149 north and south of the former US 2 segment, completely hard-surfacing the roadway for the first time.

== Major intersections ==
The entire highway is in Schoolcraft County.

Location	mi	km	Destinations	Notes
Thompson	0.000	0.000	US 2 / LMCT – Manistique, Escanaba	
Thompson Township	2.681	4.315	CR 442 east – Indian Lake State Park	
Thompson–Inwood township line	3.649	5.872	CR 455 north – Indian Lake State Park (West Unit)	
Inwood Township	6.051	9.738	CR 442 west	
Thompson Township	10.605	17.067	Palms Book State Park entrance	Roadway continues north as Sawmill Road
1.000 mi = 1.609 km; 1.000 km = 0.621 mi
