= Kitch-iti-kipi =

Spring in Palms Book State Park, Michigan

- Big Spring
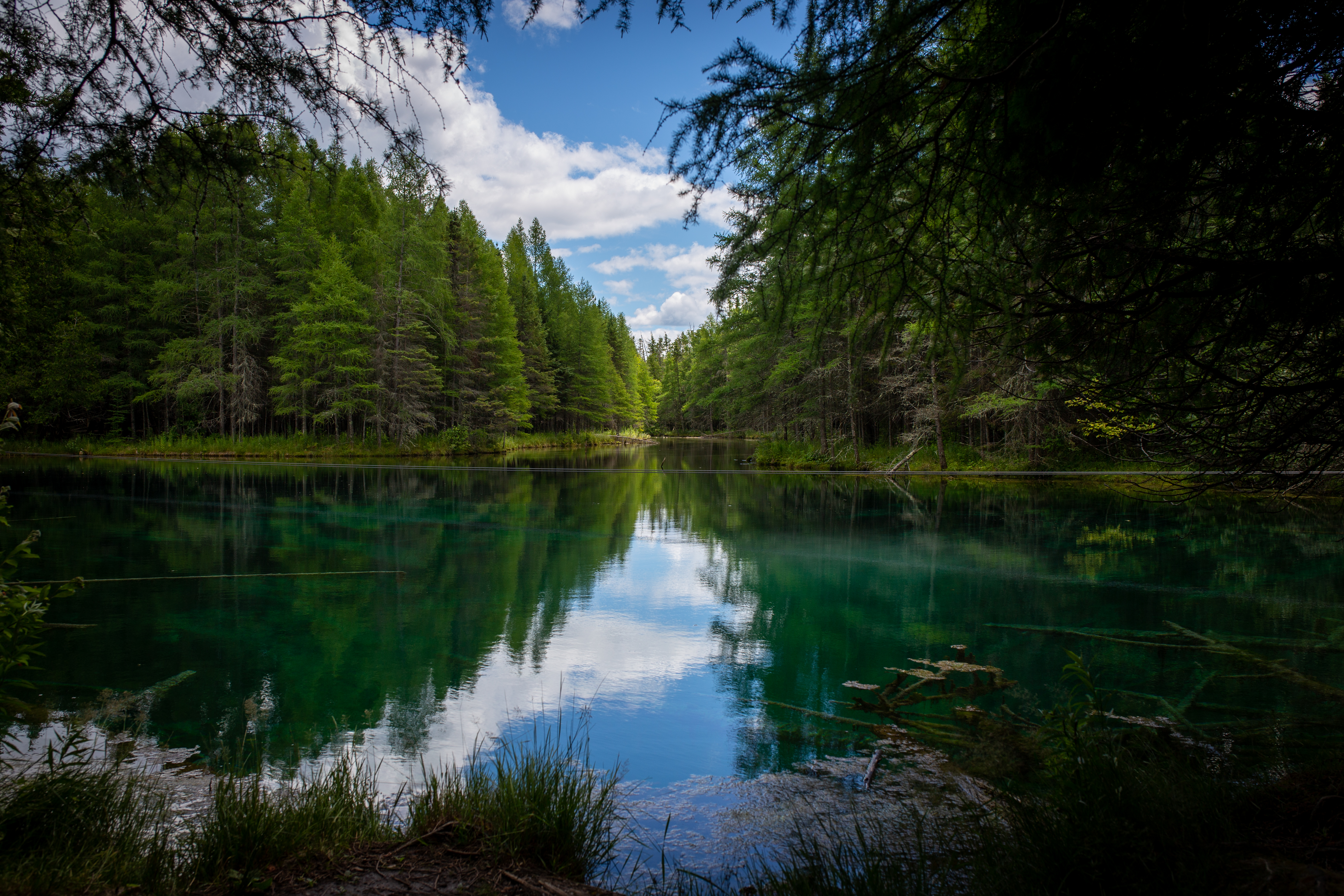
- View of the Kitch-iti-kipi spring

- Location within Michigan Location within the United States
- Interactive map of Kitch-iti-kipi
- Location: Palms Book State Park; Thompson Township, Michigan
- Coordinates: 46°00′14.83″N 86°22′55.24″W
- Elevation: 620 feet (190 m)
- Type: Spring
- Provides water for: Indian Lake
- Depth: 40 feet (12.2 m)

Kitch-iti-kipi (/kɪˌtʃɪtɪˈkiːpi/ kitch-IT-ih-KEE-pee), located within Palms Book State Park, is Michigan's largest natural freshwater spring. The name means "big cold spring" in the Ojibwe language. It is also sometimes referred to as the Big Spring. Kitch-iti-kipi, or "Mirror of Heaven" as it is referred to today, was originally given that name by the Ojibwe.

Kitch-iti-kipi spring is one of the major tourist attractions on Michigan's Upper Peninsula. It is located in Thompson Township within Schoolcraft County just northwest of the city of Manistique. It is also within Palms Book State Park. The state of Michigan was granted the spring with accompanying land in 1926, under the condition that it be turned into a public park. The state has since acquired surrounding land and expanded the park considerably.

== Appearance and features ==
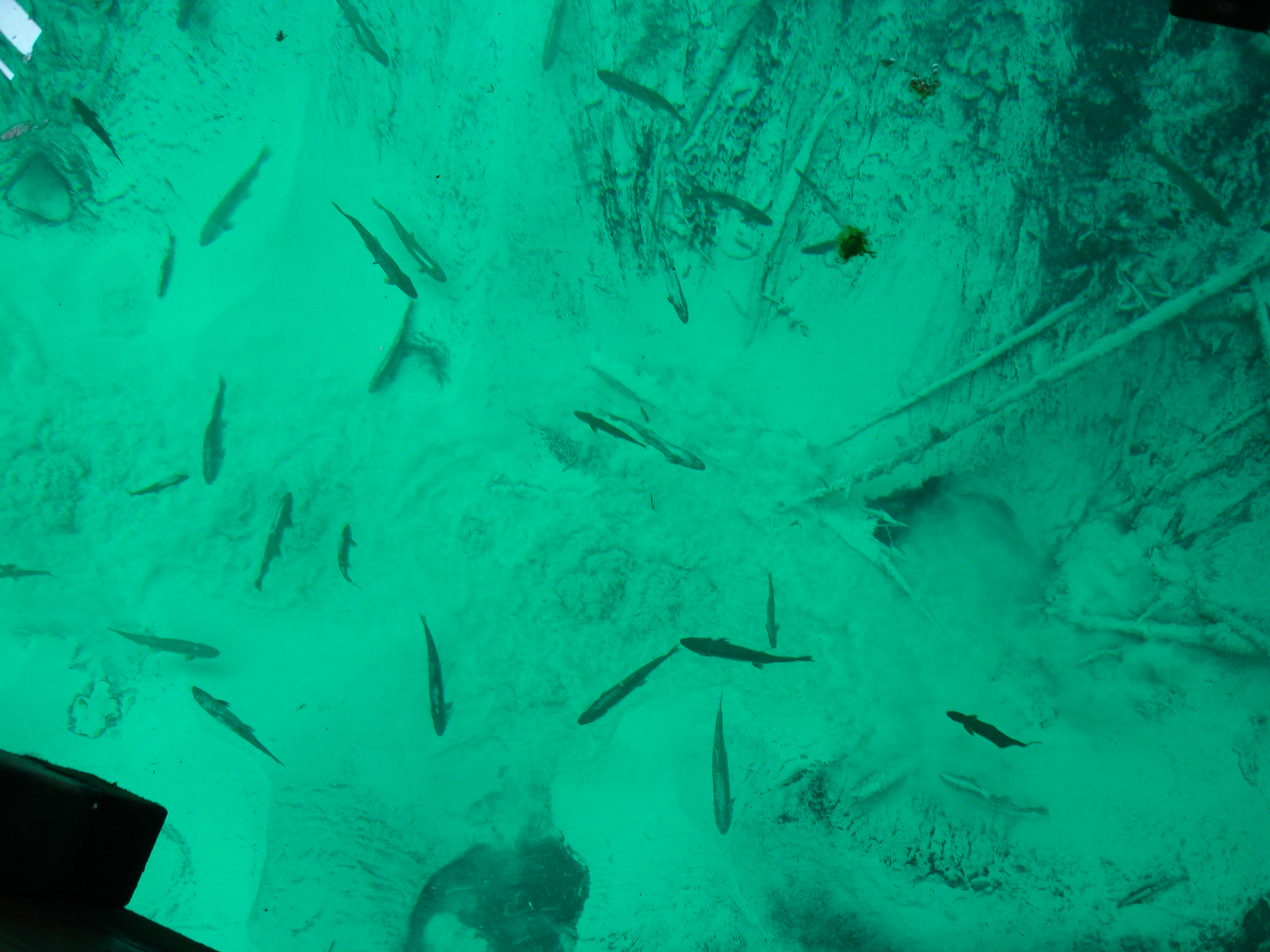
Fish among underwater tree branches

Spring water disturbs the gray dolomite in Kitchi iti Kipi.

Kitch-iti-kipi is an oval pool measuring 300 by 175 feet (91 m × 53 m) and is about 40 feet (12 m) deep with an emerald green bottom. From fissures in underlying limestone flows 10,000 US gallons per minute (630 L/s) of spring water throughout the year at a constant temperature of 45 °F (7 °C).

Hydraulic pressure forces the groundwater to the surface. It has yet to be discovered precisely where this enormous volume of water comes from. The spring's pool bowl is similar to other sinkholes, except that it is connected with an aquifer (underground stream) to nearby Indian Lake. The small spring pool was created when the top layer of limestone dissolved away and collapsed into the cave already made by the underground water.

In the crystal clear waters of the spring, ancient tree trunks with mineral-encrusted branches can be seen, as well as fish. Fish species commonly present in the spring are lake trout, brown trout and brook trout. On occasion, one may spot yellow perch and other species that move between Big Spring and Indian Lake.

The name Kitch-iti-kipi is said to have many meanings in the language of the local indigenous Ojibwe people. Some were "The Great Water", "The Blue Sky I See", and "Bubbling Spring". Other Native Americans called it "The Roaring", "Drum Water", and the "Sound of Thunder"—even though there is total silence coming from the spring. A kaleidoscope effect of ever-changing shapes and forms within the spring is caused by the clouds of sand kept in constant motion by the gushing waters.

== History ==
The state of Michigan acquired Kitch-iti-kipi in 1926. History records that John I. Bellaire, owner of a Manistique Five and Dime store, fell in love with the black hole spring when he discovered it in the thick wilderness of Michigan's Upper Peninsula in the 1920s. It was hidden in a tangle of fallen trees, and loggers used the nearby area as a dump.

Bellaire saw its potential as a public recreation spot. He could have purchased the spring and adjoining property himself; however, he persuaded Frank Palms of the Palms Book Land Company to sell the spring and 90 acres (36 ha) to the state of Michigan for $10. The property deed requires the property "to be forever used as a public park, bearing the name Palms Book State Park." The State of Michigan has since acquired adjacent land, and the park now encompasses over 300 acres (120 ha).

== Raft ==
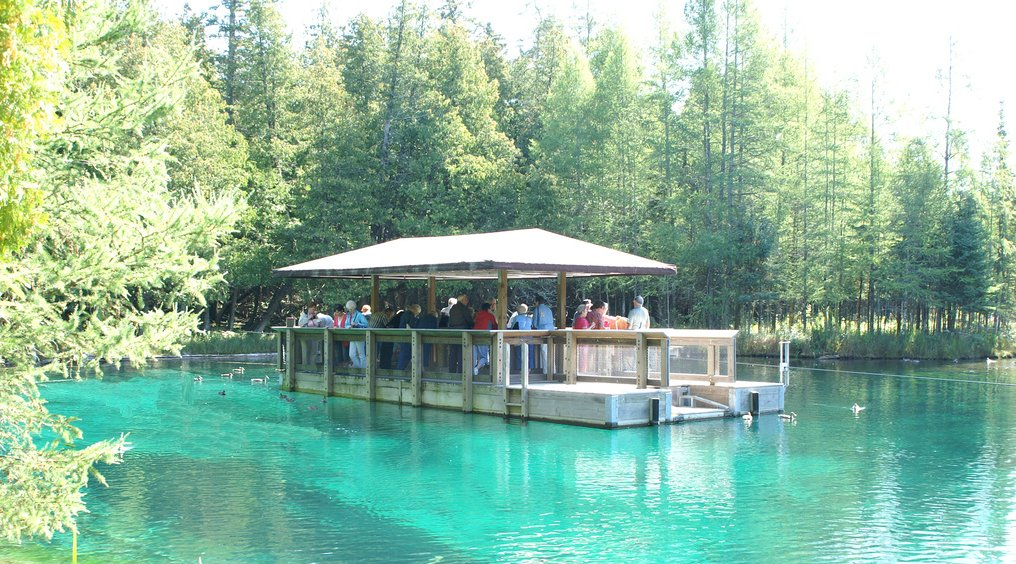
Kitch-iti-kipi viewing raft

A self-operated observation raft guides park visitors to vantage points overlooking the underwater features. This raft is on a cable that is pulled across the spring pool by park visitors or by a park employee. There are viewing windows where visitors can see the fast-flowing spring. Visitors can look over the side of the raft for viewing as well. The Civilian Conservation Corps constructed the raft, dock, concession stand and ranger's quarters with other groups that participated. In 2003, the Michigan Department of Natural Resources and Michigan Civilian Conservation Corps members built a new walkway, covered raft, and dock, and put up interpretive displays.

== Native American legends ==
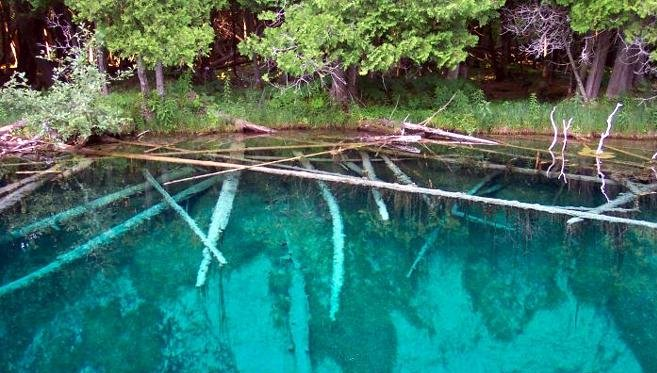
Underwater branches

There are several purported Native American legends regarding Kitch-iti-kipi. However, some sources suggest that Bellaire himself made them up to publicize the park.

One legend goes that Kitch-iti-kipi was the area's young chieftain. He told his girlfriend he loved her far more than the other dark-haired maidens dancing near his birchbark wigwam. She claimed she wanted to put him through a test of love and demanded, "Prove it!" The test of his devotion was that he must set sail in his canoe on this spring lake deep in the conifer swamp. She would then leap from an overhanging branch in an act of faith. He was to catch her from his canoe, proving his love. He then took his fragile canoe onto the lake's icy waters, looking for her. Eventually, his canoe tipped over in the endeavor. He drowned in the attempt to satisfy the vanity of his love for this Native American maiden. It turned out that she was back at her village with other Native American maidens, laughing about his frivolous quest. The spring was then named in his memory.

Another legend was that Native American maidens of the area would take a drop of honey on a piece of birch bark and dip it into the spring. This would then be presented to a young chieftain that they adored making him true forever.

Another legend talks about the tamarack trees growing on the banks of the spring. A small piece of the bark was ground in a mortar and pestle by a local inhabitant. The remnants were then placed in the individual's empty pockets and magically replaced by glittering gold at midnight that night.

Other Native American legends tell of local parents who came to the pool seeking names for their newborn sons or daughters. They supposedly found names like Satu (darling), Kakushika (big eye), Natukoro (lovely flower), and We-shi (little fish) in the sounds of the rippling water. Still, other legends say the Native Americans had even attributed special healing powers to the spring waters.

In 2020, a book titled The Legend of Kitch-iti-kipi, based on the legend of the spring, was published in the United States. The author, Carole Lynn Hare, is a member of the Sault Ste. Marie Tribe of Chippewa Indians. The short book received a positive review, described as being an excellent introduction to Ojibwe life and mythology.
