= Cusino Township, Schoolcraft County, Michigan =

Cusino Township, Michigan
- Former civil township
- Location in the state of Michigan
- Coordinates: 46°25′35″N 86°18′24″W
- Country: United States
- State: Michigan
- County: Schoolcraft
- Established: 1907
- Disestablished: 1913
- Time zone: UTC-5 (Eastern (EST))

Cusino Township was a civil township in Schoolcraft County in the U.S. state of Michigan. It was first established on March 7, 1907. It was combined with and incorporated into Hiawatha Township on April 16, 1913.
