= Gulliver Lake =

Lake in Schoolcraft County, Michigan, United States

- Location within Michigan Location within the United States
- Location: Doyle Township, Schoolcraft County, Michigan
- Coordinates: 45.9827342°N 86.0275989°W
- Primary inflows: Gents Creek
- Primary outflows: Gulliver Lake Outlet
- Basin countries: United States
- Surface area: 881 acres (357 ha)
- Max. depth: 28 feet (8.5 m)
- Surface elevation: 614 feet (187 m)
- Settlements: Gulliver

Gulliver Lake is a 881-acre (357 ha) lake in Doyle Township, Schoolcraft County, Michigan. The lake has a public boat launch on the northwest corner and it has a maximum depth of 28 feet (8.5 m). The lake drains into Lake Michigan through the Gulliver Lake Outlet.

== See also ==
- List of lakes of Michigan
