= Little Harbor, Michigan =

Little Harbor
- Interactive map of Little Harbor
- Coordinates: 45°47′26″N 86°23′18″W
- Country: United States
- State: Michigan
- County: Schoolcraft
- Founded: between 1885 and 1887

Little Harbor is a former settlement in Schoolcraft County, Michigan, United States, on the north shore of Lake Michigan.

Little Harbor was located between Garden and Thompson on the Garden Peninsula. It was a steam powered sawmill town founded between 1885 and 1887 by Alfred Tracy and William L. Marble (although some fishing cabins existed at the harbor at the time of Meriweathers survey for the United States Geological Survey in 1848). The entrance to the town is from the southeast with a narrow passage which leads to a natural twenty-foot deep harbor which is protected from all sides. The land entrance was a stairway that led from the bluff to the town site.

The town was about three blocks long and consisted of two rows of houses, a boarding house, store, and pool hall. A wharf then went out several hundred feet into the harbor. There was a brick furnace, a sawmill and shingle mill combined. This was a common sawmill at the time because cedar was often mixed with stands of white pine and there was a market for shingles, hardwood flooring and lath as well as dimensional lumber.

The logs were cut and brought to the top of the bluff in the winter by a man and team of horses and then rolled down to the live logs skidway. After the economic panic of 1893, the town was sold to Martin Valetine who ran the town for a number of years, finally selling it to Isaac and Bill Bonifas and later to Ben Miller. By this time, the timber was nearly gone and Miller dismantled the mill and stored it on the shore for shipment. The only known pirate of the Great Lakes, Dan Seavey, stole all the equipment and sold it. In the early 1900s the town was used as a fishing port but eventually the wharf was washed away and none of the houses remain.
