= Doyle Township, Michigan =

- Civil township
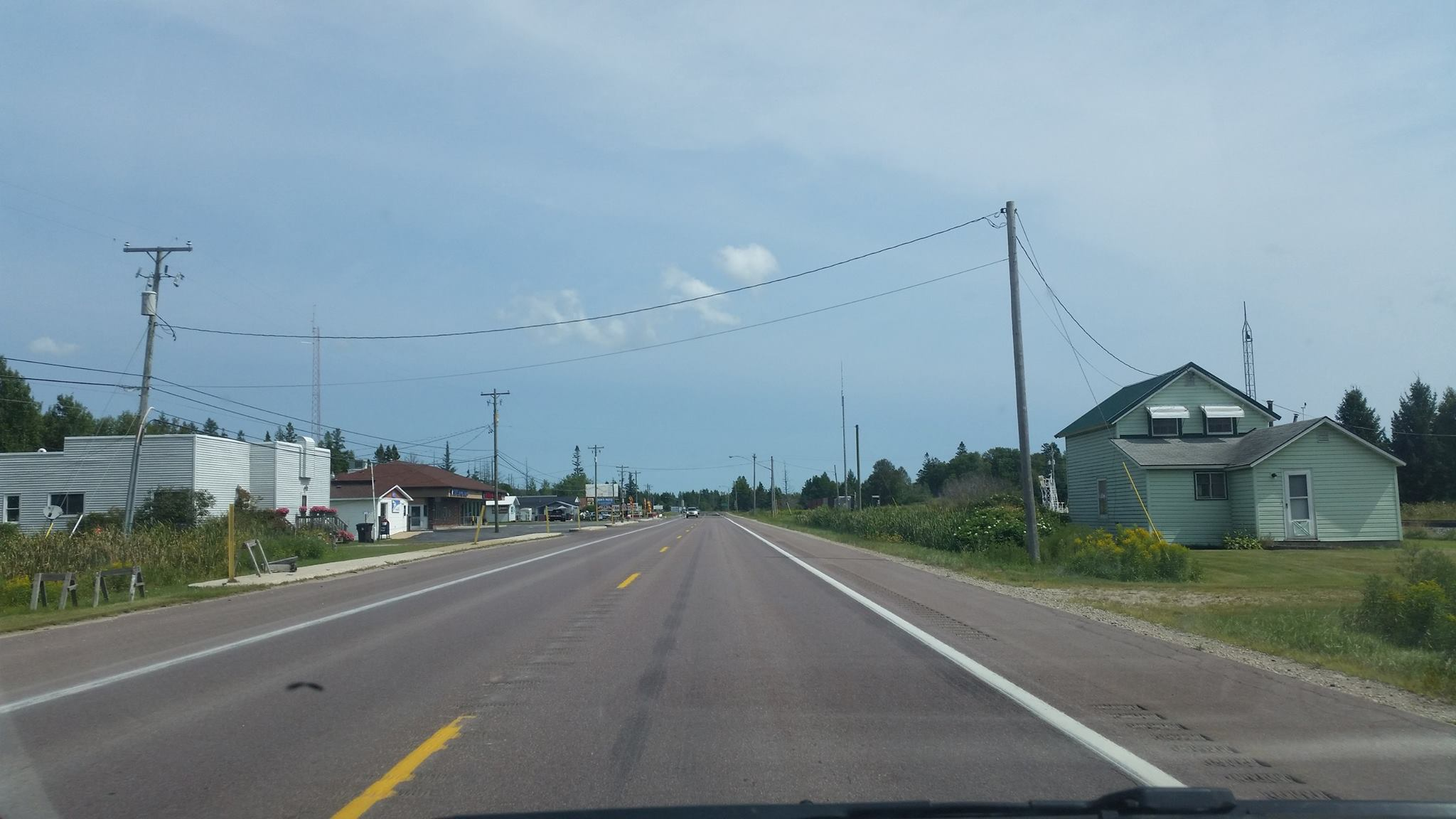
- The community of Gulliver along U.S. Route 2

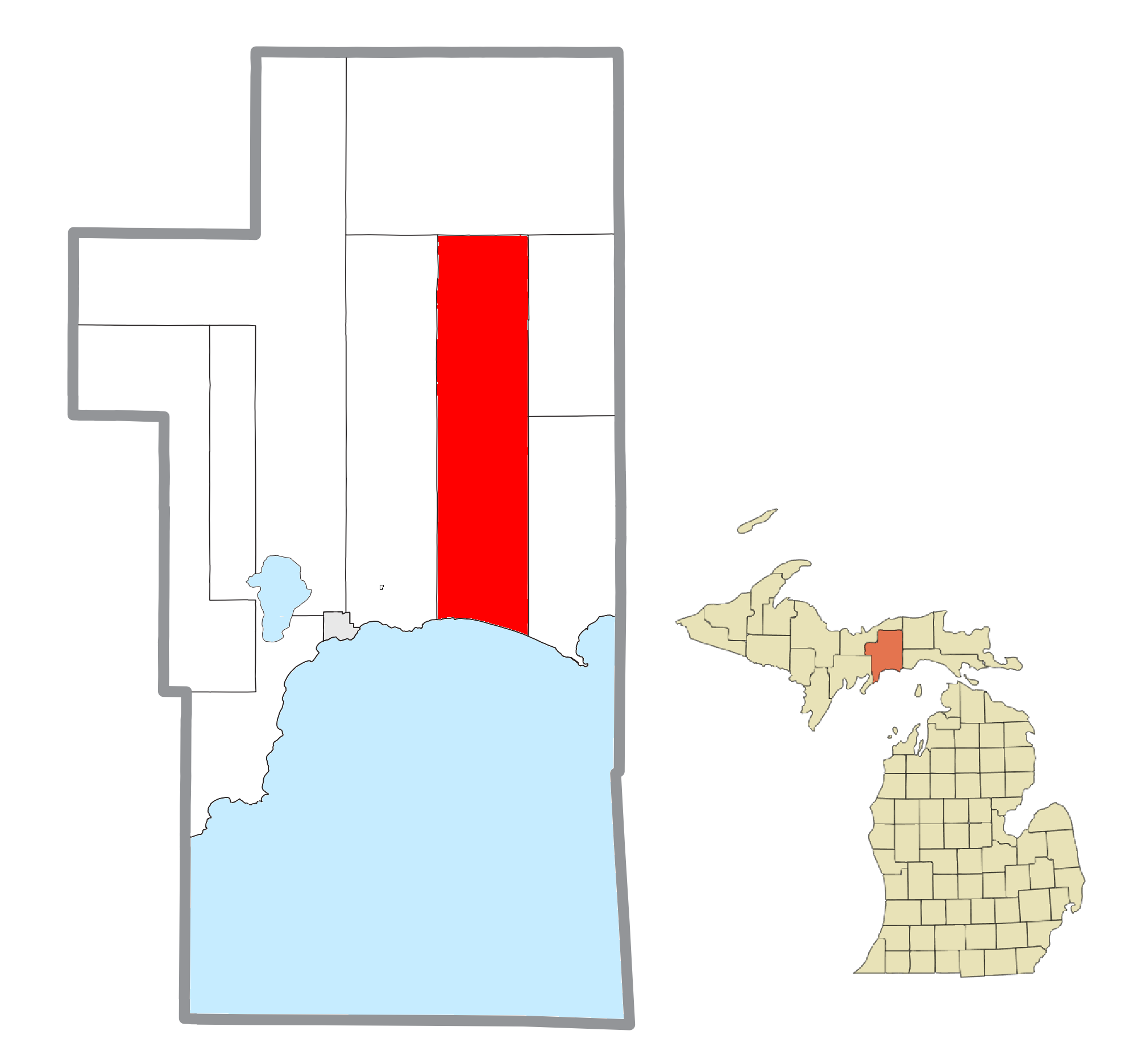
- Location within Schoolcraft County

- Location within the state of Michigan Doyle Township (the United States)
- Coordinates: 46°07′01″N 86°01′51″W
- Country: United States
- State: Michigan
- County: Schoolcraft
- Established: 1890

Government
  - Supervisor: Lynn Norton
  - Clerk: Patti Hoffman

Area
  - Total: 154.19 sq mi (399.4 km^{2})
  - Land: 146.12 sq mi (378.4 km^{2})
  - Water: 8.07 sq mi (20.9 km^{2})
- Elevation: 669 ft (204 m)

Population (2020)
  - Total: 563
  - Density: 3.85/sq mi (1.49/km^{2})
- Time zone: UTC-5 (Eastern (EST))
  - Summer (DST): UTC-4 (EDT)
- ZIP code(s): 49836 (Germfask); 49840 (Gulliver); 49854 (Manistique); 49883 (Seney)
- Area code: 906
- FIPS code: 26-22960
- GNIS feature ID: 1626192
- Website: Official website

Doyle Township is a civil township of Schoolcraft County in the U.S. state of Michigan. The population was 563 in 2020. This area is known for its pristine beaches on Lake Michigan and inland lakes, such as Gulliver Lake, McDonald Lake, and Clear Lake, among others.

== Geography ==
According to the United States Census Bureau, the township has a total area of 154.19 square miles (399.35 km^{2}), of which 146.12 square miles (378.45 km^{2}) is land and 8.07 square miles (20.90 km^{2}) (5.23%) is water.

=== Communities ===
- Gulliver is an unincorporated community in the township on U.S. 2 on the shores of Gulliver Lake.
- Whitedale is a defunct town located near Gulliver. The town was abandoned in the 1950s.
