= M149 =

M149 may refer to:

- M-149 (Michigan highway)
- M149 (Cape Town), a Metropolitan Route in Cape Town, South Africa
