= Indian Lake State Park =

Indian Lake State Park can refer to either of two state parks in the United States:

- Indian Lake State Park (Michigan)
- Indian Lake State Park (Ohio)
