= 1948 United States presidential election in Michigan =

- November 2, 1948

All 19 Michigan votes to the Electoral College
- Turnout: 52.2%
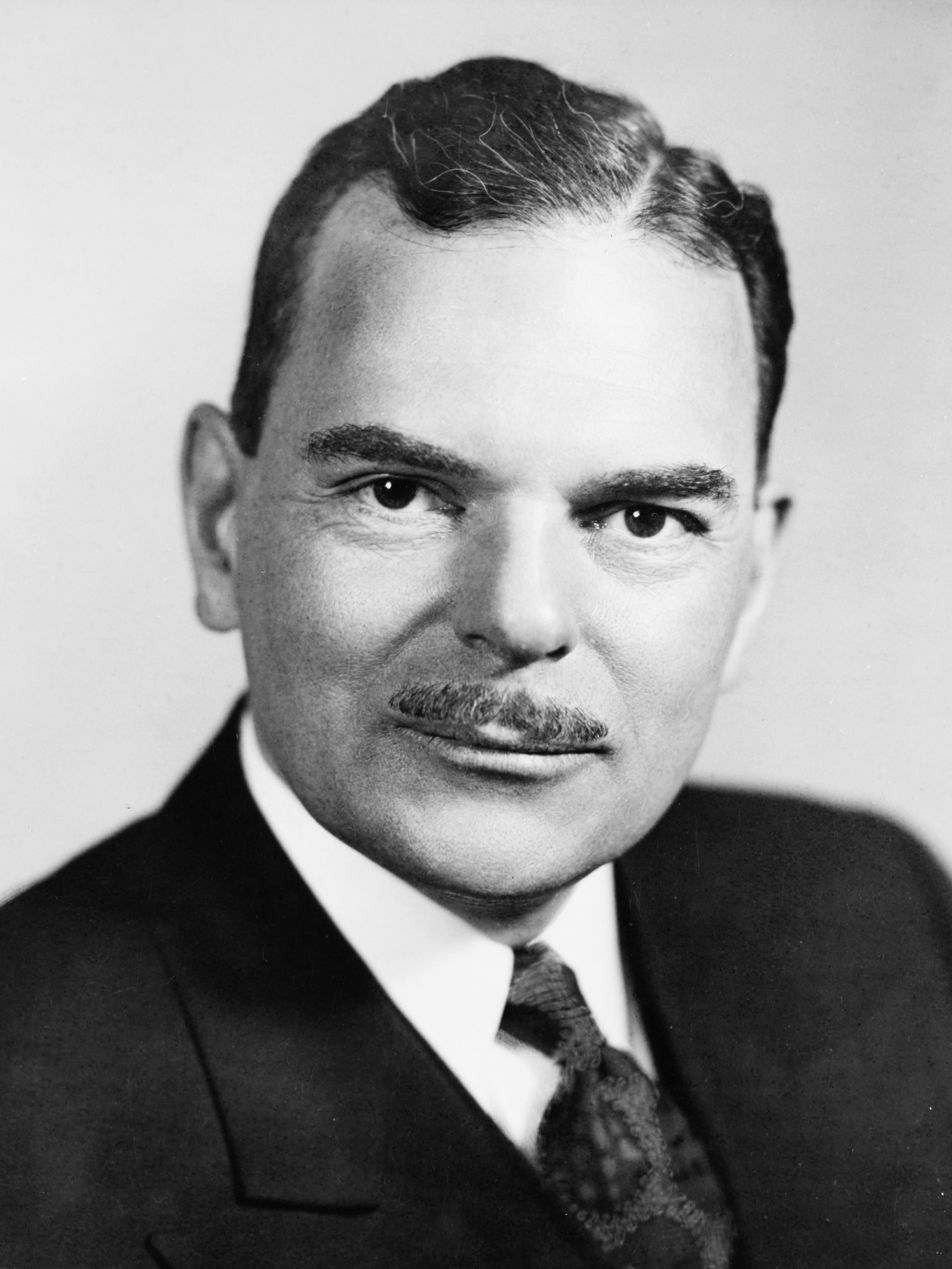

Nominee	Thomas E. Dewey	Harry S. Truman
Party	Republican	Democratic
Home state	New York	Missouri
Running mate	Earl Warren	Alben W. Barkley
Electoral vote	19	0
Popular vote	1,038,595	1,003,448
Percentage	49.23%	47.57%
County results
Dewey
40–50%
50–60%
60–70%
70–80%
Truman
50–60%
President before election
Harry S. Truman
Democratic
Elected President
Harry S. Truman
Democratic

The 1948 United States presidential election in Michigan took place on November 2, 1948, as part of the 1948 United States presidential election. Voters chose 19 representatives, or electors, to the Electoral College, who voted for president and vice president.

Michigan was won by Governor Thomas E. Dewey (R–New York), running with Governor Earl Warren, with 49.23% of the popular vote, against incumbent President Harry S. Truman (D–Missouri), running with Senator Alben W. Barkley, with 47.57% of the popular vote.

Michigan weighed in for this election as around 7% more Republican than the nation-at-large. Dewey's victory was the first of three consecutive Republican victories in the state, as Michigan would not vote for a Democratic candidate again until John F. Kennedy narrowly won the state in 1960.

== Results ==
1948 United States presidential election in Michigan
Party	Candidate	Votes	%
Republican	Thomas E. Dewey	1,038,595	49.23%
Democratic	Harry S. Truman (inc.)	1,003,448	47.57%
Progressive	Henry A. Wallace	46,515	2.20%
Prohibition	Claude A. Watson	13,052	0.62%
Socialist	Norman Thomas	6,063	0.29%
Socialist Labor	Edward A. Teichert	1,263	0.06%
Socialist Workers	Farrell Dobbs	672	0.03%
Write-in	Scattering	1	0.00%
Total votes		2,109,609	100.00%

=== Results by county ===
County	Thomas E. Dewey Republican		Harry S. Truman Democratic		Henry A. Wallace Progressive		Claude A. Watson Prohibition		All Others Various		Margin		Total votes cast
County	#	%	#	%	#	%	#	%	#	%	#	%	Total votes cast
Alcona	1,425	65.73%	708	32.66%	8	0.37%	23	1.06%	4	0.18%	717	33.07%	2,168
Alger	1,702	42.73%	2,009	50.44%	245	6.15%	22	0.55%	5	0.13%	-307	-7.71%	3,983
Allegan	10,439	67.68%	4,594	29.78%	148	0.96%	203	1.32%	40	0.26%	5,845	37.90%	15,424
Alpena	4,313	60.30%	2,743	38.35%	45	0.63%	37	0.52%	14	0.20%	1,570	21.95%	7,152
Antrim	2,588	67.24%	1,129	29.33%	51	1.33%	70	1.82%	11	0.29%	1,459	37.91%	3,849
Arenac	1,790	58.86%	1,203	39.56%	23	0.76%	19	0.62%	6	0.20%	587	19.30%	3,041
Baraga	1,878	50.11%	1,656	44.18%	201	5.36%	4	0.11%	9	0.24%	222	5.93%	3,748
Barry	5,677	64.75%	2,726	31.09%	55	0.63%	296	3.38%	14	0.16%	2,951	33.66%	8,768
Bay	13,321	47.58%	14,349	51.25%	117	0.42%	127	0.45%	83	0.30%	-1,028	-3.67%	27,997
Benzie	2,013	65.17%	964	31.21%	69	2.23%	29	0.94%	14	0.45%	1,049	33.96%	3,089
Berrien	22,003	58.89%	14,516	38.85%	460	1.23%	223	0.60%	159	0.43%	7,487	20.04%	37,361
Branch	6,323	63.06%	3,405	33.96%	40	0.40%	241	2.40%	18	0.18%	2,918	29.10%	10,027
Calhoun	19,285	54.95%	15,077	42.96%	233	0.66%	372	1.06%	129	0.37%	4,208	11.99%	35,096
Cass	5,615	62.17%	3,201	35.44%	88	0.97%	95	1.05%	33	0.37%	2,414	26.73%	9,032
Charlevoix	2,911	59.47%	1,847	37.73%	53	1.08%	67	1.37%	17	0.35%	1,064	21.74%	4,895
Cheboygan	3,184	62.32%	1,842	36.05%	34	0.67%	39	0.76%	10	0.20%	1,342	26.27%	5,109
Chippewa	4,977	53.34%	3,860	41.37%	186	1.99%	297	3.18%	11	0.12%	1,117	11.97%	9,331
Clare	2,512	66.02%	1,197	31.46%	31	0.81%	53	1.39%	12	0.32%	1,315	34.56%	3,805
Clinton	7,510	73.69%	2,523	24.76%	50	0.49%	84	0.82%	24	0.24%	4,987	48.93%	10,191
Crawford	849	63.93%	455	34.26%	16	1.20%	7	0.53%	1	0.08%	394	29.67%	1,328
Delta	5,414	42.86%	6,943	54.96%	206	1.63%	34	0.27%	36	0.28%	-1,529	-12.10%	12,633
Dickinson	4,417	39.06%	6,295	55.66%	463	4.09%	93	0.82%	41	0.36%	-1,878	-16.60%	11,309
Eaton	8,637	64.84%	4,264	32.01%	87	0.65%	271	2.03%	61	0.46%	4,373	32.83%	13,320
Emmet	3,565	63.42%	1,922	34.19%	73	1.30%	46	0.82%	15	0.27%	1,643	29.23%	5,621
Genesee	38,270	44.38%	45,032	52.22%	1,954	2.27%	667	0.77%	305	0.35%	-6,762	-7.84%	86,228
Gladwin	2,062	66.43%	963	31.02%	25	0.81%	48	1.55%	6	0.19%	1,099	35.41%	3,104
Gogebic	5,204	41.40%	6,722	53.48%	561	4.46%	44	0.35%	38	0.30%	-1,518	-12.08%	12,569
Grand Traverse	5,473	68.28%	2,365	29.51%	88	1.10%	73	0.91%	16	0.20%	3,108	38.77%	8,015
Gratiot	7,035	70.16%	2,659	26.52%	46	0.46%	271	2.70%	16	0.16%	4,376	43.64%	10,027
Hillsdale	7,232	67.21%	3,095	28.76%	83	0.77%	322	2.99%	28	0.26%	4,137	38.45%	10,760
Houghton	9,541	54.61%	6,925	39.64%	912	5.22%	70	0.40%	23	0.13%	2,616	14.97%	17,471
Huron	7,978	74.92%	2,562	24.06%	50	0.47%	36	0.34%	22	0.21%	5,416	50.86%	10,648
Ingham	31,868	60.61%	19,366	36.83%	499	0.95%	501	0.95%	341	0.65%	12,502	23.78%	52,575
Ionia	7,970	62.60%	4,450	34.95%	44	0.35%	243	1.91%	24	0.19%	3,520	27.65%	12,731
Iosco	2,599	68.90%	1,115	29.56%	24	0.64%	27	0.72%	7	0.19%	1,484	39.34%	3,772
Iron	3,659	44.56%	4,125	50.23%	260	3.17%	109	1.33%	59	0.72%	-466	-5.67%	8,212
Isabella	5,485	67.23%	2,487	30.49%	39	0.48%	127	1.56%	20	0.25%	2,998	36.74%	8,158
Jackson	21,449	61.22%	12,809	36.56%	262	0.75%	429	1.22%	88	0.25%	8,640	24.66%	35,037
Kalamazoo	23,799	57.32%	16,393	39.49%	528	1.27%	515	1.24%	282	0.68%	7,406	17.83%	41,517
Kalkaska	837	65.54%	400	31.32%	15	1.17%	22	1.72%	3	0.23%	437	34.22%	1,277
Kent	53,669	54.33%	43,205	43.74%	881	0.89%	706	0.71%	315	0.32%	10,464	10.59%	98,776
Keweenaw	814	50.09%	647	39.82%	154	9.48%	7	0.43%	3	0.18%	167	10.27%	1,625
Lake	1,348	54.14%	1,077	43.25%	55	2.21%	9	0.36%	1	0.04%	271	10.89%	2,490
Lapeer	8,358	62.85%	4,668	35.10%	105	0.79%	131	0.99%	36	0.27%	3,690	27.75%	13,298
Leelanau	1,928	69.01%	835	29.89%	15	0.54%	9	0.32%	7	0.25%	1,093	39.12%	2,794
Lenawee	14,369	67.49%	6,529	30.67%	94	0.44%	242	1.14%	57	0.27%	7,840	36.82%	21,291
Livingston	7,368	70.99%	2,813	27.10%	83	0.80%	101	0.97%	14	0.13%	4,555	43.89%	10,379
Luce	1,273	67.46%	570	30.21%	29	1.54%	13	0.69%	2	0.11%	703	37.25%	1,887
Mackinac	2,182	64.90%	1,138	33.85%	19	0.57%	21	0.62%	2	0.06%	1,044	31.05%	3,362
Macomb	21,205	44.49%	25,265	53.01%	917	1.92%	136	0.29%	137	0.29%	-4,060	-8.52%	47,660
Manistee	3,913	52.89%	3,339	45.13%	82	1.11%	42	0.57%	23	0.31%	574	7.76%	7,399
Marquette	8,591	45.06%	10,003	52.47%	330	1.73%	84	0.44%	56	0.29%	-1,412	-7.41%	19,064
Mason	4,147	55.99%	2,988	40.34%	191	2.58%	73	0.99%	8	0.11%	1,159	15.65%	7,407
Mecosta	3,803	68.44%	1,572	28.29%	35	0.63%	144	2.59%	3	0.05%	2,231	40.15%	5,557
Menominee	4,420	45.72%	5,094	52.69%	69	0.71%	54	0.56%	30	0.31%	-674	-6.97%	9,667
Midland	5,811	63.19%	3,204	34.84%	56	0.61%	100	1.09%	25	0.27%	2,607	28.35%	9,196
Missaukee	1,742	68.21%	750	29.37%	16	0.63%	43	1.68%	3	0.12%	992	38.84%	2,554
Monroe	11,070	50.72%	10,434	47.81%	153	0.70%	133	0.61%	34	0.16%	636	2.91%	21,824
Montcalm	6,081	65.14%	2,999	32.13%	82	0.88%	148	1.59%	25	0.27%	3,082	33.01%	9,335
Montmorency	1,054	64.11%	553	33.64%	12	0.73%	19	1.16%	6	0.36%	501	30.47%	1,644
Muskegon	15,382	41.45%	20,631	55.60%	555	1.50%	391	1.05%	148	0.40%	-5,249	-14.15%	37,107
Newaygo	4,394	66.92%	2,027	30.87%	73	1.11%	54	0.82%	18	0.27%	2,367	36.05%	6,566
Oakland	62,516	53.49%	51,491	44.06%	1,964	1.68%	455	0.39%	440	0.38%	11,025	9.43%	116,866
Oceana	2,943	60.07%	1,714	34.99%	59	1.20%	169	3.45%	14	0.29%	1,229	25.08%	4,899
Ogemaw	2,062	64.70%	1,038	32.57%	42	1.32%	36	1.13%	9	0.28%	1,024	32.13%	3,187
Ontonagon	2,561	50.18%	2,163	42.38%	369	7.23%	5	0.10%	6	0.12%	398	7.80%	5,104
Osceola	3,122	68.54%	1,276	28.01%	17	0.37%	134	2.94%	6	0.13%	1,846	40.53%	4,555
Oscoda	785	72.08%	285	26.17%	6	0.55%	10	0.92%	3	0.28%	500	45.91%	1,089
Otsego	1,392	60.00%	888	38.28%	23	0.99%	13	0.56%	4	0.17%	504	21.72%	2,320
Ottawa	16,028	63.38%	8,789	34.76%	134	0.53%	225	0.89%	112	0.44%	7,239	28.62%	25,288
Presque Isle	2,271	54.53%	1,872	44.95%	14	0.34%	6	0.14%	2	0.05%	399	9.58%	4,165
Roscommon	2,055	73.89%	687	24.70%	23	0.83%	8	0.29%	8	0.29%	1,368	49.19%	2,781
Saginaw	22,923	56.28%	16,995	41.72%	248	0.61%	482	1.18%	85	0.21%	5,928	14.56%	40,733
Sanilac	8,237	77.66%	2,167	20.43%	45	0.42%	142	1.34%	15	0.14%	6,070	57.23%	10,606
Schoolcraft	1,713	49.70%	1,651	47.90%	44	1.28%	25	0.73%	14	0.41%	62	1.80%	3,447
Shiawassee	10,377	66.97%	4,852	31.31%	93	0.60%	148	0.96%	26	0.17%	5,525	35.66%	15,496
St. Clair	17,883	61.79%	10,647	36.79%	219	0.76%	138	0.48%	55	0.19%	7,236	25.00%	28,942
St. Joseph	8,166	65.66%	3,928	31.59%	60	0.48%	248	1.99%	34	0.27%	4,238	34.07%	12,436
Tuscola	8,125	73.59%	2,676	24.24%	57	0.52%	161	1.46%	22	0.20%	5,449	49.35%	11,041
Van Buren	9,511	67.92%	4,082	29.15%	266	1.90%	104	0.74%	41	0.29%	5,429	38.77%	14,004
Washtenaw	24,588	63.75%	12,721	32.98%	790	2.05%	172	0.45%	296	0.77%	11,867	30.77%	38,567
Wayne	321,773	38.03%	489,654	57.87%	29,615	3.50%	1,268	0.15%	3,796	0.45%	-167,881	-19.84%	846,106
Wexford	3,833	57.06%	2,635	39.23%	49	0.73%	187	2.78%	13	0.19%	1,198	17.83%	6,717
Totals	1,038,595	49.23%	1,003,448	47.57%	46,515	2.20%	13,052	0.62%	7,999	0.38%	35,147	1.66%	2,109,609

==== Counties that flipped from Democratic to Republican ====
- Baraga
- Houghton
- Keweenaw
- Ontonagon
- Schoolcraft

==== Counties that flipped from Republican to Democratic ====
- Menominee

== See also ==
- United States presidential elections in Michigan
