= Seney Township, Michigan =

- Civil township
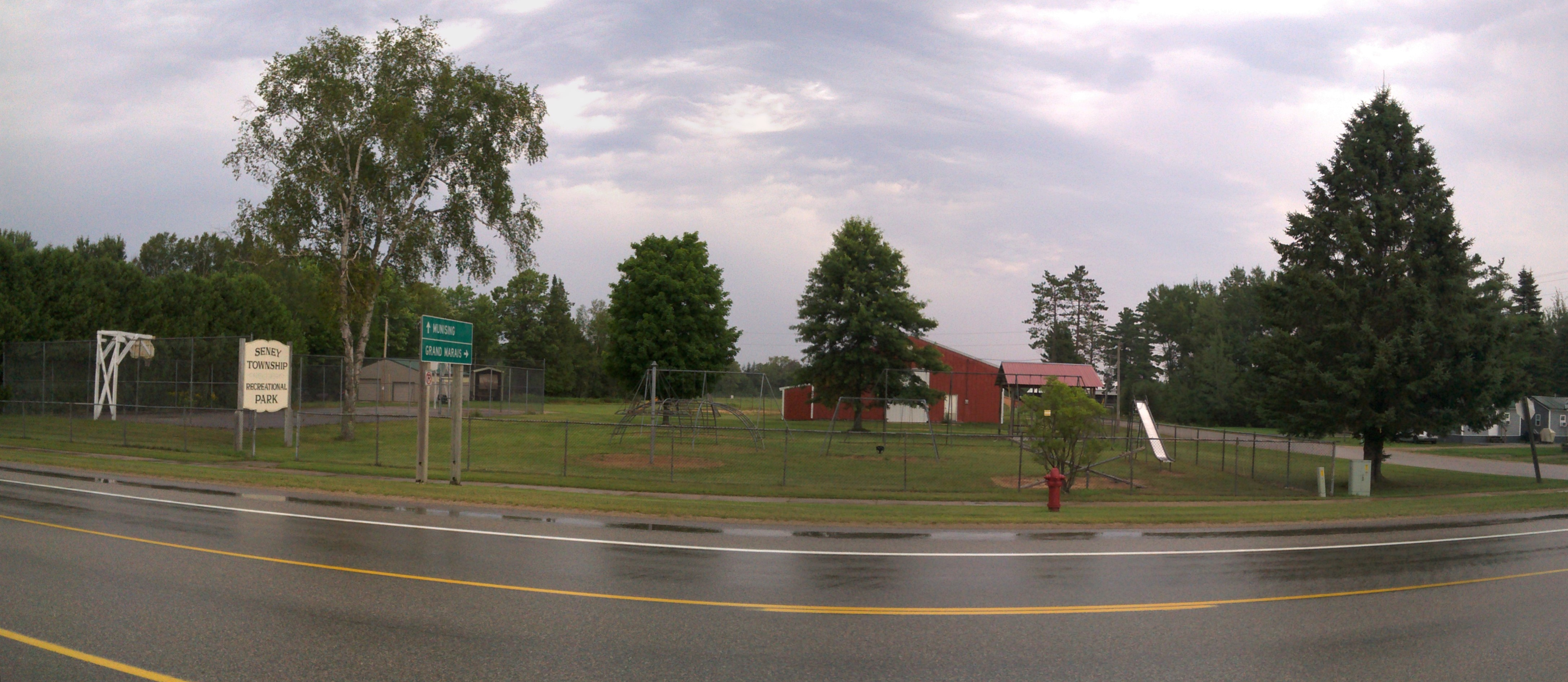
- Seney Township Recreational Park

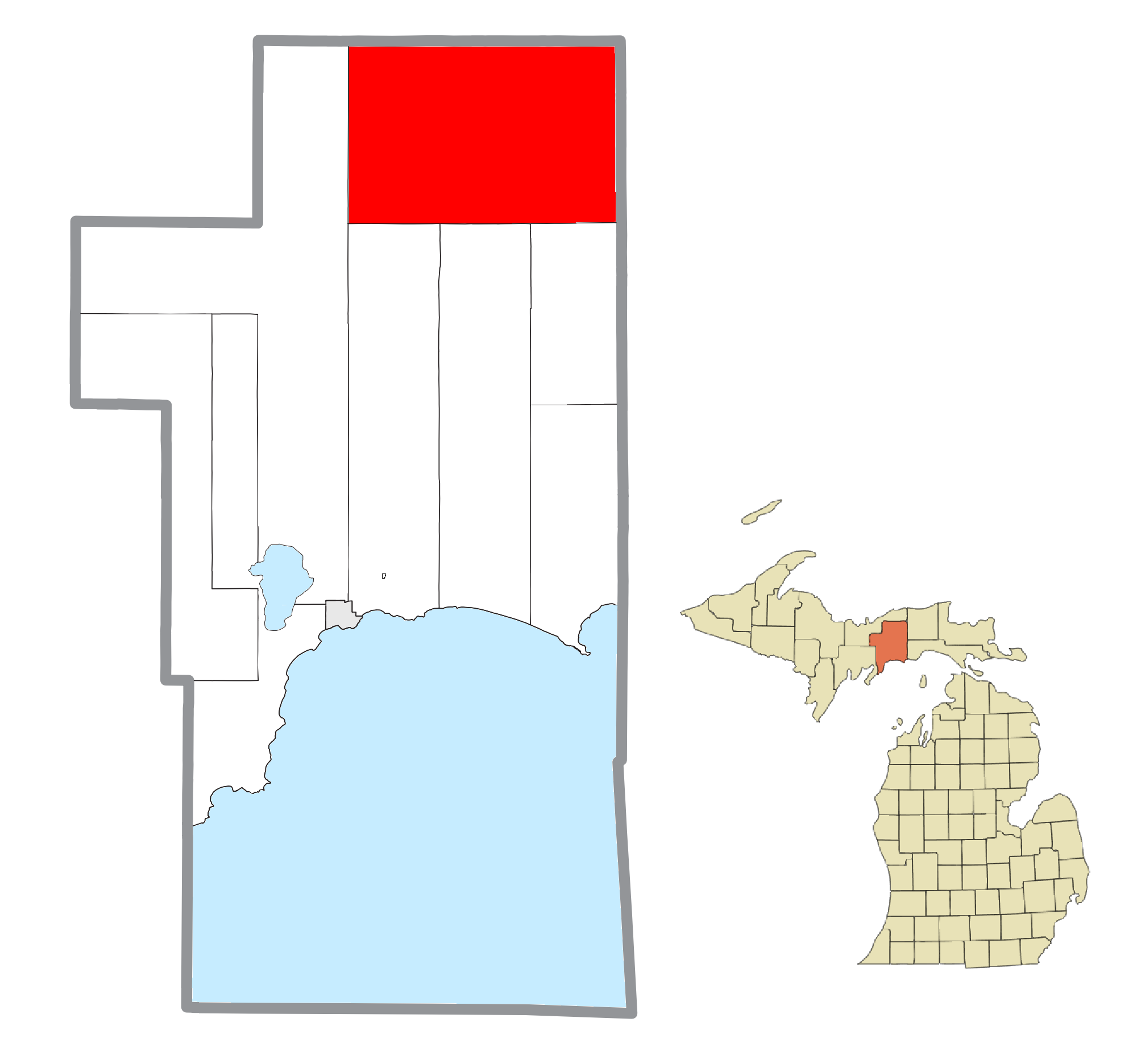
- Location within Schoolcraft County

- Location within the state of Michigan Location within the United States
- Coordinates: 46°25′18″N 86°01′08″W
- Country: United States
- State: Michigan
- County: Schoolcraft

Government
  - Supervisor: Marc Schooley
  - Clerk: Janice Bonifield

Area
  - Total: 215.50 sq mi (558.1 km^{2})
  - Land: 212.63 sq mi (550.7 km^{2})
  - Water: 2.87 sq mi (7.4 km^{2})
- Elevation: 784 ft (239 m)

Population (2020)
  - Total: 115
  - Density: 0.56/sq mi (0.22/km^{2})
- Time zone: UTC-5 (Eastern (EST))
  - Summer (DST): UTC-4 (EDT)
- ZIP code(s): 49853 (McMillan); 49883 (Seney); 49884 (Shingleton)
- Area code: 906
- FIPS code: 26-72500
- GNIS feature ID: 1627059

Seney Township is a civil township of Schoolcraft County in the U.S. state of Michigan. As of 2020, its population was 115. With a population density of only 0.560/sq mi (0.216/km^{2}), Seney Township is the second least-densely populated municipality in the state after West Branch Township.

== History ==
Seney Township was once the site of a Boot Hill cemetery. The historic community of Seney, Michigan is located in the township.

== Geography ==
According to the United States Census Bureau, the township has a total area of 215.50 square miles (558.14 km^{2}), of which 212.63 square miles (550.71 km^{2}) is land and 2.87 square miles (7.43 km^{2}) (1.33%) is water.

== Demographics ==
In 2000, there were 180 people, 56 households, and 45 families residing in the township. The population density was 0.8 per square mile (0.3/km^{2}). There were 186 housing units at an average density of 0.9 per square mile (0.3/km^{2}). The racial makeup of the township was 94.44% White, 0.56% Native American, 0.56% from other races, and 4.44% from two or more races. Hispanic or Latino of any race were 0.56% of the population. By 2020, its population was 115.

In 2000, there were 56 households, out of which 23.2% had children under the age of 18 living with them, 62.5% were married couples living together, 14.3% had a female householder with no husband present, and 19.6% were non-families. 17.9% of all households were made up of individuals, and 10.7% had someone living alone who was 65 years of age or older. The average household size was 2.66 and the average family size was 2.91. In the township the population was spread out, with 24.4% under the age of 18, 2.2% from 18 to 24, 21.7% from 25 to 44, 26.7% from 45 to 64, and 25.0% who were 65 years of age or older. The median age was 46 years. For every 100 females, there were 78.2 males. For every 100 females age 18 and over, there were 91.5 males.

In 2000, the median income for a household in the township was $30,625, and the median income for a family was $31,875. Males had a median income of $26,875 versus $11,250 for females. The per capita income for the township was $10,855. About 25.7% of families and 33.1% of the population were below the poverty line, including none of those under the age of eighteen and 40.9% of those 65 or over. As of 2021, its median household income was $45,500.
