= Thompson Township, Michigan =

- Civil township
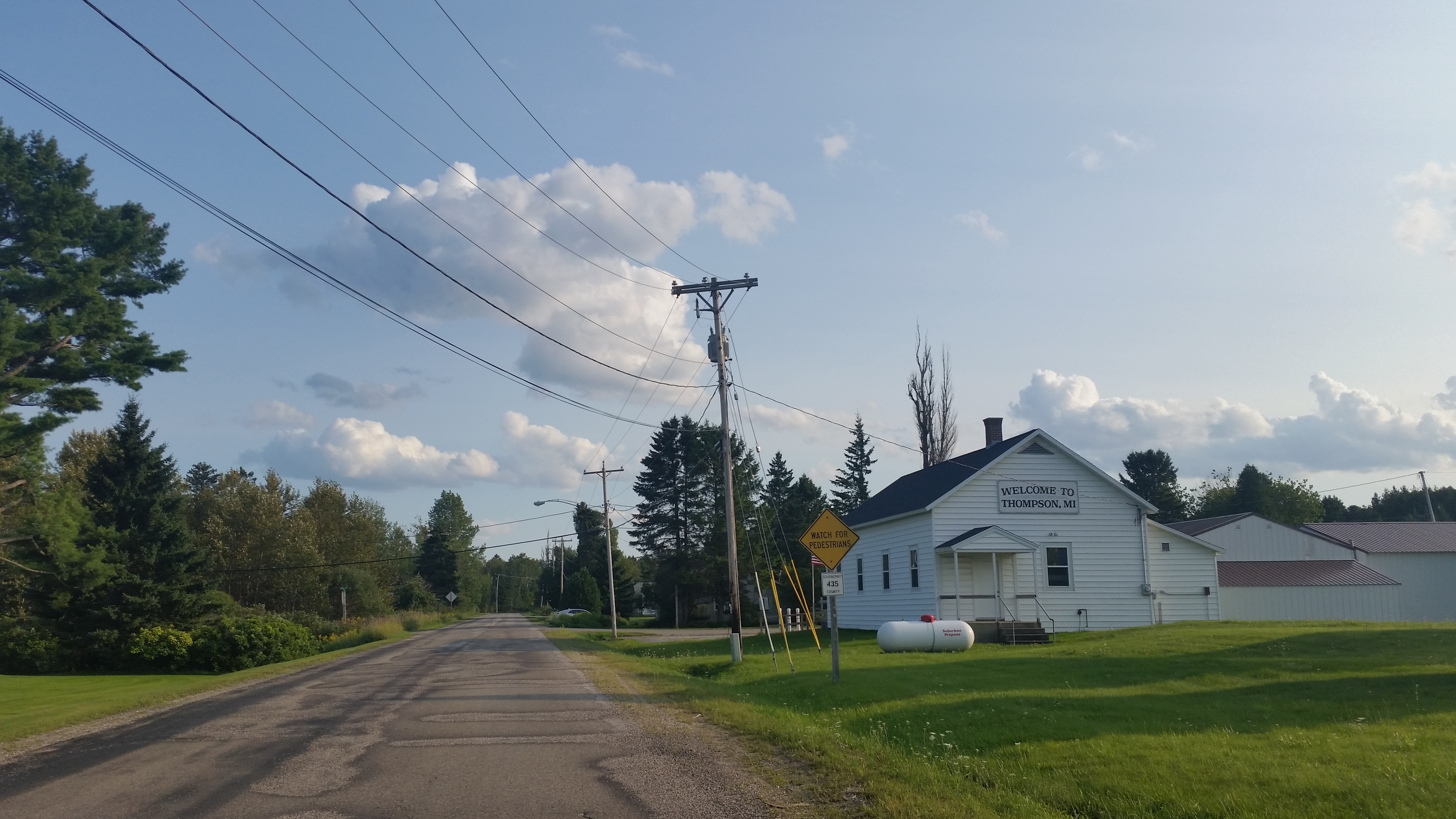
- Thompson Township Hall

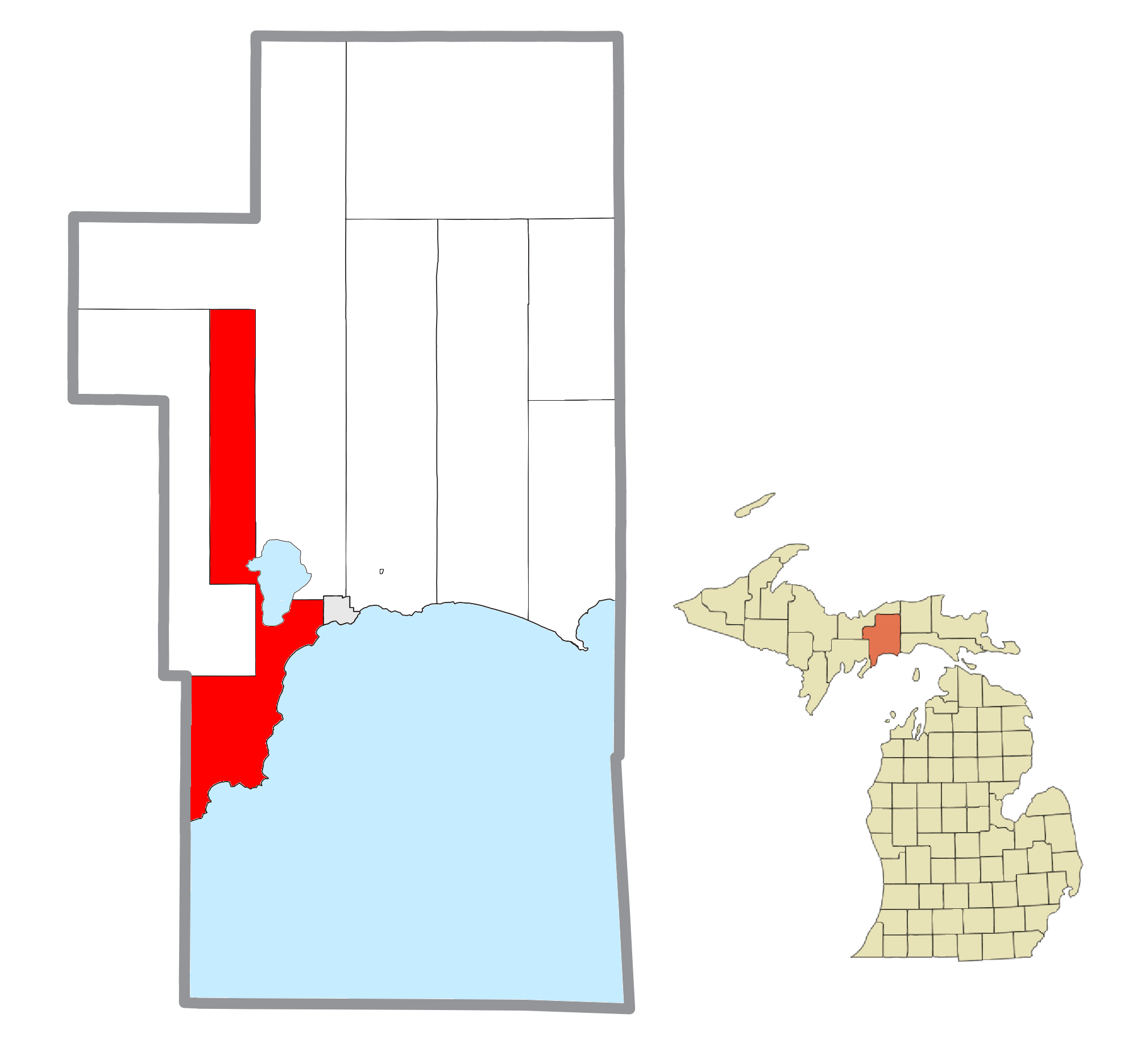
- Location within Schoolcraft County

- Location within the state of Michigan Thompson Township (the United States)
- Coordinates: 45°58′30″N 86°21′49″W
- Country: United States
- State: Michigan
- County: Schoolcraft
- Established: 1882

Government
  - Supervisor: Theresa Lund
  - Clerk: Tracy Smith

Area
  - Total: 118.33 sq mi (306.5 km^{2})
  - Land: 112.38 sq mi (291.1 km^{2})
  - Water: 5.95 sq mi (15.4 km^{2})
- Elevation: 682 ft (208 m)

Population (2020)
  - Total: 808
  - Density: 7.1/sq mi (2.7/km^{2})
- Time zone: UTC-5 (Eastern (EST))
  - Summer (DST): UTC-4 (EDT)
- ZIP code(s): 49835 (Garden); 49854 (Manistique)
- Area code: 906
- FIPS code: 26-79580
- GNIS feature ID: 1627161
- Website: Official website

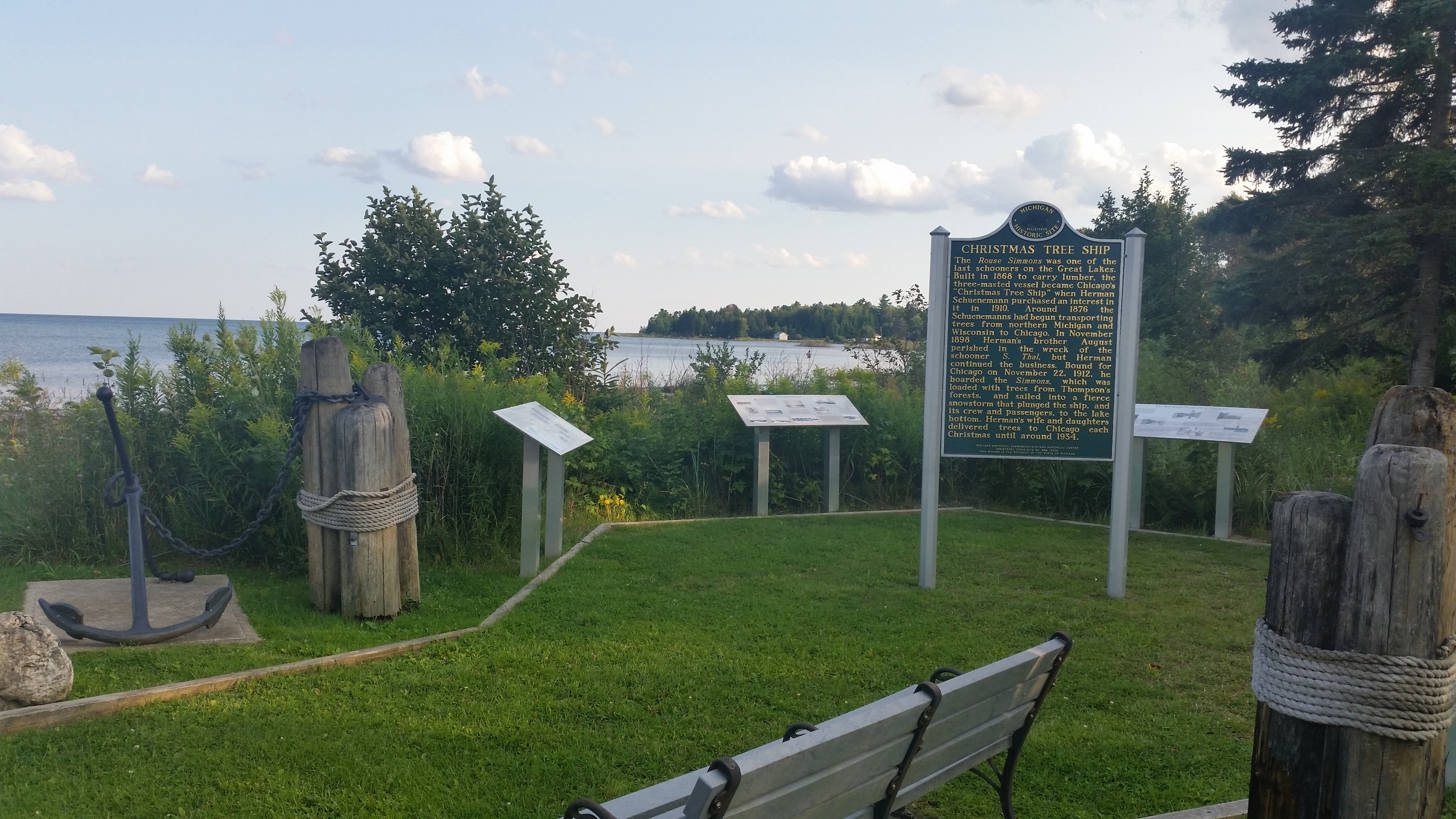
Michigan State Historic Site marker commemorating the Rouse Simmons (Christmas Tree Ship), which departed from Thompson Township and sank soon after with thousands of Christmas trees.

Thompson Township is a civil township of Schoolcraft County in the U.S. state of Michigan. As of 2020, its population was 808.

== History ==
After the timber boom of the late 19th century, Thompson Township's chief assets included second-growth trees such as balsam and aspen. The schooner Rouse Simmons, loaded with balsam Christmas trees, left Thompson Harbor for Chicago in November, 1912. The schooner sank with all hands off Two Rivers, Wisconsin, becoming one of the most famous shipwrecks in Lake Michigan history.

== Geography ==
According to the United States Census Bureau, the township has a total area of 118.33 square miles (306.47 km^{2}), of which 112.38 square miles (291.06 km^{2}) is land and 5.95 square miles (15.4 km^{2}) (5.02%) water.

Thompson Township has a shoreline on Indian Lake and Lake Michigan, as well as containing portions of the Hiawatha National Forest. Palms Book State Park and Indian Lake State Park are also located within the township. Major roadways include U.S. Route 2, M-94, and M-149.

== Demographics ==
As of the census of 2000, there were 671 people, 278 households, and 219 families living in the township. The population density was 5.9 per square mile (2.3/km^{2}). There were 608 housing units at an average density of 5.4 per square mile (2.1/km^{2}). The racial makeup of the township was 87.93% White, 0.30% African-American, 9.54% Native American, 0.15% Asian, 0.30% from other races, and 1.79% from two or more races. Hispanic or Latinos of any race were 0.30% of the population. Having a predominantly non-Hispanic white population in 2020, its population increased to 808.

In 2000, there were 278 households, out of which 26.3% had children under the age of 18 living with them, 71.9% were married couples living together, 3.6% had a female householder with no husband present, and 21.2% were non-families. 16.9% of all households were made up of individuals, and 8.3% had someone living alone who was 65 years of age or older. The average household size was 2.41 and the average family size was 2.68. In the township the population was spread out, with 19.8% under the age of 18, 5.7% from 18 to 24, 23.0% from 25 to 44, 34.1% from 45 to 64, and 17.4% who were 65 years of age or older. The median age was 46 years. For every 100 females, there were 100.3 males. For every 100 females age 18 and over, there were 103.0 males.

In 2000, the median income for a household in the township was $38,750, and the median income for a family was $41,731. Males had a median income of $41,250 versus $26,500 for females. The per capita income for the township was $24,045. About 7.5% of families and 8.8% of the population were below the poverty line, including 7.3% of those under the age of 18 and 3.8% of those 65 and older. The 2021 census estimates determined its median household income was $63,625.

== Transportation ==
Indian Trails provides daily intercity bus service via Thompson between St. Ignace and Ironwood, Michigan.
