= Manistique Township, Michigan =

- Civil township
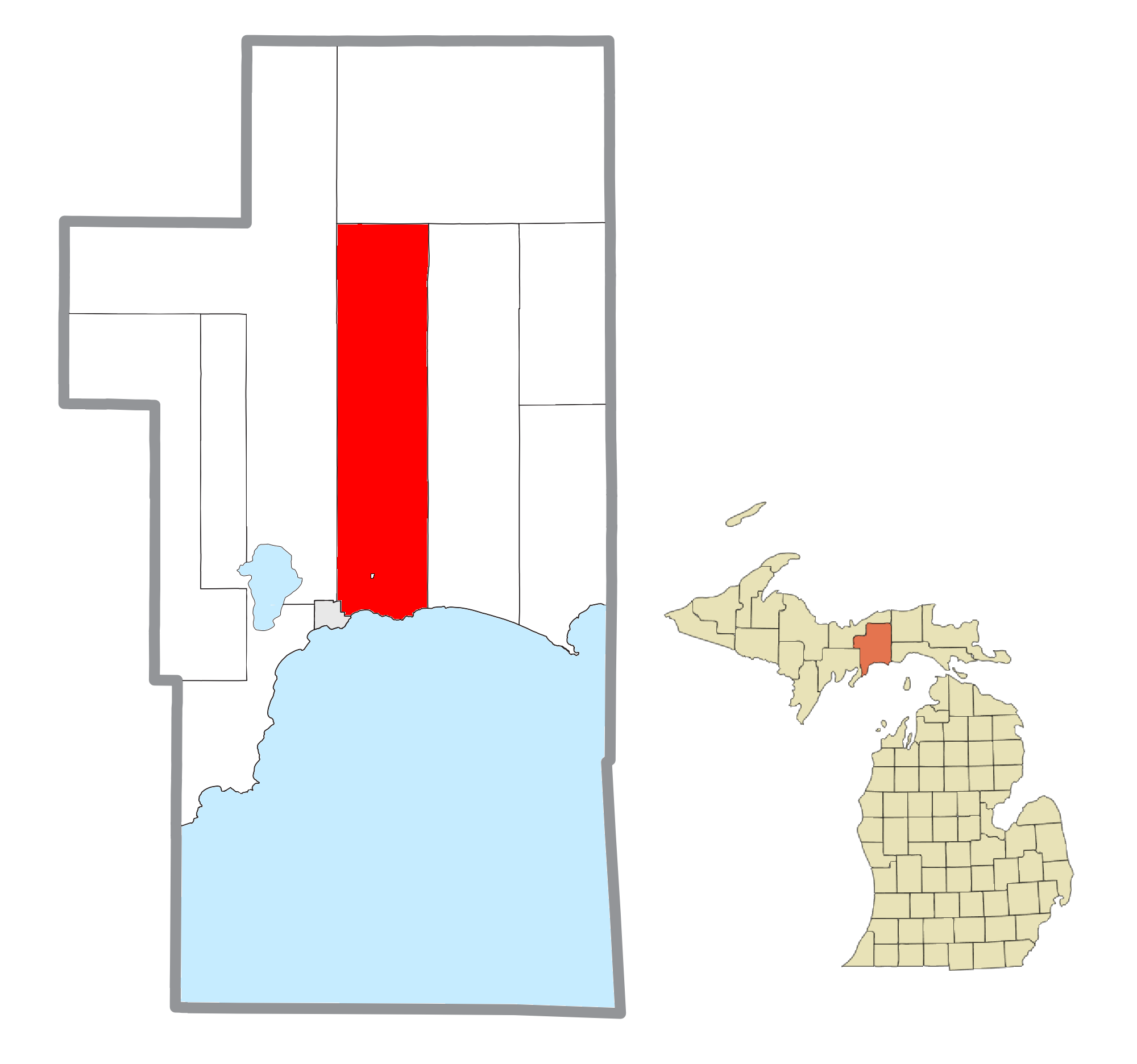
- Location within Schoolcraft County

- Location within the state of Michigan Manistique Township (the United States)
- Coordinates: 46°03′43″N 86°10′43″W
- Country: United States
- State: Michigan
- County: Schoolcraft

Government
  - Supervisor: Allen Hutchinson
  - Clerk: Joanne Fagan

Area
  - Total: 153.69 sq mi (398.1 km^{2})
  - Land: 149.34 sq mi (386.8 km^{2})
  - Water: 4.35 sq mi (11.3 km^{2})
- Elevation: 669 ft (204 m)

Population (2020)
  - Total: 1,045
  - Density: 7.3/sq mi (2.8/km^{2})
- Time zone: UTC-5 (Eastern (EST))
  - Summer (DST): UTC-4 (EDT)
- ZIP code(s): 49854 (Manistique)
- Area code: 906
- FIPS code: 26-50780
- GNIS feature ID: 1626669

Manistique Township is a civil township of Schoolcraft County in the U.S. state of Michigan. The population was 1,045 in 2020. The township is adjacent to the city of Manistique, but the two are administered autonomously.

== Geography ==
According to the United States Census Bureau, the township has a total area of 153.69 square miles (398.06 km^{2}), of which 149.34 square miles (386.79 km^{2}) is land and 4.35 square miles (11.27 km^{2}) (2.83%) is water.

== Demographics ==
According to the census of 2000, there were 1,053 people, 411 households, and 309 families residing in the township. The population density was 7.0 inhabitants per square mile (2.7/km^{2}). There were 606 housing units at an average density of 4.0 per square mile (1.5/km^{2}). The racial makeup of the township was 83.00% White, 0.09% African American, 11.59% Native American, 1.04% from other races, and 4.27% from two or more races. Hispanic or Latinos of any race were 0.57% of the population. By the publication of the 2020 census, its population was 1,045.

In 2000, there were 411 households, out of which 33.8% had children under the age of 18 living with them, 62.5% were married couples living together, 7.1% had a female householder with no husband present, and 24.6% were non-families. 20.0% of all households were made up of individuals, and 8.0% had someone living alone who was 65 years of age or older. The average household size was 2.56 and the average family size was 2.91. In the township the population was spread out, with 26.3% under the age of 18, 6.2% from 18 to 24, 27.3% from 25 to 44, 28.0% from 45 to 64, and 12.3% who were 65 years of age or older. The median age was 39 years. For every 100 females, there were 105.7 males. For every 100 females age 18 and over, there were 103.7 males.

In 2000, the median income for a household in the township was $40,000, and the median income for a family was $46,667. Males had a median income of $43,000 versus $23,472 for females. The per capita income for the township was $18,127. About 9.6% of families and 12.5% of the population were below the poverty line, including 20.4% of those under age 18 and 2.6% of those age 65 or over. In 2020, its median household income was $49,583.
