= Palms Book State Park =

Park in Michigan, USA

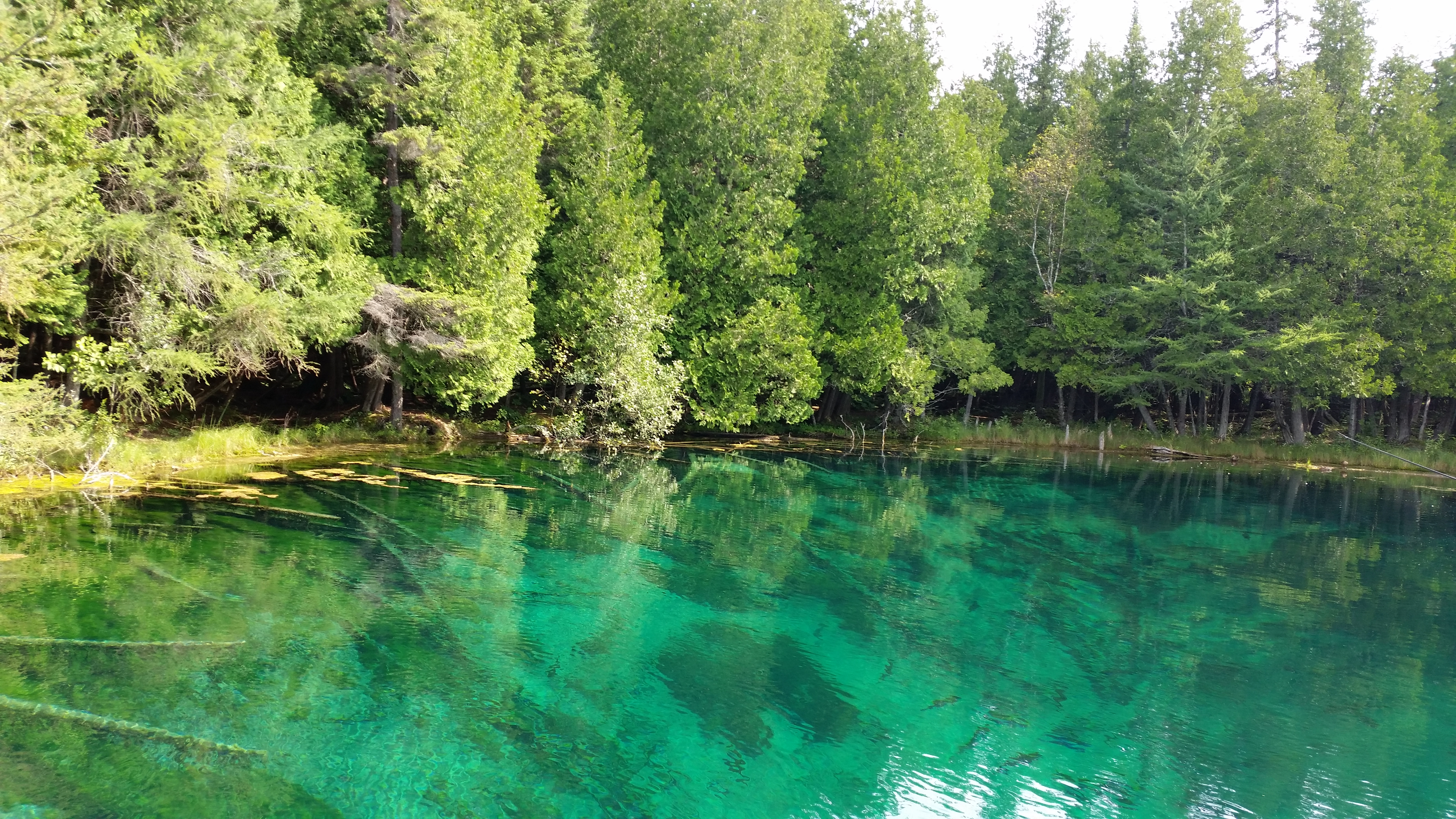
- Kitch-iti-kipi within Palms Book State Park

- Location within Michigan Location within the United States
- Location: Upper Peninsula, Schoolcraft County, Michigan, United States
- Nearest city: Manistique, Michigan
- Coordinates: 46°00′15″N 86°22′54″W
- Area: 388 acres (157 ha)
- Elevation: 620 feet (190 m)
- Established: 1929
- Administrator: Michigan Department of Natural Resources
- Designation: Michigan state park
- Named for: Palms and Book Land Company
- Website: Official website

Palms Book State Park is a publicly owned nature preserve encompassing 388 acres (157 ha) in Thompson Township, Schoolcraft County, in the eastern Upper Peninsula of Michigan. The state park is noted for Kitch-iti-kipi, the "Big Spring".

== History ==
The Palms and Book Land Company sold the property to the state in 1926, insisting on the name and a ban on camping. John I. Bellaire arranged for the sale of a 90-acre (36 ha) parcel to the state for $10. The arrangement called for the establishment of a park that would be named after the land company. During the 1930s, workers with the Civilian Conservation Corps assisted in making park improvements that included construction of an observation raft, dock, and ranger's quarters.

== Spring ==
The Kitch-iti-kipi spring is a pool of clear water 400 feet (120 m) across in its largest dimension, and up to 40 feet (12 m) deep. The spring water can be seen from above as it wells upward through the pond's bottom of bedrock limestone and sand, creating a continual pattern of random eddies and cross-currents in the depths of the pond. To the Anishinaabe people that were the original inhabitants of much of the Upper Peninsula, this site was a place of mystery and wonder. The water is 45 °F (7 °C) in both winter and summer.

Since the days of the Civilian Conservation Corps in the 1930s, the state has operated a manually propelled observation raft. The raft, which is fixed by cables, carries visitors onto the spring pond, allowing the depths of the pond to be seen from above. The pond is stocked with trout.

== Indian Lake ==
The spring discharges more than 10,000 gallons (40,000 liters) of water per minute, which pass from the pond into nearby Indian Lake. Palms Book State Park protects approximately 1 mile (1.6 km) of lake frontage.
