= Cooks, Michigan =

- Unincorporated community
- Location within the state of Michigan Cooks (the United States)
- Coordinates: 45°55′04″N 86°28′35″W
- Country: United States
- State: Michigan
- County: Schoolcraft
- Township: Inwood
- Elevation: 699 ft (213 m)
- Time zone: UTC-5 (Eastern (EST))
  - Summer (DST): UTC-4 (EDT)
- ZIP code(s): 49817
- Area code: 906
- GNIS feature ID: 1619567

Cooks is an unincorporated community in Schoolcraft County, Michigan, United States. Cooks is located in Inwood Township along the Canadian National Railway north of U.S. Route 2, 11.5 miles (18.5 km) west-southwest of Manistique. Cooks has a post office with ZIP code 49817.

== History ==
Cooks was founded in 1883 when John C. Cook built a sawmill at the community. The community was originally named Cook's Mills before being shortened to Cooks. A post office opened in the community on June 28, 1888; Norman McDonald was the first postmaster. The community had a station on the Minneapolis, St. Paul and Sault Ste. Marie Railroad under the name Cooks Mill.
