= Ekdahl–Goudreau Site =

Archaeological site in Michigan, United States

- U.S. National Register of Historic Places
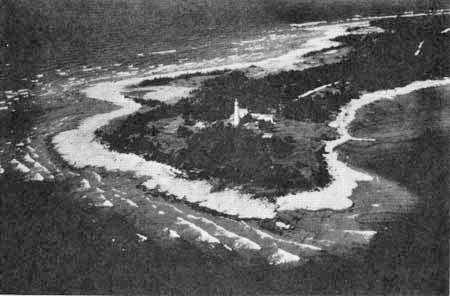
- Seul Choix Point

- Location within Michigan Location within the United States
- Location: Address Restricted (Seul Choix Point, Schoolcraft County, Michigan)
- Coordinates: 45°55′0″N 85°55′0″W
- Area: 2 acres (0.81 ha)
- NRHP reference No.: 78003099
- Added to NRHP: November 16, 1978

The Ekdahl–Goudreau Site is an archaeological site located just west of Seul Choix Point in Schoolcraft County, Michigan. It is also known as the Ekdahl–Goodreau Site or the Seul Choix Site. It was listed on the National Register of Historic Places in 1978.

== History ==
The Ekdahl–Goudreau Site was discovered by George I. Quimby and James R. Getz in 1962. In 1965, Earl J. Prahl returned to the site to perform further excavation. Pottery artifacts date the site to the Late Woodland period.

== Description ==
The Ekdahl–Goudreau Site is located above a small natural harbor among sloping beds of limestone along the shore of Lake Michigan. The harbor is about 200 feet long and slightly less in width, with a sloping sand beach on the landward side. The site is located a few hundred feet back from the harbor and 20 feet above the waterline, on a level sandy area.

Debris, consisting of pottery sherds, flints, and fragments of copper artifacts, were spread over an extensive area, likely by the wind.
