= Seney, Michigan =

- Unincorporated community
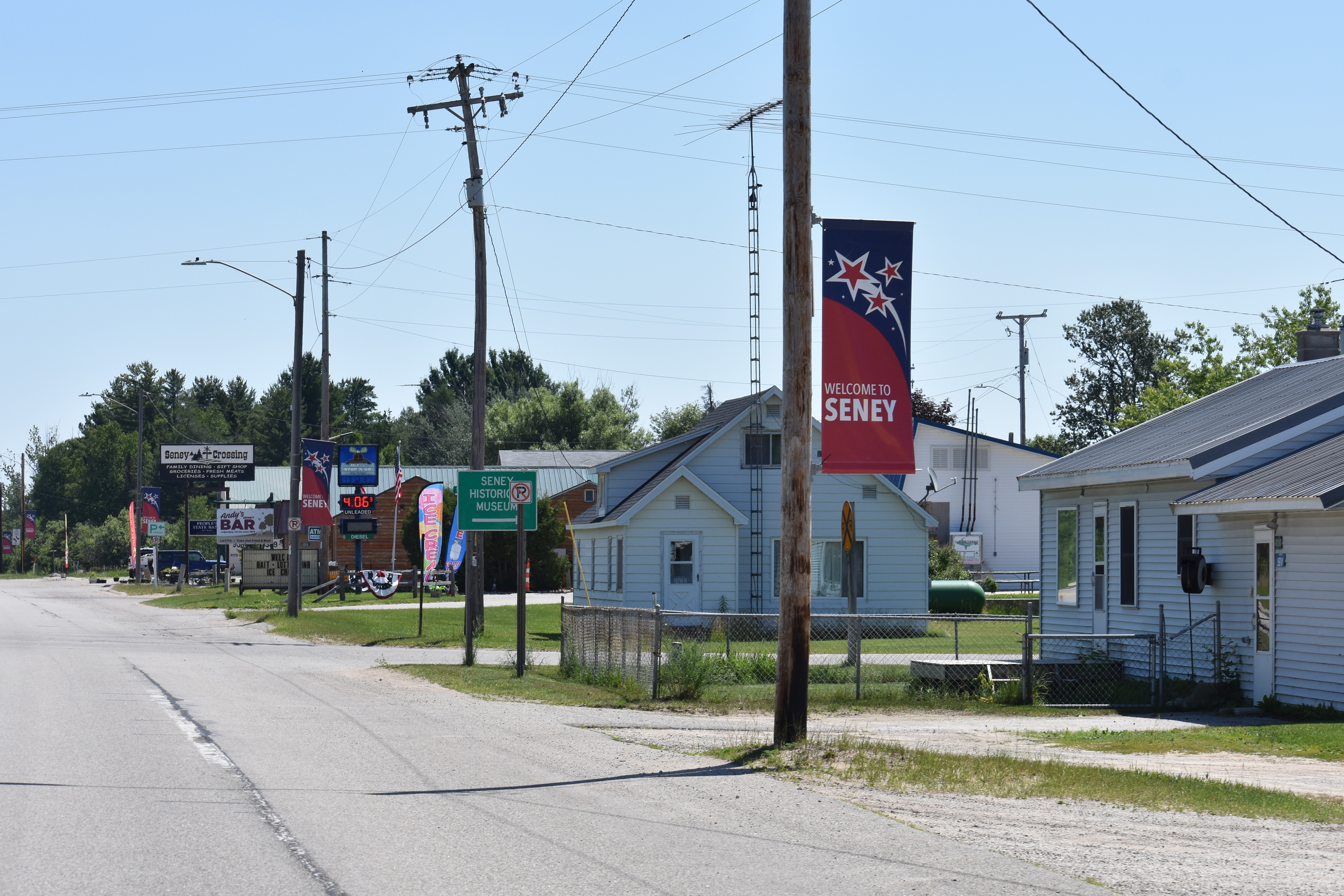
- Seney in July 2026

- Location within the state of Michigan
- Coordinates: 46°20′44″N 85°56′44″W
- Country: United States
- State: Michigan
- County: Schoolcraft
- Township: Seney
- Elevation: 735 ft (224 m)
- Time zone: UTC-5 (Eastern (EST))
  - Summer (DST): UTC-4 (EDT)
- ZIP code(s): 49883
- Area code: 906
- GNIS feature ID: 1619567

Seney (/siːni/ SEE-nee) is an unincorporated community in Schoolcraft County in the Upper Peninsula of Michigan, United States. State trunkline highway M-28 runs directly through Seney.

The historic community of Seney began as a railroad stop in 1881. Soon after, logging companies moved into the area to lumber the white pine forests in the surrounding region. Seney quickly grew to over 3,000 people. During this time, the town gained a reputation for being rowdy and dangerous due to its booming economy and numerous saloons. By the end of the nineteenth century, pine forests in the surrounding region were depleted, due to the logging and numerous fires, and the lumber companies left, shrinking the town considerably. It currently has less than 200 people.

Today, the town is noted as a gateway to the region's recreation and tourism. It is located on the outskirts of the Seney National Wildlife Refuge, administered by the U.S. Fish and Wildlife Service, and it is a throughway to the eastern end of the Pictured Rocks National Lakeshore. Seney is also the terminus of the hiking trail known as the Fox River Pathway (which connects with the North Country Trail).

Ernest Hemingway's short story "Big Two-Hearted River," based on a visit he made in his youth, features the town; he also mentioned it in his 1923 poem "Along with Youth." Leon Czolgosz, who assassinated President William McKinley, lived in Seney during the boom years when he worked on the local railroad.

Seney is located on the eastern end of the Seney Stretch. A "Boot Hill" cemetery is located outside of town. The community is located in Seney Township, Michigan.

Incredible Seney: The First Complete Story of Michigan's Fabulous Lumber Town (1953) is a nonfiction book about Seney's historic boom years written by Lewis Reimann.
