= Indian Lake (Schoolcraft County, Michigan) =

Lake in the state of Michigan, United States

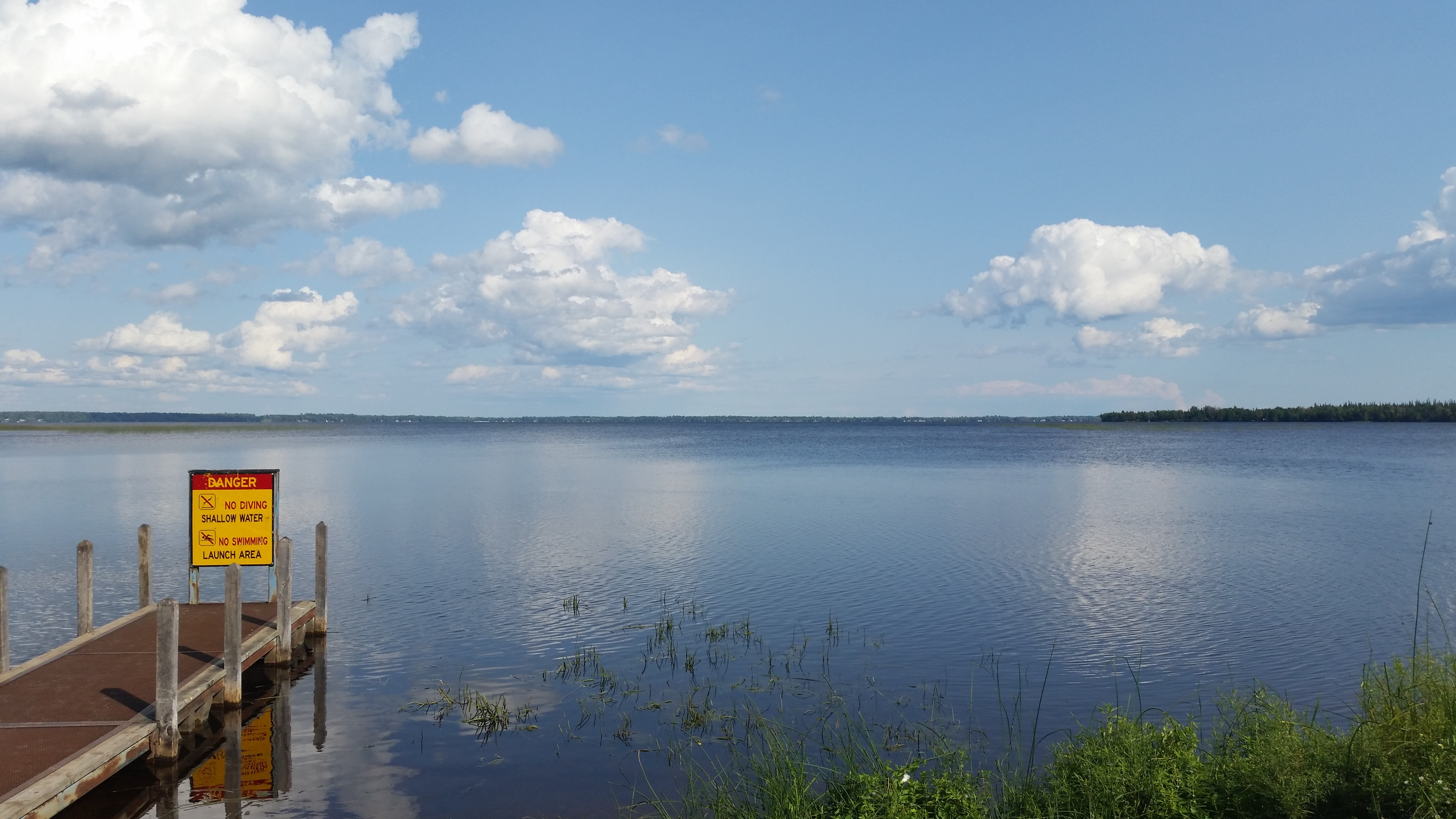
- View from Palms Book State Park

- Location within the state of Michigan Indian Lake (the United States)
- Location: Schoolcraft County, Michigan
- Coordinates: 45°59′20″N 86°19′56″W
- Type: Lake
- Basin countries: United States
- Max. length: 6 mi (9.7 km)
- Max. width: 3 mi (4.8 km)
- Surface area: 8,400 acres (3,400 ha)
- Surface elevation: 610 ft (190 m)

Indian Lake is a lake in Schoolcraft County, Michigan, United States. Measuring 6 miles (9.7 km) long and 3 miles (4.8 km) wide, and covering 8,400 acres (3,400 ha), it is the fourth largest inland lake on Michigan's Upper Peninsula. Indian Lake is bordered by the two units of Indian Lake State Park on its south and west shores and by Palms Book State Park on its northwest shore.

== See also ==
- List of lakes in Michigan
