= Hiawatha Township, Michigan =

- Civil township
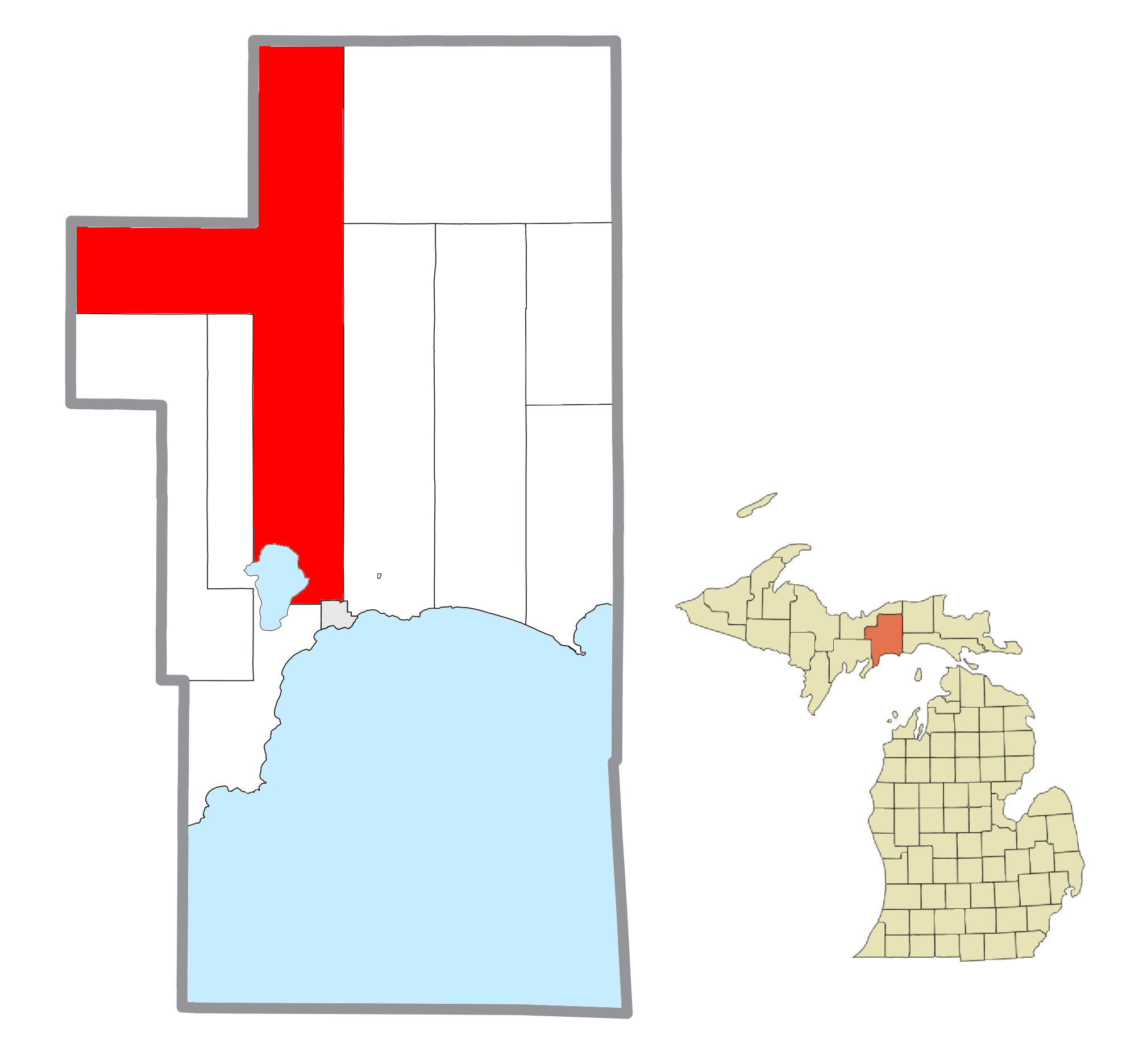
- Location within Schoolcraft County

- Location within the state of Michigan Hiawatha Township (the United States)
- Coordinates: 46°13′55″N 86°19′32″W
- Country: United States
- State: Michigan
- County: Schoolcraft

Government
  - Supervisor: Gilbert Baker
  - Clerk: Kelly Matchinski

Area
  - Total: 290.87 sq mi (753.3 km^{2})
  - Land: 277.43 sq mi (718.5 km^{2})
  - Water: 13.44 sq mi (34.8 km^{2})
- Elevation: 728 ft (222 m)

Population (2020)
  - Total: 1,305
  - Density: 4.7/sq mi (1.8/km^{2})
- Time zone: UTC-5 (Eastern (EST))
  - Summer (DST): UTC-4 (EDT)
- ZIP code(s): 49854 (Manistique); 49862 (Munising); 49884 (Shingleton); 49895 (Wetmore)
- Area code: 906
- FIPS code: 26-37940
- GNIS feature ID: 1626467

Hiawatha Township is a civil township of Schoolcraft County in the U.S. state of Michigan. The population was 1,305 in 2020. With a total land area of 277.43 square miles (718.54 km^{2}), Hiawatha Township is the third largest municipality in the state after McMillan Township and Marenisco Township.

== Geography ==
According to the United States Census Bureau, the township has a total area of 290.87 square miles (753.35 km^{2}), of which 277.43 square miles (718.54 km^{2}) is land and 13.44 square miles (34.81 km^{2}) (4.62%) is water.

== Demographics ==
At the census of 2000, there were 1,328 people, 563 households, and 404 families residing in the township. The population density was 4.8 inhabitants per square mile (1.9/km^{2}). There were 935 housing units at an average density of 3.4 per square mile (1.3/km^{2}). The racial makeup of the township was 93.98% White, 0.08% African American, 3.92% Native American, 0.38% Asian, 0.08% from other races, and 1.58% from two or more races. Hispanic or Latinos of any race were 0.30% of the population. By the 2020 census, its population declined to 1,305.

In 2000, the median income for a household in the township was $40,156, and the median income for a family was $46,406. Males had a median income of $40,294 versus $24,853 for females. The per capita income for the township was $20,385. About 6.0% of families and 6.0% of the population were below the poverty line, including 6.1% of those under age 18 and 4.3% of those age 65 or over. The 2021 census estimates determined its median household income was $69,563.
