= Inwood Township, Michigan =

- Civil township
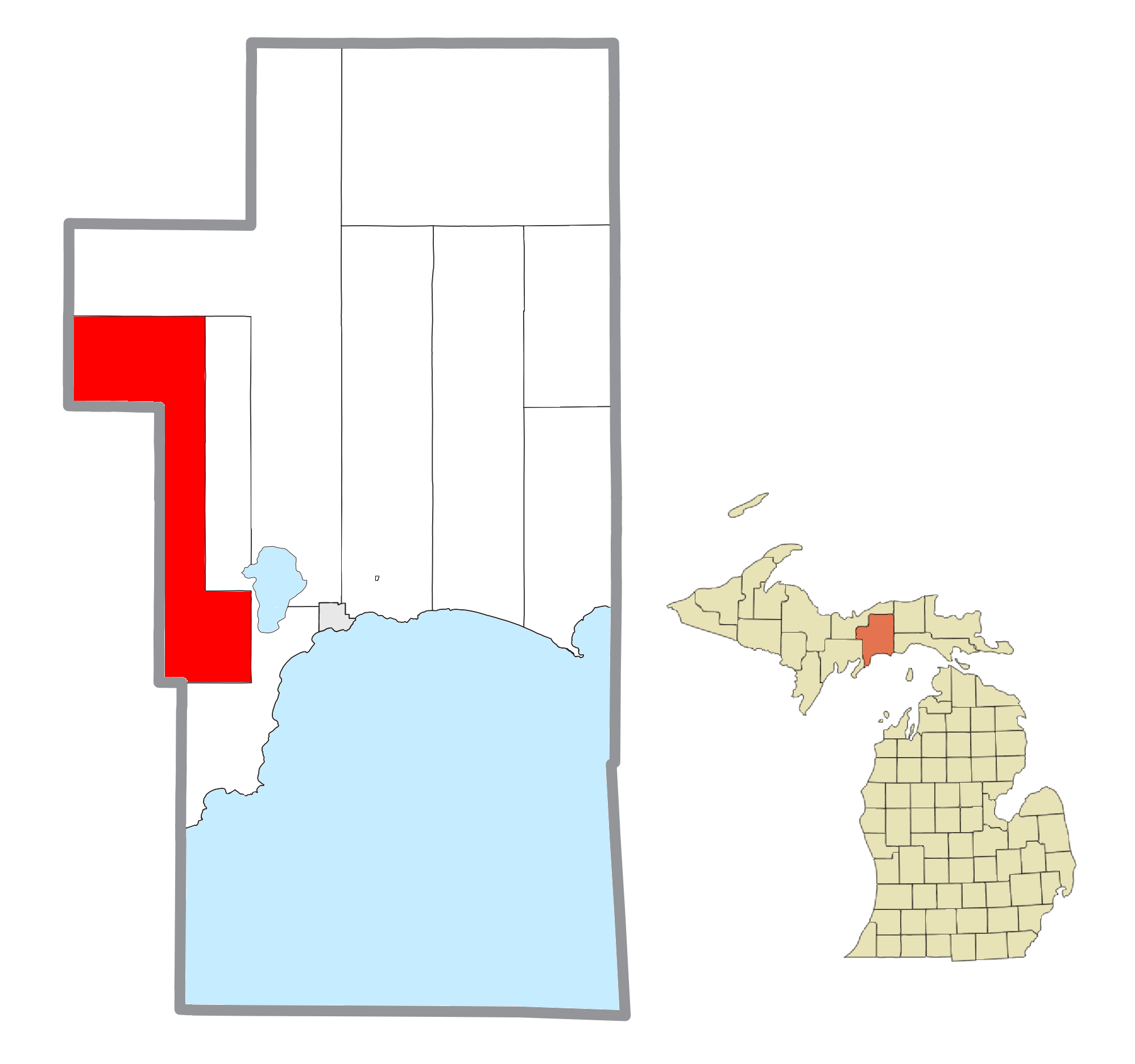
- Location within Schoolcraft County

- Location within the state of Michigan Inwood Township (the United States)
- Coordinates: 46°06′31″N 86°29′19″W
- Country: United States
- State: Michigan
- County: Schoolcraft
- Organized: 1890

Government
  - Supervisor: Kelly Silkworth
  - Clerk: Robin Double

Area
  - Total: 126.81 sq mi (328.4 km^{2})
  - Land: 120.22 sq mi (311.4 km^{2})
  - Water: 6.59 sq mi (17.1 km^{2})
- Elevation: 679 ft (207 m)

Population (2020)
  - Total: 654
  - Density: 6.1/sq mi (2.4/km^{2})
- Time zone: UTC-5 (Eastern (EST))
  - Summer (DST): UTC-4 (EDT)
- ZIP code(s): 49817 (Cooks); 49854 (Manistique); 49895 (Wetmore)
- Area code: 906
- FIPS code: 26-40840
- GNIS feature ID: 1626520
- Website: Official website

Inwood Township is a civil township of Schoolcraft County in the U.S. state of Michigan. The population was 654 in 2020.

== Geography ==
According to the United States Census Bureau, the township has a total area of 126.81 square miles (328.44 km^{2}), of which 120.22 square miles (311.37 km^{2}) is land and 6.59 square miles (17.07 km^{2}) (5.20%) is water.

=== Communities ===
- Steuben is a summer resort community within Inwood Township. The community was founded by the Chicago Lumbering Company and named by an executive from Steuben County, New York. The county was named for Baron Friedrich Wilhelm von Steuben, the inspector general of Washington's army from 1777 through 1784. The community was a stop on the Manistique and Lake Superior Railroad, and its post office opened in 1903.

== Demographics ==
At the census of 2000, there were 722 people, 293 households, and 234 families residing in the township. The population density was 6.0 inhabitants per square mile (2.3/km^{2}). There were 620 housing units at an average density of 5.2 per square mile (2.0/km^{2}). The racial makeup of the township was 90.17% White, 5.26% Native American, 0.55% Asian, 0.55% from other races, and 3.46% from two or more races. Hispanic or Latino of any race were 1.39% of the population. By the 2020 census, its population declined to 654.

In 2000, there were 293 households, out of which 26.6% had children under the age of 18 living with them, 72.0% were married couples living together, 4.8% had a female householder with no husband present, and 19.8% were non-families. 18.8% of all households were made up of individuals, and 9.2% had someone living alone who was 65 years of age or older. The average household size was 2.46 and the average family size was 2.80. In the township the population was spread out, with 22.9% under the age of 18, 3.9% from 18 to 24, 25.2% from 25 to 44, 28.1% from 45 to 64, and 19.9% who were 65 years of age or older. The median age was 44 years. For every 100 females, there were 104.5 males. For every 100 females age 18 and over, there were 99.6 males.

In 2000, the median income for a household in the township was $32,500, and the median income for a family was $35,147. Males had a median income of $33,125 versus $21,750 for females. The per capita income for the township was $15,386. About 8.0% of families and 11.8% of the population were below the poverty line, including 22.8% of those under age 18 and 2.9% of those age 65 or over. In 2021, the American Community Survey estimated its median household income was $56,188.
