= Indian Lake State Park (Michigan) =

Park in Michigan, USA

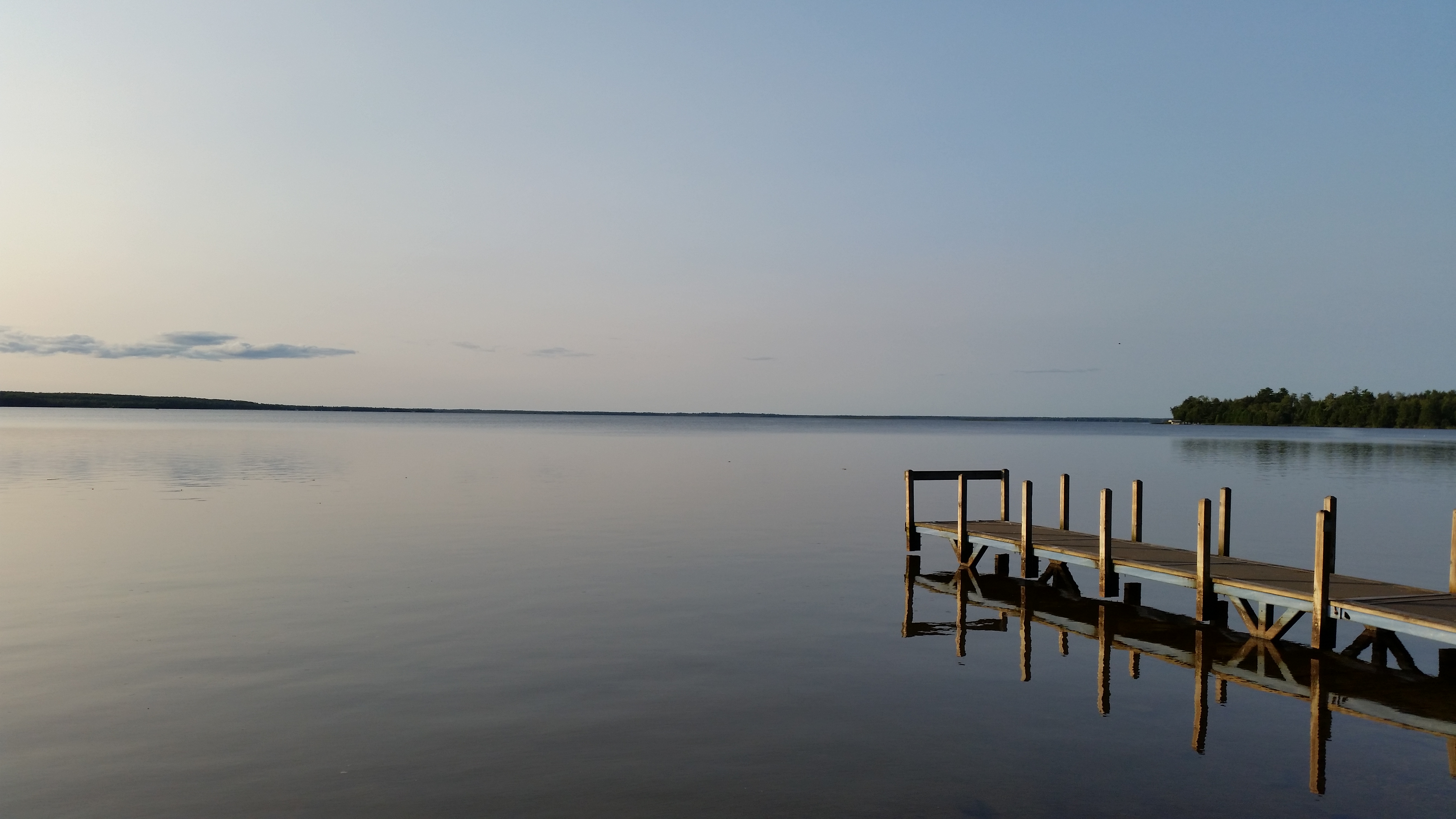
- View of Indian Lake from the boat launch

- Location within Michigan Location within the United States
- Location: Upper Peninsula, Schoolcraft County, Michigan, United States
- Nearest city: Manistique, Michigan
- Coordinates: 45°56′38″N 86°19′54″W
- Area: 567 acres (229 ha)
- Elevation: 610 feet (190 m)
- Established: 1932
- Administrator: Michigan Department of Natural Resources
- Designation: Michigan state park
- Website: Official website

Indian Lake State Park is a public recreation area covering 567 acres (229 ha) in Schoolcraft County on the Upper Peninsula of Michigan. The state park is made up of two units that are three miles apart, one on the south shore of Indian Lake, one on the west shore.

== History ==
Acquisition of the south shore site occurred in 1932; acquisition of the west shore site occurred in 1939, with development beginning there in 1965. Members of the Civilian Conservation Corps and WPA developed the south shore site in the 1930s, building a log bath house and a 40-by-80-foot limestone picnic shelter that is still in use.

== Activities and amenities ==
The park offers swimming, boating, hiking, picnicking, and camping.
