= Schoolcraft County, Michigan =

County in Michigan, United States

- County
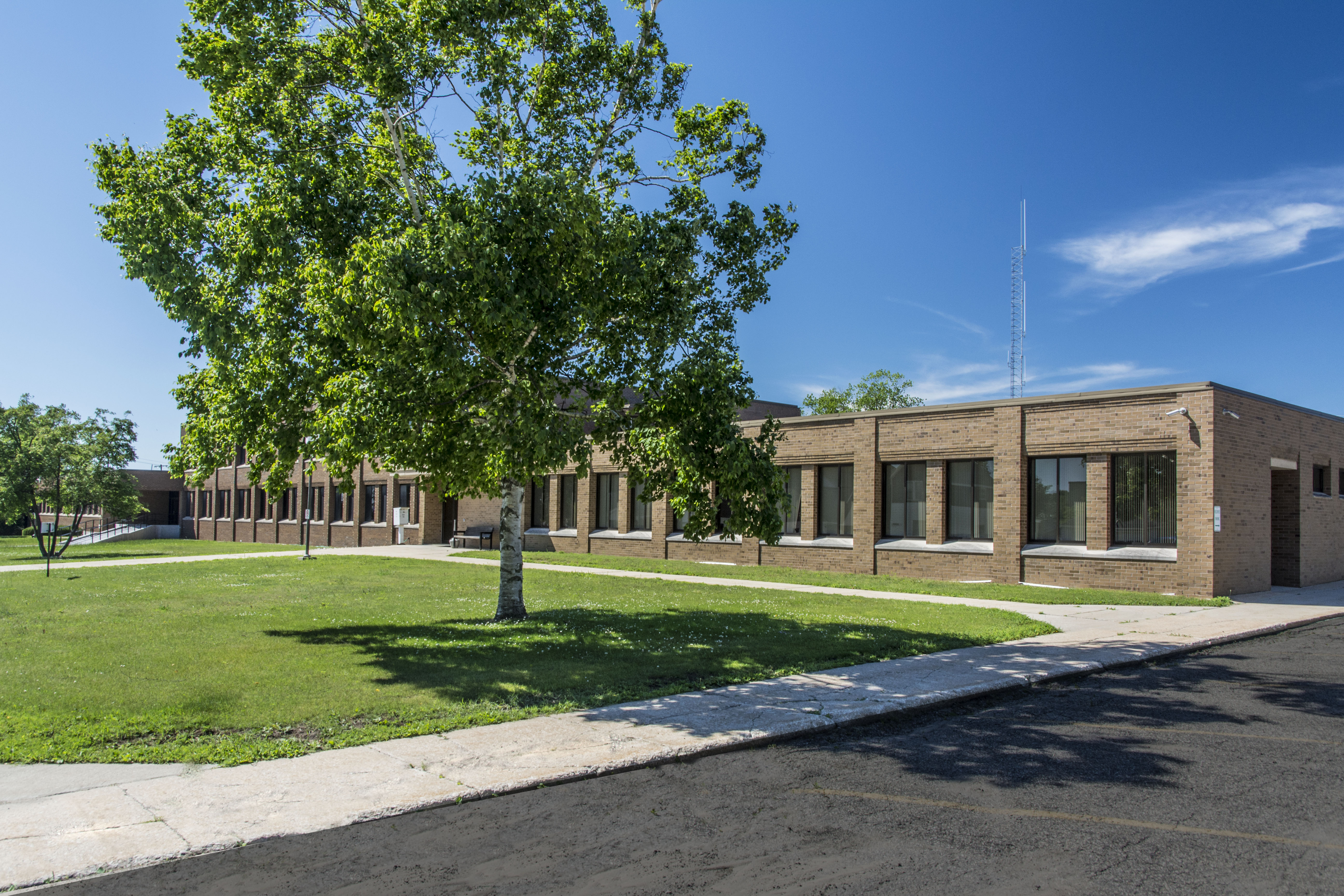
- Schoolcraft County Courthouse

- Location within the U.S. state of Michigan
- Coordinates: 46°01′N 86°11′W
- Country: United States
- State: Michigan
- Founded: March 9, 1843 (created); 1876 (organized)
- Named for: Henry Schoolcraft
- Seat: Manistique
- Largest city: Manistique

Area
  - Total: 1,884 sq mi (4,880 km^{2})
  - Land: 1,171 sq mi (3,030 km^{2})
  - Water: 713 sq mi (1,850 km^{2}) 38%

Population (2020)
  - Total: 8,047
  - Estimate (2025): 8,187 ▲
  - Density: 7.2/sq mi (2.8/km^{2})
- Time zone: UTC−5 (Eastern)
  - Summer (DST): UTC−4 (EDT)
- Congressional district: 1st
- Website: schoolcraftcounty.net

Schoolcraft County (/ˈskuːlkræft/ SKOOL-kraft) is a county located in the Upper Peninsula of the U.S. state of Michigan. As of the 2020 census, the population was 8,047, making it Michigan's fourth-least populous county. The county seat is Manistique, which lies along the northern shore of Lake Michigan. The county is named in honor of Henry Schoolcraft, who explored the area with the expedition of Lewis Cass. The county was founded in 1843 and organized in 1876. The county is largely rural and forested, with much of its western portion within Hiawatha National Forest.

== Geography ==
According to the U.S. Census Bureau, the county has a total area of 1,884 square miles (4,880 km^{2}), of which 1,171 square miles (3,030 km^{2}) is land and 713 square miles (1,850 km^{2}) (38%) is water.

=== Major highways ===
- US 2 – runs east and NE across south edge of county. Passes Cooks, Manistique, Gulliver, Parkington, Blaney Park.
- M-28 – runs east–west across upper middle part of county. Passes Seney.
- M-77 – enters county near NE corner. Runs south past Seney to intersection with US2 near Blaney Park.
- M-94 – enters county near NW corner. Runs south and SE to intersection with US2 near Manistique.
- M-149 – enters near SW corner of county. Runs east to intersection with US2 at Manistique.
- H-13 / FFH 13 – runs north from Cooks through Hiawatha National Forest.

=== Airport ===
- Schoolcraft County Airport (IATA: ISQ, ICAO: ISQ, FAA LID: KISQ) - 3 miles NE of Manistique. County-owned public-use (general aviation). Two paved runways.

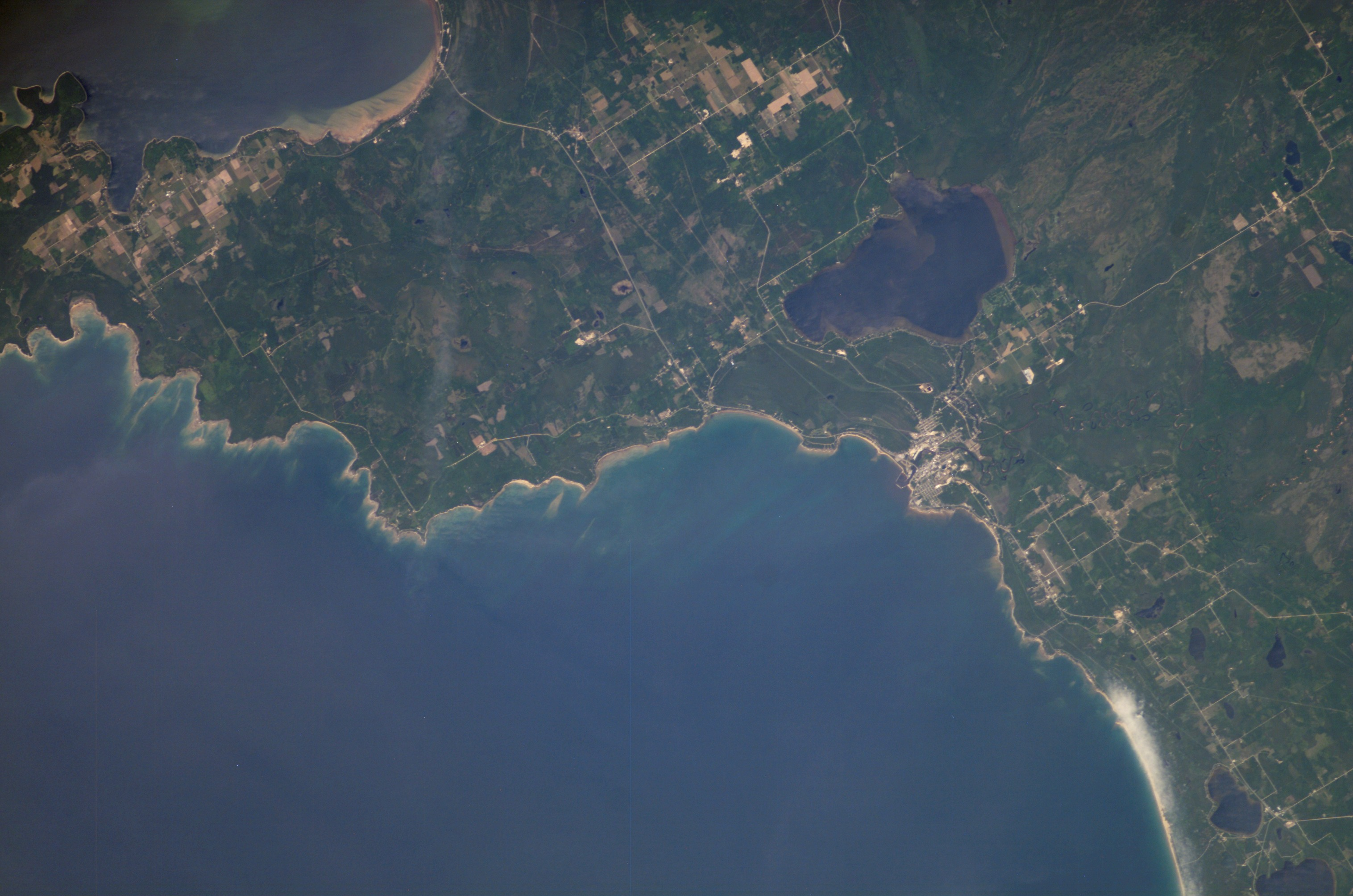
Border of Schoolcraft and Delta counties, taken from the ISS.

=== Adjacent counties ===
By land

- Delta County (west)
- Alger County (northwest)
- Luce County (northeast)
- Mackinac County (southeast)

By water

- Charlevoix County (southeast)
- Leelanau County (south)

=== National protected areas ===
- Hiawatha National Forest (part)
- Seney National Wildlife Refuge

== Communities ==
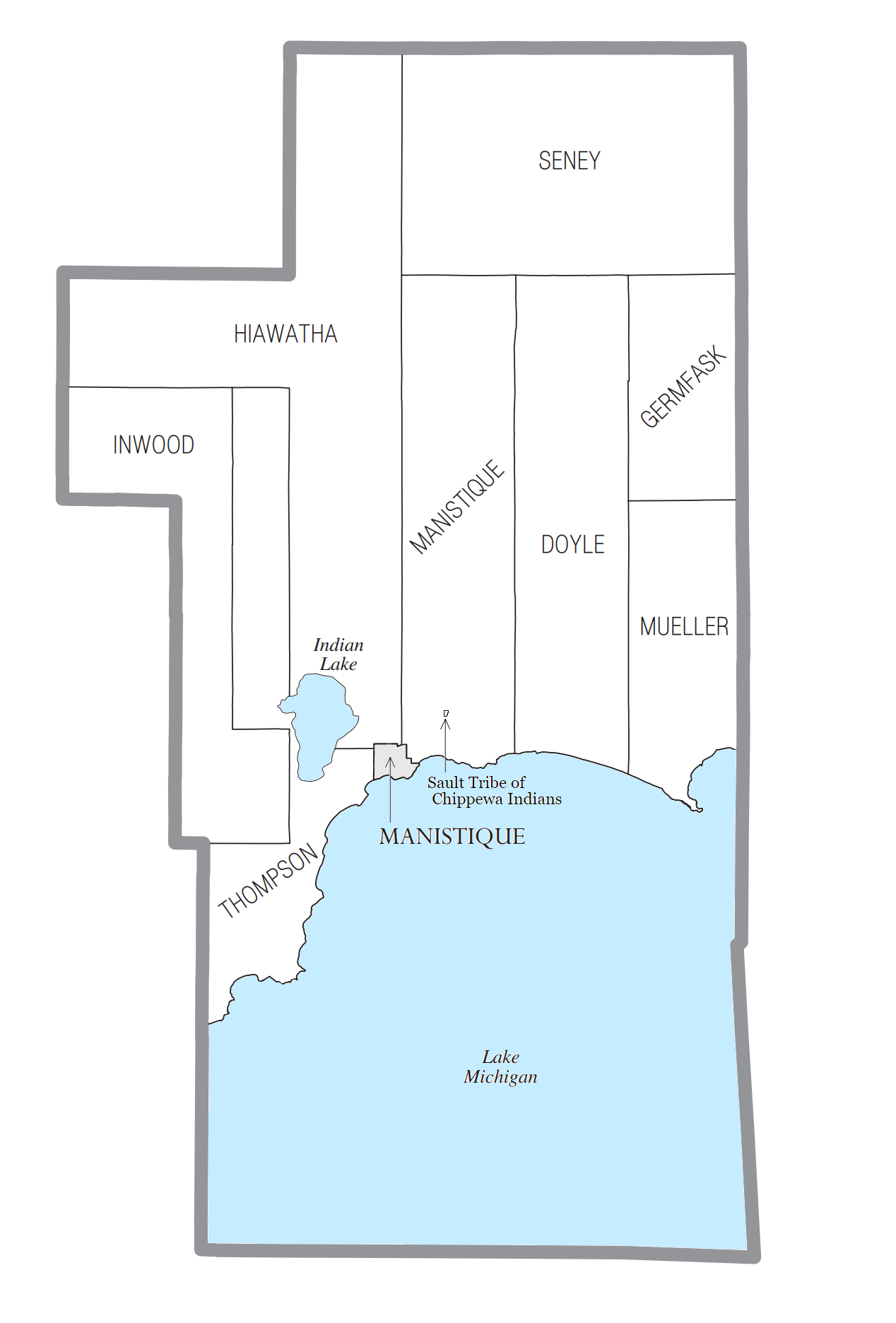
U.S. Census data map showing local municipal boundaries within Schoolcraft County. Shaded areas represent incorporated cities.

=== City ===
- Manistique (county seat)

=== Civil townships ===
- Doyle Township
- Germfask Township
- Hiawatha Township
- Inwood Township
- Manistique Township
- Mueller Township
- Seney Township
- Thompson Township

=== Unincorporated communities ===
- Blaney
- Cooks
- Germfask
- Gulliver
- Seney
- Steuben
- Thompson

=== Indian reservation ===
- The Sault Tribe of Chippewa Indians occupies a very small plot of land in southern Manistique Township.

=== Former settlements ===
- Little Harbor, Michigan
- Calspar, Michigan

== Demographics ==
Historical population
Census	Pop.	Note	%±
1880	1,575		—
1890	5,818		269.4%
1900	7,889		35.6%
1910	8,681		10.0%
1920	9,977		14.9%
1930	8,451		−15.3%
1940	9,524		12.7%
1950	9,148		−3.9%
1960	8,953		−2.1%
1970	8,226		−8.1%
1980	8,575		4.2%
1990	8,302		−3.2%
2000	8,903		7.2%
2010	8,485		−4.7%
2020	8,047		−5.2%
2025 (est.)	8,187	▲	1.7%
US Decennial Census; 1790-1960 1900-1990; 1990-2000 2010-2018

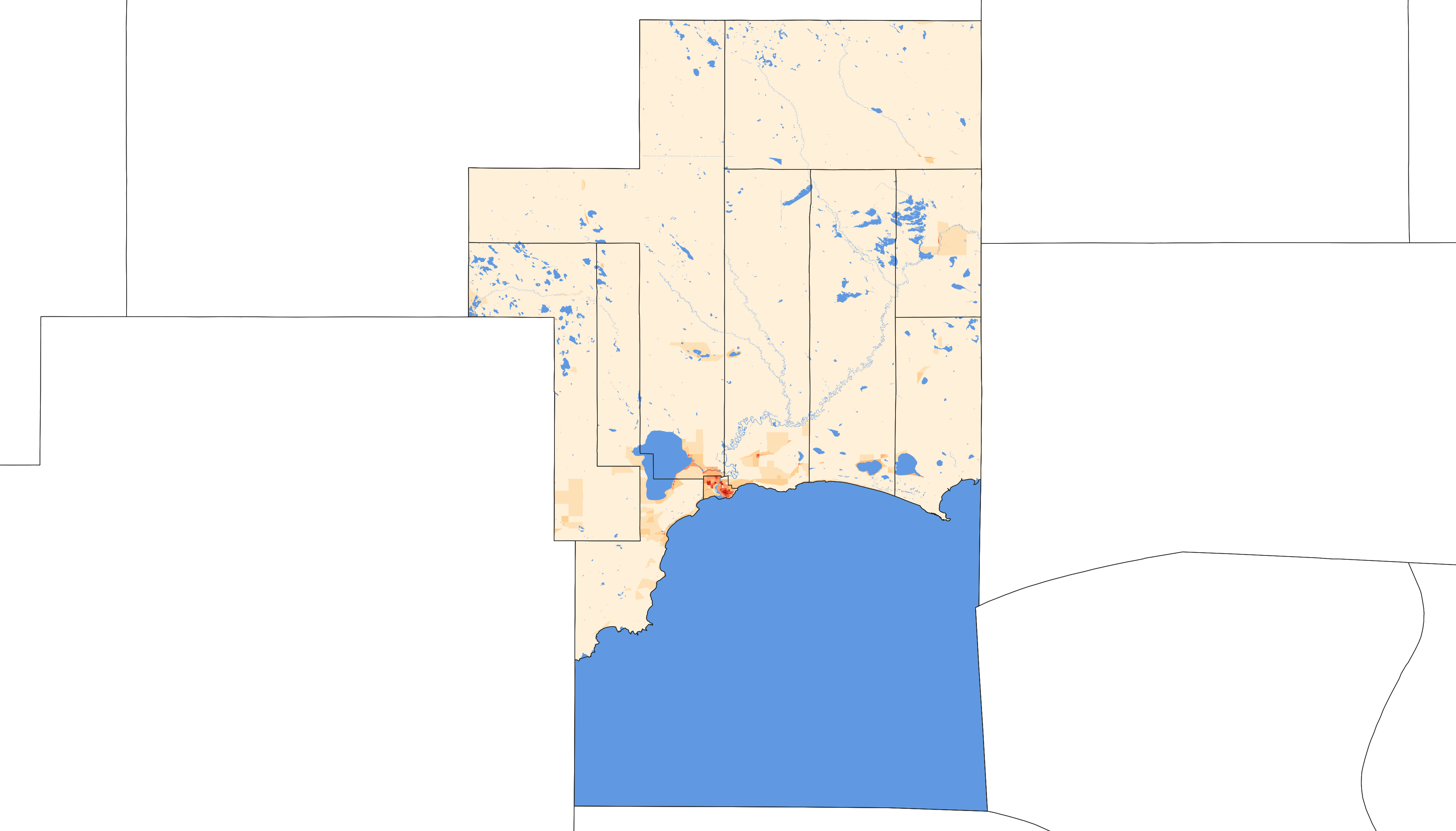
2020 population density of Schoolcraft County MI by census block

=== Racial and ethnic composition ===
Schoolcraft County, Michigan – Racial and ethnic composition Note: the US Census treats Hispanic/Latino as an ethnic category. This table excludes Latinos from the racial categories and assigns them to a separate category. Hispanics/Latinos may be of any race.
Race / Ethnicity (NH = Non-Hispanic)	Pop 1980	Pop 1990	Pop 2000	Pop 2010	Pop 2020	% 1980	% 1990	% 2000	% 2010	% 2020
White alone (NH)	8,184	7,732	7,846	7,394	6,727	95.44%	93.13%	88.13%	87.14%	83.60%
Black or African American alone (NH)	3	7	140	11	10	0.03%	0.08%	1.57%	0.13%	0.12%
Native American or Alaska Native alone (NH)	351	518	533	735	699	4.09%	6.24%	5.99%	8.66%	8.69%
Asian alone (NH)	13	13	37	13	15	0.15%	0.16%	0.42%	0.15%	0.19%
Native Hawaiian or Pacific Islander alone (NH)	x	x	0	0	1	x	x	0.00%	0.00%	0.01%
Other race alone (NH)	4	0	20	4	5	0.05%	0.00%	0.22%	0.05%	0.06%
Mixed race or Multiracial (NH)	x	x	244	264	494	x	x	2.74%	3.11%	6.14%
Hispanic or Latino (any race)	20	32	83	64	96	0.23%	0.39%	0.93%	0.75%	1.19%
Total	8,575	8,302	8,903	8,485	8,047	100.00%	100.00%	100.00%	100.00%	100.00%

=== 2020 census ===
As of the 2020 census, the county had a population of 8,047. The median age was 52.6 years; 17.3% of residents were under the age of 18, and 28.2% were 65 years of age or older. For every 100 females there were 97.4 males, and for every 100 females age 18 and over there were 96.4 males age 18 and over.

The racial makeup of the county was 84.0% White, 0.1% Black or African American, 8.7% American Indian and Alaska Native, 0.2% Asian, <0.1% Native Hawaiian and Pacific Islander, 0.1% from some other race, and 6.9% from two or more races. Hispanic or Latino residents of any race comprised 1.2% of the population.

<0.1% of residents lived in urban areas, while 100.0% lived in rural areas.

There were 3,657 households in the county, of which 21.9% had children under the age of 18 living in them. Of all households, 48.0% were married-couple households, 20.1% were households with a male householder and no spouse or partner present, and 23.6% were households with a female householder and no spouse or partner present. About 31.9% of all households were made up of individuals and 16.6% had someone living alone who was 65 years of age or older.

There were 5,955 housing units, of which 38.6% were vacant. Among occupied housing units, 82.4% were owner-occupied and 17.6% were renter-occupied. The homeowner vacancy rate was 2.9% and the rental vacancy rate was 10.7%.

=== 2010 census ===
The 2010 United States census indicated Schoolcraft County had a population of 8,485.

In 2010, there were 3,759 households, out of which 22.2% had children under the age of 18 living with them, 51.9% were married couples living together, 8.1% had a female householder with no husband present, and 35.5% were non-families. 30.9% of all households were made up of individuals, and 14.7% had someone living alone who was 65 years of age or older. The average household size was 2.22 and the average family size was 2.72.

The county population contained 19.9% under the age of 18, 6.0% from 18 to 24, 19.6% from 25 to 44, 33.3% from 45 to 64, and 21.3% who were 65 years of age or older. The median age was 48.3 years. The population was 49.5% male and 50.5% female.

In 2010, the median income for a household in the county was $38,367, and the median income for a family was $49,561. The per capita income for the county was $21,134. About 11.7% of families and 15.1% of the population were below the poverty line, including 20.3% of those under age 18 and 9.2% of those age 65 or over. The 2021 estimates determined the median household income was approximately $54,163.

=== 2000 census ===
Of its population in 2001, 87.6% of the population were White, 8.8% Native American, 0.2% Asian, 0.1% Black or African American, 0.1% of some other race and 3.3% of two or more races. Among them, 0.8% were Hispanic or Latino (of any race); 16.2% were of German, 13.2% French, French Canadian or Cajun, 7.8% Swedish, 6.7% Irish, 5.3% Polish, 5.2% English and 5.1% American ancestry.

== Government ==
Schoolcraft County has been Republican-leaning from its start. Since 1876, the Republican Party nominee has carried the county vote in 71% of the elections (27 of 38 elections).

United States presidential election results for Schoolcraft County, Michigan
Year	Republican		Democratic		Third party(ies)	
Year	No.	%	No.	%	No.	%
1876	121	52.84%	103	44.98%	5	2.18%
1880	157	79.29%	41	20.71%	0	0.00%
1884	518	62.48%	289	34.86%	22	2.65%
1888	590	47.81%	589	47.73%	55	4.46%
1892	570	41.79%	650	47.65%	144	10.56%
1896	973	62.86%	548	35.40%	27	1.74%
1900	1,141	69.91%	460	28.19%	31	1.90%
1904	1,472	83.49%	225	12.76%	66	3.74%
1908	1,360	79.44%	289	16.88%	63	3.68%
1912	595	37.95%	337	21.49%	636	40.56%
1916	994	58.96%	623	36.95%	69	4.09%
1920	1,776	71.33%	428	17.19%	286	11.49%
1924	1,515	61.34%	190	7.69%	765	30.97%
1928	1,826	66.81%	877	32.09%	30	1.10%
1932	1,722	49.05%	1,660	47.28%	129	3.67%
1936	1,430	36.81%	2,333	60.05%	122	3.14%
1940	2,003	46.22%	2,320	53.53%	11	0.25%
1944	1,704	49.43%	1,724	50.01%	19	0.55%
1948	1,713	49.70%	1,651	47.90%	83	2.41%
1952	2,352	58.05%	1,692	41.76%	8	0.20%
1956	2,453	58.73%	1,723	41.25%	1	0.02%
1960	2,183	50.79%	2,107	49.02%	8	0.19%
1964	1,397	34.27%	2,675	65.63%	4	0.10%
1968	1,745	45.40%	1,869	48.62%	230	5.98%
1972	2,310	56.01%	1,759	42.65%	55	1.33%
1976	1,933	46.53%	2,158	51.95%	63	1.52%
1980	2,097	47.94%	1,964	44.90%	313	7.16%
1984	2,139	52.47%	1,920	47.09%	18	0.44%
1988	1,802	46.37%	2,071	53.29%	13	0.33%
1992	1,253	30.35%	2,139	51.80%	737	17.85%
1996	1,200	31.00%	2,187	56.50%	484	12.50%
2000	2,088	49.74%	2,036	48.50%	74	1.76%
2004	2,267	51.05%	2,137	48.12%	37	0.83%
2008	2,058	47.47%	2,184	50.38%	93	2.15%
2012	2,142	52.75%	1,865	45.92%	54	1.33%
2016	2,556	61.19%	1,369	32.77%	252	6.03%
2020	3,090	65.12%	1,589	33.49%	66	1.39%
2024	3,196	65.25%	1,631	33.30%	71	1.45%

United States Senate election results for Schoolcraft County, Michigan1
Year	Republican		Democratic		Third party(ies)	
Year	No.	%	No.	%	No.	%
2024	3,032	63.25%	1,629	33.98%	133	2.77%

Michigan Gubernatorial election results for Schoolcraft County
Year	Republican		Democratic		Third party(ies)	
Year	No.	%	No.	%	No.	%
2022	2,264	58.23%	1,527	39.27%	97	2.49%

Schoolcraft County operates the County jail, Schoolcraft County Public Transit, maintains rural roads, operates the major local courts, records deeds, mortgages, and vital records, administers public health regulations, and participates with the state in the provision of social services. The county board of commissioners controls the budget and has limited authority to make laws or ordinances. In Michigan, most local government functions — police and fire, building and zoning, tax assessment, street maintenance, etc. — are the responsibility of individual cities and townships.

== Historic places ==
The National Register of Historic Places listings in Schoolcraft County, Michigan are:

- Ten Curves Road – Manistique River Bridge – Ten Curves Rd. over Manistique River in Gemfask Township (added December 17, 1999)
- Manistique East Breakwater Light – at offshore end of east breakwater, approx. 1,800 ft. from shore (added September 6, 2005)
- Manistique Pumping Station – on Deer St. (added October 26, 1981)
- Seul Choix Pointe Light Station – County Rd. 431 in Gulliver (added July 17, 1984)
- Ekdahl-Goudreau Site – west of Seul Choix Point (added November 16, 1978).

== See also ==
- List of Michigan State Historic Sites in Schoolcraft County, Michigan
