= Michigan's 106th House of Representatives district =

American legislative district

Michigan's 106th State House of Representatives district
Representative
Cam Cavitt; R–Cheboygan
- Demographics: 92.1% White; 0.7% Black; 1.7% Hispanic; 0.4% Asian; 0.7% Native American; 0.3% Other; 4.2% Multiracial
- Population (2024): 92,255

Michigan's 106th House of Representatives district (also referred to as Michigan's 106th House district) is a legislative district within the Michigan House of Representatives located in parts of Cheboygan and Oscoda counties, as well as all of Alcona, Alpena, Montmorency, and Presque Isle counties. The district was created in 1965, when the Michigan House of Representatives district naming scheme changed from a county-based system to a numerical one.

== List of representatives ==
Representative	Party	Dates	Residence	Notes
Clayton T. Morrison	Republican	1965–1966	Pickford	
Robert William Davis	Republican	1967–1970	St. Ignace	
Richard Friske	Republican	1971–1972	Charlevoix	
Mark L. Thompson	Republican	1973–1974	Rogers City	
E. Dan Stevens	Republican	1975–1978	Atlanta	
Steve Andrews	Republican	1979–1982	Wolverine	
John Pridnia	Republican	1983–1990	Harrisville	
Beverly A. Bodem	Republican	1991–1998	Alpena	
Andy Neumann	Democratic	1999–2002	Alpena	
Matthew Gillard	Democratic	2003–2008	Alpena	
Andy Neumann	Democratic	2009–2010	Alpena	
Peter Pettalia	Republican	2011–2016	Presque Isle	Died in office.
Sue Allor	Republican	2017–2022	Wolverine	
Cam Cavitt	Republican	2023–present	Cheboygan	

== Recent elections ==
=== 2020s ===
2026 Michigan House of Representatives election
Party	Candidate	Votes	%
Republican	Cam Cavitt (incumbent)	31,867	68.65
Democratic	Mary Lucille Hamilton	14,555	31.35
Total votes		46,422	100
Republican hold			

2024 Michigan House of Representatives election
Party	Candidate	Votes	%
Republican	Cam Cavitt	39,397	69.6
Democratic	Trina Borenstein	17,221	30.4
Total votes		56,618	100
Republican hold			

2022 Michigan House of Representatives election
Party	Candidate	Votes	%
Republican	Cam Cavitt	30,306	65.0
Democratic	Marie Fielder	16,332	35.0
Total votes		46,638	100
Republican hold			

2020 Michigan House of Representatives election
Party	Candidate	Votes	%
Republican	Sue Allor	38,313	69.4
Democratic	LeeAnn Johnson	16,917	30.6
Total votes		55,230	100
Republican hold			

2018 Michigan House of Representatives election
Party	Candidate	Votes	%
Republican	Sue Allor	26,498	61.0
Democratic	Lora Greene	16,935	39.0
Total votes		43,433	100
Republican hold			

2016 Michigan House of Representatives election
Party	Candidate	Votes	%
Republican	Sue Allor	29,798	61.3
Democratic	Robert Kennedy	16,937	34.9
Libertarian	Dana Carver	1,838	3.8
Write-in	John Caplis	3	0.0
Total votes		48,576	100
Republican hold			

2014 Michigan House of Representatives election
Party	Candidate	Votes	%
Republican	Peter Pettalia	18,614	55.0
Democratic	Robert Kennedy	15,219	45.0
Total votes		33,833	100
Republican hold			

2012 Michigan House of Representatives election
Party	Candidate	Votes	%
Republican	Peter Pettalia	24,522	52.2
Democratic	Kenneth Hubbard	21,261	45.3
Green	John Longhurst	1,178	2.5
Total votes		46,961	100
Republican hold			

2010 Michigan House of Representatives election
Party	Candidate	Votes	%
Republican	Peter Pettalia	18,096	57.7
Democratic	Casey Viegelahn	11,744	37.5
Independent	Nicholas Hein	1,498	4.8
Total votes		31,338	100
Republican gain from Democratic			

2008 Michigan House of Representatives election
Party	Candidate	Votes	%
Democratic	Andy Neumann	23,438	53.1
Republican	Peter Pettalia	19,345	43.9
Libertarian	Scott Alexander	1,321	3.0
Total votes		44,104	100
Democratic gain from Republican			

== Historical district boundaries ==
Map	Description	Apportionment Plan	Notes
	Antrim County; Charlevoix County; Chippewa County (part); Bruce Township; Dafter Township; DeTour Township; Drummond Township; Hulbert Township; Kinross Township; Pickford Township; Raber Township; Rudyard Township; Trout Lake Township; Emmet County; Kalkaska County (part); Bear Lake Township; Blue Lake Township; Clearwater Township; Cold Springs Township; Excelsior Township; Garfield Township; Kalkaska Township; Oliver Township; Rapid River Township; Mackinac County; Otsego County	1964 Apportionment Plan	
	Alpena County; Antrim County (part); Warner Township; Charlevoix County (part); Boyne City; Boyne Valley Township; Chandler Township; Evangeline Township; Hudson Township; Melrose Township; Cheboygan County (part); Excluding; Munro Township; Montmorency County (part); Excluding; Albert Township; Loud Township (part); Otsego County; Presque Isle County	1972 Apportionment Plan	
	Alcona County; Alpena County; Cheboygan County; Montmorency County; Presque Isle County	1982 Apportionment Plan	
	Alpena County; Charlevoix County; Cheboygan County; Presque Isle County	1992 Apportionment Plan	
	Alcona County; Alpena County; Crawford County; Montmorency County; Oscoda County; Presque Isle County	2001 Apportionment Plan	
	Alcona County; Alpena County; Cheboygan County (part); Aloha Township; Benton Township; Burt Township; Ellis Township; Forest Township; Grant Township; Inverness Township; Mentor Township; Mullett Township; Nunda Township; Walker Township; Waverly Township; Wilmot Township; Iosco County; Presque Isle County	2011 Apportionment Plan	
