= Topinabee, Michigan =

- Unincorporated community
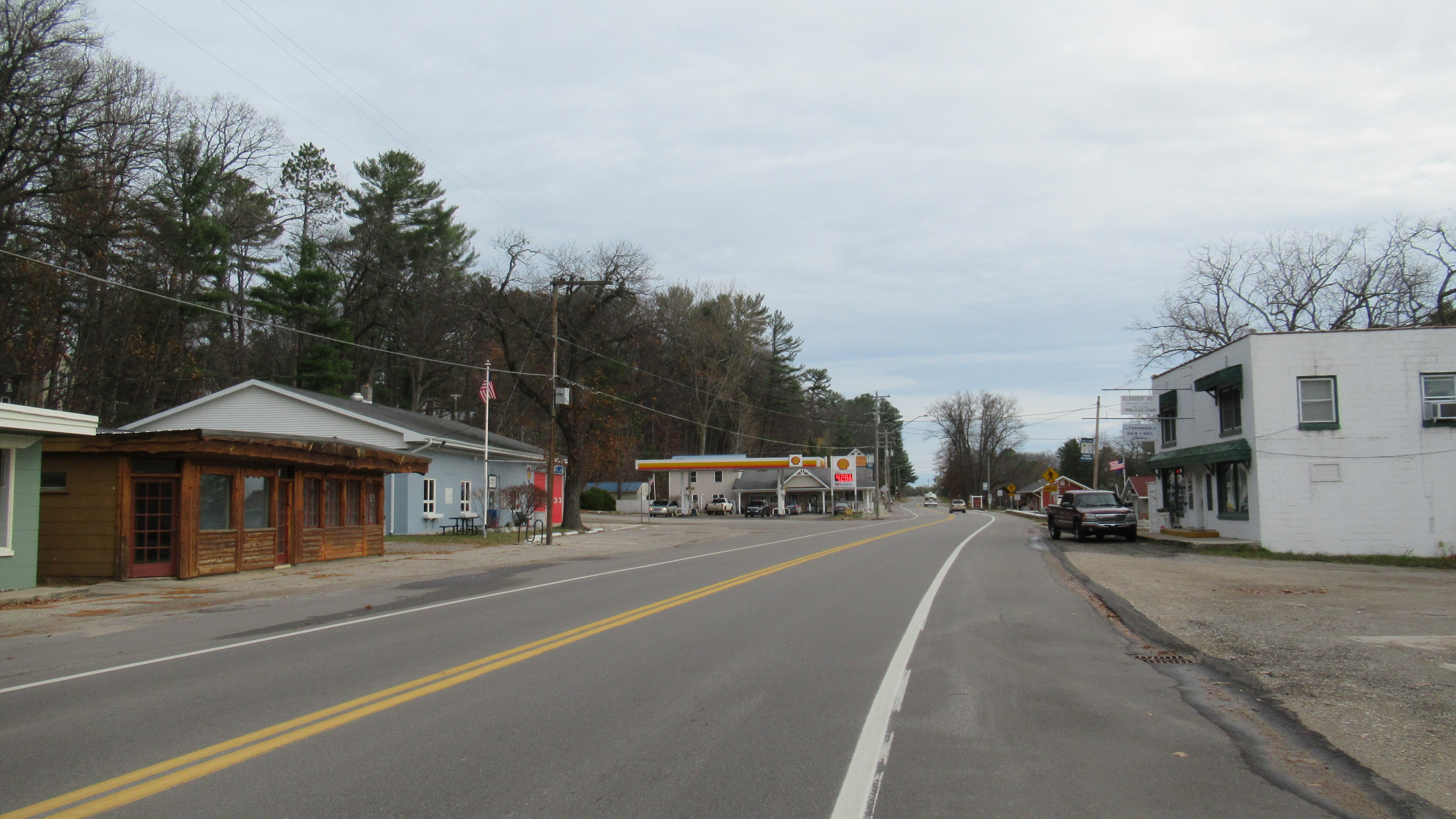
- Looking north along N. Straits Highway (M-27)
- Motto: "A small community with a big heart"
- Location within the state of Michigan Location within the United States
- Coordinates: 45°29′02″N 84°35′43″W
- Country: United States
- State: Michigan
- County: Cheboygan
- Township: Mullett
- Settled: 1881
- Elevation: 722 ft (220 m)
- Time zone: UTC-5 (Eastern (EST))
  - Summer (DST): UTC-4 (EDT)
- ZIP code(s): 49721 (Cheboygan); 49749 (Indian River); 49791
- Area code: 231
- GNIS feature ID: 1614963
- Website: Community website

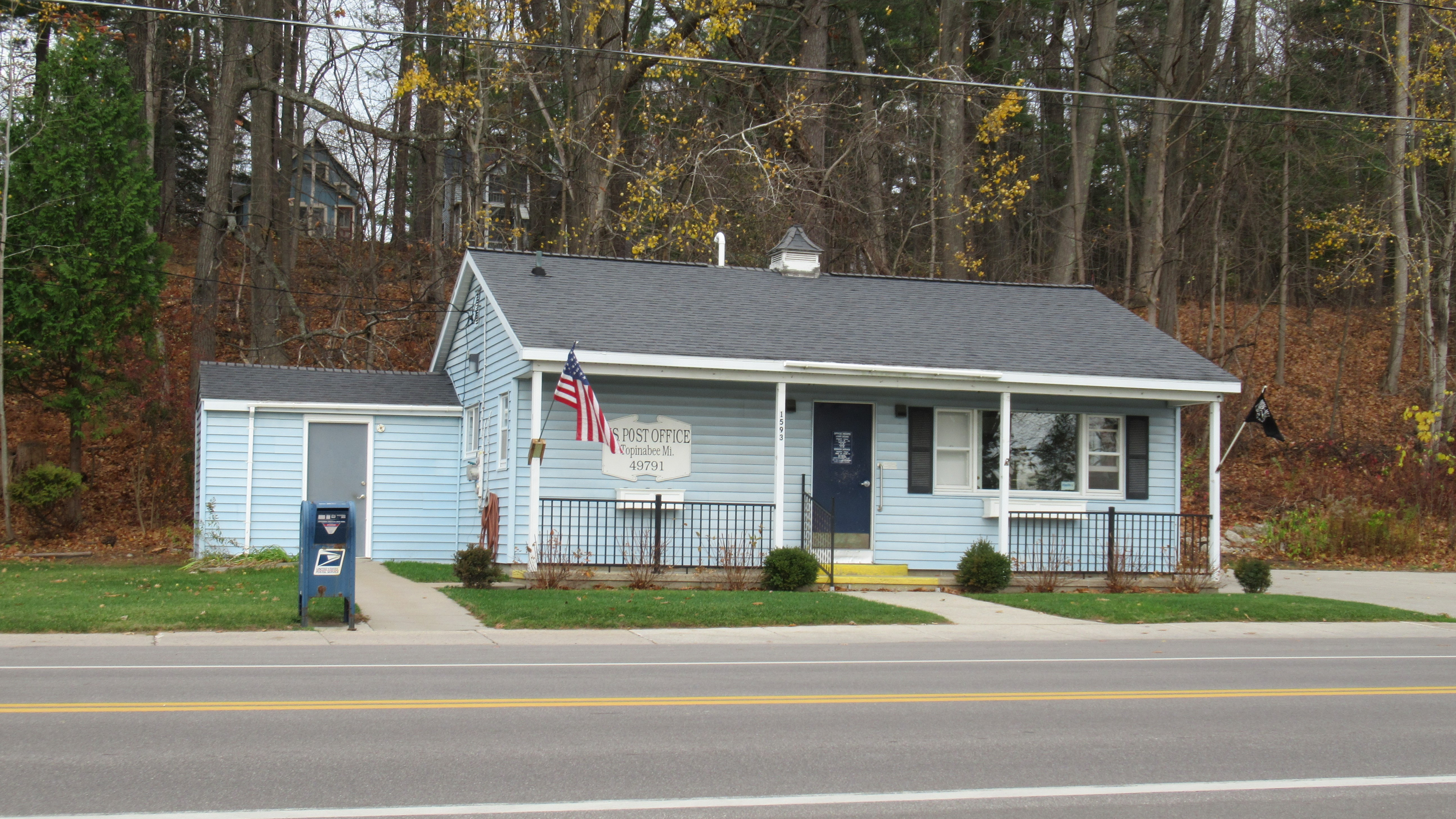
U.S. Post Office in Topinabee

Topinabee (/tɒpˈɪnʌbiː/ top-EN-ə-bee) is an unincorporated community in Cheboygan County in the U.S. state of Michigan. The community is located within Mullet Township along the southwestern shores of Mullett Lake.

As an unincorporated community, Topinabee has no legally defined boundaries or population statistics of its own but does have its own post office with the 49791 ZIP Code.

== Geography ==
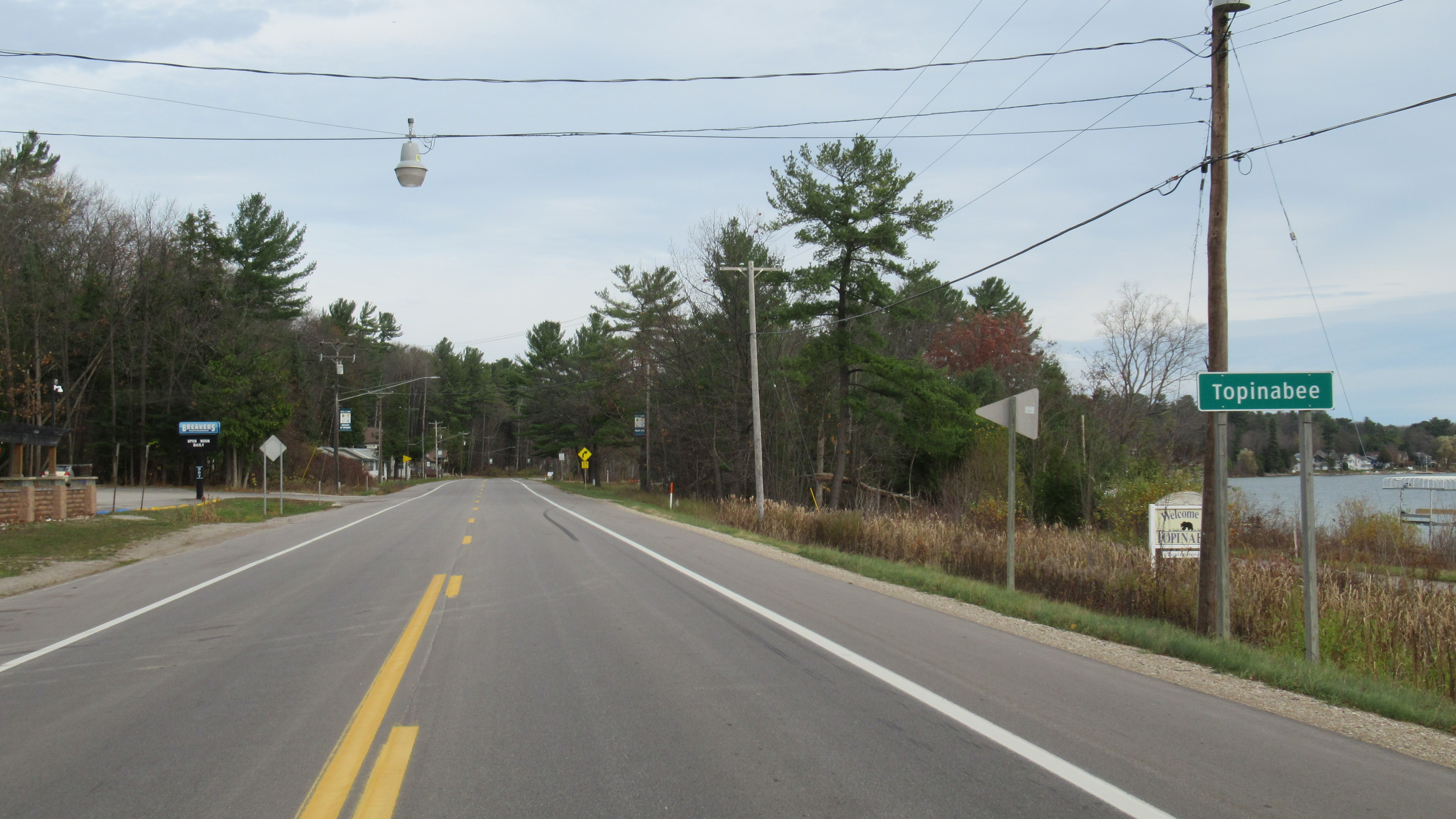
Signage along N. Straits Highway (M-27)

Topinabee is located in Mullett Township in Cheboygan County along the southwest shores of Mullett Lake. It is in the Northern Michigan region of the Lower Peninsula around 27 miles (43 km) south of the Mackinac Bridge.

The lakefront community is centered along M-27, which is known locally as North Straits Highway. Interstate 75 runs about 1.0 mile (1.6 km) to the west. Located along Mullett Lake, Burt Lake is 2.0 miles (3.2 km) to the west. The Indian River is to the south and connects the two large lakes, and this stretch of waterways is known as the Inland Waterway. The city of Cheboygan is about 12 miles (19 km) to the northeast. The census-designated place of Indian River is directly to the south. Numerous other lakefront unincorporated communities are located to the north along M-27, including Long Point, Birchwood, Silver Beach, and Mullett Lake.

Topinabee has its own post office with the 49791 ZIP Code, which is primarily used for post office box services. The post office is located in the center of the community at 1593 North Straits Highway. Most of the community itself is served by the Cheboygan 49791 ZIP Code, while areas to the south are served by the Indian River 49749 ZIP Code.

The Mullett Township Hall and Fire Department is located in Topinabee at 1491 North Straits Highway. The fire department serves the community, the portion of the Mullett Township on the west side of Mullett Lake, and portions of the neighboring townships. The community is served by Inland Lakes Schools centered just to the south in Indian River.

== History ==
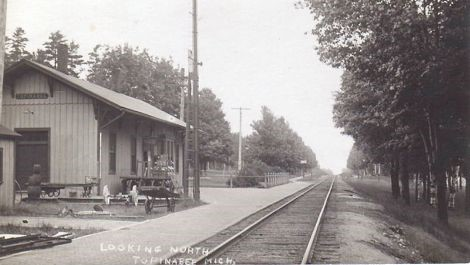
Train station in the early 1900s

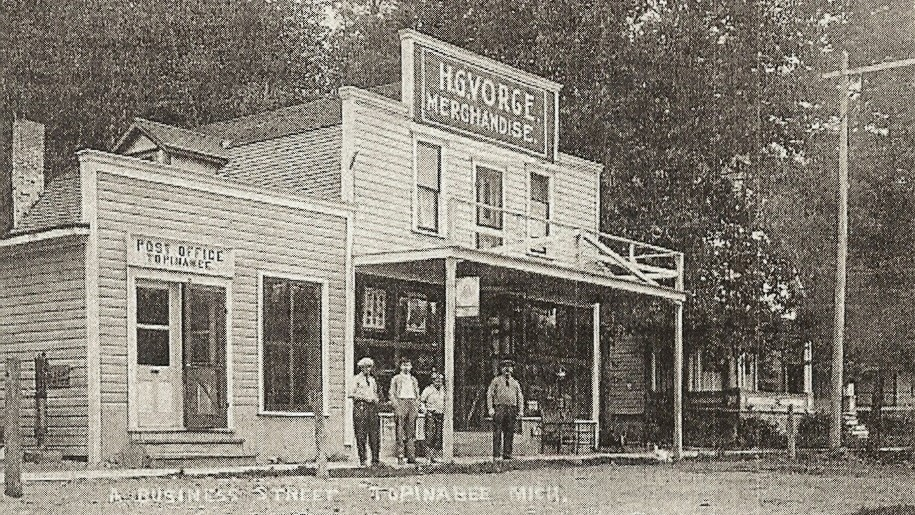
Former post office in 1917

The community was founded as early as 1881 when Michigan Central Railroad officials planned to establish a resort here on the southern shores of Mullett Lake. That year, hotel proprietor H. H. Pike moved to the area and platted the community. He named it for Potawatomi tribal leader Topinabee (Great Bear Heart), who beforehand signed the Treaty of Greenville in 1795. The treaty gave large areas of native lands to the European settlers, including Fort Dearborn. While Pike suggested the name Topinabee, the railroad company suggested the name Portage, but it was deemed too common of a name.

Pike, who was originally from Burlington, Vermont, moved to Niles, Michigan and frequently traveled up north through the area. He was so impressed with the location that he wanted to settle in the area in anticipation of the expanding railroad. Pike built his tavern on the west side of Mullett Lake prior to the railroad's construction. He purchased land, opened his business, and platted the community with the hopes that the railroad would pass through the area on its way to the Straits of Mackinac. Another settler built a hotel on the opposite side of the lake with the hopes that the railroad would instead run along the east side of Mullett Lake. In 1881, the Michigan Central Railroad constructed its line on the west side through Pike's property, and this led to the growth of the Topinabee community. The train depot was built the following year.

A post office in Topinabee opened on April 17, 1882 with Daniel Stofer serving as the first postmaster. A railroad depot was built near the shores of the lake about 8.0 miles (12.9 km) north of Indian River. The community centered along the railroad, and Pike's hotel served as a main business for early travelers. The hotel was three stories tall and could accommodate up to 40 guest. The community grew to include a boat launch along the Inland Waterway, a tavern, and a casino. By 1886, trains ran daily through Topinabee. Pike sold many plats of his property to allow settlers to build cottages, and Topinabee became a popular resort community. The community had a population of 34 in 1895.

The steamboat Topinabee was established in 1903 along the Inland Waterway. The Topinabee ran daily and took travelers from Oden through the Inland Waterway to Cheboygan with many stops along the way. The steamboat would sometimes head further north to St. Ignace. The steamship would stop in Topinabee for an hour along its route for passengers to have dinner. Several other steamboats also utilized the Inland Waterway, which, in addition to the railroad, brought many people to Topinabee.

Pike died in 1900, and Edward Bailey purchased the hotel and renamed it Pike's Summer Tavern. The hotel burned down in 1917 but was rebuilt the next year and named Hotel Topinabee. By this time, Topinabee had an established population and downtown area that included several shops and a bowling alley. The community became a popular tourist destination due to its scenic and peaceful environment. The hotel burned down again in 1928 and was rebuilt again. During the Great Depression, the hotel no longer became profitable and was sold to Edward Moloney for $850 in 1935. The hotel closed in 1950, and another fire in 1965 led to the hotel being razed in 1970.

=== Recent history ===
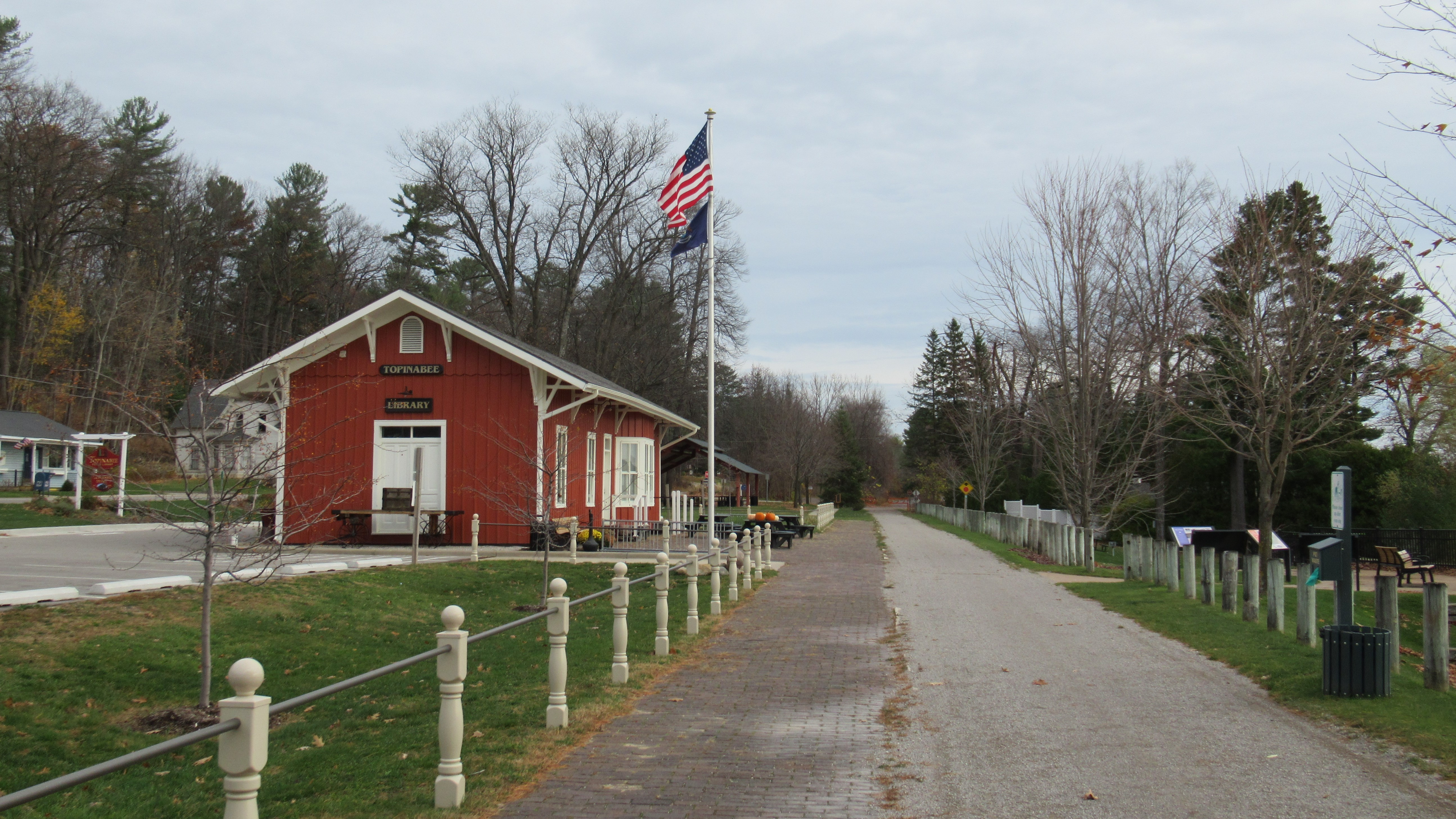
Topinabee Library and North Central State Trail

In 1958, the railway line was disestablished, and the train depot was bought by the township. The former station was converted into a historical museum and library, while the railway lines themselves were eventually removed. The structure was then converted into a full-time library, which still houses a safe that contains many historic railroad records and photographs.

By late-1961, Topinabee would benefit from the creation of M-27, which is a state highway that serves as a direct connector route from Interstate 75 in the south to U.S. Route 23 to the north in the city of Cheboygan. The highway passes directly through Topinabee and is known locally as North Straits Highway.

The path along the former railway line was converted into the North Central State Trail, which was completed in 2007. The 75-mile-long (121 km) trail is used primarily for biking, as well as snowmobiles during the winter. The trail connects Gaylord to Mackinaw City and runs directly through Topinabee along the shores of Lake Mullett. The Topinabee Trailhead is 5.4 miles (8.7 km) north of Indian River and continues north for 12.0 miles (19.3 km) to Cheboygan.

The Topinabee Library received a technology upgrade though a $7,804 grant by the Bill & Melinda Gates Foundation in July 2000. By early 2022, the library received numerous structural upgrades, including new paint, interior shelving, and improvements to the surrounding environment. The Topinabee Library is listed as part of the US-23 Heritage Route. The area around the library and Lake Mullett shoreline has been organized as the Topinabee Beach Park with modern amenities along the North Central State Trail.
