= E. Dan Stevens =

American politician

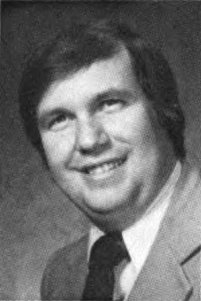

Member of the Michigan House of Representatives from the 106th district
- In office January 1, 1975 – December 31, 1978
- Preceded by: Mark L. Thompson
- Succeeded by: Steve Andrews

Personal details
- Born: May 2, 1943 (age 83)
- Party: Democratic

E. Dan Stevens (born May 2, 1943) was a member of the Michigan House of Representatives.

== Early life ==
Stevens was born on May 2, 1943.

== Career ==
On November 5, 1974, Stevens was elected to the Michigan House of Representatives where he represented the 106th district from January 8, 1975 to December 31, 1978. During his second term, Stevens served as the Vice-Chair of the Committee on Labor for the chamber. In 1994, was an unsuccessful candidate in the Democratic primary for the Michigan Senate seat representing the 34th district.

== Personal life ==
During his time in the legislature, Stevens resided in Atlanta, Michigan.
