= Sue Allor =

American politician from Michigan

Member of the Michigan House of Representatives from the 106 district
- In office January 1, 2017 – January 1, 2023
- Preceded by: Peter Pettalia
- Succeeded by: Cam Cavitt

Personal details
- Born: December 31, 1954 (age 71) Detroit, Michigan
- Party: Republican
- Spouse: Pat
- Children: 3
- Occupation: Politician

Sue Allor (born December 31, 1954) is an American politician from Michigan. A Republican, Allor was a member of the Michigan House of Representatives from 2017 to 2023, elected from District 106.

== Education ==
Allor holds a Bachelor of Science in Nursing degree from University of Detroit Mercy and an MBA from Lawrence Technological College.

== Career ==
Allor spent six years on the Cheboygan County Commission before being elected to the state House.

In 2016, Allor was elected as a Republican to the Michigan House of Representatives from District 106.

Allor is the chairperson of Subcommittee on Natural Resources and Environmental Quality. In 2018, Allor was an initial cosponsor of Republican legislation, introduced by Triston Cole, that would limit the ability of Michigan environmental regulators to adopt environmental-protection rules that are stricter than federal standards. The legislation was opposed by environmental groups and Democrats. Allor later withdrew her support, citing the bill's effect of preventing regulators from regulating PFAS groundwater contamination. The bill passed the state House on a 57–51 vote; Allor was one of six Republicans who joined all Democrats in voting no.

On November 6, 2018, Allor was re-elected. She received 61.01% of the vote, defeating Democratic nominee Lora Greene, who received 38.99%.

In 2021, amid the COVID-19 pandemic in Michigan, Allor also sponsored a bill to ban any governmental body, including public schools and colleges, from tracking COVID-19 vaccination statuses and requiring proof of vaccination. Allor criticized universities that required students to be vaccinated to live on campus. The bill passed the Republican-controlled state House on a 62–47 vote; it was opposed by Governor Gretchen Whitmer. Allor also sponsored legislation to prohibit employers from requiring employees to be vaccined against COVID-19, influenza, tetanus, diphtheria or pertussis. The same bill would ban employers from requiring unvaccinated workers to wear a face mask and from informing others that the employee was unvaccinated. At a House hearing on the bill, supporters of the bill espoused falsehoods and anti-vaccine misinformation.

Allor stood down at the 2022 Michigan House of Representatives election.

== Personal life ==
Allor's husband is Pat. They have three children. Allor and her family live in Wolverine, Michigan.

== See also ==
- 2016 Michigan House of Representatives election
- 2018 Michigan House of Representatives election
- 2020 Michigan House of Representatives election
