= Andy Neumann =

American politician

Member of the Michigan House of Representatives from the 106th district
- In office January 1, 2009 – December 31, 2010
- Preceded by: Matthew Gillard
- Succeeded by: Peter Pettalia
- In office January 1, 1999 – December 31, 2002
- Preceded by: Beverly A. Bodem
- Succeeded by: Matthew Gillard

Personal details
- Born: 1960 (age 65–66) Alpena, Michigan
- Party: Democratic
- Spouse: Sandi Neumann
- Profession: Paramedic, Firefighter, Realtor

Andrew Neumann (born 1960) is a Democratic state legislator from Michigan. He served in the Michigan State House of Representatives, representing the 106th District from 2009 to 2010. The 106th District is located in the North East Lower Peninsula and includes all of Alcona, Alpena, Crawford, Montmorency, Oscoda, and Presque Isle counties. He was elected on November 4, 2008 to replace outgoing Rep. Matthew Gillard. Neumann previously represented the 106th District from 1999–2003 and was an unsuccessful candidate for the Michigan State Senate in 2002. In 2003, he was appointed Fire Marshal for the State of Michigan.

== Biography ==
Andy Neumann was born in Alpena, Michigan in 1960. He graduated from Alpena High School and attended Alpena Community College, where he received a degree in business management. After college, Neumann became a firefighter and certified paramedic with the city of Alpena from 1982 to 1998. He owned a business called Northern Healthcare Management from 1990-1996. He lives in Alpena and Lansing. He has two daughters Kristin and Sarah.

== Political career ==
In 1996, Andy Neumann was elected to the Alpena County Commissioner where he served on Budget and Finance, Public Safety and Health, Law Enforcement, and Insurance Committees. In 1998, he announced his candidacy for the 106th State House District, which at that time included the Counties of Alpena, Presque Isle, Cheboygan, and Charlevoix. Neumann won the Democratic Primary and went on to narrowly defeat Republican Phil Ludlow in the General Election. Neumann was easily re-elected in 2000.

In 2002, Neumann ran for the open 36th District State Senate Seat, located in the North East Lower Peninsula. Neumann narrowly lost to Republican Tony Stamas, of Midland. He was succeeded in the State House by Democrat Matthew Gillard. In 2003, he was appointed Michigan State Fire Marshal.

Neumann's successor, Matthew Gillard, retired in 2008 because of term limits, which prevent a house member from serving more than three terms. Neumann announced his candidacy for the 106th District, which was slightly altered from the district he had represented previously, but still included his home in Alpena. Neumann won the Democratic Primary and went on to defeat Republican Peter Pettalia in the general election. Neumann is a conservative Democrat, receiving an "A" rating from the NRA Political Victory Fund, and while in the legislature, he was a strong advocate for gun rights, voting in favor of a plan to make it easier to carry concealed weapons and against a plan that would limit gun purchases to one gun per month.

Term limits prevented Neumann from running for re-election in 2010.
