= Peter Pettalia =

American politician (1955–2016)

Member of the Michigan House of Representatives from the 106th district
- In office January 1, 2011 – September 12, 2016
- Preceded by: Andy Neumann
- Succeeded by: Sue Allor

Personal details
- Born: Peter Anthony Pettalia; August 9, 1955 Detroit, Michigan, US
- Died: September 12, 2016 (aged 61) Montmorency County, Michigan
- Party: Republican
- Spouse: Karen
- Children: 2
- Website: Rep. Peter Pettalia

Peter A. Pettalia (August 9, 1955 – September 12, 2016) was a member of the Michigan House of Representatives, first elected in 2010 and re-elected to second and third terms in 2012 and 2014. His district consisted of Presque Isle, Alpena, Alcona, Iosco, and part of Cheboygan counties. Pettalia owned an auto repair business; he also was involved with the rental cabin business. Pettalia lived in Presque Isle, Michigan. He was killed in a motorcycle accident on September 12, 2016. Pettalia was wearing a helmet and the other driver was deemed at fault, resulting in a conviction of "moving violation causing death".
