= Cam Cavitt =

American politician from Michigan

Member of the Michigan House of Representatives from the 106th district
- Incumbent
- Assumed office January 1, 2023
- Preceded by: Sue Allor

Personal details
- Party: Republican
- Education: Kalamazoo Valley Community College

Cameron Cavitt is an American politician from Michigan serving as a member of the Michigan House of Representatives. He represents Michigan's 106th House District which includes the Northern Michigan counties of Alcona, Alpena, Montmorency, Presque Isle, and portions of Oscoda and Cheboygan.

== Career ==
Cavitt serves as a member of the House Appropriations Committee, Chairman of the Appropriations Subcommittee on the Department of Environment, Great Lakes, and Energy (EGLE), Vice Chair of the Appropriations Subcommittee on Military and Veteran Affairs, and as a member of the Labor and Economic Opportunity, and Corrections and Judiciary Appropriations Subcommittees.

Cavitt is a Realtor and served on the Cheboygan County Drain Commission prior to his election to the state House. Additionally, he served as the Northern Michigan Chairman for the Michigan Association of County Drain Commissioners. Cavitt has also served on the Cheboygan County Salvation Army, Cheboygan County Historical Society, and the Indian River Chamber of Commerce.

== Education ==
Cavitt received his associate degree from Kalamazoo Valley Community College, then attended Western Michigan University in Kalamazoo.

== Personal life ==
Cavitt and his wife, Lynn, have three children and reside in Cheboygan.

== See also ==
- Official website at the Michigan House of Representatives
- Page at Ballotpedia
