= Manistee Lake, Michigan =

- Census-designated place (CDP) & unincorporated community
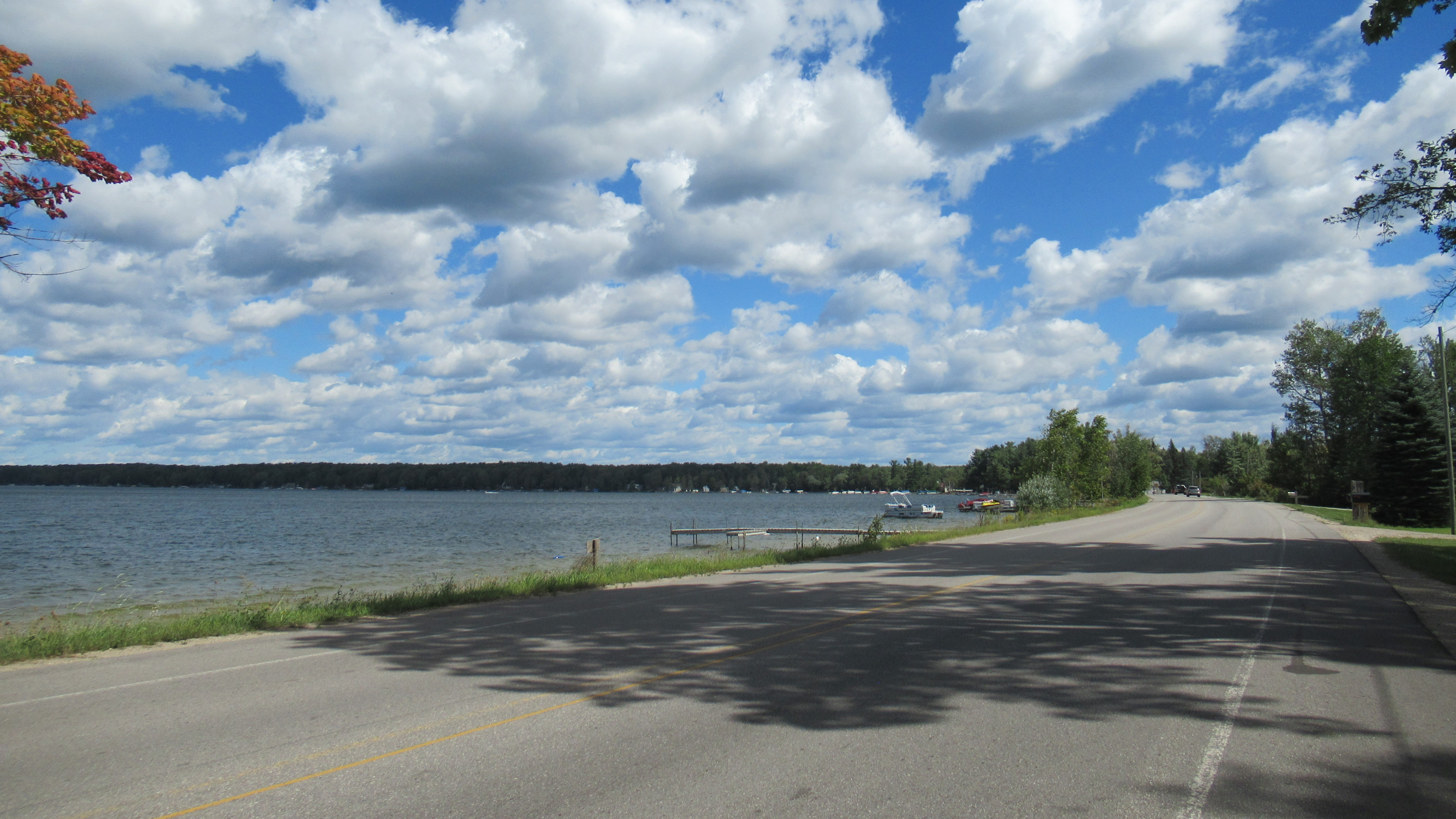
- View of the lake along County Road 612

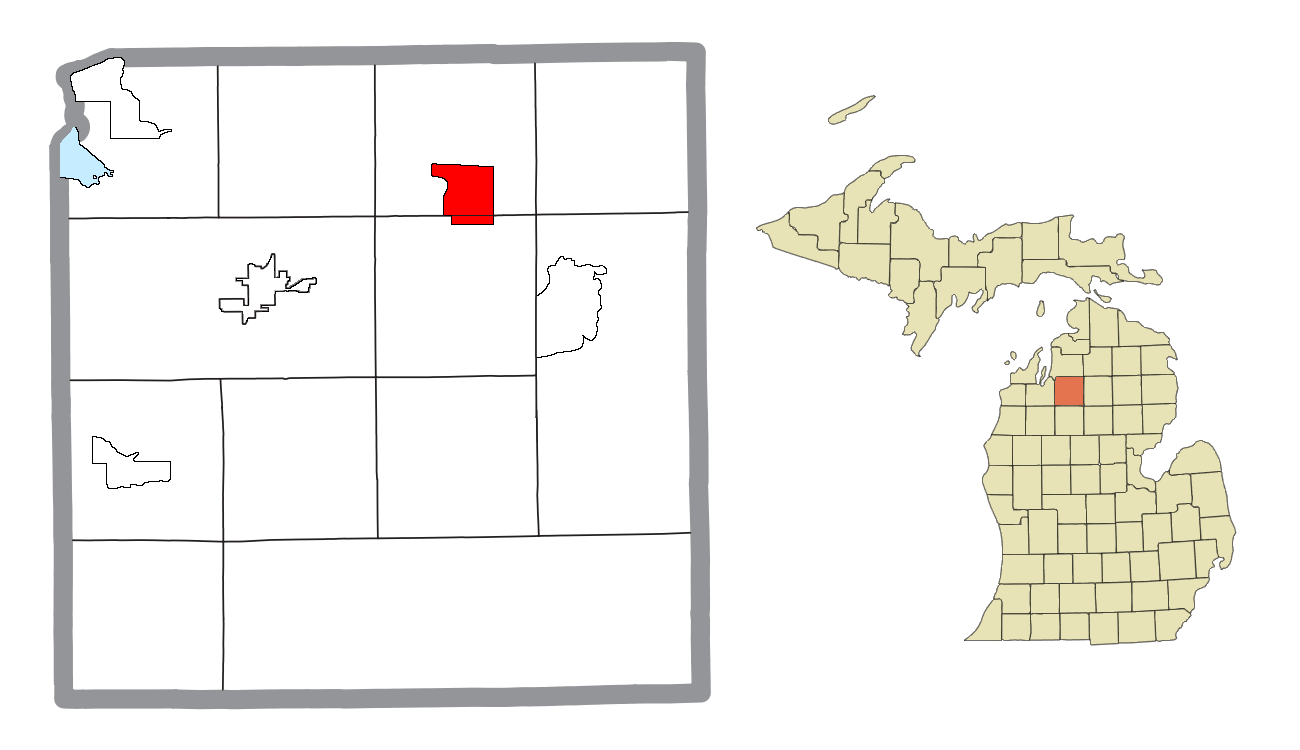
- Location within Kalkaska County

- Location within the state of Michigan Manistee Lake (the United States)
- Coordinates: 44°47′03″N 85°01′16″W
- Country: United States
- State: Michigan
- County: Kalkaska
- Townships: Coldsprings and Excelsior

Area
  - Total: 4.93 sq mi (12.78 km^{2})
  - Land: 3.56 sq mi (9.22 km^{2})
  - Water: 1.37 sq mi (3.56 km^{2})
- Elevation: 1,194 ft (364 m)

Population (2020)
  - Total: 465
  - Density: 130.6/sq mi (50.42/km^{2})
- Time zone: UTC-5 (Eastern (EST))
  - Summer (DST): UTC-4 (EDT)
- ZIP code(s): 49646 (Kalkaska)
- Area code: 231
- GNIS feature ID: 2583751

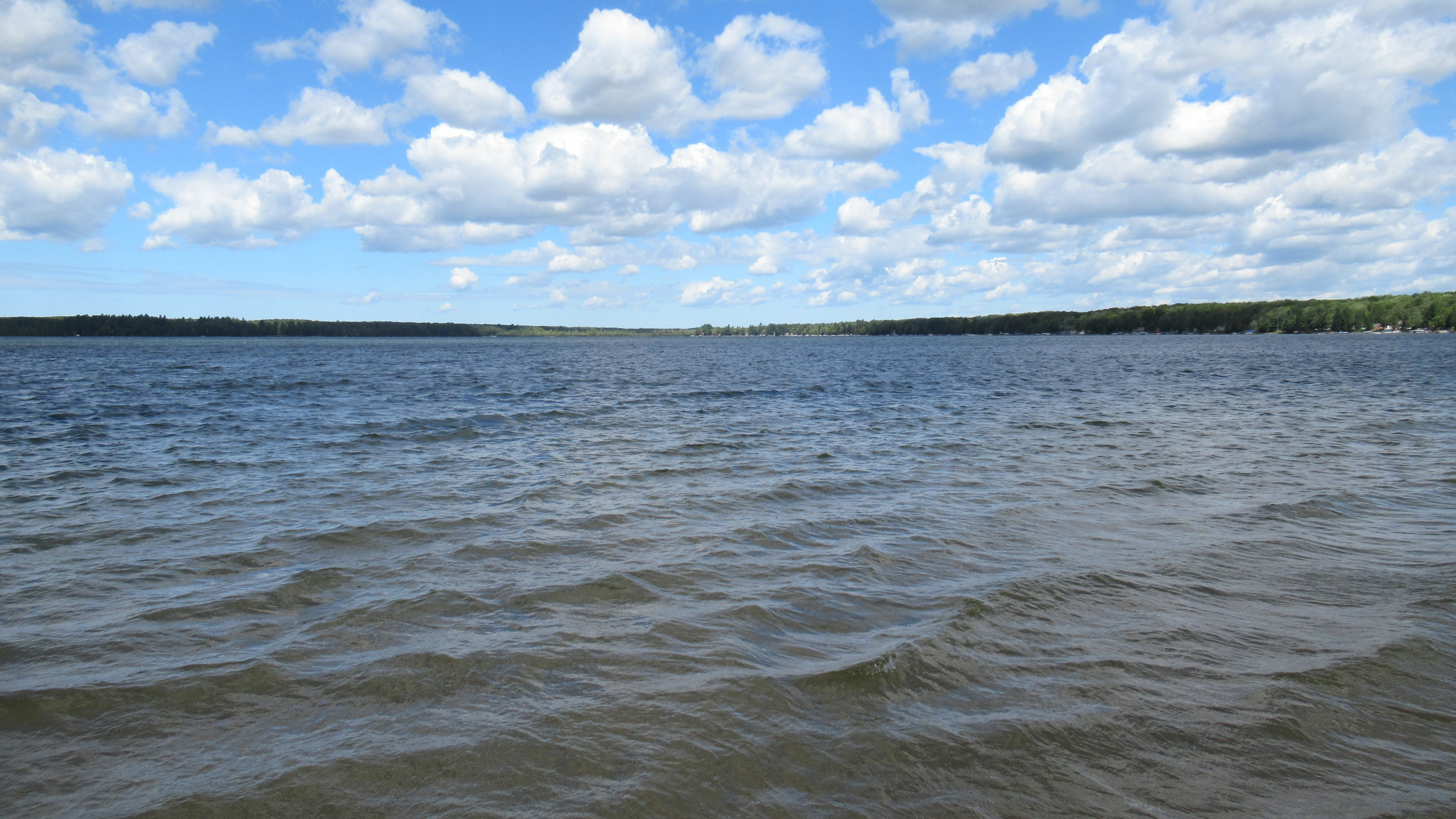
Manistee Lake

Manistee Lake is an unincorporated community and census-designated place (CDP) in Kalkaska County in the U.S. state of Michigan. At the 2020 census, the CDP had a population of 465. Manistee Lake is located within Coldsprings Township to the north and a small portion extending south into Excelsior Township.

== History ==
The community of Manistee Lake was listed as a newly-organized census-designated place for the 2010 census, meaning it now has officially defined boundaries and population statistics for the first time. The CDP is organized for statistical purposes only and has no legal status as an incorporated municipality.

== Geography ==
According to the United States Census Bureau, the Manistee Lake CDP has an area of 4.94 square miles (12.79 km^{2}), of which 3.56 square miles (9.22 km^{2}) is land and 1.38 square miles (3.57 km^{2}) (27.93%) is water.

The community surrounds Manistee Lake. The majority of the community and population is located within Coldsprings Township, which contains 4.18 square miles (10.83 km^{2}) of total area. A smaller portion extends to the south in Excelsior Township.

== Demographics ==
As of 2024, Manistee Lake's population was estmated as 412, a decrease from 2020. The population is 95.4 percent with 4.1% reporting as multiracial and .5% listed as Asian.

Historical population
Census	Pop.	Note	%±
2010	456		—
2020	465		2.0%
U.S. Decennial Census
