= M-27 (Michigan highway) =

State highway in Michigan, United States

M-27
- M-27 highlighted in red

Route information
- Maintained by MDOT
- Length: 16.763 mi (26.977 km)
- Existed: Late 1961–present

Major junctions
- South end: I-75 near Indian River
- M-33 near Aloha
- North end: US 23 / C-66 in Cheboygan

Location
- Country: United States
- State: Michigan
- Counties: Cheboygan

Highway system
- Michigan State Trunkline Highway System; Interstate; US; State; Byways
← US 27	→ M-28

M-27 is a north–south state trunkline highway in the extreme north of the Lower Peninsula of the US state of Michigan. The trunkline runs between Interstate 75 (I-75) just north of Indian River and Cheboygan, where it meets US Highway 23 (US 23) near Lake Huron. It remains as a relic of the old US 27 which disappeared north of Grayling after being supplanted by I-75, which lies close to old US 27 between Grayling and Indian River.

== Route description ==
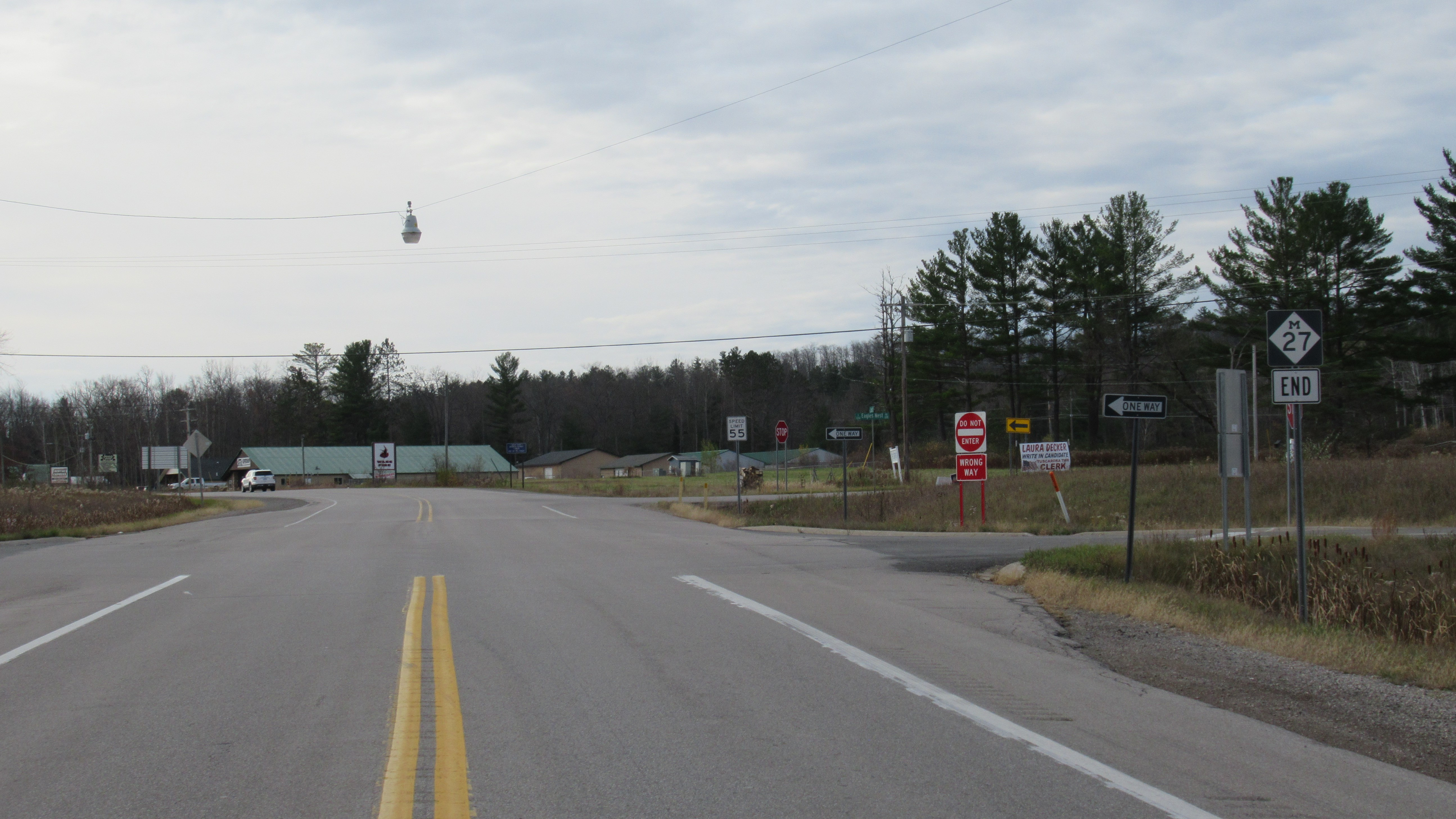
Southern terminus at I-75 north of Indian River

I-75 takes a more direct route between Indian River and Mackinaw City. M-27 follows old US 27 through Topinabee and Cheboygan. With US 23 it is a scenic, if indirect, alternative to I-75 on its approach to the Mackinac Bridge. M-27 runs along the western shore of Mullett Lake and forms the main street of Topinabee. The highway intersects M-33 near the confluence of the Cheboygan and Black rivers. North of the M-33 junction, M-27 runs parallel to the Cheboygan River on the west river bank into downtown Cheboygan.

M-27 has the local road name of Main Street in Cheboygan and Straits Highway outside of the city. State Street (US 23) and Main Street (M-27) form the two major streets in the Cheboygan street grid. The main downtown businesses are located along Main Street south to the city limits. The highway has not been listed on the National Highway System, a network of roads important to the country's defense, economy and mobility.

== History ==
=== Previous alignment ===
This is the second time a highway was designated M-27 in Michigan. The original M-27 was located in The Thumb, running from the Mount Clemens area east and north through New Baltimore to Port Huron. There it ran through Carsonville and Minden City to Harbor Beach and along Lake Huron to Port Austin. This version of M-27 was designated by July 1, 1919, and would last until 1926. All of the original M-27 was given to other contemporary highways including M-29 (Mount Clemens to Port Huron), M-51 (Port Huron to M-83), and M-29 (Harbor Beach to Port Austin).

=== Current alignment ===
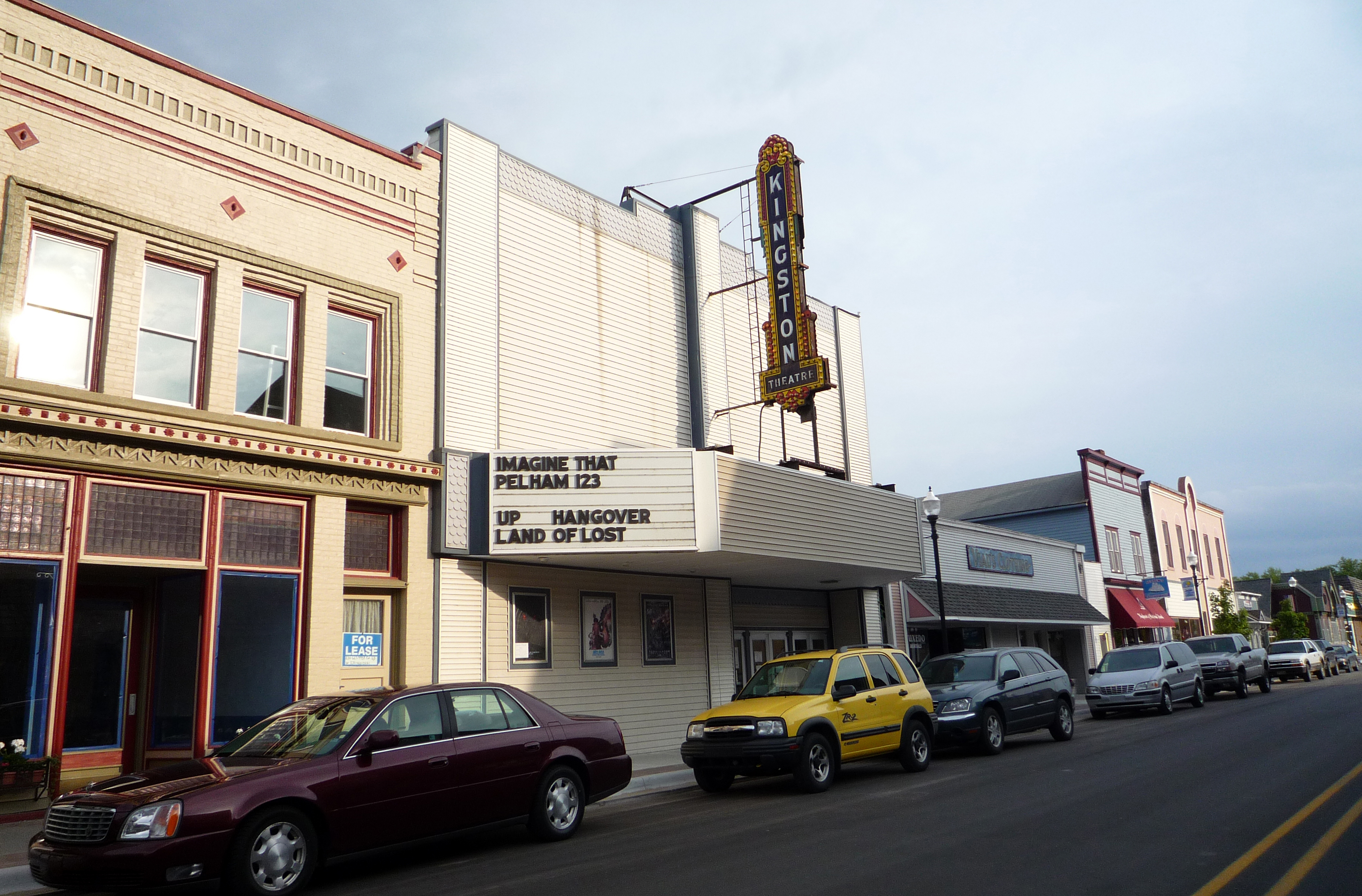
Kingston Theatre downtown Cheboygan on M-27 (Main Street)

In the late 1950s, US 27 was the main highway connection between Grayling, Gaylord, and Cheboygan. After the construction of the Mackinac Bridge, US 27 was extended north to St. Ignace. The construction of I-75 in the early 1960s rendered the northern portion of US 27 obsolete. Between Grayling and Indian River, I-75 replaced US 27 as the main highway in the area. North of Indian River, I-75 was built along a different routing. Where US 27 ran northwest through Topinabee to Cheboygan and then concurrently along US 23 to Mackinaw City, I-75 was built due north of Indian River before turning northwest parallel and several miles inland from Lake Huron, bypassing Cheboygan completely. M-27 was designated in the latter half of 1961 on the current alignment replacing US 27 which was truncated back to Grayling. Today, the stretch from Grayling to about Wolverine is known as Old 27, and from there to Indian River, it is called Straits Highway.

== Major intersections ==
The entire highway is in Cheboygan County.

Location	mi	km	Destinations	Notes
Mullett Township	0.000	0.000	I-75 – Saginaw, Mackinac Bridge; Straits Highway south – Indian River	Exit 313 on I-75; roadway continues as Straits Highway
Inverness Township	13.309	21.419	M-33 south – Onaway	Northern terminus of M-33
Inverness Township	14.130	22.740	C-64 west (VFW Road)	Eastern terminus of C-64
Cheboygan	16.763	26.977	US 23 / LHCT – Mackinaw City, Rogers City, Alpena C-66 west (State Street to Levering Road)	C-66 approaches from the west and terminates; US 23 continues through to the east or north
1.000 mi = 1.609 km; 1.000 km = 0.621 mi
