= Beverly A. Bodem =

American politician

Member of the Michigan House of Representatives from the 106th district
- In office January 1, 1991 – December 31, 1998
- Preceded by: John Pridnia
- Succeeded by: Andy Neumann

Personal details
- Born: February 22, 1940 (age 86) Wisconsin
- Party: Republican
- Spouse: Dennis

Beverly A. Bodem is an American politician who was a Republican member of the Michigan House of Representatives, representing part of the northeastern Lower Peninsula from 1991 through 1998.

Born in Wisconsin in 1940, Bodem attended Wood County Teachers College, the University of Wisconsin, Lansing Community College, and Alpena Community College and studied elementary education and health sciences/nursing.

She held several positions with two radio stations and was a real estate sales associate for four years. Bodem also coordinated the health care assistant training program at Alpena Community College and worked for then-State Representative John Pridnia. She was a charter member of the Alpena General Hospital Auxiliary and served on several community boards.
