= Excelsior Township School District 1 =

School district in Michigan

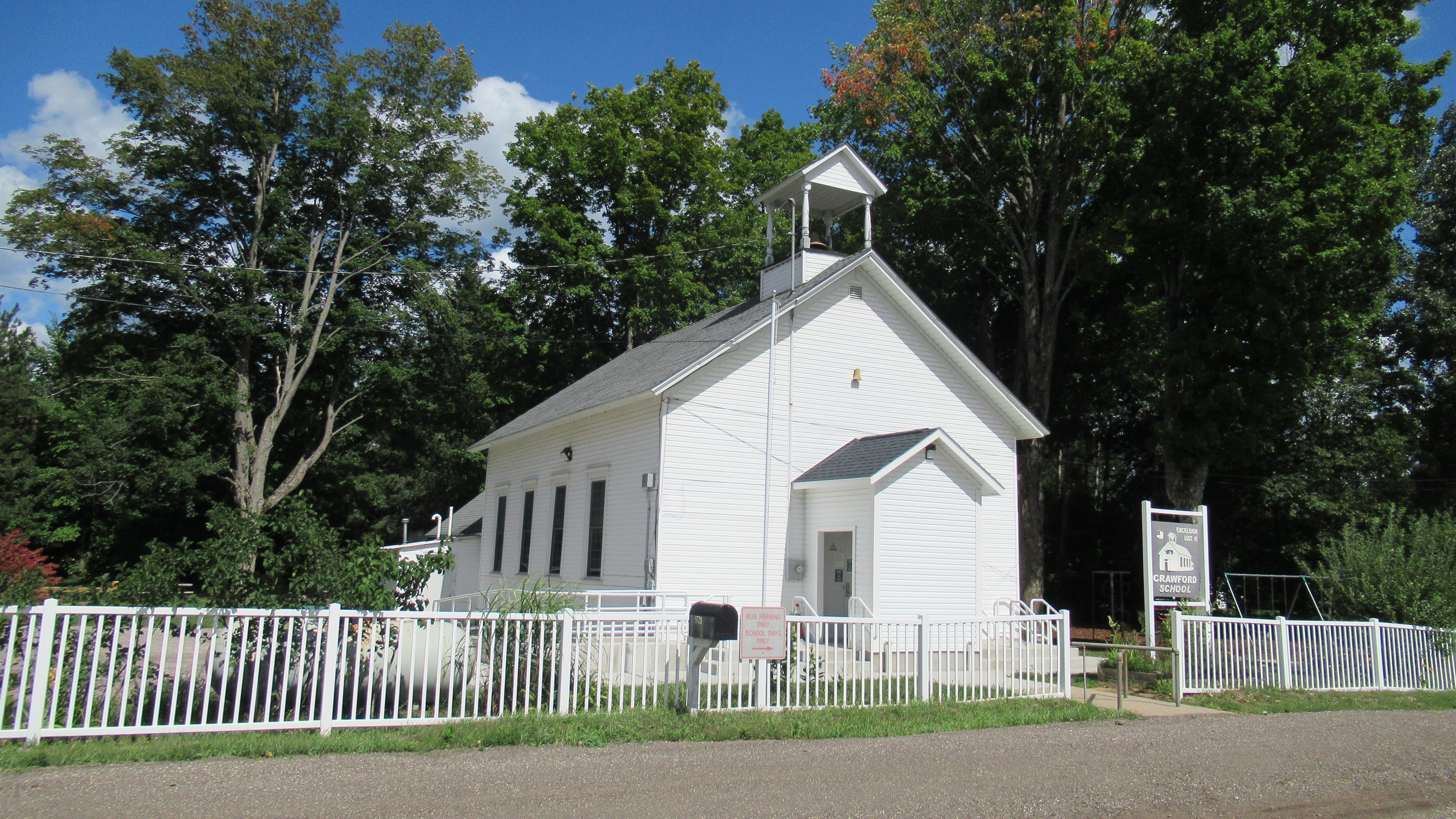
- The Crawford School along M-72

Address
- 5521 M-72 NE Excelsior Township, Michigan 49646
- Coordinates: 44°42′49″N 85°03′46″W

District information
- Type: Public
- Grades: K–8
- Established: 1875

Other information
- Website: Official website

Excelsior Township School District 1 is a K-8 school district in Excelsior Township, Michigan. It operates a single one-room school, Crawford School, one of twenty such schools in Michigan as of 2016. The school is located between Grayling and Kalkaska, with the building 8 miles (13 km) east of the latter.

The district was established in 1875.

The district has 17 square miles (44 km^{2}) of area.

== Operations ==
In 2010 there were fifty students, the highest enrollment within a ten-year span. As of 2016 there were forty students, with twenty-five of them living outside of the district boundaries and attending Excelsior due to the school of choice program; some choose the school due to the low student-teacher ratio. That year there was a combined superintendent and principal, as well as three teachers and one teacher's aide/janitor/counselor.

As of 2016 the yearly budget is $450,000. The district operates a single school bus and provides laptops and iPads, but does not have a regular cafeteria service.

The school does not offer athletics, so students may participate in athletic teams at schools operated by Kalkaska Public Schools and Mancelona Public Schools.

The Northwest Educational Services, formerly the Traverse Bay Area Intermediate School District, supports the district.
