= John Pridnia =

American politician

Member of the Michigan Senate from the 36th district
- In office January 1, 1991 – December 31, 1994
- Preceded by: Connie Binsfeld
- Succeeded by: George A. McManus, Jr.

Member of the Michigan House of Representatives from the 106th district
- In office January 1, 1983 – December 31, 1990
- Preceded by: Steve Andrews
- Succeeded by: Beverly A. Bodem

Personal details
- Born: John Douglas Pridnia; March 16, 1943 Detroit, Michigan, U.S.
- Died: November 17, 2016 (aged 73) Port Austin, Michigan, U.S.
- Party: Republican
- Spouse: Lisa Dailey (1997 - his death)
- Education: Macomb Community College; Wayne State University
- Occupation: businessman

John Douglas Pridnia (March 16, 1943 – November 17, 2016) was an American politician in the state of Michigan.

Pridnia was born in Detroit, Michigan and attended Macomb Community College and Wayne State University. A Republican, he represented the 106th district in the Michigan House of Representatives from 1989 to 1990 and the 36th District in the Michigan Senate from 1991 to 1994 (36th district). In 2016, it was announced that he had amyotrophic lateral sclerosis (ALS).

Pridnia died on November 17, 2016, aged 73.
