= Matthew Gillard =

American politician (born 1973)

Member of the Michigan House of Representatives from the 106th district
- In office January 1, 2003 – December 31, 2008
- Preceded by: Andy Neumann
- Succeeded by: Andy Neumann

Personal details
- Born: March 9, 1973 (age 53) Alpena, Michigan
- Party: Democratic
- Spouse: Jessica Gillard
- Children: 4

Matthew Gillard (born March 9, 1973) is a politician from the U.S. state of Michigan. He is a Democrat. He formerly represented the 106th District (map), which is located in the north-eastern part of the state. It includes Presque Isle, Alpena, Alcona, Oscoda, Crawford, and Montmorency Counties.

== Early life ==
Gillard was born to Joel and Donna Gillard on March 9, 1973. He went on to graduate from Alpena High School and received a Bachelor of Arts degree from Albion College, and a Juris Doctor from Wayne State University Law School. He was an attorney in the firm of Gillard, Bauer, Mazrum, Florip, Smigelski, and Gulden until he was elected to the State House in 2002. He lives in Alpena with his wife, Jessica, and four children.

== Political career ==
Gillard was elected to the State House in 2002, to succeed outgoing Democratic representative Andy Neumann. He was the vice-chairman of the House Appropriations Committee and he chaired the Judiciary and School Aid and Education Subcommittees. Gillard comfortably won reelections in 2004 and 2006. Term limits prevented him from running for re-election in 2008.
