= Excelsior Township, Michigan =

- Civil township
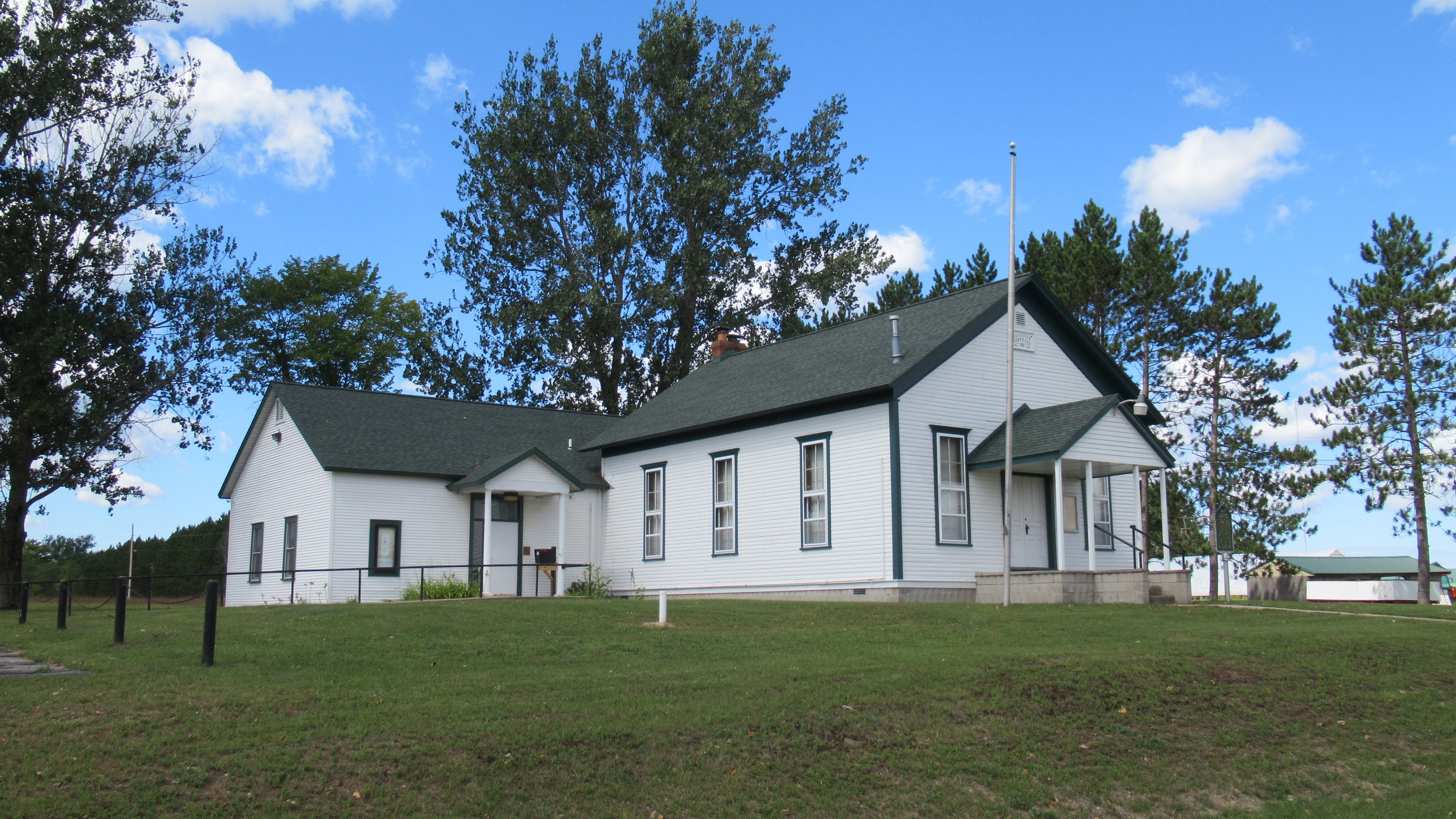
- Excelsior Township Hall

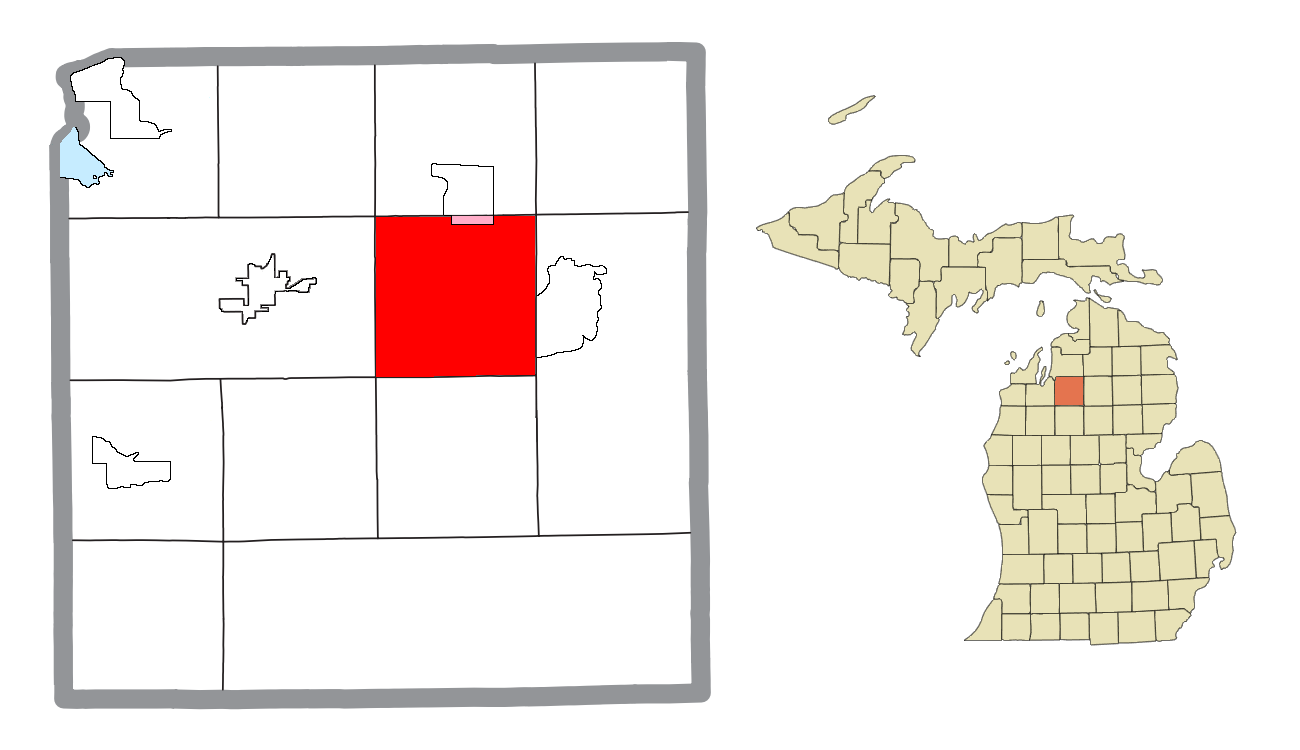
- Location within Kalkaska County (red) and a portion of the administered community of Manistee Lake (pink)

- Location within the state of Michigan Excelsior Township (the United States)
- Coordinates: 44°44′06″N 85°01′20″W
- Country: United States
- State: Michigan
- County: Kalkaska
- Established: 1875

Government
  - Supervisor: Norman Groner
  - Clerk: Annie Wallace

Area
  - Total: 36.22 sq mi (93.8 km^{2})
  - Land: 35.33 sq mi (91.5 km^{2})
  - Water: 0.89 sq mi (2.3 km^{2})
- Elevation: 1,165 ft (355 m)

Population (2020)
  - Total: 991
  - Density: 27/sq mi (10/km^{2})
- Time zone: UTC-5 (Eastern (EST))
  - Summer (DST): UTC-4 (EDT)
- ZIP code(s): 49646 (Kalkaska)
- Area code: 231
- FIPS code: 26-26860
- GNIS feature ID: 1626260
- Website: Official website

Excelsior Township is a civil township of Kalkaska County in the U.S. state of Michigan. The population was 991 at the 2020 census.

The township was established in 1875. Portions of the township are served by the Excelsior Township School District 1, which is one of the last remaining one-room schoolhouses in the state. The current township hall also served as a high school in the past and is listed as a state historic site.

== Communities ==
- Manistee Lake is an unincorporated community and census-designated place with a small portion within the township, while most of the community extends to the north into Coldsprings Township.

== Geography ==
According to the United States Census Bureau, the township has a total area of 36.22 square miles (93.81 km^{2}), of which 35.33 square miles (91.50 km^{2}) is land and 0.89 square miles (2.31 km^{2}) (2.46%) is water.

Excelsior Township contains several lakes, including Crawford Lake, Grass Lake, Lake Five, Perch Lake, Post Lake, and the southernmost portion of Manistee Lake. The north branch of the Manistee River also passes through the township.

M-72 runs east–west through the center of the township.

== Demographics ==
As of the census of 2000, there were 855 people, 328 households, and 245 families residing in the township. The population density was 24.0 inhabitants per square mile (9.3/km^{2}). There were 560 housing units at an average density of 15.7 per square mile (6.1/km^{2}). The racial makeup of the township was 98.60% White, 0.23% African American, 0.58% Native American, 0.23% Asian, and 0.35% from two or more races. Hispanic or Latino of any race were 0.47% of the population.

There were 328 households, out of which 34.1% had children under the age of 18 living with them, 59.8% were married couples living together, 8.8% had a female householder with no husband present, and 25.3% were non-families. 20.4% of all households were made up of individuals, and 6.4% had someone living alone who was 65 years of age or older. The average household size was 2.59 and the average family size was 2.93.

In the township the population was spread out, with 26.9% under the age of 18, 7.0% from 18 to 24, 29.1% from 25 to 44, 22.7% from 45 to 64, and 14.3% who were 65 years of age or older. The median age was 36 years. For every 100 females, there were 111.6 males. For every 100 females age 18 and over, there were 106.3 males.

The median income for a household in the township was $36,932, and the median income for a family was $39,844. Males had a median income of $35,288 versus $20,956 for females. The per capita income for the township was $16,476. About 6.8% of families and 9.0% of the population were below the poverty line, including 16.6% of those under age 18 and 4.6% of those age 65 or over.
