= Coldsprings Township, Michigan =

- Civil township
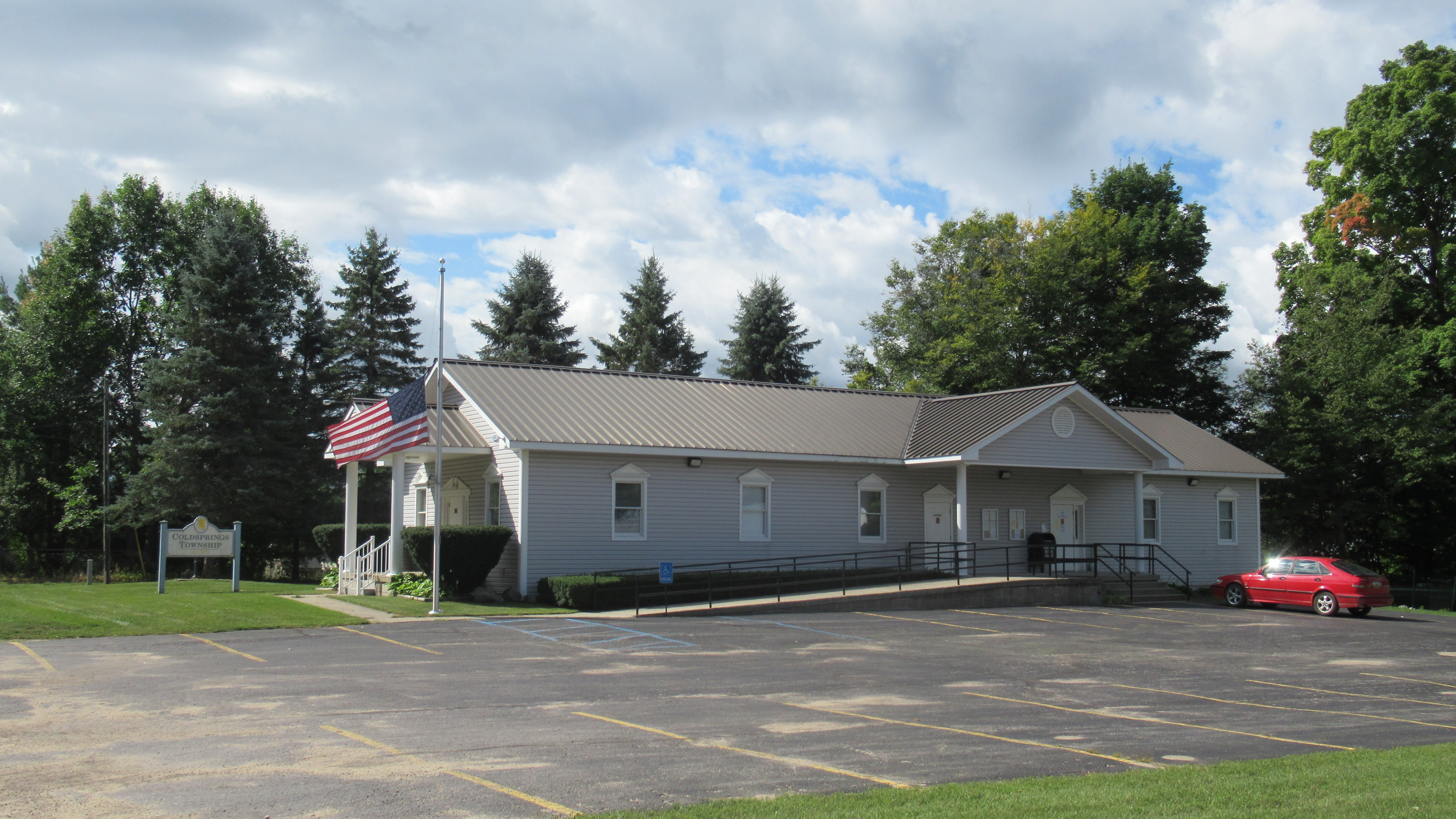
- Coldsprings Township Hall

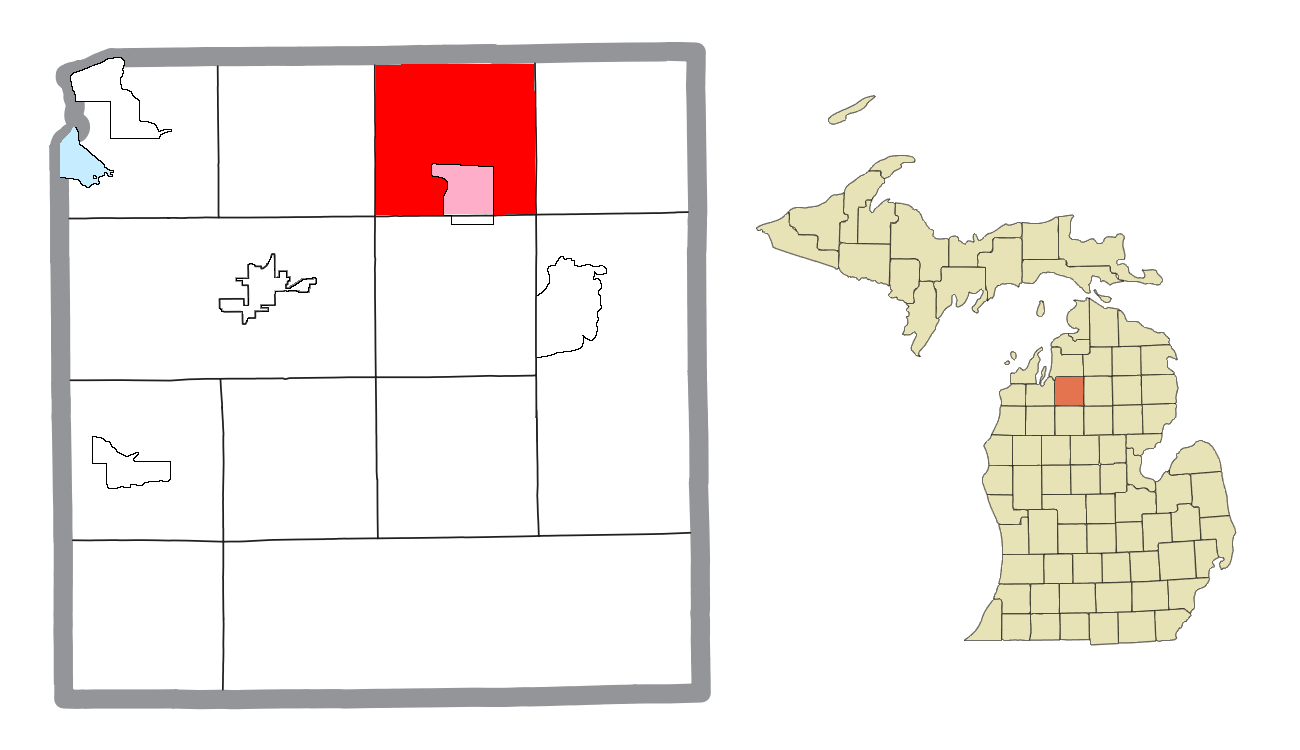
- Location within Kalkaska County (red) and a portion of the administered community of Manistee Lake (pink)

- Location within the state of Michigan Coldsprings Township (the United States)
- Coordinates: 44°48′31″N 85°01′13″W
- Country: United States
- State: Michigan
- County: Kalkaska
- Established: 1873

Government
  - Supervisor: Rick Delaney
  - Clerk: Danielle Stein-Seabolt

Area
  - Total: 36.27 sq mi (93.9 km^{2})
  - Land: 34.51 sq mi (89.4 km^{2})
  - Water: 1.76 sq mi (4.6 km^{2})
- Elevation: 1,273 ft (388 m)

Population (2020)
  - Total: 1,551
  - Density: 42.4/sq mi (16.4/km^{2})
- Time zone: UTC-5 (Eastern (EST))
  - Summer (DST): UTC-4 (EDT)
- ZIP code(s): 49646 (Kalkaska); 49659 (Mancelona)
- Area code: 231
- FIPS code: 26-17000
- GNIS feature ID: 1626106
- Website: Official website

Coldsprings Township is a civil township of Kalkaska County in the U.S. state of Michigan. The population was 1,551 at the 2020 census.

The name "Coldsprings" derives from the natural underground springs located throughout the township.

== Communities ==
- Darragh was a rural postoffice in this township starting in 1902.
- Manistee Lake is an unincorporated community and census-designated place within the township, while a small portion extends to the south into Excelsior Township.

== Geography ==
According to the United States Census Bureau, the township has a total area of 36.27 square miles (93.94 km^{2}), of which 34.51 square miles (89.38 km^{2}) is land and 1.76 square miles (4.56 km^{2}) (4.85%) is water.

The majority of Manistee Lake is within the southern portion of the township.

== Demographics ==
As of the census of 2000, there were 1,449 people, 595 households, and 443 families residing in the township. The population density was 42.1 inhabitants per square mile (16.3/km^{2}). There were 1,349 housing units at an average density of 39.2 per square mile (15.1/km^{2}). The racial makeup of the township was 99.41% White, 0.38% Native American, 0.00% Asian, 0.21% from other races, and 0.00% from two or more races. Hispanic or Latino of any race were 0.00% of the population.

There were 595 households, out of which 24.7% had children under the age of 18 living with them, 66.6% were married couples living together, 5.5% had a female householder with no husband present, and 25.4% were non-families. 20.3% of all households were made up of individuals, and 9.7% had someone living alone who was 65 years of age or older. The average household size was 2.44 and the average family size was 2.78.

In the township the population was spread out, with 20.6% under the age of 18, 6.7% from 18 to 24, 27.0% from 25 to 44, 28.0% from 45 to 64, and 17.7% who were 65 years of age or older. The median age was 42 years. For every 100 females, there were 103.2 males. For every 100 females age 18 and over, there were 107.2 males.

The median income for a household in the township was $33,839, and the median income for a family was $40,132. Males had a median income of $33,313 versus $19,167 for females. The per capita income for the township was $17,396. About 6.5% of families and 8.8% of the population were below the poverty line, including 10.4% of those under age 18 and 5.4% of those age 65 or over.
