= Mullett Township, Michigan =

- Civil township
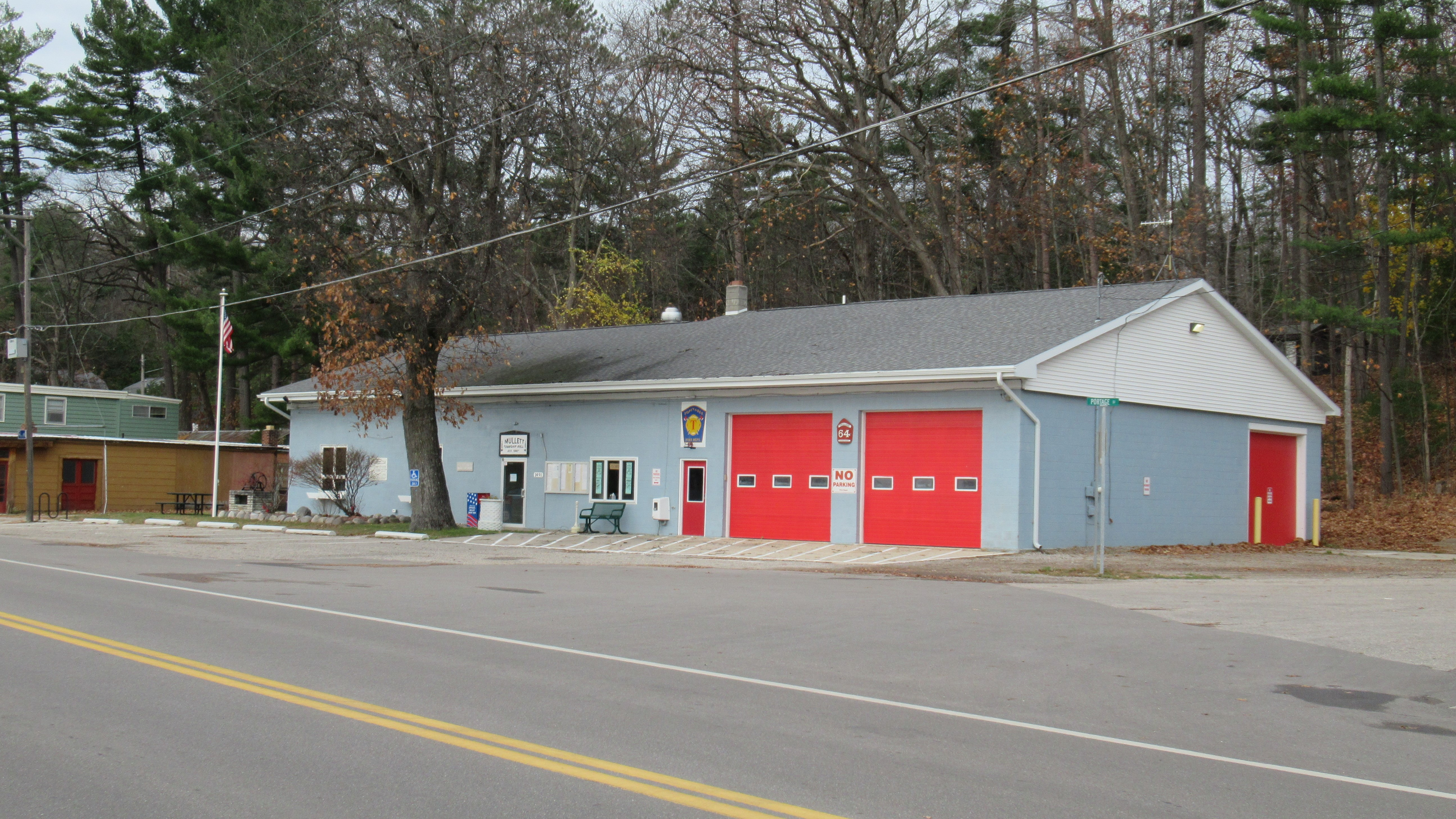
- Mullett Township Hall and fire department along M-27 in the community of Topinabee

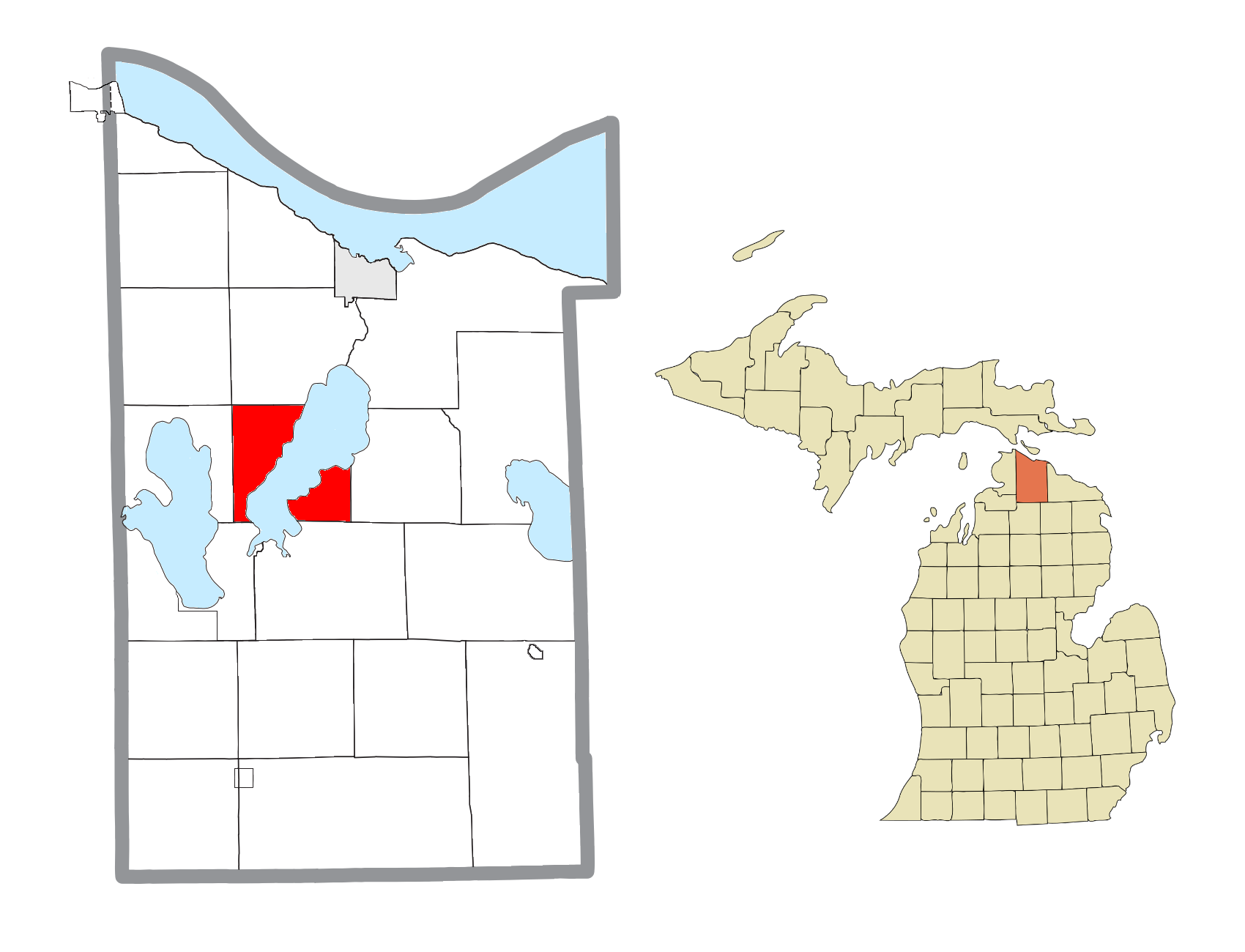
- Location within Cheboygan County

- Location in the state of Michigan Location within the United States
- Coordinates: 45°30′42″N 84°33′28″W
- Country: United States
- State: Michigan
- County: Cheboygan
- Established: 1917

Government
  - Supervisor: Brett Lindgren
  - Clerk: Denise Ackerman

Area
  - Total: 35.70 sq mi (92.46 km^{2})
  - Land: 18.99 sq mi (49.18 km^{2})
  - Water: 16.71 sq mi (43.28 km^{2})
- Elevation: 604 ft (184 m)

Population (2020)
  - Total: 1,236
  - Density: 65.1/sq mi (25.1/km^{2})
- Time zone: UTC-5 (Eastern (EST))
  - Summer (DST): UTC-4 (EDT)
- ZIP code(s): 49721 (Cheboygan); 49749 (Indian River); 49791 (Topinabee)
- Area code: 231
- FIPS code: 26-56100
- GNIS feature ID: 1626778
- Website: Official website

Mullett Township is a civil township of Cheboygan County in the U.S. state of Michigan. The population was 1,236 at the 2020 census. Both the township and Mullett Lake are named for John Mullett, who surveyed much of the area between 1840 and 1843.

When Mullett Township was created by the Michigan Legislature, it was spelled Mullet—a spelling that was widely used in early maps and documents.

== Communities ==
Topinabee is an unincorporated community about 13 miles (21 km) southwest of Cheboygan on the western shore of Mullett Lake at 45°29′02″N 84°35′43″W. Founded in 1881 and 1882, the hamlet was named after the Potawatomi chief Topenebee, who primarily resided in southwestern Michigan.

In addition to the United States Postal Service office, there are two non-denominational Protestant churches, a public library, bar and grille, breakfast cafe, gas station-market, and a rustic furniture store. Mullett Township oversees two public beaches and a public boat-launch on Mullett Lake, as well as a park with baseball field, tennis and basketball court, and playground equipment.

Other named locations in the township include (from south to north) Giauque Beach, Royal Oak Beach, Veery Point, Long Point, Birchwood, and Silver Beach, all on the western shore of Mullett Lake.

== Geography ==
Mullett Township is located west of the geographic center of Cheboygan County and is situated on both sides of Mullett Lake. One must leave the township to go from one side of the lake to the other by land. M-27, North Straits Highway, follows the western shore of the lake and passes through Topinabee. Access to Interstate 75 is just south of the township border, in Tuscarora Township.

According to the United States Census Bureau, the township has a total area of 35.7 square miles (92.5 km^{2}), of which 19.0 square miles (49.2 km^{2}) is land and 16.7 square miles (43.2 km^{2}), or 46.79%, is water, consisting almost entirely of Mullett Lake.

== Demographics ==
As of the census of 2000, there were 1,284 people, 545 households, and 377 families residing in the township. The population density was 67.4 inhabitants per square mile (26.0/km^{2}). There were 1,076 housing units at an average density of 56.5 per square mile (21.8/km^{2}). The racial makeup of the township was 94.00% White, 0.31% African American, 3.74% Native American, 0.08% Asian, and 1.87% from two or more races. Hispanic or Latino of any race were 0.16% of the population.

There were 545 households, out of which 26.8% had children under the age of 18 living with them, 59.4% were married couples living together, 5.7% had a female householder with no husband present, and 30.8% were non-families. 27.7% of all households were made up of individuals, and 14.1% had someone living alone who was 65 years of age or older. The average household size was 2.35 and the average family size was 2.84.

In the township the population was spread out, with 22.5% under the age of 18, 5.1% from 18 to 24, 23.9% from 25 to 44, 26.2% from 45 to 64, and 22.3% who were 65 years of age or older. The median age was 44 years. For every 100 females, there were 95.1 males. For every 100 females age 18 and over, there were 96.3 males.

The median income for a household in the township was $33,438, and the median income for a family was $36,731. Males had a median income of $29,615 versus $20,284 for females. The per capita income for the township was $18,758. About 5.2% of families and 9.4% of the population were below the poverty line, including 15.2% of those under age 18 and 6.2% of those age 65 or over.
