= Inverness Township, Michigan =

- Civil township
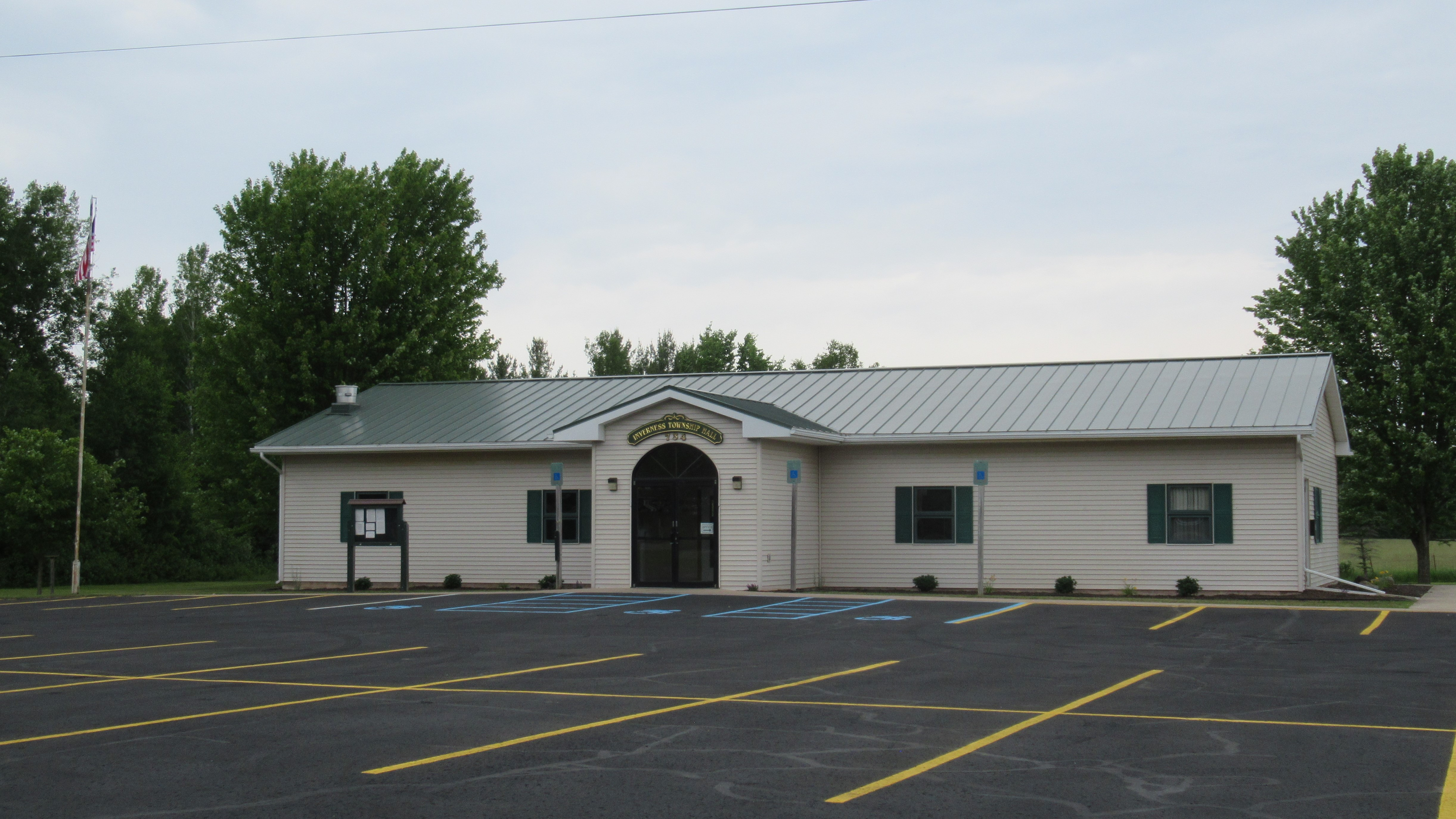
- Inverness Township Hall

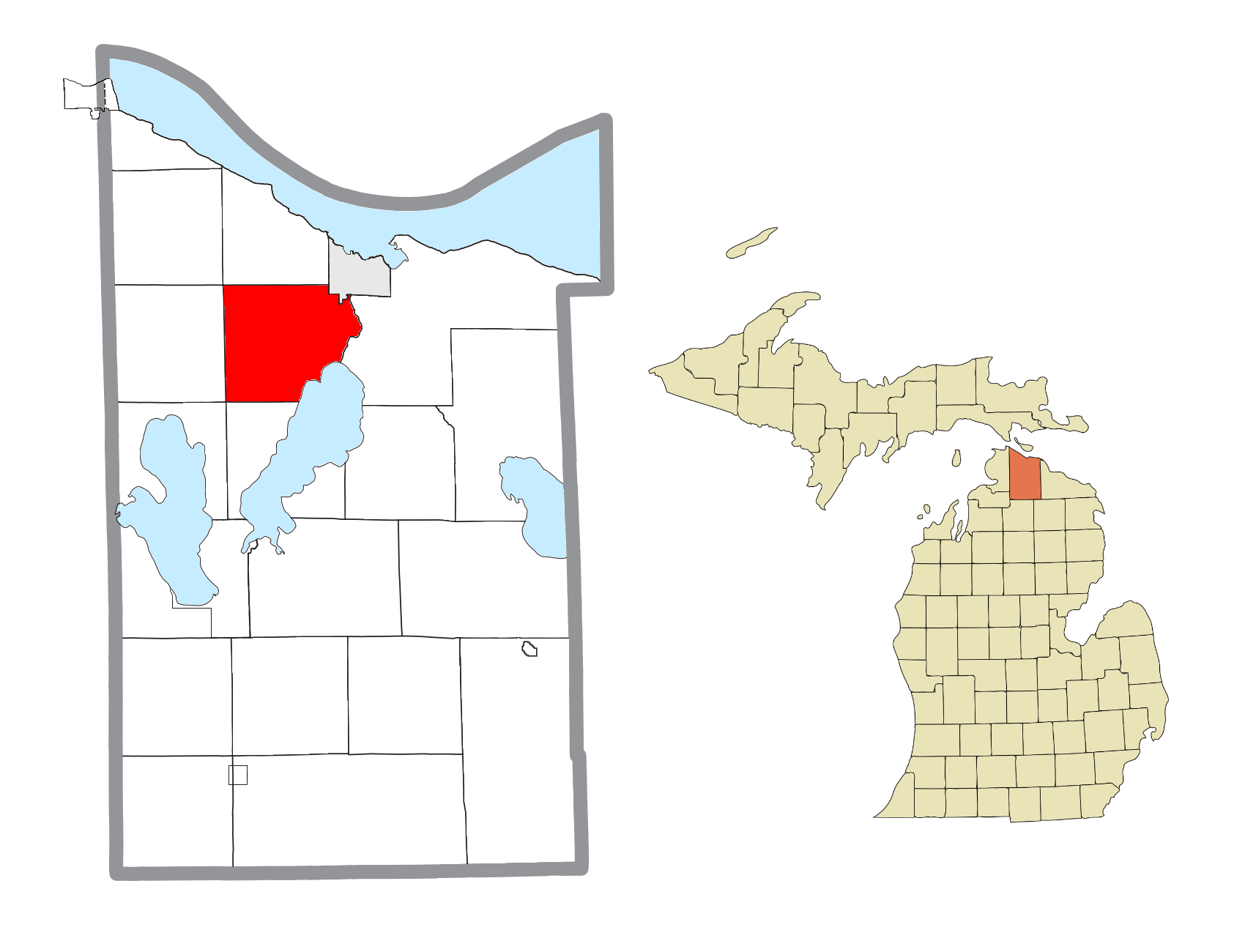
- Location within Cheboygan County

- Location in the state of Michigan Location within the United States
- Coordinates: 45°35′19″N 84°32′37″W
- Country: United States
- State: Michigan
- County: Cheboygan
- Established: 1860

Government
  - Supervisor: Rodney LaHaie
  - Clerk: Jennifer Beebe

Area
  - Total: 37.20 sq mi (96.35 km^{2})
  - Land: 33.86 sq mi (87.70 km^{2})
  - Water: 3.34 sq mi (8.65 km^{2})
- Elevation: 709 ft (216 m)

Population (2020)
  - Total: 2,159
  - Density: 63.8/sq mi (24.6/km^{2})
- Time zone: UTC-5 (Eastern (EST))
  - Summer (DST): UTC-4 (EDT)
- ZIP code(s): 49721 (Cheboygan); 49761 (Mullett Lake)
- Area code: 231
- FIPS code: 26-40820
- GNIS feature ID: 1626519
- Website: Official website

Inverness Township is a civil township of Cheboygan County in the U.S. state of Michigan. The population was 2,159 at the 2020 census. It was named after Inverness in Scotland.

== Communities ==
- Geyersville was the name of a rural post office in Inverness Township during 1877 and 1878.
- Mullett Lake is an unincorporated community on the northwest shore of Mullett Lake at 45°33′43″N 84°31′32″W. It is on M-27, about 6 miles southwest of Cheboygan. The Mullett Lake ZIP code 49761 provides P.O. box only service to the area.
- Riggsville is the name of a community named after the Riggs Family. Justice of the Peace Francis Stead married Lydia Riggs and lived there along with many family members and others.

== Geography ==
Inverness Township is located in northern Cheboygan County and is bordered by the city of Cheboygan, the county seat, on the northeast. The southeast corner of the township is in Mullett Lake. According to the United States Census Bureau, the township has a total area of 37.2 square miles (96.3 km^{2}), of which 33.9 square miles (87.7 km^{2}) is land and 3.4 square miles (8.7 km^{2}), or 8.99%, is water.

== Demographics ==
As of the census of 2000, there were 2,278 people, 914 households, and 659 families residing in the township. The population density was 67.1 inhabitants per square mile (25.9/km^{2}). There were 1,226 housing units at an average density of 36.1 per square mile (13.9/km^{2}). The racial makeup of the township was 95.39% White, 0.04% African American, 2.28% Native American, 0.35% Asian, 0.04% Pacific Islander, and 1.89% from two or more races. Hispanic or Latino of any race were 0.31% of the population.

There were 914 households, out of which 32.7% had children under the age of 18 living with them, 60.0% were married couples living together, 8.4% had a female householder with no husband present, and 27.8% were non-families. 23.2% of all households were made up of individuals, and 9.3% had someone living alone who was 65 years of age or older. The average household size was 2.49 and the average family size was 2.93.

In the township the population was spread out, with 25.1% under the age of 18, 5.8% from 18 to 24, 28.5% from 25 to 44, 26.4% from 45 to 64, and 14.3% who were 65 years of age or older. The median age was 40 years. For every 100 females, there were 97.7 males. For every 100 females age 18 and over, there were 96.4 males.

The median income for a household in the township was $37,121, and the median income for a family was $44,653. Males had a median income of $29,821 versus $19,798 for females. The per capita income for the township was $21,921. About 3.8% of families and 7.9% of the population were below the poverty line, including 8.5% of those under age 18 and 9.3% of those age 65 or over.
