= Richard Friske =

American politician

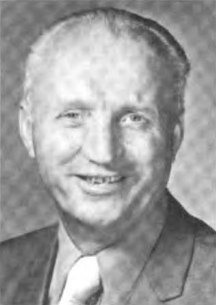

Member of the Michigan House of Representatives from the 106th district
- In office January 1, 1971 – December 31, 1972
- Preceded by: Robert William Davis
- Succeeded by: Mark L. Thompson

Personal details
- Born: June 16, 1923 Second Polish Republic
- Died: June 17, 2002 (aged 79) Banks Township, Michigan, United States
- Party: Republican
- Other political affiliations: American Independent (1972)
- Spouse: Olga Kottke (m. 1950)
- Children: 3, including Neil

Military service
- Allegiance: Germany
- Branch/service: Luftwaffe
- Battles/wars: World War II

Richard W. Friske Sr. (June 16, 1923 – June 17, 2002) was a Michigan politician.

== Early life ==
Friske was born on June 16, 1923, in the Second Polish Republic. He came from a German family, and his father Ferdinand Friske had been deported to internal exile in Siberia by the Russian Empire during World War I.

After Nazi Germany invaded Poland, Friske enlisted in the Luftwaffe during World War II. He later denied any support of Nazism, claiming that his family had been committedly opposed to the ideology and that if he had not joined the Wehrmacht, he would have been forced into the Schutzstaffel.

After ending up in the Soviet occupation zone of Germany at the end of the war, his family moved to the British occupation zone. In 1952, Friske left West Germany with his wife and settled in the Midwestern United States. He initially moved to Racine, Wisconsin, but ultimately settled in Boyne Falls, Michigan. After managing a coal company, he sold it to found the 240-acre farm Friske Orchards near Charlevoix, Michigan. Friske also became a Pentecostal lay minister.

== Career ==
Friske entered politics during the 1968 United States presidential election, when he served as a campaign organizer for George Wallace’s presidential campaign. After appearing on a local Traverse City television station to promote Wallace, he was recruited by the far-right John Birch Society. Friske wrote letters to the Petoskey News-Review opposing the Civil Rights Act of 1964 and school desegregation.

On November 3, 1970, Friske was elected to the Michigan House of Representatives where he represented the 106th district from January 13, 1971, to December 31, 1972. He defeated 10 candidates in the primary, and won because of extensive support from the John Birch Society outside the district despite his views on race and social issues being highly controversial. In his campaign literature, he claimed to be a World War II veteran, without revealing that he had served as a German soldier fighting for the Third Reich.

While serving in the Legislature, Friske supported natalist policies towards the middle-class and population controls for welfare recipients, which he claimed would take the form of abstinence-only sex education. He spoke of the need to "curb the growth of the drone population that weakens our society" He also accused Governor William Milliken of complicity in an “international satanic conspiracy planned for this nation and the world.” He favored religious right policies and opposed abortion rights, the 26th Amendment, and police reform. He alleged that the U.S. public education system had been taken over by socialists. He claimed that “72 to 80 percent” of the U.S. economy had been taken over by Communists as a result of a deliberate conspiracy by Presidents John F. Kennedy, Lyndon B. Johnson, and Richard Nixon. He also argued that they had deliberately prolonged the Vietnam War in order to raise U.S. taxes by supplying North Vietnam through the Polish People's Republic, and that the war could be won in six months.

In 1972, Friske was defeated in the Republican primary for the same position. That same year, Friske ran unsuccessfully for the United States House of Representatives seat representing Michigan's 10th congressional district as an American Independent. Friske went on to be defeated in two more Republican primaries for the Michigan House of Representatives seat representing the 106th district in 1974 and 1976.

== Political donations ==
In 1999, Friske donated $1,000 to the Ku Klux Klan's former Grand Wizard David Duke's campaign in the 1999 Louisiana's 1st congressional district special election.

== Personal life ==
Friske married Olga Kottke on November 11, 1950, in Germany. Friske had three children, Judy, Dick Jr., and Neil Friske. Friske was Pentecostal.

Dick Friske took over the orchards in 1983 and has run it ever since. During the COVID-19 pandemic, he led the orchard in a lawsuit against three Michigan state government agencies and Governor Gretchen Whitmer after the business refused to follow mask mandates. Neil replaced John Damoose in Michigan's 107th House of Representatives district after winning the 2022 Michigan House of Representatives election as a Republican.

== Death ==
Friske died on June 17, 2002, in his home in Banks Township.
