= Frederick Yates =

Frederick Yates may refer to:

- Fred Yates (chess player) (1884–1932), also known as Frederick Dewhurst Yates, English chess master
- Frederick Henry Yates (1797–1842), English actor and theatre manager
- Frederick Yates (politician) (1914–1971), African-American politician and lawyer in Michigan

== See also ==
- Frederic Yates (1854–1919), English painter
- Fred Yates (1922–2008), English artist
