= Daisy Elliott =

American politician and realtor

Daisy L. Elliott

Member of the Michigan House of Representatives from the 8th district
- In office January 1, 1981 – December 31, 1982
- Preceded by: Ed Vaughn
- Succeeded by: Carolyn Cheeks Kilpatrick

Member of the Michigan House of Representatives from the 8th district Wayne County 4th district: 1963–1964 22nd district: 1965–1972
- In office January 1, 1963 – December 31, 1978
- Preceded by: Frederick Yates
- Succeeded by: Ed Vaughn

Member of the 1961–1962 Michigan Constitutional Convention from the Wayne County 4th district
- In office October 1, 1961 – August 1, 1962

Personal details
- Born: Daisy Elizabeth Lenoir; November 26, 1917 Filbert, West Virginia, U.S.
- Died: December 22, 2015 (aged 98) Detroit, Michigan, U.S.
- Party: Democratic
- Profession: Realtor, politician
- Awards: Michigan Women's Hall of Fame; 2016

Daisy L. Elliott (November 26, 1917 – December 22, 2015) was an American politician and realtor from the state of Michigan.

== Early life ==
Elliott was born Daisy Elizabeth Lenoir in Filbert, West Virginia, and resided in Detroit, Michigan. She was a delegate to the 1961–1962 Michigan Constitutional Convention from Wayne County's 4th district, which resulted in Michigan's Constitution of 1963.

== Career ==
A Democrat, she represented Wayne County's 4th district in the Michigan House of Representatives from 1963 to 1964, Michigan's 22nd district, which replaced Wayne County's 4th district, from 1965 to 1972, and Michigan's 8th district from 1973 to 1978. She was an unsuccessful candidate in the primary for the Michigan Senate 5th district in 1978. then regained her old seat in the Michigan House in 1980. In politics, Elliott was nothing if not persistent: she was defeated five times in the primaries for State Representative (the 1st district in 1950, the 11th district in 1954, and the 4th district in 1956, 1958 and 1960) before finally winning in 1962.

While serving in the Michigan State House of Representatives, she co-authored the Elliott-Larsen Civil Rights Act, which passed in 1976, with Melvin L. Larsen.

In April 1982, Elliott was arrested for possessing a stolen 1977 Cadillac. She was defeated by Carolyn Cheeks Kilpatrick in the Democratic primary that year, and, after numerous appeals, had her conviction upheld in 1984. She served sixty days in jail before being released in June 1985.

== Political career ==
She was a member of Democratic Party, National Association for the Advancement of Colored People (NAACP), League of Women Voters, and Junior League.

== Death and legacy ==
She died on December 22, 2015, aged 98, at DMC Sinai-Grace Hospital in Detroit. She is interred at Woodlawn Cemetery near the Rosa L. Parks Freedom Chapel.

In 2016, she was inducted into the Michigan Women's Hall of Fame. On June 30, 2020, the Lewis Cass Building in Lansing was renamed the Elliott-Larsen Building in honor of Larsen and Elliot.

Preceded by Frederick Yates (D)	State Representative for Wayne County's 4th district 1963–1964	Succeeded by Replaced with Michigan's 22nd district
Preceded by Created from Wayne County's 4th district	State Representative for Michigan's 22nd district 1965–1972	Succeeded by Gary M. Owen (D)
Preceded by James Bradley (D)	State Representative for Michigan's 8th district 1973–1978	Succeeded by Ed Vaughn (D)
Preceded by Ed Vaughn (D)	State Representative for Michigan's 8th district 1981–1982	Succeeded by Carolyn Cheeks Kilpatrick (D)
