= Lee Chatfield =

American politician from Michigan (born 1988)

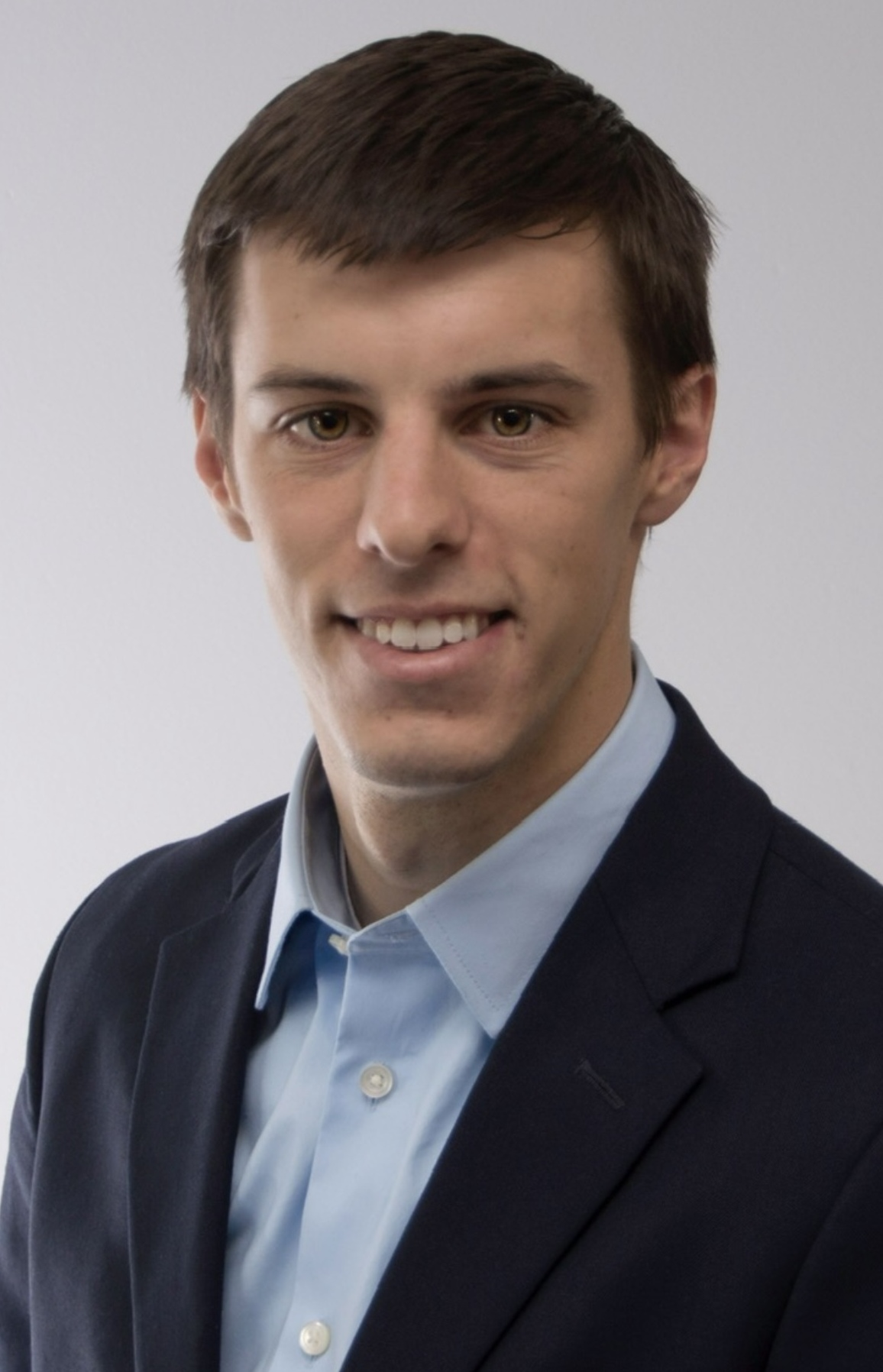

76th Speaker of the Michigan House of Representatives
- In office January 9, 2019 – January 1, 2021
- Preceded by: Tom Leonard
- Succeeded by: Jason Wentworth

Speaker pro tempore of the Michigan House of Representatives
- In office January 11, 2017 – January 9, 2019
- Preceded by: Tom Leonard
- Succeeded by: Jason Wentworth

Member of the Michigan House of Representatives from the 107th district
- In office January 1, 2015 – January 1, 2021
- Preceded by: Frank Foster
- Succeeded by: John Damoose

Personal details
- Born: Lee Roberson Chatfield; May 25, 1988 (age 38)
- Party: Republican
- Spouse: Stephanie Zondervan
- Children: 5
- Education: Northland International University (BA); Liberty University (MPA)

Lee Roberson Chatfield (born May 25, 1988) is an American former politician and a Republican former member of the Michigan House of Representatives. He was first elected from the 107th House district in 2015. He was speaker pro tempore from 2017 to 2019, and speaker of the Michigan House of Representatives from 2019 to 2021.

In April 2024 he was charged with thirteen felony counts of embezzlement, larceny and conspiracy involving spending private foundation and state money for personal use while he was Speaker of the Michigan House.

== Education and career before politics ==
Chatfield received a bachelor's degree from Northland International University, an unaccredited, now defunct Baptist college in Wisconsin, and a master's degree from Liberty University online. Before his election to the state House in 2014, he worked at a Christian school in northern Michigan operated by his father, a minister. Chatfield was a teacher, coach and athletic director at the school.

== Michigan House of Representatives ==
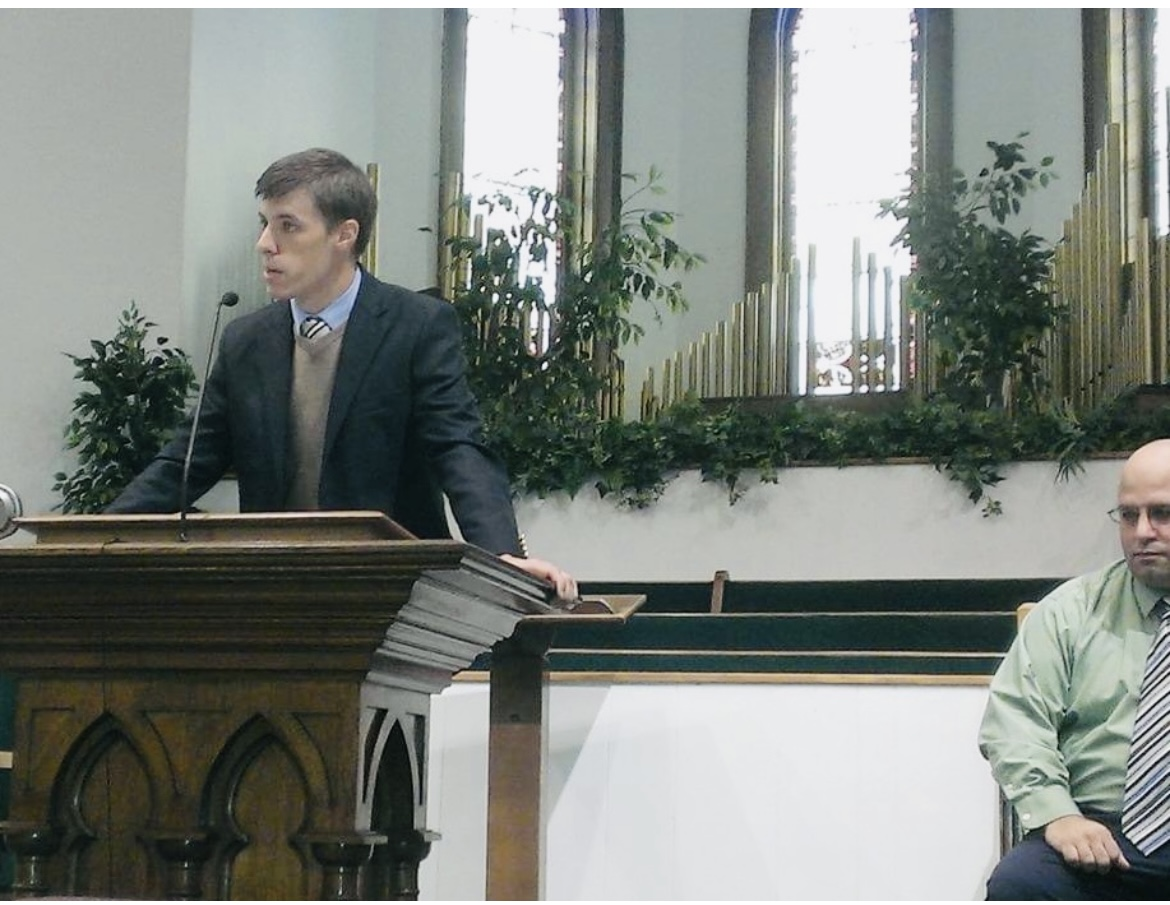
Lee Chatfield preaches a sermon.

Chatfield was first elected to the Michigan House of Representatives in 2014, after defeating a Republican incumbent, Frank Foster, in the primary election. Chatfield criticized Foster for supporting Medicaid expansion and for supporting an extension of Michigan's Elliott-Larsen Civil Rights Act to prohibit discrimination on the basis of sexual orientation in housing and employment.

Chatfield took office in 2015. He was re-elected to the state Legislature in 2016 with 67 percent of the vote, and in 2018, with over 58 percent of the vote.

=== Speakership ===
Chatfield was speaker of the state House from 2019 to 2020. Elected at age 30; he was believed to be the youngest House speaker in recent memory. Legislators assuming the role of House Speaker in Michigan at age 30 or younger are as follows: Kinsley Bingham at age 29 in 1838, Alfred Hanscom at age 26 in 1845, Byron Stout at age 27 in 1857, Sullivan Cutcheon at age 29 in 1863, Daniel Markey at age 29 in 1887, William Tateum at age 30 in 1889, and Gilbert Currie at age 30 in 1913.

During Chatfield's tenure as speaker of the House, Michigan had divided government, with both chambers of the legislature controlled by Republicans, but with a Democratic governor (Gretchen Whitmer). Chatfield and the Senate Majority Leader Mike Shirkey both repeatedly clashed with Whitmer over issues such as the state budget, road funding, auto insurance legislation, and criminal justice legislation.

As speaker, Chatfield presided over the passage of a bipartisan auto insurance bill that allowed motorists to choose their level of personal injury protection coverage. However, proposed road infrastructure improvements became mired in deadlock, with Chatfield rejecting a proposal by Whitmer to fund road repairs by raising the gas tax by 45 cents. Negotiations for long-term road funding broke down, and Legislature passed a bill without support from Whitmer's administration. Whitmer signed the bill, but with 147 line-item vetoes plus several administrative transfers.

Chatfield and Shirkey both opposed Whitmer's actions to use a government shutdown on business during COVID.

== Controversies ==
=== Firearms security violation ===
In 2018, Chatfield attempted to bring a loaded, unregistered handgun onto a commercial flight at Pellston Regional Airport. He was fined $250 for failure to register his handgun, which he had purchased in December 2015. He also paid a $1,960 fine assessed by the Transportation Security Administration. Chatfield had previously introduced a bill in the Michigan House of Representatives to make handgun registration voluntary.

=== Role in 2020 presidential election ===
Chatfield was a strong supporter of President Donald Trump. Chatfield, along with Michigan Senate Majority Leader Mike Shirkey, met with Trump on November 20, 2020, as Trump and his campaign attempted to overturn the results of the presidential election, in which Trump was defeated by Joe Biden (both nationally and in Michigan). Paul Mitchell, the U.S. representative for Michigan's 10th congressional district, said that the purpose of the meeting may have been to discuss the appointment of pro-Trump electors to the U.S. Electoral College. Despite pressure from Trump, Chatfield ultimately declined to support passage of a Michigan Legislation to pass a resolution purporting to retroactively change Michigan's slate of electors for Trump, saying that such a move "would bring mutually assured destruction for every future election in regards to the Electoral College" and "we would lose our country forever."

=== Allegations of sexual assault and financial impropriety ===
Initial allegations that Chatfield sexually abused a high school student at a school where he taught led to multiple financial and corruption charges against Chatfield and his wife, though no sexual abuse charges were filed.

On January 6, 2022, The Detroit News reported Michigan State Police were investigating Chatfield over allegations that he sexually abused a girl for 12 years, beginning in 2009 when she was between 14 and 15 years old and continuing until 2021. When she was 18 she married Aaron Chatfield, Lee's brother. Lee Chatfield has admitted having an affair with his sister-in-law and with other women, but said that these affairs were between consenting adults.

The sexual abuse is alleged to have begun when the girl was attending Chatfield's church, Northern Michigan Baptist Bible Church, and continued while she was a student at the school associated with the church, where Chatfield taught physical education.

Michigan Attorney General Dana Nessel charged Chatfield and his wife with financial crimes in April 2024, alleging they misappropriated political campaign finance accounts for personal travel, housing and other benefits.

== Post legislative career ==
Due to term limits, Chatfield was ineligible to run for another term in the Michigan House of Representatives. In mid-February 2021, after leaving office, Chatfield was appointed as the new CEO of Southwest Michigan First, a privately funded economic development organization covering the seven counties of southwest Michigan (Berrien, Branch, Calhoun, Cass, Kalamazoo, St. Joseph and Van Buren).

Chatfield's hiring caused a backlash due to Chatfield's past stances in opposition to LGBTQ rights. Various groups including the City of Kalamazoo and the Kalamazoo Promise, pulled support from Southwest Michigan First.

Following the backlash from his hiring, Southwest Michigan First and Chatfield stated that they would support expanding the state's civil rights act (the Elliott-Larsen Civil Rights Act) to prohibit discrimination based on sexual orientation and gender identity, a stance that the Southwest Michigan First board had voted in 2017 to support. During his tenure in the Michigan House, Chatfield had opposed such an expansion, which he viewed as an infringement on religious freedom. A few days after beginning his new job, Chatfield resigned, citing the controversy.

== Personal life ==
Chatfield has four sons and one daughter.

Michigan House of Representatives
| Preceded by Tom Leonard | Speaker pro tempore of the Michigan House of Representatives; 2017–2019 | Succeeded by Jason Wentworth |
Political offices
| Preceded by Tom Leonard | Speaker of the Michigan House of Representatives; 2019–2021 | Succeeded by Jason Wentworth |
