= Pat Gagliardi =

American politician

The Honorable Patrick M. Gagliardi

Member of the Michigan House of Representatives from the 107th district
- In office January 1, 1983 – December 31, 1998
- Preceded by: Charles H. Varnum
- Succeeded by: Scott Shackleton

Personal details
- Born: December 14, 1950 (age 75) Bay City, Michigan
- Party: Democratic
- Education: Lake Superior State College (B.A., sociology)

Patrick M. "Pat" Gagliardi was a Democratic member of the Michigan House of Representatives from 1983 through 1998. He served as Democratic floor leader from 1989 until he left the House.

Born in December 1950 in Bay City, Gagliardi graduated from Midland High School and pursued a degree in sociology from what was then called Lake Superior State College. While at LSSC, Gagliardi met Mitch Irwin. The two won elections in 1978, Gagliardi to the Chippewa County Board of Commissioners and Irwin to the Michigan Senate.

Following his retirement from the Legislature, Gagliardi became head of the Lake Superior State University Foundation. Governor Jennifer M. Granholm appointed him to the Michigan Liquor Control Commission in 2003, where he served until 2011. His papers were deposited with Northern Michigan University.
