= Gary McDowell =

American politician

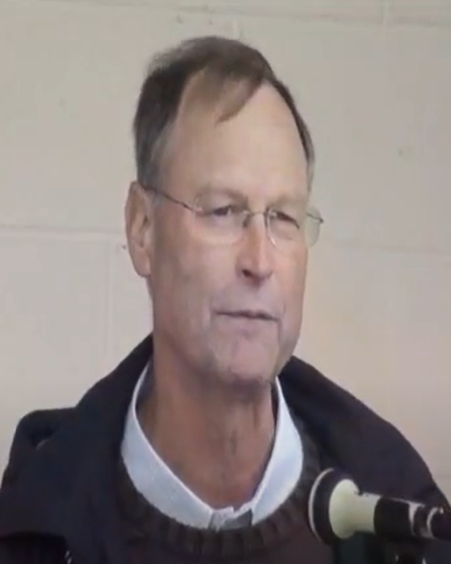

Member of the Michigan House of Representatives from the 107th district
- In office January 1, 2005 – December 31, 2010
- Preceded by: Scott Shackleton
- Succeeded by: Frank Foster

Personal details
- Born: April 21, 1952 (age 74) Rudyard, Michigan
- Party: Democratic
- Spouse: Carrie McDowell
- Website: Michigan State Representative Gary McDowell

Gary J. McDowell (born April 21, 1952) is a U.S. politician from the state of Michigan. He was elected to three, two-year terms in the Michigan House of Representatives and served from January 1, 2005, until January 1, 2011. In 2010 and 2012, he was the Democratic nominee for Michigan's 1st congressional district against Republican Dan Benishek. Prior to serving in the Michigan House of Representatives, McDowell was a member of the Chippewa County Board of Commissioners for 22 years. He also served on the Chippewa County Economic Development Corporation Board of Directors from 1987 until 2004. McDowell is the incumbent Director of the Michigan Department of Agriculture and Rural Development since 2019.

== Early life, education, and early career ==
McDowell was born and raised on a farm in Rudyard, Michigan. He is the oldest of ten children. His father was a John Deere salesman and a hay broker. His mother was a homemaker. He graduated from Rudyard High School in 1970 and attended Lake Superior State University.

In addition to being a farmer, he was also a United Parcel Service delivery driver for 23 years. He was a volunteer firefighter and emergency medical technician for 18 years.

== Michigan House of Representatives ==
=== Elections ===
In 2002, he ran for Michigan's 107th House District, challenging incumbent Republican Scott Shackleton. He lost 69 percent to 31 percent. In 2004, Shackleton was term-limited from the Legislature and McDowell decided to run again. He defeated Walter North, a former member of the state Senate, 54 percent to 46 percent.

In 2006, he won re-election to a second term by defeating Republican Jay Duggan 59 percent to 41 percent. In 2008, he won re-election to a third and final term defeating Republican Alex Strobehn 65 percent to 35 percent.

=== Tenure ===
McDowell introduced 98 bills in six years in the Legislature. He has missed a total of 96 votes.

=== Committee assignments ===
2009

- House Committee on Appropriations
  - Community Health subcommittee (Chairman)
  - Agriculture subcommittee (Vice Chairman)
  - Higher Education subcommittee

== Congressional elections ==
=== 2010 ===
McDowell faced Benishek, independent Glenn Wilson, Libertarian nominee Keith Shelton, Green nominee Ellis Boal, and UST nominee Patrick Lambert in the general election. Democratic incumbent Bart Stupak had announced his retirement, leaving this an open seat.

=== 2012 ===
On September 15, 2011, McDowell announced his intent to run against Benishek in the 2012 election. He has been endorsed by the AFL-CIO and the Blue Dog Coalition. McDowell lost his bid to defeat Benishek for a second straight election, losing to the freshman incumbent by less than 2,000 votes of over 347,000 that were cast. McDowell considered challenging Benishek for a third time in the 2014 elections, but ultimately declined.

== Personal life ==
McDowell lives in Rudyard with his wife Carrie. They have three daughters, Alivia, Emily and Rochelle, two grandsons, Garrett and Bruin, and one granddaughter, Shiloh. He is a member of the Rudyard First Presbyterian Church.
