= Parker Fairbairn =

American politician

Member of the Michigan House of Representatives from the 107th district
- Incumbent
- Assumed office January 1, 2025
- Preceded by: Neil Friske

Personal details
- Born: March 23, 1999 (age 27) Petoskey, Michigan
- Party: Republican
- Education: Northwood University

Parker Fairbairn is an American politician from Michigan who has represented the 107th district in the Michigan House of Representatives since 2025. A member of the Republican Party, Fairbairn defeated then-incumbent representative Neil Friske in the primary, before going on to defeat Democrat Jodi Decker in the general election.

Prior to his election, he was a manager at a used car dealership and was a member of Emmet County Brownfield Redevelopment Authority and was also the chair of the Republican Party for the County. Prior to his successful 2024 campaign he ran for the same district in 2022, losing to Friske in the primary.
