= 1978 Michigan Secretary of State election =

- November 7, 1978
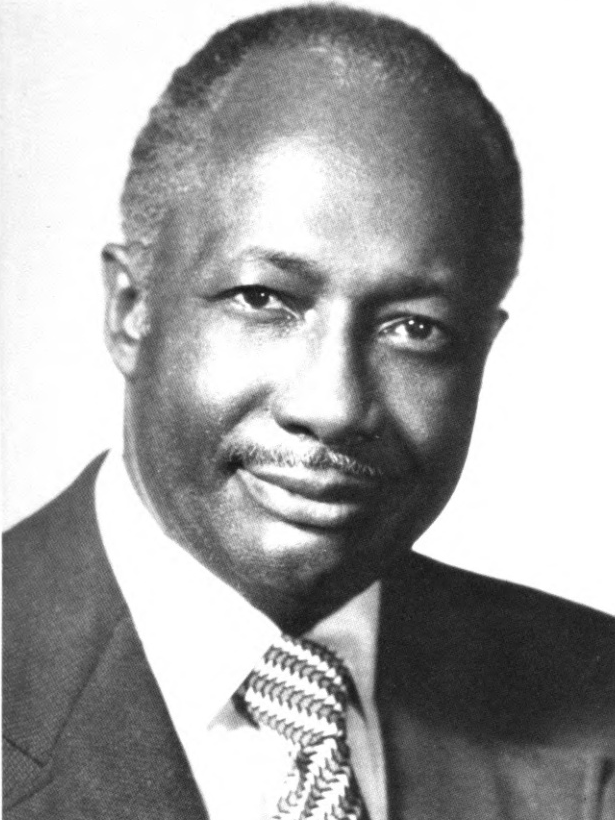

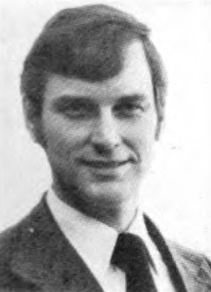
Nominee	Richard H. Austin	Melvin L. Larsen
Party	Democratic	Republican
Popular vote	1,833,854	962,588
Percentage	65.57%	34.42%
Secretary of State before election
Richard H. Austin
Democratic
Elected Secretary of State
Richard H. Austin
Democratic

The 1978 Michigan Secretary of State election was held on November 7, 1978. Incumbent Democrat Richard H. Austin defeated Republican nominee Melvin L. Larsen with 65.57% of the vote.

Larsen conceded the election early, before 10% of the return votes were counted.

== General election ==
=== Candidates ===
Major party candidates

- Richard H. Austin, Democratic
- Melvin L. Larsen, Republican

=== Results ===
Michigan Secretary of State election, 1978
Party	Candidate	Votes	%
Democratic	Richard H. Austin (incumbent)	1,833,854	65.57
Republican	Melvin L. Larsen	962,588	34.42
Write-ins		186	0.01
Total votes		2,796,628	100
Democratic hold			
