= Bank of Malvern =

- U.S. National Register of Historic Places
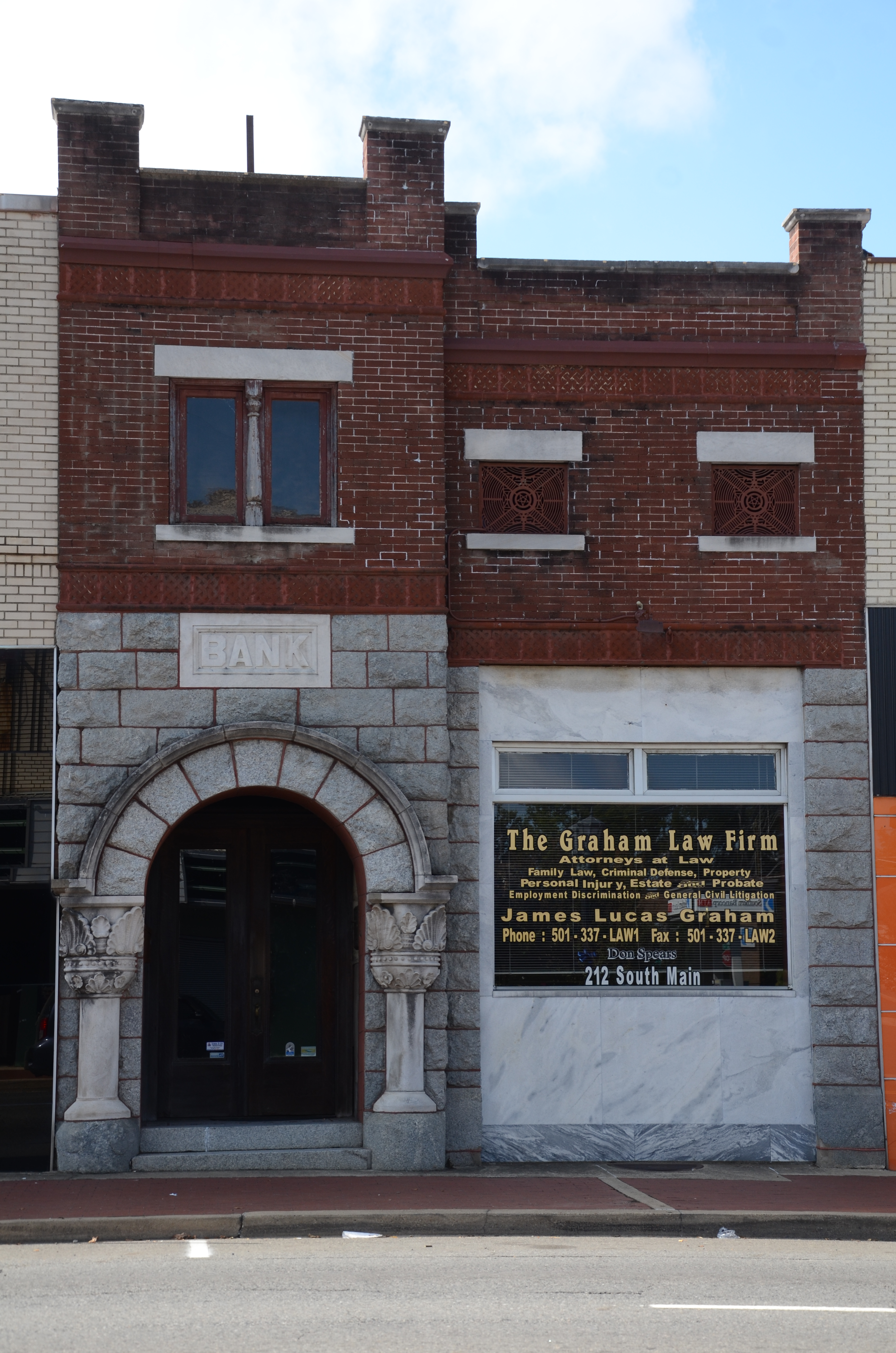

- Location within Arkansas Location within the United States
- Location: 212 S. Main St., Malvern, Arkansas
- Coordinates: 34°21′48″N 92°48′49″W
- Area: less than one acre
- Built: 1889
- Architectural style: Romanesque, Richardsonian Romanesque
- NRHP reference No.: 87000425
- Added to NRHP: March 13, 1987

The Bank of Malvern is a historic commercial building at 212 South Main Street in Malvern, Arkansas. It is a single-story masonry structure, sharing party walls with neighboring buildings in downtown Malvern. Its lower level is Romanesque in style, with rusticated stone forming an entrance arch on the left, and acting as a piers around the glass display window on the right. Above this is a lighter brick construction, with bands of decorative terra cotta rising to a parapet. The building was constructed in 1889, and its upper portion rebuilt in 1896 following a fire. It is a relatively rare example of Romanesque architecture in the state.

The building was listed on the National Register of Historic Places in 1987.

== See also ==
- National Register of Historic Places listings in Hot Spring County, Arkansas
