= Elliott-Larsen Building =

- State Office Building
- U.S. National Register of Historic Places
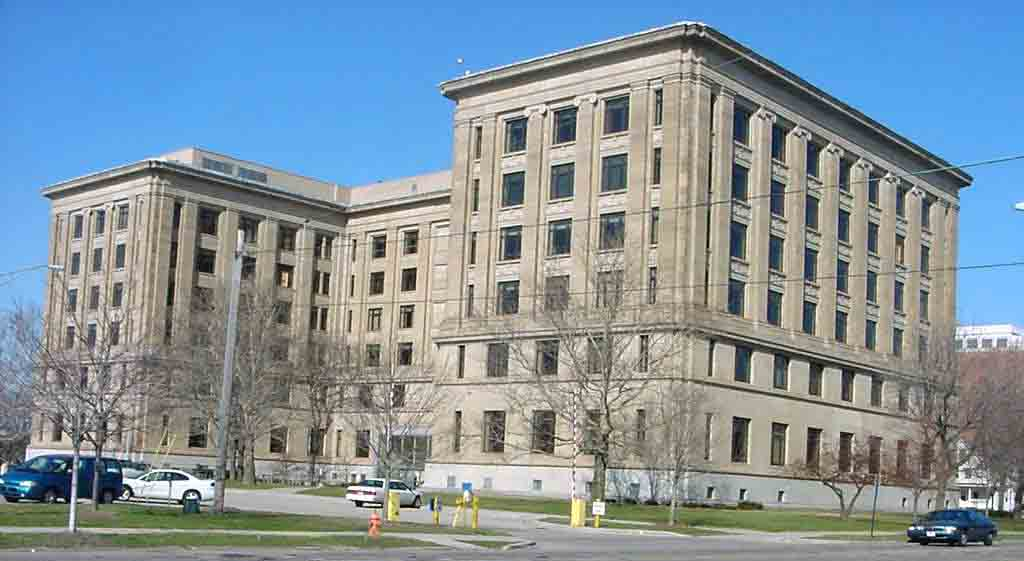

- Location within Michigan Location within the United States
- Interactive map
- Location: 320 S. Walnut St., Lansing, Michigan
- Coordinates: 42°43′50″N 84°33′28″W
- Area: 2 acres (0.81 ha)
- Built: 1919
- Architect: Edwyn Albert Bowd
- Architectural style: Classical Revival
- NRHP reference No.: 84001432
- Added to NRHP: May 17, 1984

The Elliott-Larsen Building is a state government office in downtown Lansing, Michigan, named after Democratic State Representative Daisy Elliott and Republican State Representative Melvin Larsen, primary sponsors of the Elliott-Larsen Civil Rights Act. It was formerly known as the Lewis Cass Building, named after territorial governor Lewis Cass. It is the Michigan state government's oldest standing office building. The building was added to the National Register of Historic Places as "State Office Building" in 1984.

== History ==
The first state office building in Lansing was constructed in 1853; this was replaced with another building in 1872 and demolished the following year. By the 1910s, the state realized the need for a new office building, and funds were appropriated beginning in 1917 for a new structure. Architect Edwyn A. Bowd of Lansing was commissioned to design the building, and plans were approved in 1918. Construction commenced in 1919 on the Classical Revival style building, and was completed in 1921.

On February 8, 1951, the building was intentionally set on fire by a state office employee. The following morning, part of the seventh floor collapsed down to the next level, which destroyed a large number of state historical records. In the reconstruction, the seventh floor was removed.

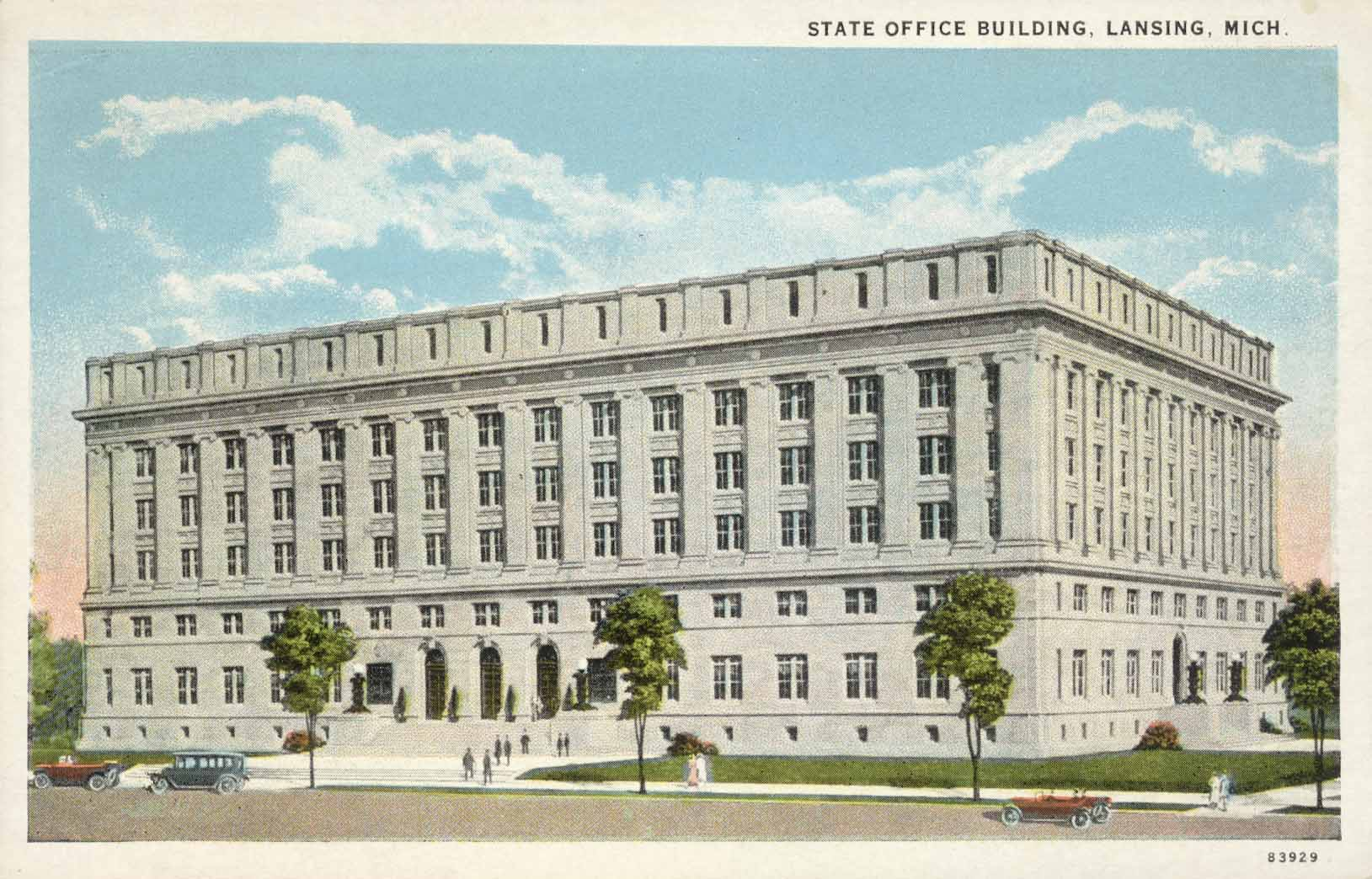
Postcard depicting the Elliott-Larsen building with its seventh floor, circa 1922

The building served as the primary state office building until the completion of the first part of a new state government complex in 1953. The building remains in use by the state.

On June 30, 2020, Gov. Gretchen Whitmer announced the renaming of the building as the Elliott-Larsen Building in honor of Daisy Elliott and Melvin L. Larsen, the lawmakers who sponsored Michigan's bipartisan civil rights law of 1976.

== Description ==
The Elliott-Larsen Building is a six-story (originally seven-story) U-shaped Classical Revival structure with a flat roof, with a facade of cream-colored sandstone above a granite basement. A cornice separates the second and third floors, forming a base for four-story pilasters with Tuscan capitals above. An entablature with cornice runs above the pilasters. As originally built, the building had three arched entrances. After the 1951 fire, two entrances were removed, and the main entrance completely rebuilt as a projecting gray granite entryway.

== Government agencies ==
State of Michigan government agencies located in Elliot-Larsen Building:

- Department of Technology, Management and Budget
- Department of Health & Human Services
- Department of Labor and Economic Opportunity
