= Elliott-Larsen Civil Rights Act =

Michigan state law

Michigan Legislature
- Long title: Public Act 453 of 1976
- Territorial extent: Michigan
- Enacted by: Michigan Legislature
- Signed by: Michigan Governor William Milliken
- Signed: January 13, 1977
- Effective: March 31, 1977
- Introduced by: Daisy Elliott and Melvin L. Larsen

Amended by
- Act 162 of 1977, Act 153 of 1978, Act 446 of 1978, Act 610 of 1978, Act 91 of 1979, Act 93 of 1980, Act 170 of 1980, Act 202 of 1980, Act 45 of 1982, Act 512 of 1982, Act 11 of 1991, Act 70 of 1992, Act 124 of 1992, Act 258 of 1992, Act 216 of 1993, Act 88 of 1995, Act 202 of 1999, Act 348 of 2006, Act 190 of 2009 and Acts 6, 31 and 45 of 2023

Summary
- An Act to define civil rights; to prohibit discriminatory practices, policies, and customs in the exercise of those rights based upon religion, race, color, national origin, age, sex, sexual orientation, gender identity, height, weight, familial status, or marital status; to preserve the confidentiality of records regarding arrest, detention, or other disposition in which a conviction does not result; to prescribe the powers and duties of the civil rights commission and the department of civil rights; to provide remedies and penalties; to provide for fees; and to repeal certain acts and parts of acts.

Keywords
- Civil rights, discrimination, housing, employment, public accommodations
- Status: Amended

The Elliott-Larsen Civil Rights Act (ELCRA), or Public Act 453 of 1976, which went into effect in 1977, originally prohibited discrimination in Michigan only on the basis of "religion, race, color, national origin, age, sex, height, weight, familial status, or marital status" in employment, housing, education, and access to public accommodations. A ruling by the Michigan Supreme Court on July 28, 2022 expanded the scope of the law to explicitly include protections for LGBT people. Sexual orientation and gender identity were both formally codified and added to Michigan legislation officially on March 16, 2023 and became Act 6 of 2023. Other classes added to the law since passage include pregnant workers, workers who seek abortions, and hair style and texture.

The law is named for its two primary sponsors, Daisy Elliott, a Democrat from Detroit, and Melvin L. Larsen, a Republican from Oxford, and passed in 1976 with 25 votes in the Michigan Senate and 79 votes in the Michigan House of Representatives. It was signed into law by Michigan Governor William Milliken on January 13, 1977 and went into effect on March 31, 1977.

The law also helped strengthen the role of the Michigan Department of Civil Rights, formed in 1965 to support the work of the Michigan Civil Rights Commission of the 1963 Constitution of Michigan.

== History ==
The Elliott-Larsen Civil Rights Act was passed in 1976, signed into law by Michigan Governor William Milliken on January 13, 1977, and went into effect on March 31, 1977. It has been amended directly or indirectly over 20 times.

=== Prior protections ===
In 1885, Michigan adopted the Public Act 130 of 1885, otherwise known as the Civil Rights Act, which stated “all persons within the jurisdiction of (the state) shall be entitled to full and equal accommodations, advantages, facilities, and privileges of inns, restaurants, eating-houses, barber shops, public conveyances on land and water, theatres, and all other places of public accommodation and amusement”. In 1890, the Michigan Supreme Court in Ferguson v. Gies relied on the Civil Rights Act in holding the “separate but equal” doctrine unconstitutional under Michigan law, over 60 years before the Supreme Court of the United States case of Brown v. Board of Education. In 1927, the Civil Rights Act survived constitutional challenge in Bolden v. Grand Rapids Operating Corporation.

In the years following Bolden v. Grand Rapids Operating Corporation, Michigan passed additional civil rights laws prohibiting discrimination in public accommodations, housing, and employment. The progression of the state’s laws reached a new pinnacle when civil rights were given constitutional status in Michigan's Constitution of 1963, which also resulted in the formation of the Michigan Civil Rights Commission.

=== Passage ===
After attempting in 1966 to pass a Michigan version of the federal civil rights law that was adopted in 1964, Michigan State Representative Daisy Elliott was told by the leadership of her political party, the Democrats, that her measure would never pass unless she found a Republican to co-sponsor it. After being newly elected, Michigan State Representative Melvin L. Larsen, a Republican from Oxford, indicated in 1973 that he would co-sponsor the law. Larsen served on the Michigan House of Representatives civil rights committee that would hold hearings and vote on the proposed legislation. Larsen has stated that his Catholic faith and experience as a principal, athletic director, football coach and instructor at one of the Pontiac Catholic schools was what motivated him to support anti-discrimination measures.

The act was modeled on prior state civil rights laws prohibiting discrimination in public accommodations, employment, and housing but considerably extended the reach of their application and broadened the forms of discrimination prohibited.

When proposed by Elliott and Larsen in 1973, the legislation faced opposition from the disabled (referred to as "handicappers" at the time) and LGBT communities because it did not include protections for members of those communities. Elliott and Larsen indicated that the legislation was meant to focus on the African American community. When the bill passed three years later, it was believed that adding "sexual orientation" would prevent the bill from passing, so it was left out. Elliott and Larsen made the decision to proceed with the final bill after Elliott offered to add Larsen's name to the bill and consulted him on the final effort to pass the bill in 1976. Most issues raised by the disabled community were also addressed in 1976 with the passage of the Michigan’s Persons with Disabilities Civil Rights Act.

It passed with 25 votes in the Michigan Senate and 79 votes in the Michigan House of Representatives, and was signed into law by Governor William Milliken on January 13, 1977. The law went into effect on March 31, 1977.

=== Effort to add protections for LGBTQ people ===
As early as the 1973 committee hearing on the Elliott-Larsen Civil Rights Act, members of the LGBT community in Michigan sought to be included in the law. In 1983, Republican state representative Jim Dressel co-sponsored House Bill 5000, which would have added "sexual orientation" to the list of protected characteristics; Dressel – who later came out as gay – was defeated for re-election the following year. Michigan's first openly LGBTQ state legislator, Chris Kolb, included such a change in two other pro-LGBT bills—none of which passed.

Since then, a number of additional bills have been introduced to add protections for the LGBTQ community. Most recently, bills to add sexual orientation, gender identity, and gender expression — Senate Bill 4 and House Bill 4003 — were introduced on Jan. 12, 2023 by State Senator Jeremy Moss and State Representative Laurie Pohutsky, respectively. Moss is the first out gay Senator in Michigan history and Pohutsky is the first out bisexual woman to serve in the Michigan legislature. The issue is one of six legislative priorities for 2023 that were unveiled by Democrats in the House, Senate and Governor's Office. The bill was passed out of the legislature by the House on March 8, and was signed into law by Governor Gretchen Whitmer on March 16. Larsen, at 86 years old, attended the signing in support, saying: "the original intent was and still is that every citizen has the right to be protected under the Elliott-Larsen Civil Rights Act.”

Although Democrats have introduced legislation amending ELCRA for many consecutive years, the last time there was significant movement — even so much as a hearing — on any bill was 2014. Then-State Representative Sam Singh, a Democrat, had introduced legislation that was inclusive of both sexual orientation and gender identity. Another bill which only included sexual orientation was introduced by Republican State Representative Frank Foster, but did not receive support from the LGBTQ community or progressives, as the bill left out members of the transgender community and did not adequately protect lesbian, gay, or bisexual people from discrimination. Both bills received a hearing before the Michigan House Commerce Committee, but neither bill received a committee vote.

The Michigan Supreme Court, citing the Supreme Court of the United States' decision in Bostock v. Clayton County, ruled in Rouch World, LLC. v. Department of Civil Rights that discrimination on the basis of sexual orientation or gender identity "necessarily constitutes discrimination because of sex" under ELCRA. This ruling extended the protections of the act to members of the LGBTQ+ community. The decision was codified by the passage of Act 6 of 2023 on March 16, 2023, which took effect on March 31, 2024 or 91 days after sine die.

=== Other amendments ===
The Elliott-Larsen Civil Rights Act has been amended directly or indirectly nearly 20 times to refine the law, its enforcement, and add protections for groups or classifications not originally named in the act such as height and weight. In 2009, Governor Jennifer Granholm signed Public Act 190 of 2009, an amendment that increased employment protections for pregnant workers. In 2023, Whitmer signed an amendment extending the act to protect those who choose to have abortions from employment retaliation.

In 2019 and subsequent sessions, legislation was introduced to add protections against discrimination on the basis of hair style and texture. The legislation, also known as the Michigan CROWN Act, was passed by the legislature on June 8, 2023 and signed into law on June 15.

== Honors and recognition ==
The State Bar of Michigan recognized the law at the 37th Legal Milestone dedication on August 28, 2012, at the Michigan State Capitol in Lansing.

On June 30, 2020, the Lewis Cass Building in Lansing was renamed the Elliott-Larsen Building in honor of the law's sponsors.

== See also ==
- LGBT rights in Michigan
- Law of Michigan
- Michigan Civil Rights Initiative
