= William McLaughlin (politician) =

American politician from Michigan (born 1932)

Chair of the Michigan Republican Party
- In office 1969–1979
- Preceded by: Elly M. Peterson
- Succeeded by: Melvin L. Larsen

Personal details
- Born: William F. McLaughlin
- Party: Republican
- Profession: Politician

William F. McLaughlin (born 1932) was an American politician from the State of Michigan.

McLaughlin resided in St. Clair Shores and Northville, Michigan. Prior to working as a party operative McLaughlin had an insurance business. He was a candidate for the Michigan State House of Representatives from Macomb County 2nd District in 1962 and a delegate to Republican National Convention from Michigan in 1964.

He was Vice-chairman of the Michigan Republican Party in 1965 and later elected Chairman of the Michigan Republican Party from 1969-1979 tying Gerrit J. Diekema for ten consecutive years of service.

Party political offices
Preceded by Elly M. Peterson	Chairman of the Michigan Republican Party; 1969– 1979	Succeeded by Melvin L. Larsen
