= Hot Spring County Courthouse =

- U.S. National Register of Historic Places
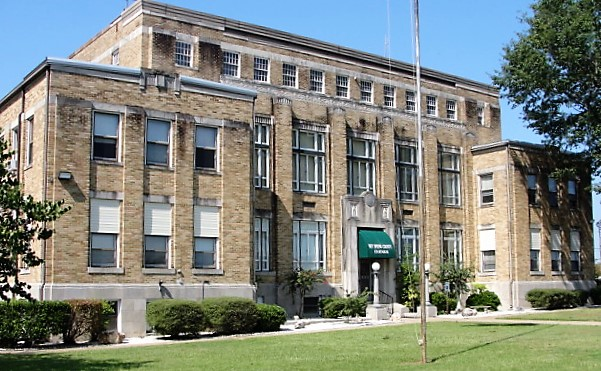
- Main façade of the County Courthouse

- Location within Arkansas
- Interactive map showing the location of Hot Spring County Courthouse
- Location: 210 Locust St., Malvern, Arkansas
- Coordinates: 34°21′46″N 92°48′53″W
- Area: less than one acre
- Built: 1936 (90 years ago)
- Architect: Charles L. Thompson
- Architectural style: Art Deco
- MPS: Thompson, Charles L., Design Collection TR
- NRHP reference No.: 96001271
- Added to NRHP: November 7, 1996

The Hot Spring County Courthouse is located at 210 Locust Street in Malvern, the county seat of Hot Spring County, Arkansas.

The Hot Spring County Courthouse is a 2 1/2-story frame structure, its exterior clad in brick. It is an H-shaped structure, with slightly projecting end wings and a central connecting section, where the main entrance is located. The bays of the central section are articulated by brick pilasters, with the building otherwise exhibiting a restrained Art Deco styling. The building was designed by Arkansas architect Charles L. Thompson, and was built in 1936. It is the only significant example of Art Deco architecture in the county. The building was listed on the National Register of Historic Places in 1996.

== See also ==
- National Register of Historic Places listings in Hot Spring County, Arkansas
