= Melvin L. Larsen =

American politician

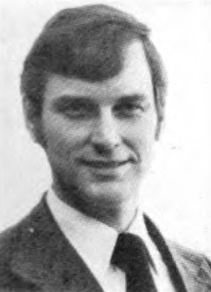

38th Chairman of the Michigan Republican Party
- In office 1979–1981
- Preceded by: William McLaughlin
- Succeeded by: Spencer Abraham

Member of the Michigan House of Representatives from the 61st district
- In office January 1, 1973 – December 31, 1978
- Preceded by: Loren D. Anderson
- Succeeded by: Alice Tomboulian

Personal details
- Born: October 19, 1936 (age 89) Clinton, Iowa, U.S.
- Party: Republican

Melvin L. Larsen (born October 19, 1936) is an American politician from the State of Michigan.

He was born in Clinton, Iowa, and later resided in Oxford, Oakland County, Michigan. Larsen was a member of the Michigan State House of Representatives 61st District, 1973–1978 and a candidate for Michigan Secretary of State in 1978. He was elected Chairman of the Michigan Republican Party from 1979 to 1981. In 1976, he was one of the authors of the Elliott-Larsen Civil Rights Act of Michigan, alongside fellow Representative Daisy Elliott. This was a major anti-discrimination law in Michigan and touched upon fair housing, age discrimination, and sex discrimination. Currently, Melvin Larsen is President of Larsen & Associates of Southfield, Michigan.

On June 30, 2020, the Lewis Cass Building in Lansing was renamed the Elliott-Larsen Building in honor of Larsen and Elliott.

Party political offices
Preceded by N. Lorraine Beebe	Republican nominee for Michigan Secretary of State; 1978	Succeeded by Elizabeth A. Andrus
Preceded by William F. McLaughlin	Chairman of the Michigan Republican Party; 1979– 1981	Succeeded by E. Spencer Abraham
