= Charles H. Varnum =

American politician

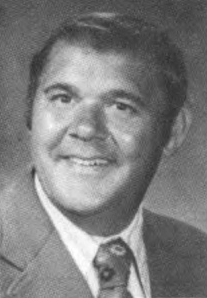

Member of the Michigan House of Representatives from the 107th district
- In office January 1, 1967 – December 31, 1982
- Preceded by: Einar E. Erlandsen
- Succeeded by: Pat Gagliardi

Personal details
- Born: July 9, 1933 Jonesville, Michigan, U.S.
- Died: February 26, 1999 (aged 65) Cleveland, Ohio, U.S.
- Party: Republican
- Spouse: Sherry
- Education: Northern Michigan University; Hillsdale College

Military service
- Allegiance: United States
- Branch/service: Marine Corps
- Rank: Sergeant
- Battles/wars: Korean War

Charles Henry Varnum (July 9, 1933 – February 26, 1999) was a Republican member of the Michigan House of Representatives, representing a portion of the Upper Peninsula for 26 years.

A native of Jonesville, Varnum attended Ferris Institute and Hillsdale College. While at Hillsdale, Varnum became a member of Delta Tau Delta. He served in the Marines during the Korean War. Varnum then moved to Manistique and was a teacher, a member of the Schoolcraft County board of supervisors, and a member of the Manistique city council. He was elected to the House in 1966.

After leaving the House in 1982, Varnum became Manistique city manager and served there until his retirement in 1988. He was a member of Rotary, the Elks, the American Legion, and the V.F.W. Varnum died on February 26, 1999, aged 65.
