= Neil Friske =

American politician from Michigan

Member of the Michigan House of Representatives from the 107th district
- In office January 1, 2023 – January 1, 2025
- Preceded by: John Damoose (redistricting)
- Succeeded by: Parker Fairbairn

Personal details
- Born: July 18, 1961 (age 65) Petoskey, Michigan
- Party: Republican
- Children: 4
- Parent: Richard Friske

Kornelius Wolfram "Neil" Friske Jr. (born July 18, 1961) is an American politician from Charlevoix, Michigan who represented the 107th district in the Michigan House of Representatives from 2023 until 2025.

Friske is pro-life and is a member of the National Rifle Association of America.

== 2024 arrest and primary loss ==
On June 20, 2024, Friske was arrested in Lansing, with police requesting sexual assault, assault, and a weapons offense as charges. In the August 2024 Republican primary election, Friske was defeated in his bid for re-nomination, losing to Parker Fairbairn.

Friske has not been charged with a crime; the Ingham County Prosecutor conducted an investigation and handed over the case to the Office of the Michigan Attorney General in September 2024. He denies any wrongdoing.

== January 6th ==
In 2022, Progress Michigan reported that images captured during the January 6 United States Capitol attack at the Capitol in Washington, D.C. appear to show Friske attending the event.

== See also ==
- Official website
