= Malvern, Arkansas =

- City
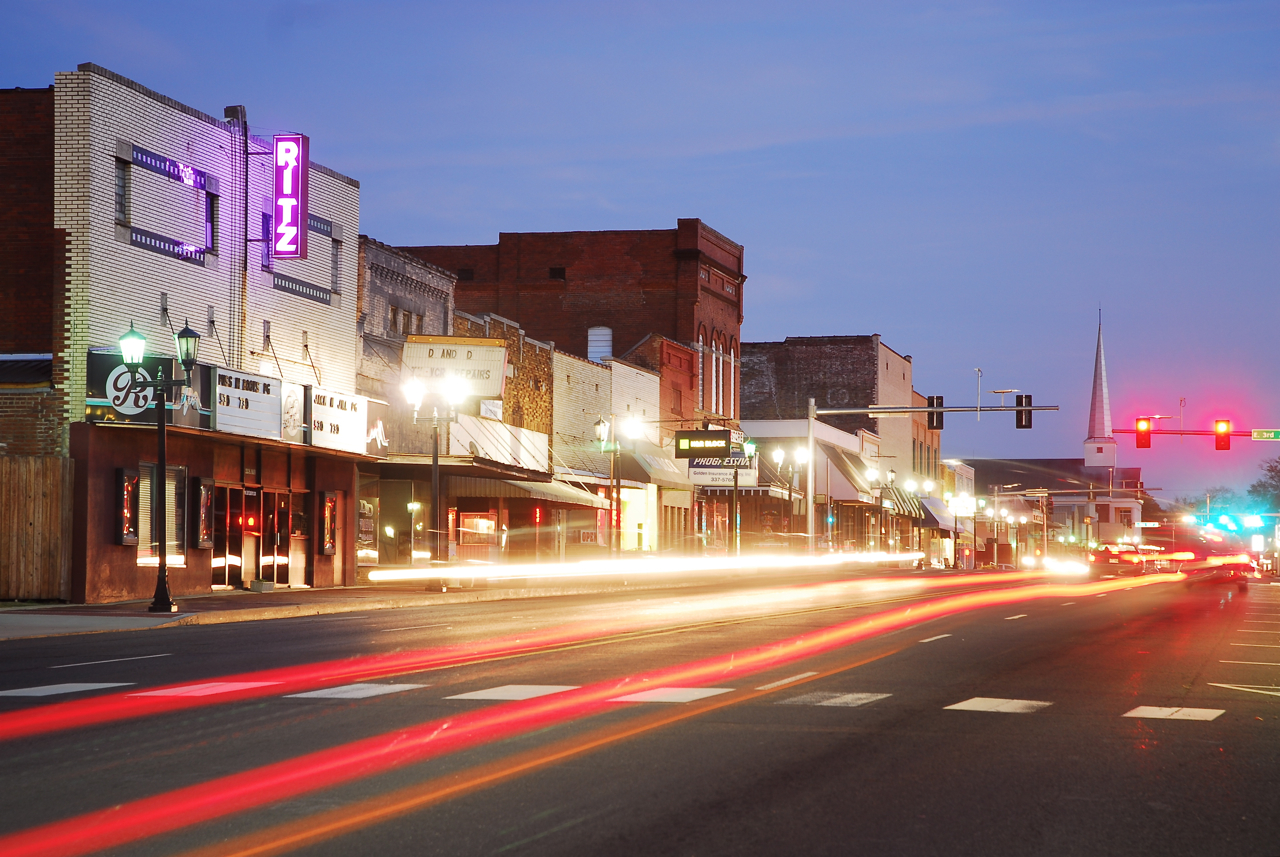
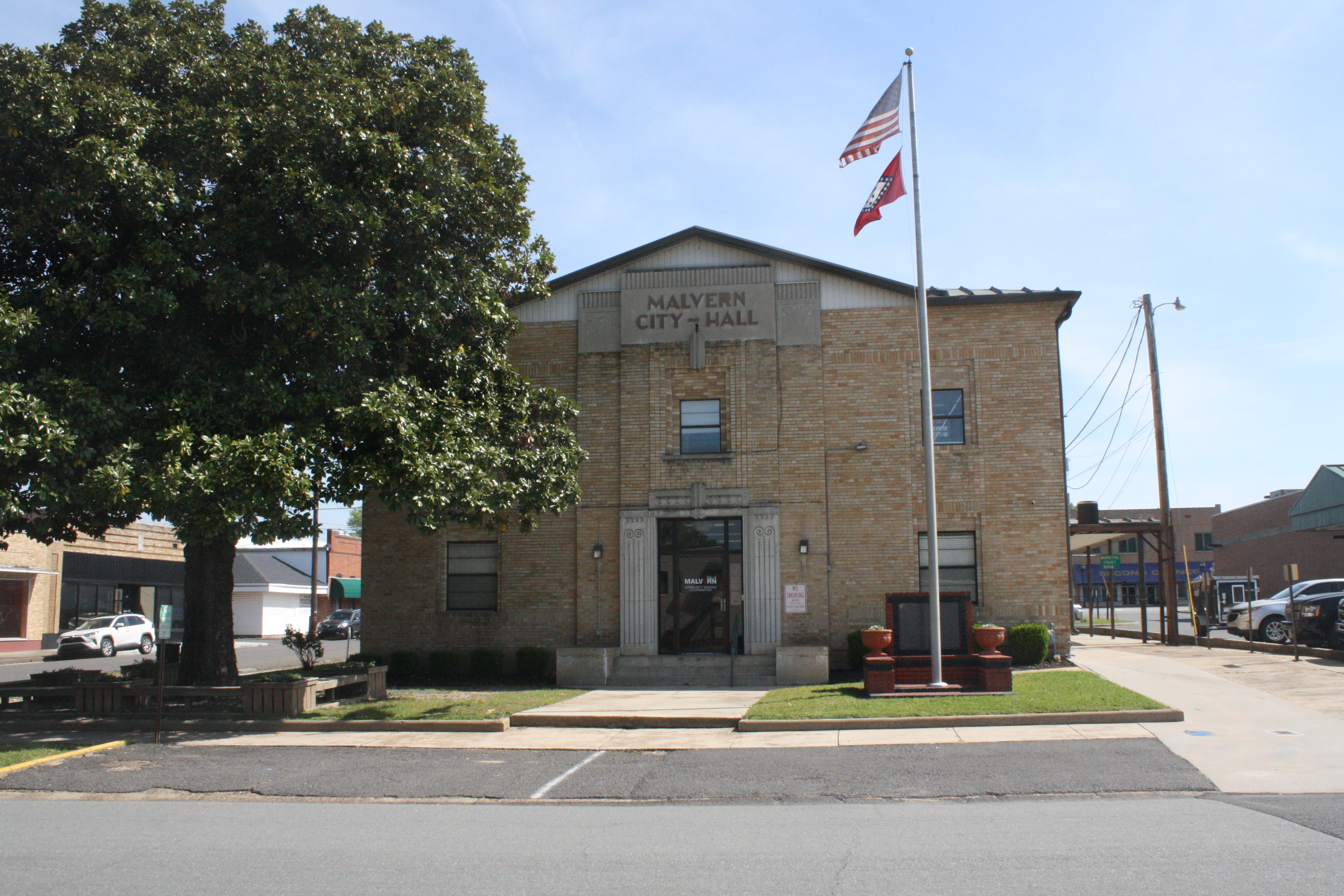
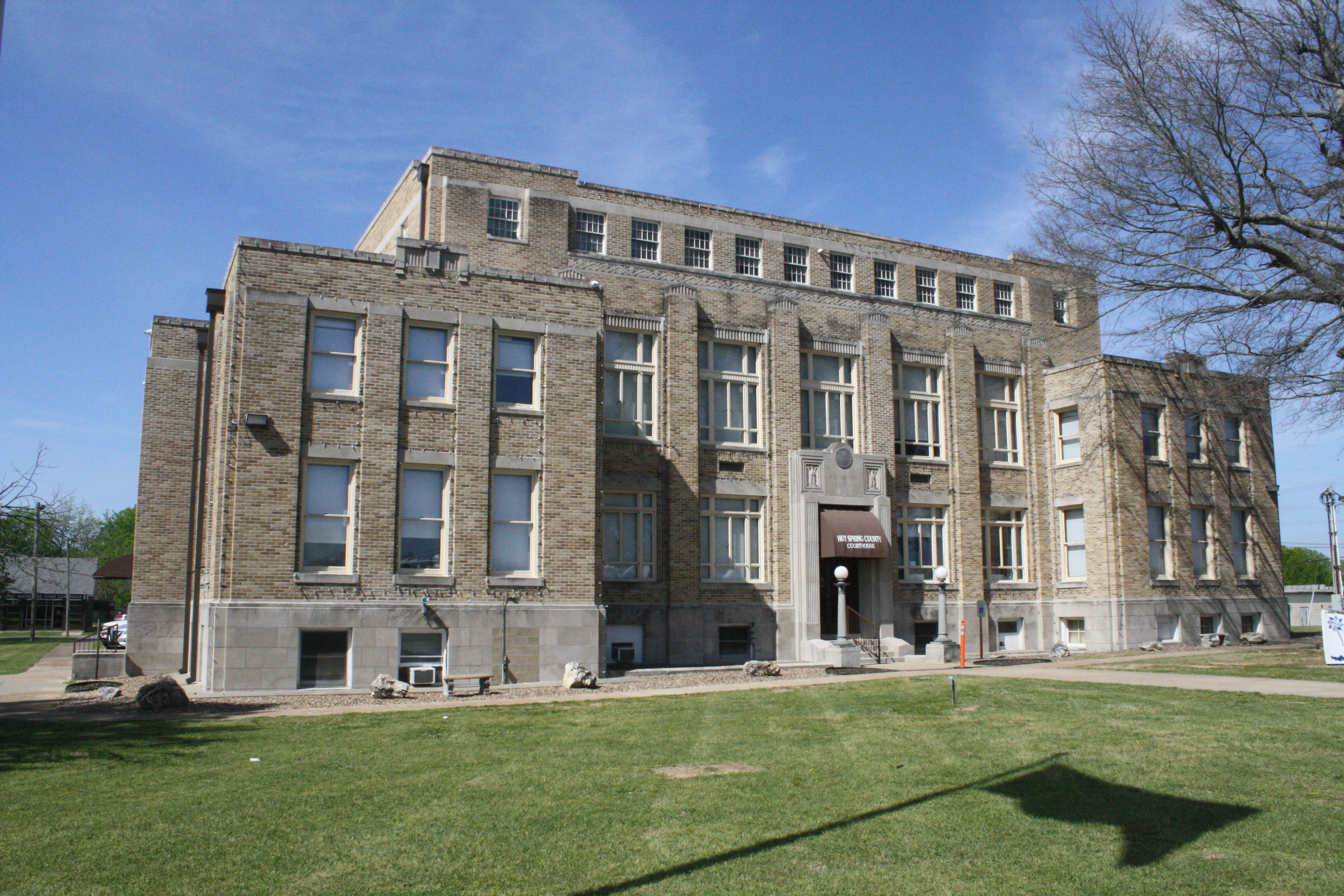
- Malvern Commercial Historic District City Hall Hot Spring County Courthouse
- Nickname: Brick Capital of the World
- Location of Malvern in Hot Spring County, Arkansas.

- Location within the contiguous United States of America
- Coordinates: 34°21′50″N 92°48′39″W
- Country: United States
- State: Arkansas
- County: Hot Spring
- Townships: Butterfield, Fenter
- Incorporated: July 22, 1876
- Named for: Malvern Hill, Virginia

Government
  - Type: Mayor–Council
  - Council: Malvern City Council

Area
  - Total: 9.92 sq mi (25.69 km^{2})
  - Land: 9.86 sq mi (25.55 km^{2})
  - Water: 0.054 sq mi (0.14 km^{2})
- Elevation: 315 ft (96 m)

Population (2020)
  - Total: 10,867
  - Estimate (2025): 11,144 ▲
  - Density: 1,101.7/sq mi (425.38/km^{2})
- Time zone: UTC-6 (Central (CST))
  - Summer (DST): UTC-5 (CDT)
- ZIP code: 72104
- Area code: 501
- FIPS code: 05-43610
- GNIS feature ID: 2405001
- Major airport: Adams Field (LIT)
- Website: malvernar.gov

Malvern is a city in and the county seat of Hot Spring County, Arkansas, United States. Founded as a railroad stop at the eastern edge of the Ouachita Mountains, the community's history and economy have been tied to available agricultural and mineral resources. The production of bricks from locally available clay has earned the city the nickname, "The Brick Capital of the World". As of the 2020 census, Malvern had a population of 10,867.

== History ==
Named after Malvern Hill, Virginia, Malvern was founded in 1870 by the Cairo and Fulton Railroad as a city site 21 miles (34 km) southeast of Hot Springs. On October 15, 1878, Malvern officially became the county seat of Hot Spring County. The original inhabitants of the county were Native Americans, trappers, hunters, and farmers.

The Hot Springs Railroad, often referred to as the Diamond Jo line, was established as a narrow-gauge railroad by Chicago businessman Joseph Reynolds in 1874. Reynolds began building the Hot Springs Railroad, which extends northwest from Malvern Junction, a station on the Cairo & Fulton, to Hot Springs, after he had endured unsatisfactory stagecoach rides to the latter city. Because Malvern was the closest railroad station to Hot Springs, it became an important junction point for passengers transferring from rail to stagecoach to complete their journey to the spas in Hot Springs. The stagecoach route was infamous for robberies. This was the only railroad into Hot Springs for 15 years. The opening of the Little Rock & Hot Springs Western Railroad in April 1900 provided a more direct access to Hot Springs from Little Rock and the north, and both the Choctaw, Oklahoma & Gulf and the Iron Mountain took advantage of this route, effectively cutting the volume of interchange traffic into Malvern. By 1902 passenger train shuttle service through Malvern had essentially ended.

The Malvern Police Department lost Carson Smith, the deputy, and three officers in the line of duty, all shot to death during the 1930s. They were Clyde Davis, Leslie Lee Potts, and Hiram Potts. Davis and Leslie Lee Potts were both shot during a domestic dispute on April 21, 1933, a shootout in which they killed the suspect. Hiram Potts, who was related to Leslie Lee Potts, was shot and killed during his March 4, 1935, attempt to arrest two men who were boarding a train illegally.

During World War II, hundreds of Malvernites moved to the Los Angeles area to take advantage of work in the shipyards—apparently spurred by a couple of residents who found work there and wrote home boasting of 88-cent/hour jobs, which was a decent wage for the time.

== Geography ==
Malvern is in northeastern Hot Spring County, southeast of the Ouachita River where it exits the Ouachita Mountains. It is bordered to the north by Rockport and to the east by Perla.

Interstate 30 passes through the northwest part of Malvern, with access from Exits 97, 98, and 99. I-30 leads northeast 44 miles (71 km) to Little Rock, the state capital, and southwest 100 miles (160 km) to Texarkana. U.S. Route 67 (Page Avenue) runs through the center of Malvern, leading northeast 22 miles (35 km) to Benton and southwest 25 miles (40 km) to Arkadelphia. U.S. Route 270 passes northeast of Malvern on a bypass, leading east 24 miles (39 km) to Sheridan and northwest 20 miles (32 km) to Hot Springs. Arkansas Highway 9 (Main Street) leads south from the center of Malvern 64 miles (103 km) to Camden.

According to the United States Census Bureau, Malvern has a total area of 8.7 square miles (22.6 km^{2}), of which 8.6 square miles (22.4 km^{2}) are land and 0.1 square miles (0.2 km^{2}), or 0.79%, are water.

=== Climate ===
The climate in this area is characterized by hot, humid summers and generally mild to cool winters. According to the Köppen Climate Classification system, Malvern has a humid subtropical climate, abbreviated "Cfa" on climate maps.

Climate data for Malvern, Arkansas (1991–2020 normals, extremes 1883–present)
Month	Jan	Feb	Mar	Apr	May	Jun	Jul	Aug	Sep	Oct	Nov	Dec	Year
Record high °F (°C)	81 (27)	88 (31)	91 (33)	96 (36)	101 (38)	107 (42)	114 (46)	112 (44)	109 (43)	100 (38)	89 (32)	82 (28)	114 (46)
Mean maximum °F (°C)	71.1 (21.7)	74.8 (23.8)	82.0 (27.8)	86.2 (30.1)	89.9 (32.2)	95.5 (35.3)	99.0 (37.2)	100.0 (37.8)	95.5 (35.3)	89.1 (31.7)	78.3 (25.7)	72.3 (22.4)	101.3 (38.5)
Mean daily maximum °F (°C)	51.8 (11.0)	56.1 (13.4)	65.0 (18.3)	73.7 (23.2)	80.6 (27.0)	88.1 (31.2)	91.9 (33.3)	91.6 (33.1)	85.7 (29.8)	74.8 (23.8)	62.1 (16.7)	53.7 (12.1)	72.9 (22.7)
Daily mean °F (°C)	40.6 (4.8)	44.1 (6.7)	52.5 (11.4)	60.9 (16.1)	69.6 (20.9)	77.3 (25.2)	80.9 (27.2)	80.0 (26.7)	73.9 (23.3)	62.5 (16.9)	50.6 (10.3)	42.9 (6.1)	61.3 (16.3)
Mean daily minimum °F (°C)	29.4 (−1.4)	32.2 (0.1)	40.0 (4.4)	48.1 (8.9)	58.6 (14.8)	66.5 (19.2)	70.0 (21.1)	68.4 (20.2)	62.1 (16.7)	50.2 (10.1)	39.0 (3.9)	32.1 (0.1)	49.7 (9.8)
Mean minimum °F (°C)	14.5 (−9.7)	19.7 (−6.8)	24.0 (−4.4)	32.6 (0.3)	44.3 (6.8)	56.7 (13.7)	63.0 (17.2)	61.4 (16.3)	48.2 (9.0)	34.2 (1.2)	24.6 (−4.1)	19.0 (−7.2)	12.3 (−10.9)
Record low °F (°C)	−11 (−24)	−10 (−23)	11 (−12)	24 (−4)	33 (1)	44 (7)	51 (11)	43 (6)	31 (−1)	25 (−4)	9 (−13)	−2 (−19)	−11 (−24)
Average precipitation inches (mm)	4.24 (108)	4.59 (117)	5.55 (141)	6.05 (154)	5.53 (140)	4.64 (118)	4.21 (107)	3.68 (93)	3.95 (100)	4.63 (118)	5.04 (128)	5.37 (136)	57.48 (1,460)
Average snowfall inches (cm)	0.5 (1.3)	0.5 (1.3)	0.2 (0.51)	0.0 (0.0)	0.0 (0.0)	0.0 (0.0)	0.0 (0.0)	0.0 (0.0)	0.0 (0.0)	0.0 (0.0)	0.0 (0.0)	0.0 (0.0)	1.2 (3.0)
Average precipitation days (≥ 0.01 in)	8.1	8.4	9.8	8.9	10.3	7.6	8.0	7.6	6.2	7.6	8.0	9.1	99.6
Average snowy days (≥ 0.1 in)	0.2	0.3	0.2	0.0	0.0	0.0	0.0	0.0	0.0	0.0	0.0	0.0	0.7
Source: NOAA

== Demographics ==
Historical population
Census	Pop.	Note	%±
1890	1,520		—
1900	1,582		4.1%
1910	2,778		75.6%
1920	3,364		21.1%
1930	5,115		52.1%
1940	5,290		3.4%
1950	8,072		52.6%
1960	9,566		18.5%
1970	8,739		−8.6%
1980	10,163		16.3%
1990	9,256		−8.9%
2000	9,021		−2.5%
2010	10,318		14.4%
2020	10,867		5.3%
2025 (est.)	11,144	▲	2.5%
U.S. Decennial Census

=== 2020 census ===
As of the 2020 census, Malvern had a population of 10,867. The median age was 38.9 years. 19.3% of residents were under the age of 18 and 16.9% of residents were 65 years of age or older. For every 100 females there were 131.4 males, and for every 100 females age 18 and over there were 139.2 males age 18 and over.

77.9% of residents lived in urban areas, while 22.1% lived in rural areas.

There were 3,625 households in Malvern, including 2,407 family households, of which 30.7% had children under the age of 18 living in them. Of all households, 32.7% were married-couple households, 19.9% were households with a male householder and no spouse or partner present, and 39.8% were households with a female householder and no spouse or partner present. About 35.8% of all households were made up of individuals and 16.1% had someone living alone who was 65 years of age or older.

There were 4,160 housing units, of which 12.9% were vacant. The homeowner vacancy rate was 2.8% and the rental vacancy rate was 7.8%.

Malvern racial composition
Race	Number	Percentage
White (non-Hispanic)	6,492	59.74%
Black or African American (non-Hispanic)	3,050	28.07%
Native American	36	0.33%
Asian	48	0.44%
Pacific Islander	8	0.07%
Other/Mixed	609	5.6%
Hispanic or Latino	624	5.74%

=== 2000 census ===
As of the census of 2000, there were 9,021 people, 3,769 households, and 2,431 families residing in the city, and its population density was 1,227.1 inhabitants per square mile (473.8/km^{2}). There were 4,193 housing units at an average density of 570.4 units per square mile (220.2 units/km^{2}). The racial makeup of the city was 68.16% White, 28.66% Black or African American, 0.35% Native American, 0.29% Asian, 0.07% Pacific Islander, 0.53% from other races, and 1.94% from two or more races. 1.26% of the population were Hispanic or Latino of any race.

The city had 3,769 households, out of which 29.0% contained children under the age of 18, 44.1% were married couples living together, 16.3% had a female householder with no husband present, and 35.5% were non-families. 32.2% of all households were made up of individuals, and 16.8% had someone living alone who was 65 years of age or older. The average household size was 2.33 and the average family size was 2.93. Additionally, 25.0% of the city's population were under the age of 18, 9.3% from 18 to 24, 24.2% from 25 to 44, 21.5% from 45 to 64, and 20.0% were 65 years of age or older. The median age was 38 years; for every 100 females there were 85.0 males and for every 100 females age 18 and over, there were 80.7 males.

The median income for a household in the city was $27,007, and the median income for a family was $34,563. Males had a median income of $27,232 versus $18,929 for females and the per capita income for the city was $14,848. About 15.7% of families and 20.3% of the population were below the poverty line, including 27.6% of those under age 18, and 18.4% of those age 65 or over.

== Economy ==
The city is home to three Acme Brick plants and several other manufacturing companies, including Weyerhaeuser, Borden Chemical, Adams Face Veneer Company, and Pactiv. It is also the home of Grapette International, the manufacturer of Grapette soda. Malvern is the location of the Ouachita River Unit, a medium security prison.

== Arts and culture ==
=== Annual cultural events ===
Every year on the last weekend of June, Malvern City Park hosts Brickfest, an event that fills the city with music, food and activities that include a brick toss, brick car derby, and a best-dressed brick contest. Malvern also hosts Malvern Cruise Nite once a month, and the Hot Spring County Fair and Rodeo each fall.

=== Tourism ===
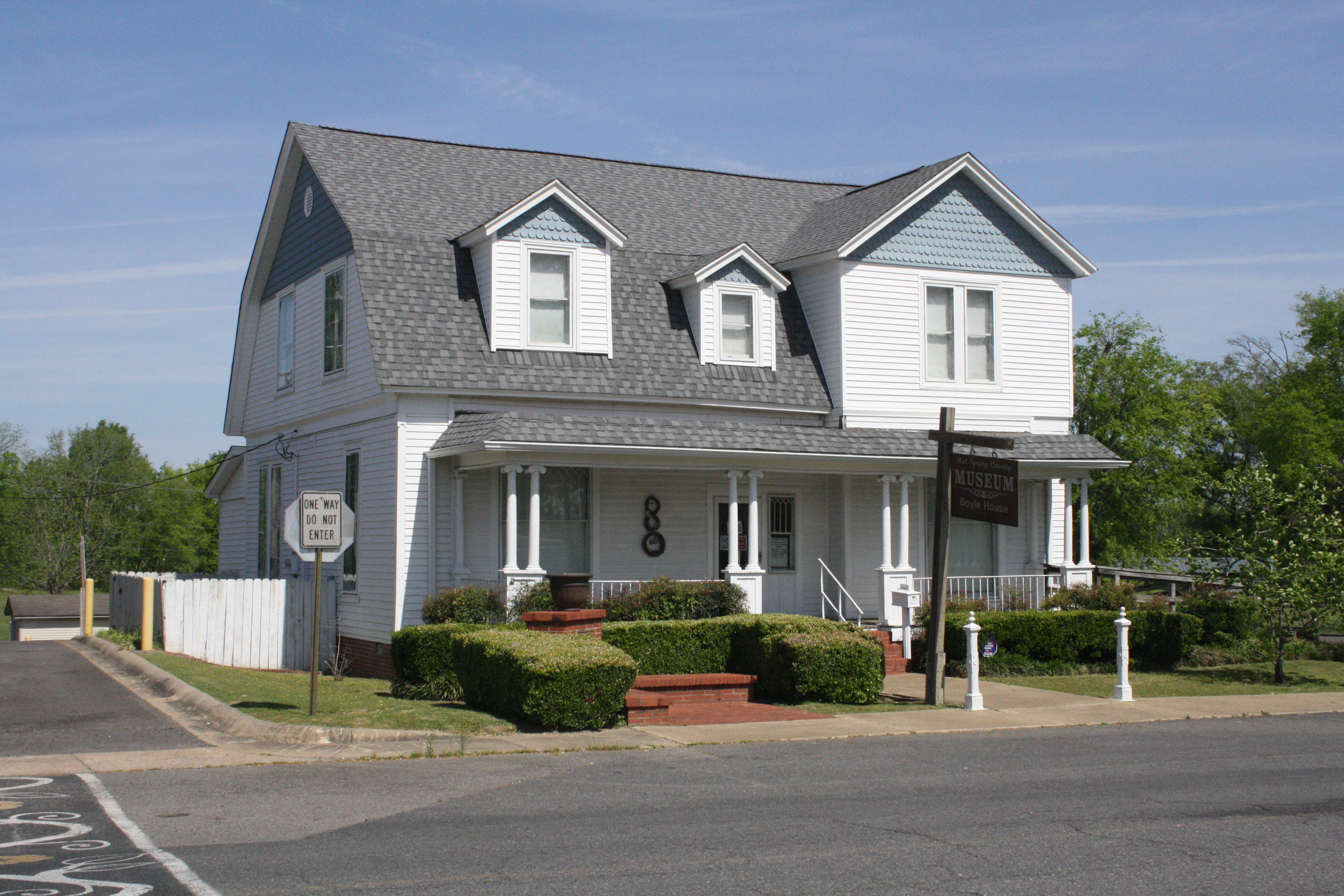
Hot Spring County Museum

History in Malvern can be found throughout the central city, including ten National Register of Historic Places listings. Located at 210 Locust Street in downtown Malvern, the art deco Hot Spring County Courthouse has been the center of county government since its construction in 1936. Also located downtown is the Bank of Malvern building, historically notable both for its distinct variation of Richardsonian Romanesque architecture and its importance in transitioning Malvern from an agricultural-based economy to one based on industry. The Hot Spring County Museum is located in the Boyle House at 302 East Third Street in Malvern.

Malvern hosts one of two whitewater parks in the state of Arkansas, located on the Ouachita River. (The other park is in Siloam Springs.) Used for training Olympic kayakers and river rescue teams, the river-wide ledge runs year-round, and is dam-released. A zip line and nature hike are available along Ouachita Bend.

== Education ==
=== Ełementary and secondary education ===
Public education for early childhood, elementary and secondary school students within the Malvern city limits is provided by Malvern School District, which leads to graduation from Malvern High School.

Glen Rose School District of Glen Rose (including Glen Rose High School) and Magnet Cove School District (including Magnet Cove High School) have Malvern postal addresses, but have no facilities in Malvern and do not include any portion of the Malvern city limits.

=== Postsecondary education ===
- Arkansas State University Three Rivers

== Media ==
The city's newspaper is the Malvern Daily Record, established in 1916. It publishes an afternoon edition Tuesday through Friday with a Saturday morning "Weekend Edition" The city also has two radio stations, KLBL (101.5), a Classic Hits format, and KZYP AM-1310, a sports station.

== Infrastructure ==
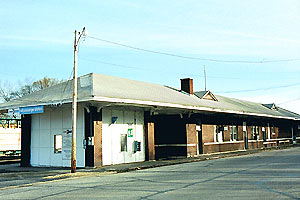
The Amtrak station

=== Transportation ===
Malvern is connected on road by Interstate 30, U.S. Route 270, and U.S. Route 67. Amtrak's Texas Eagle provides daily passenger train service to Malvern on a route extending from Chicago to Dallas and Los Angeles, and railroad freight service to Malvern is provided by the Union Pacific Railroad and the Arkansas Midland Railroad, the latter operating over the route of the original Hot Springs Railroad. The Malvern Municipal Airport (FAA Identifier: M78) serves the Malvern area.

== Notable people ==
- Julie Adams, 1926-2019 actress born as Betty May Adams
- Homer Martin Adkins, governor of Arkansas from 1941 to 1945
- Fran Bennett, actress, born in Malvern
- Frank Bonner, actor and director born in Little Rock and raised in Malvern
- Winston Bryant, politician, was born in Malvern.
- Bob Burrow, retired basketball player
- Beth Clayton, award-winning operatic mezzo-soprano
- Isaac Davis, National Football League player
- Susan Dunn, Grammy Award-winning operatic soprano
- Blaze Foley, country music singer-songwriter was born in Malvern
- David Delano Glover, Malvern lawyer and U.S. representative
- Claris G. "Crip" Hall, Arkansas Secretary of State 1937–1961.
- Madre Hill, 1995 SEC rushing champion, former NFL player
- Fred Jones, National Basketball Association player for the New York Knicks
- Tommy McCraw, former MLB player and hitting coach
- Tony Ollison, player for the Arkansas Razorbacks, Dallas Cowboys, and Dallas Desperados
- Abraham A. Pennington, state legislator who served as Speaker of the Arkansas House of Representatives
- Reggie Ritter, professional baseball player
- Gerald Skinner, former National Football League player
- Billy Bob Thornton, motion picture actor, Academy Award-winning writer, and director
- Keith Traylor, NFL player Denver Broncos and New England Patriots
- Jerry Van Dyke, actor and comedian, resided on his ranch near Malvern.
- Frederick Yates, Michigan state legislator and lawyer, born in Malvern

== See also ==
- List of cities and towns in Arkansas
- National Register of Historic Places listings in Hot Spring County, Arkansas
