= Filbert, West Virginia =

Filbert
- Unincorporated community
- Location within the state of West Virginia
- Coordinates: 37°19′5″N 81°32′38″W
- Country: United States
- State: West Virginia
- County: McDowell
- Time zone: UTC-5 (Eastern (EST))
  - Summer (DST): UTC-4 (EDT)
- ZIP codes: 24835
- GNIS feature ID: 1538960

Filbert is former coal town on Sandlick Creek now part of the City of Gary in McDowell County, West Virginia, United States. Its post office closed in 1991.

== Notable person ==
- Daisy Elliott, Michigan legislator and realtor, was born in Filbert.
