= Tony Ollison =

American football player

Personal information
- Born: Malvern, Arkansas, U.S.

Career information
- College: University of Arkansas

Career history
- As coach University of Tennessee, University of Arkansas, Dallas Cowboys, Dallas Desperados

Tony Ollison is an American former football player. The Malvern, Arkansas native played collegiately for the Arkansas Razorbacks.

Tony Ollison played high school football in Malvern, Arkansas, where he was a teammate of NFL player Keith Traylor. After high school Ollison went on to play for the Arkansas Razorbacks under coach Ken Hatfield, where he was a four-year letterman (1987–1990) and a regular contributor at defensive tackle. He registered 63 tackles in his college career, and was a starter in the 1989 and 1990 Cotton Bowl Classics. After his collegiate career ended, Ollison had a free agent tryout with the Indianapolis Colts of the National Football League and was drafted by the San Antonio Riders of the World League of American Football.

Ollison has worked as assistant strength and conditioning coach for the University of Arkansas and the University of Tennessee. He joined the Dallas Cowboys staff as strength and conditioning coach in 2000, and served in the same capacity for the Dallas Desperadoes. In 2006 Ollison became seriously ill during a Cowboys return flight from a game against the Carolina Panthers. The plane made an emergency landing in Nashville, Tennessee, where Ollison was hospitalized with a possible heart attack. His brother, Scott Ollison was a minor league infielder in the Philadelphia Phillies organization, and his nephew, Grady Ollison, was a defensive tackle for the University of Arkansas (2011–2013), and Henderson State (2015).
