= Malvern Commercial Historic District =

Historic district in Arkansas, United States

- U.S. National Register of Historic Places
- U.S. Historic district
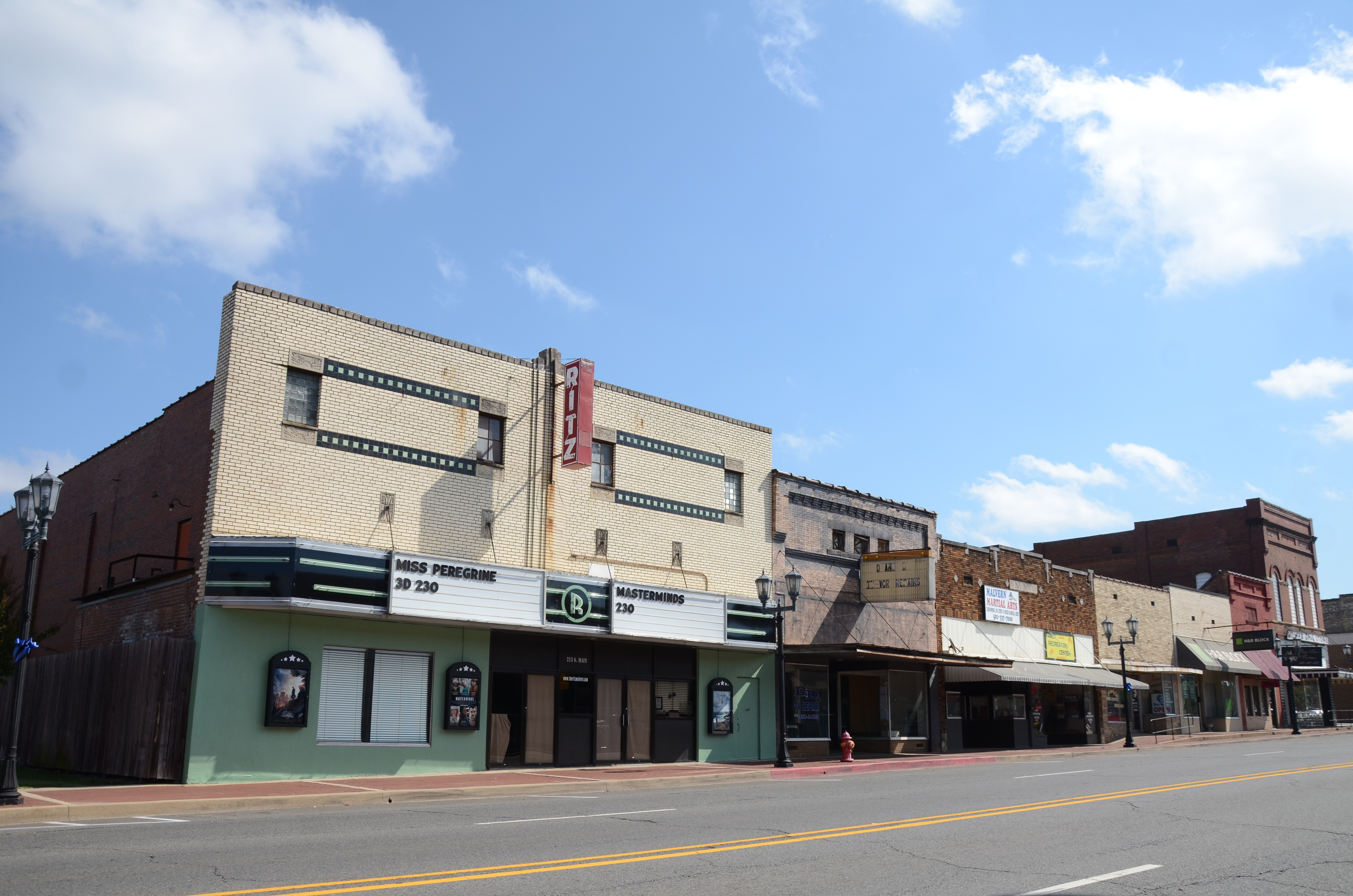

- Location within Arkansas Location within the United States
- Location: Bounded by W. 1st., S. Main, W. 5th & Locust Sts., Walnut Ridge, Arkansas
- Coordinates: 34°21′46″N 92°48′50″W
- Area: 10 acres (4.0 ha)
- Built: 1875
- NRHP reference No.: 15000626
- Added to NRHP: September 28, 2015

The Malvern Commercial Historic District encompasses the historic commercial heart of Malvern, Arkansas. The 10-acre (4.0 ha) district extends along three blocks of South Main Street, between 2nd and 5th Streets. This area was mostly developed after fires devastated the city's downtown in 1896 and 1897, and before 1925, and includes Malvern City Hall. Most of the historic buildings are one and two-story brick buildings in commercial styles of the period.

The district was listed on the National Register of Historic Places in 2015.

== See also ==
- National Register of Historic Places listings in Lawrence County, Arkansas
