= Scott Shackleton =

American politician

Member of the Chippewa County Board of Commissioners from the 1st District
- Incumbent
- Assumed office January 1, 2005

Member of the Michigan House of Representatives from the 107th district
- In office January 1, 1999 – December 31, 2004
- Preceded by: Pat Gagliardi
- Succeeded by: Gary McDowell

Personal details
- Born: January 11, 1961 (age 65)
- Party: Republican
- Spouse: Karen Shackleton
- Children: Henry Shackleton, John Shackleton
- Education: Lake Superior State University

Scott Shackleton is the chairman of the Chippewa County Board of Commissioners, and was a Republican member of the Michigan House of Representatives from 1999 through 2004. He is also a member of the International Bridge Authority, appointed by Governor Rick Snyder in March 2011.

Prior to his election to the House, Shackleton served on the Sault Ste. Marie City Commission, from 1993 through 1998. He was also news director for WSOO and WSUE.
