= John Damoose =

American politician (born 1972)

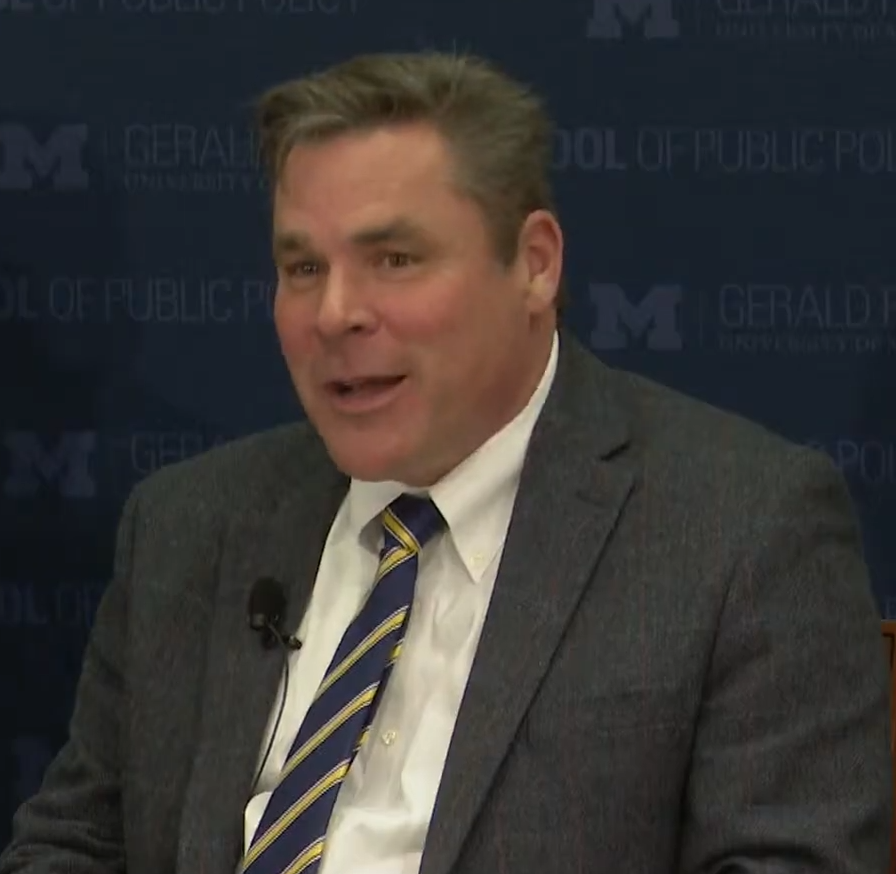
- Damoose in 2026

Member of the Michigan Senate from the 37th district
- Incumbent
- Assumed office January 1, 2023
- Preceded by: Wayne Schmidt

Member of the Michigan House of Representatives from the 107th district
- In office January 1, 2021 – January 1, 2023
- Preceded by: Lee Chatfield
- Succeeded by: Neil Friske

Personal details
- Born: February 5, 1972 (age 54) Alexandria, Virginia
- Party: Republican
- Children: 4
- Education: University of Michigan (BA)

John N. Damoose (/ˈdəmuːs/ də-MUUS; born February 5, 1972) is an American politician and television producer serving as a member of the Michigan Senate for the 37th district. He has served since January 1, 2023, succeeding Wayne Schmidt after redistricting. He previously served as a member of the Michigan House of Representatives from the 107th district. He is known for working on bipartisan initiatives such as sexual assault prosecution reform, Great Lake conservation projects, and manufacturing revitalization efforts.

== Education ==
Damoose graduated from Ernest W. Seaholm High School in Birmingham, Michigan. He earned a Bachelor of Arts degree in political science from the University of Michigan in 1994.

== Career ==
=== Before Political Office (pre-2021) ===
After graduating from college, Damoose worked for the Christian Broadcast Network in Virginia Beach, Virginia and later as a producer on The 700 Club. In 1997, he returned to Michigan, where he founded 45 North Productions with his father. Damoose has also written several books, including Red Sky in the Morning. His company has produced numerous television specials on American history, including A Nation Remembers: The Story of Pentagon Memorial, The Medal: Celebrating Our Nation's Highest Honor, and Arlington in Eternal Vigil.

=== Representative for the 107th District of Michigan ===
In the 2020 Republican primary, Damoose placed first in a field of seven candidates for a seat in the Michigan House of Representatives. Damoose then defeated Democratic nominee Jim Page in the November general election. He assumed office on January 1, 2021. In this role, he received various recognitions, such as the renowned Excellence in Education Award. Damoose served as Majority Vice-Chair of the Communications and Technology committee; he additionally was a member of the House Regulatory Reform, Rules and Competitiveness, and Education Committees.

=== Senator for the 37th District of Michigan ===
Damoose currently holds the position of State Senator for Michigan's 37th district, winning the election on November 8, 2022, by nearly 18,000 votes. Simultaneously, he serves as the Minority Vice-Chair for both the Education committee and the Appropriations Subcommittee on Joint Capital Outlay. Further, he is a member of the Appropriations, Energy and Environment, and Housing and Human Services committees.

== Personal life ==
Damoose and his wife, Margo, have four children and live in Harbor Springs, Michigan. Damoose's grandfather, Naseeb G. “Ance” Damoose, was a political leader who served as the city manager of Ypsilanti, Michigan in the 1950s. Damoose's father, John B. Damoose was a marketing executive at Chrysler and Ford Motor Company before establishing 45 North Productions. John B. was Chrysler's youngest Vice President at the time as well as one of the first Lebanese individuals to hold an executive position in the automobile industry.
