= Michigan's 107th House of Representatives district =

American legislative district

Michigan's 107th State House of Representatives district
Representative
Parker Fairbairn; R–Harbor Springs
- Demographics: 83.7% White; 1% Black; 1.9% Hispanic; 0.7% Asian; 5.5% Native American; 0.5% Other; 6.6% Multiracial
- Population (2024): 91,467

Michigan's 107th House of Representatives district (also referred to as Michigan's 107th House district) is a legislative district within the Michigan House of Representatives located in parts of Cheboygan, Chippewa, and Mackinac counties, as well as all of Charlevoix and Emmet counties. The district was created in 1965, when the Michigan House of Representatives district naming scheme changed from a county-based system to a numerical one.

== List of representatives ==
Representative	Party	Dates	Residence	Notes
Einar E. Erlandsen	Democratic	1965–1966	Escanaba	
Charles H. Varnum	Republican	1967–1982	Manistique	
Pat Gagliardi	Democratic	1983–1998	Drummond Island	
Scott Shackleton	Republican	1999–2004	Sault Ste. Marie	
Gary McDowell	Democratic	2005–2010	Rudyard	
Frank Foster	Republican	2011–2014	Petoskey	Lived in Pellston until around 2013.
Lee Chatfield	Republican	2015–2021	Levering	
John Damoose	Republican	2021–2022	Harbor Springs	
Neil Friske	Republican	2023–2025	Charlevoix	
Parker Fairbairn	Republican	2025–present	Harbor Springs	

== Recent elections ==
=== 2020s ===
2026 Michigan House of Representatives election
Party	Candidate	Votes	%
Republican	Parker Fairbairn (incumbent)	27,899	57.42
Democratic	Melissa Perron	20,688	42.58
Total votes		48,587	100
Republican hold			

2024 Michigan House of Representatives election
Party	Candidate	Votes	%
Republican	Parker Fairbairn	34,728	60.7
Democratic	Jodi Decker	22,516	39.3
Total votes		57,244	100
Republican hold			

2022 Michigan House of Representatives election
Party	Candidate	Votes	%
Republican	Neil Friske	26,867	56.6
Democratic	Jodi Decker	20,610	43.4
Total votes		47,477	100
Republican hold			

2020 Michigan House of Representatives election
Party	Candidate	Votes	%
Republican	John Damoose	31,666	60.9
Democratic	Jim Page	20,367	39.1
Total votes		52,033	100
Republican hold			

2018 Michigan House of Representatives election
Party	Candidate	Votes	%
Republican	Lee Chatfield	24,834	58.7
Democratic	Joanne Schmidt Galloway	17,448	41.3
Total votes		42,282	100
Republican hold			

2016 Michigan House of Representatives election
Party	Candidate	Votes	%
Republican	Lee Chatfield	30,131	67.1
Democratic	Phil Bellfy	14,781	32.9
Total votes		44,912	100
Republican hold			

2014 Michigan House of Representatives election
Party	Candidate	Votes	%
Republican	Lee Chatfield	19,341	60.9
Democratic	Jim Page	12,396	39.1
Total votes		31,737	100
Republican hold			

2012 Michigan House of Representatives election
Party	Candidate	Votes	%
Republican	Frank Foster	25,301	58.0
Democratic	Suzanne Shumway	18,301	42.0
Total votes		43,602	100
Republican hold			

2010 Michigan House of Representatives election
Party	Candidate	Votes	%
Republican	Frank Foster	19,337	63.0
Democratic	Richard Timmer	11,350	37.0
Total votes		30,687	100
Republican gain from Democratic			

2008 Michigan House of Representatives election
Party	Candidate	Votes	%
Democratic	Gary McDowell	31,851	68.7
Republican	Alex Strobehn	14,500	31.3
Total votes		46,351	100
Democratic hold			

== Historical district boundaries ==
Map	Description	Apportionment Plan	Notes
	Chippewa County (part); Bay Mills Township; Sault Ste. Marie; Soo Township; Sugar Island Township; Superior Township; Whitefish Township; Delta County (part); Bark River Township; Bay de Noc Township; Brampton Township; Ensign Township; Escanaba; Escanaba Township; Fairbanks Township; Ford River Township; Garden Township; Gladstone; Masonville Township; Nahma Township; Wells Township; Luce County; Schoolcraft County (part); Doyle Township; Germfask Township; Hiawatha Township; Inwood Township; Manistique; Manistique Township; Mueller Township; Thompson Township	1964 Apportionment Plan	
	Alger County (part); Mathias Township; Cheboygan County (part); Munro Township; Chippewa County; Delta County (part); Baldwin Township; Bay de Noc Township; Ensign Township; Fairbanks Township; Garden Township; Masonville Township; Nahma Township; Emmet County; Luce County; Mackinac County; Schoolcraft County	1972 Apportionment Plan	
	Alger County; Chippewa County; Emmet County; Luce County; Mackinac County; Schoolcraft County	1982 Apportionment Plan	
	Chippewa County; Emmet County; Luce County; Mackinac County; Schoolcraft County	1992 Apportionment Plan	
	Cheboygan County (part); Koehler Township; Tuscarora Township; Chippewa County; Emmet County; Mackinac County	2001 Apportionment Plan	
	Cheboygan County (part); Beaugrand Township; Cheboygan; Hebron Township; Koehler Township; Mackinaw Township; Munro Township; Tuscarora Township; Chippewa County; Emmet County; Mackinac County	2011 Apportionment Plan	
