= Frank Foster (Michigan politician) =

American politician

Frank D. Foster

Member of the Michigan House of Representatives from the 107th district
- In office January 1, 2011 – December 31, 2014
- Preceded by: Gary McDowell
- Succeeded by: Lee Chatfield

Personal details
- Born: July 31, 1986 (age 40) Alanson, Michigan
- Party: Republican
- Education: Grand Valley State University
- Committees: Chairman, Commerce
- Website: Official website

Frank Foster is a Republican politician from the U.S. state of Michigan. He was a member of the Michigan House of Representatives, representing the 107th District. Foster was elected in 2010 and 2012, but was defeated in the 2014 Republican primary.

== Elections ==
In his first election and attempt at running for office, Foster faced a primary challenge from Mackinac County Commissioner Mike Patrick, and won with a 61-49% margin. In the general election, Foster faced Democrat Dick Timmer, a Chippewa County Commission, and won with a 63-47% margin.

In his 2012 re-election campaign, Foster did not have a primary opponent. In the general election, he faced Democratic challenger Suzanne Shumway, and won with a 58-42% margin.

In 2014, Foster lost his primary against a Tea Party challenger, Lee Chatfield. 54–46.

== Michigan representative ==
Foster served his first term as Chairman of the House Natural Resources, Tourism, and Outdoor Recreation Committee, and also served on the Tax Policy Committee and Banking and Financial Services Committee. Foster is serving his second term as Chairman of the House Commerce Committee, and is also serving on the Tax Policy Committee, Health Policy Committee, and Michigan Competitiveness Committee.

Serving with a Republican legislature and Governor, Foster has voted on successful legislation to make Michigan a right-to-work state, repeal the Michigan Business Tax and replace it with the Corporate Income Tax, and eliminate the pension tax exemption for state employees, and has made drastic reforms to the state's K-12 education system, including eliminating the cap on charter schools and instituting a controversial teacher merit-pay compensation system. Foster has also championed the expansion of the state's promotional advertising campaign, "Pure Michigan".

== Education ==
Foster is a graduate of Petoskey High School in Petoskey, Michigan. Foster earned a bachelor's degree in business and finance from Grand Valley State University.

== Controversy ==
In May 2012, it was reported that Representative Foster called a female member of the Michigan Nurses Association the "C-word" after a dispute over a lawnmower in downtown Lansing. Foster denied the accusations, and it was later reported that the woman had been intentionally trying to antagonize the gathering that Foster was attending.
