= Frederick Yates (politician) =

American politician and lawyer

Frederick Yates (October 3, 1914 – October 9, 1971) was an American politician and lawyer.

Born in Malvern, Arkansas, Yates moved with his family to Detroit, Michigan in 1925. In 1932, Yates graduated from Northwestern High School. He received his bachelor's degree from West Virginia State University in 1936 and his law degree from Detroit College of Law. He practiced law in Detroit, Michigan. Yates worked as a playground supervisor for the Detroit Parks and Recreation Department and at the Ford Motor and US Rubber factories to help pay for his education. From 1955 until 1962, Yates served in the Michigan House of Representatives and was a Democrat. He then served on the Wayne County, Michigan Board of Commissioners from 1968 until his death in 1971. Yates died at the Wayne County Hospital, in Detroit, Michigan from a long illness.
