= Onota =

Onota may refer to:

- Onota (beetle), a genus of beetle in the family Carabidae
- Onota, Au Train Township, Michigan, a historical village
- Onota, Onota Township, Michigan, a current unincorporated community
- Onota Township, Michigan
- Lake Onota, in Pittsfield, Massachusetts
