= Manistique Lakes =

Pair of lakes in the state of Lakes of Michigan, United States

- Location: Upper Peninsula, Michigan, United States
- Type: Chain of lakes
- Primary inflows: Various streams and creeks
- Primary outflows: Manistique River (Big Manistique Lake to Lake Michigan)
- Basin countries: United States

There are three Manistique Lakes in the Upper Peninsula of Michigan. The lakes include North Manistique Lake, Big Manistique Lake, and South Manistique Lake. The towns surrounding the lakes are Curtis, Germfask, and Helmer. The lakes are known as popular destinations for vacationing and fishing. They are also in close proximity to other natural sights such as the Great Lakes, rivers, and smaller lakes as well as tourist attractions including the Canada–US border, the Soo Locks, Mackinac Island, parks, and museums.

== North Manistique Lake ==
North Manistique Lake is located in Luce County, Michigan. The lake has about 1700 acres of surface area. Springs on the northern and eastern shores and an inlet on the western shore flow into the lake. Helmer Creek provides the only outlet moving south into Big Manistique Lake. Both private and commercial residences populate most of the shoreline with some public land in the form of county parks and boat launches.

The bottom of the lake is bowl shaped. It contains some shallow flat areas and a deep area in the middle. Nearly half of the lake is less than fifteen feet deep while the maximum depth is approximately fifty feet.

In the deep sections of the lake, the substrate found at the bottom is peat, and in the shallow sections of the lake, the substrates found at the bottom are sand and marl. On the western shore, there is a shallow rock reef. While aquatic vegetation is rarely found, some plants are able to grow in North Manistique including rushes, Chara, and Potamogeton.

=== Fish community ===
North Manistique Lake shares many of the same species of fish as inland lakes of Michigan, Minnesota, and Wisconsin. Walleyes, northern pike, perch, trout, splake, and smallmouth bass are some of the popular fish found in the lake.

Walleyes and yellow perch started being stocked in the mid-1930s and continued until the early 1940s. Rainbow trout were stocked from 1947 to 1961 and again in 1982. Northern pike was stocked from 1962 to 1977 and in 1988, 1989, 1991, 1993, 1998, and 2000. Brown trout was stocked from 1980 to 1984 since the program was discontinued after 1984. Walleye fry and fingerlings have been stocked since the late 1970s and have continued to be stocked until 2012. Adult lake trout have been stocked from 1982 through 1999.

Rock bass and smallmouth bass in North Manistique have won eleven State of Michigan Master Angler awards from 1994 to 2000.

== Big Manistique Lake ==
Big Manistique Lake, also known as Manistique Lake, is located in Luce County and Mackinac County in Michigan. The lake is the largest of the three Manistique Lakes with around 10,000 acres of surface area. Helmer Creek flows into the lake on the north side, and Portage Creek flows into the lake on the south side from South Manistique Lake. Portage Creek contains the Portage Creek Dam which adjusts the water level in South Manistique Lake for summer recreation. The dam also lets fish travel both upstream and downstream. Helmer Creek is a trout stream and flows from North Manistique into Big Manistique. Helmer Creek also has a dam called the Tressler Dam which allows fish to easily flow downstream. Manistique River is an outlet on the west side of Big Manistique and drains into Lake Michigan. The Manistique Lake Dam is downstream of the lake and the connection between the Manistique River and the Fox River. The dam keeps fish from moving from the Manistique River to Big Manistique Lake.

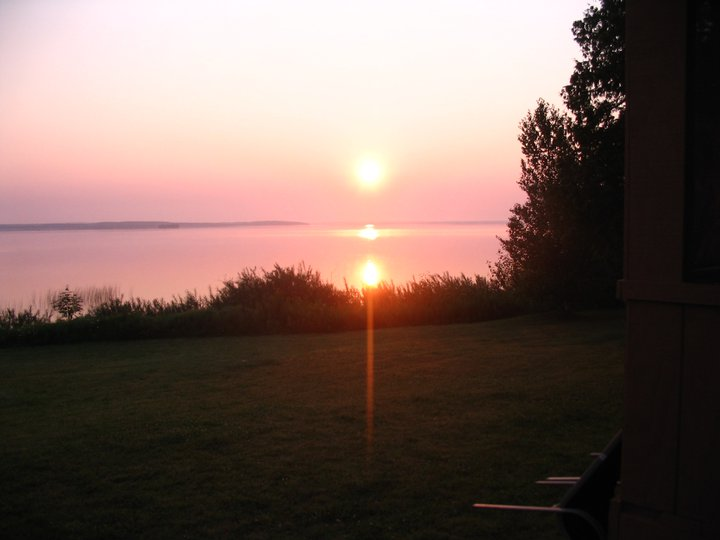
Big Manistique Lake

The shore of Big Manistique is populated by both private and commercial residences. There is also some public land containing four boat access sites.

The lake has a uniform bathymetry with maximum depth of about twenty feet. The majority of the lake has a depth of less than fifteen feet. In the shallow areas of the lake, the substrate at the bottom of the lake consists of sand, gravel, and rock, while in deeper areas, the substrate at the bottom of the lake consists of sand and organic matter. Aquatic vegetation is rare and can be found in the lake's shallow sections and in submerged beds.

=== Fish community ===
Fish families that can be found in Big Manistique Lake are Cyprinidae, Catostomidae, Centrarchidae, Esocidae, Ictaluridae, Percidae, and Slamonida. Minnows, white suckers, shorthead redhorse, silver redhorse, panfish such as yellow perch and rock bass, and lake herring make up the prey fish population in the lake. Walleye and bluegill fish are also common in Big Manistique. Walleye fry were stocked beginning and ending in 1935. Then, they were stocked from 1970 up until 1980 and again in 2005. Lake sturgeon were stocked in 1983, 1984, 1988, and 1990, and smallmouth bass were stocked in 1998.

Northern pike, rock bass, and smallmouth bass from Big Manistique Lake from 1994 to 2005 have won three State of Michigan Master Angler awards.

== South Manistique Lake ==
South Manistique Lake is also known as Whitefish Lake. It has a surface area of approximately 4000 acres. The lake is situated in the northwestern part of Mackinac County in the towns of Portage, Michigan and Newton Township, Michigan. Curtis, Michigan is in between South Manistique and Big Manistique lakes, on the northern shore of South Manistique. The land surrounding the lake is described as wetlands of woods and flowers with sandy soil.

There are four streams that flow into the lake: Norton Creek, Taylor Creek, Strom Creek, and Shoepac River. The only outlet of the lake is Portage Creek in Curtis, and it drains into Big Manistique.

The deepest part of the lake is twenty-nine feet. The shore consists of sand, muck, and fibrous peat. Aquatic vegetation is more prominent in South Manistique compared to the other two lakes. Some of the vegetation includes Chara, Potomegaton, bladderwort, flatstem pondweed, northern milfoil, lily pads, cattails, bulrushes, and common naiad.

There are four boat launches available for public access, one owned by the town of Curtis and three owned by the Michigan Department of Natural Resources. The lake is popular for recreation activities in the summer and ice fishing in the winter.

=== Fish community ===
Walleye fish are a prominent species found in South Manistique Lake. The lake was stocked in the early 1970s through the mid-1990s. After the mid-1990s, the lake began supporting natural reproduction of the walleyes. Bluegill was reported as having poor fishery due to high angler harvest as well as predators such as walleyes and other large fish. Several other fish species found in South Manistique include yellow perch, smallmouth bass, largemouth bass, rainbow trout, and splake. Muskellunge fish were stocked in 1972 and after 1980 every two to four years. Stocking of muskellunge decreased in the 1990s but still continues. Most populations are maintained by natural reproduction in South Manistique.

== Aquatic plants ==
Aquatic plants in lakes provide a source of food for bacteria, fish, waterfowl, insects, and mammals because they convert sunlight and nutrients into living plant tissue than can be used by these organisms. Roots from the vegetation also make a diverse environment for the fish which is essential for their reproduction.

== Tourism and recreational activities ==
Tourists visit the Manistique Lakes year-round as both warm and cold recreation are offered. Cabins are available for visitors to rent throughout the year by local rental companies in surrounding towns.

=== Warm weather ===
Warmer temperatures start in late April. The warm weather opens activities including fishing, swimming, snorkeling, and water skiing. Boats, motors, and jet skis can be rented from local dealers. There are many public access sights on the lakes for both recreational boating and personal watercraft in the town of Curtis, Michigan.

=== Cold weather ===
Ice begins to form in early December. Winter sports and ice fishing events are available from late December to mid-April.

=== Attractions in the Manistique Lakes area ===
- Tahquamenon Falls State Park has the Tahquamenon Falls where tourists have the options of bird-watching, fishing, hiking, sightseeing, camping, snowmobiling, and skiing.
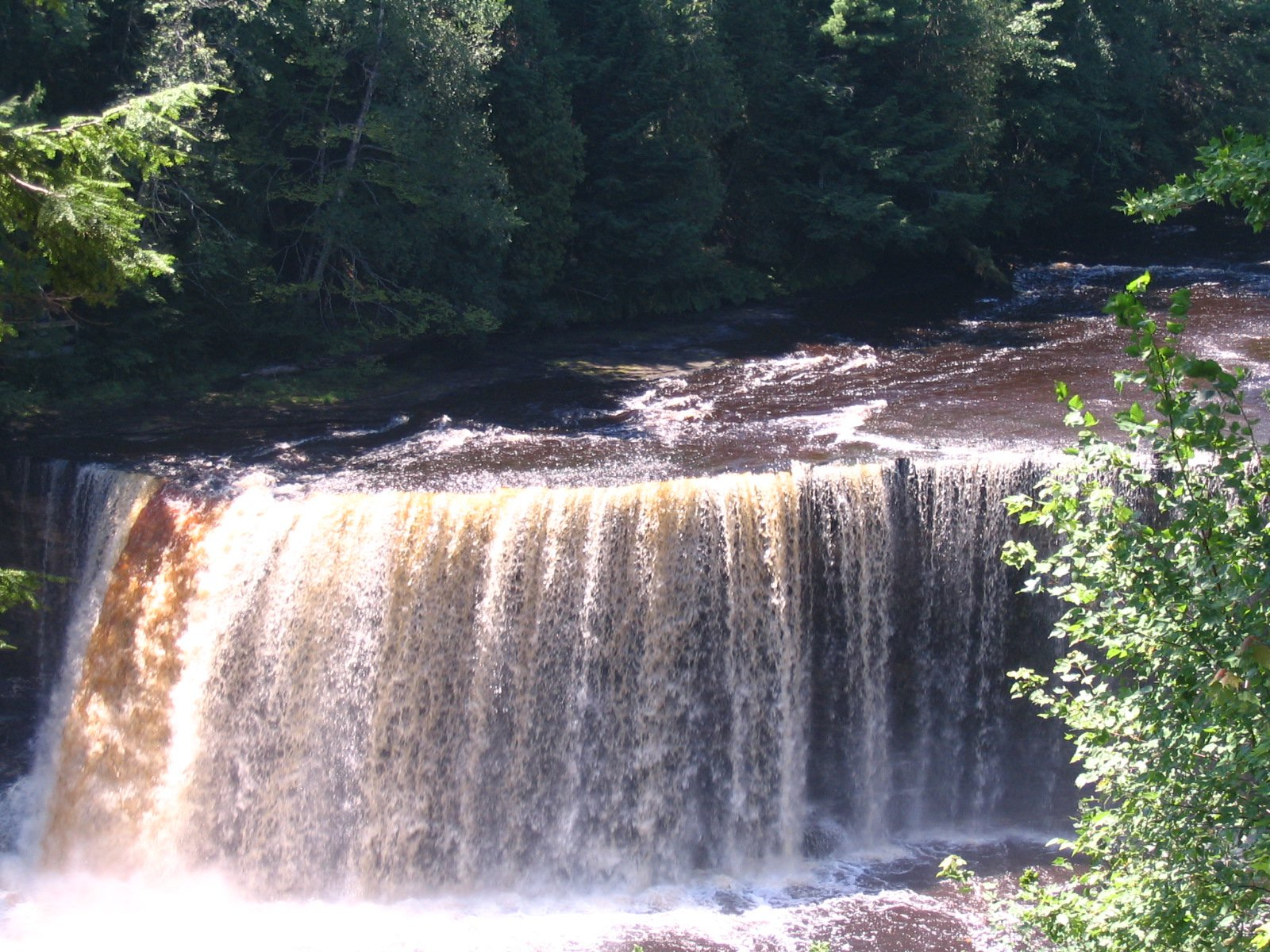
  The Tahquamenon Falls
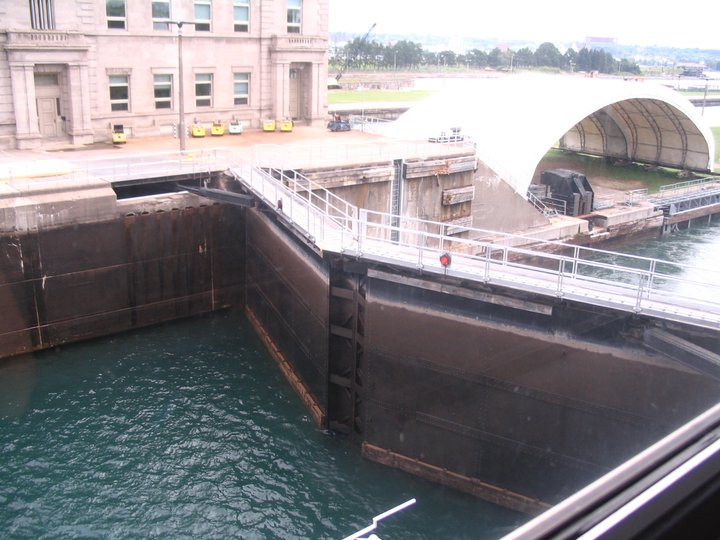
  The Soo Locks in Sault Ste Marie, Michigan
- Big Springs "Kitch-iti-kipi" is Michigan's biggest water spring.
- Seney National Wildlife Refuge has many wildlife for tourists to observe.
- Crisp Point is one of the lighthouses on Lake Superior.
- Garlyn Zoo is located at the top of Lake Michigan and contains both native and exotic animals.
- Pictured Rocks National Lakeshore is a park on Lake Superior with many natural phenomena including beaches, cliffs, sand dunes, waterfalls, lakes, and forest.
- Fayette Historic State Park presents forests, cliffs, and a harbor on Lake Michigan for tourists to experience.
- Oswald's Bear Ranch is the largest bear ranch in the United States.
- Toonerville Trolley is a railroad that travels through forest with a variety of wildlife to the Tahquamenon River.
- Tahquamenon River Logging Museum contains artifacts from lumberjack days and has a nature trail through the Tahquamenon Forest.
- The Soo Locks is the largest waterway traffic system in the world located in Sault Ste Marie, Michigan.
- Mackinac Island is located between the Upper Peninsula and Lower Peninsula in Michigan. The island has history of the United States, the Great Lakes, and Michigan for tourists to explore.
- Mackinac Bridge connects the upper and lower Michigan peninsulas and allows car travel between the two.
- Great Lakes Shipwreck Museum contains shipwreck artifacts collected from the Great Lakes and is located at Whitefish Point, Michigan.
- The Two Hearted River is known as one of the Wild Rivers in Michigan.

== Rivers in Manistique Lakes area ==
- The Manistique River flows from the west end of Big Manistique Lake to Manistique, Michigan and empties into Lake Michigan. The river is approximately eighty miles long and two to ten feet deep. Sand and gravel make up the bottom. The river provides canoeing, kayaking, and rafting as well as fishing for northern pike, smallmouth bass, and walleye.
- The Fox River flows from Alger County and Northern Schoolcraft County. There are four campgrounds on river. The river offers a large population of brook trout for fishing.
- The Two Hearted River connects the mouth of Dawnson Creek to the mouth of the East Branch of the river. The river offers activities such as wading, canoeing, and fishing for brook and rainbow trout.
- The Tahquamenon River provides canoeing and fishing for brook and brown trout, walleyes, and muskellunge.

== See also ==
- List of lakes in Michigan
