= Onota angulicollis =

Scientific classification
- Domain: Eukaryota
- Kingdom: Animalia
- Phylum: Arthropoda
- Class: Insecta
- Order: Coleoptera
- Suborder: Adephaga
- Family: Carabidae
- Genus: Onota
- Species: O. angulicollis

Binomial name
- Onota angulicollis (Reiche, 1842)

Species of beetle

Onota angulicollis is a species of ground beetle in the family Carabidae. It is found in Central America, North America, and South America.
