= Manistique, Michigan =

- City
- City of Manistique
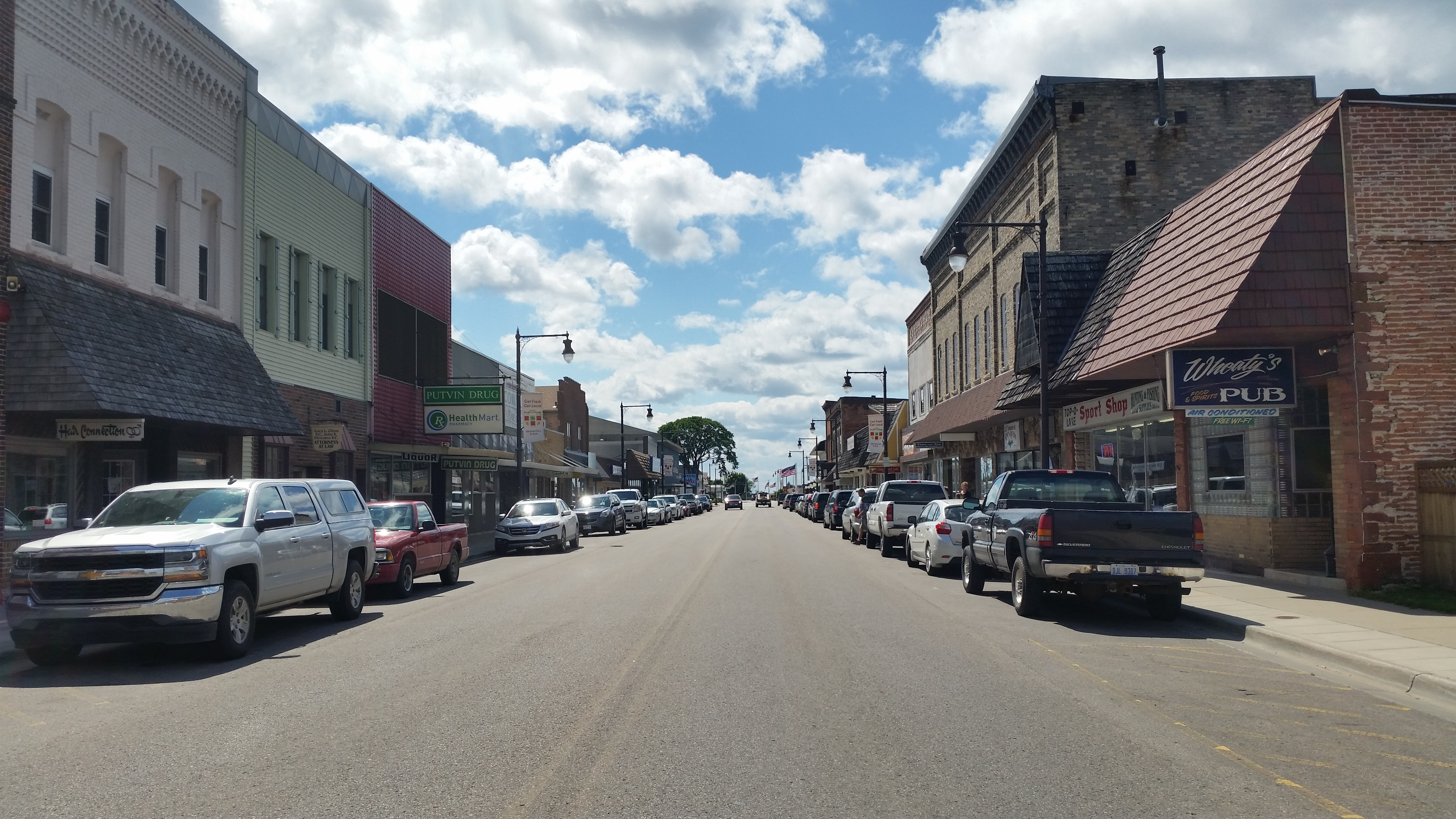
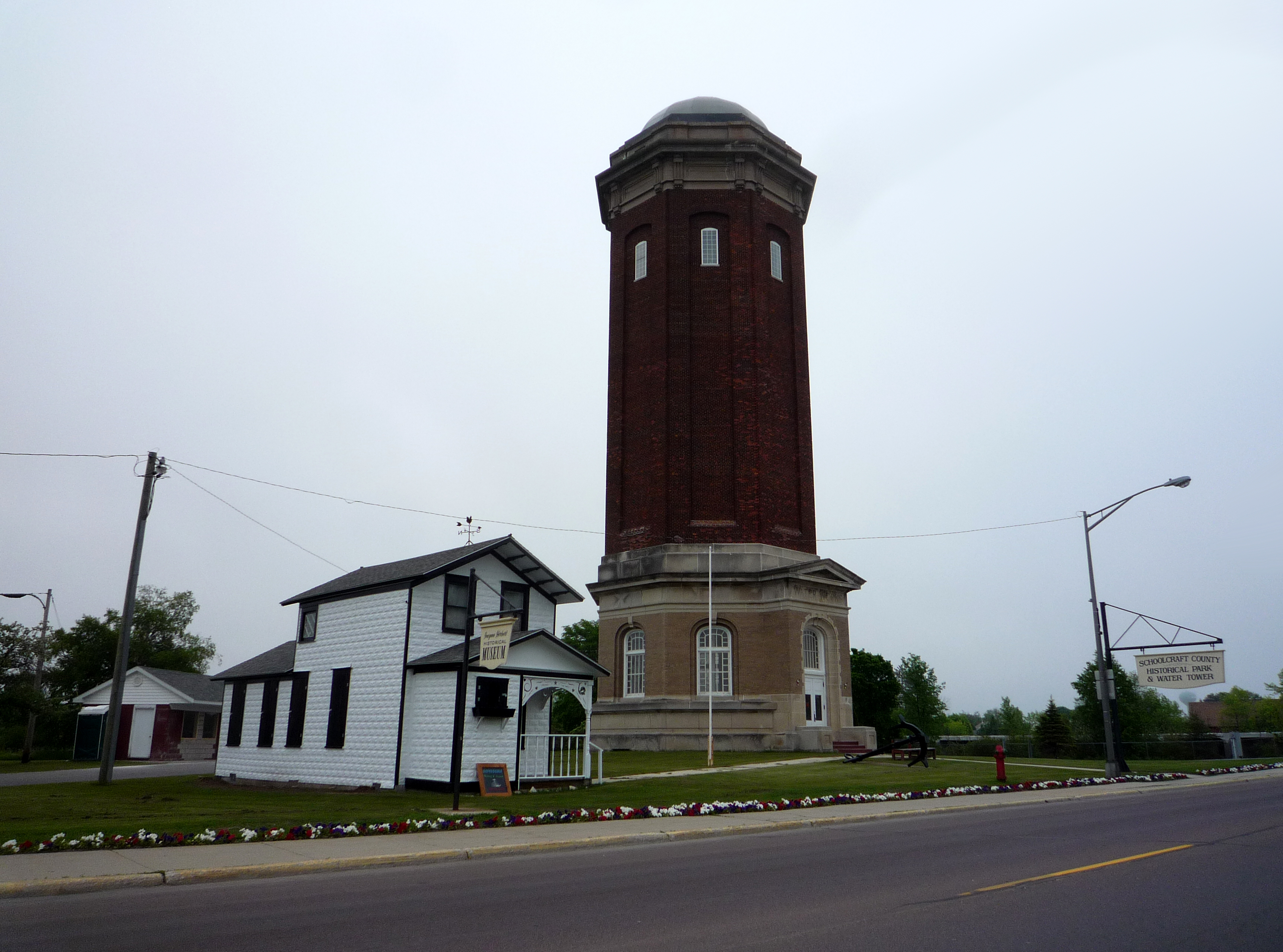
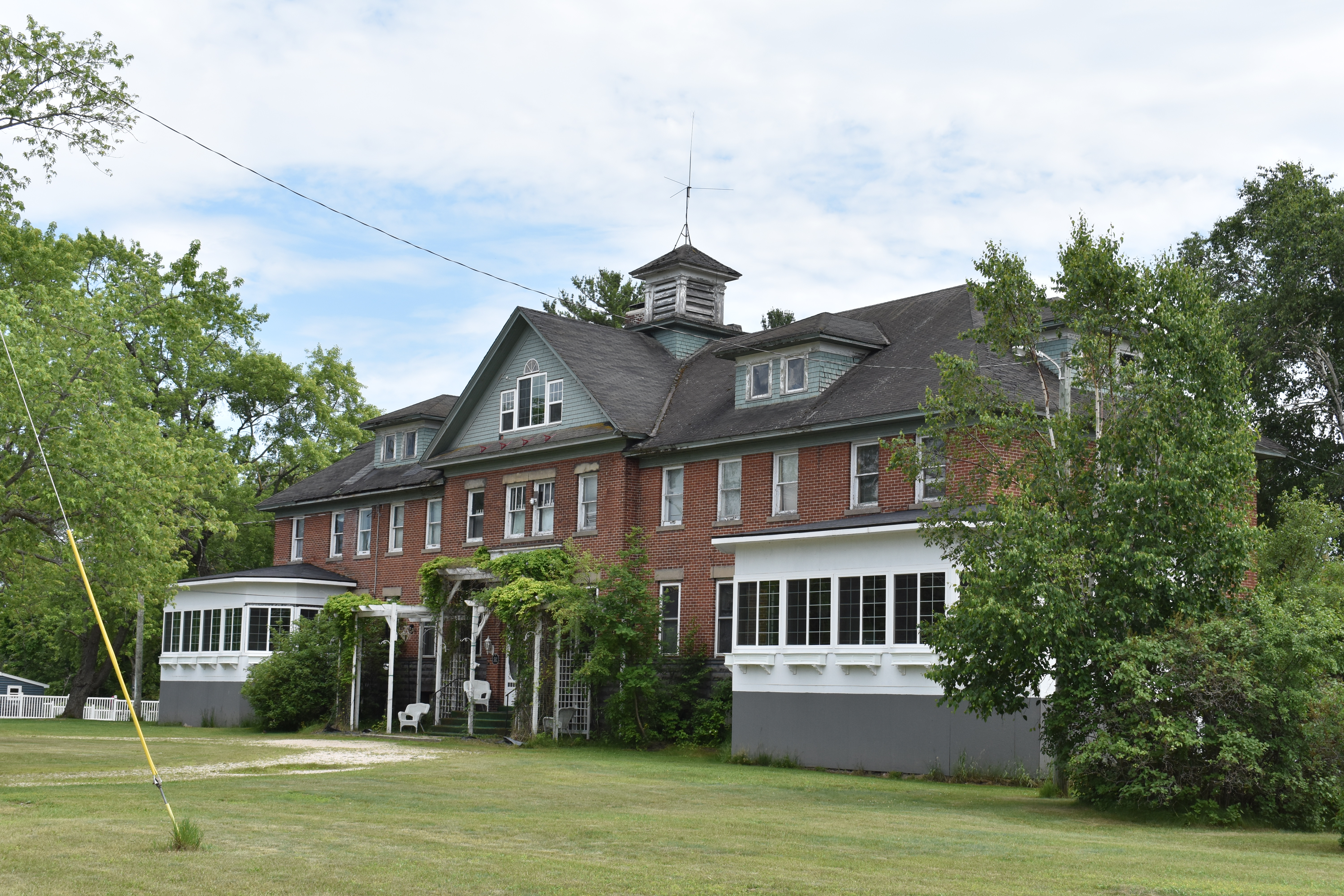
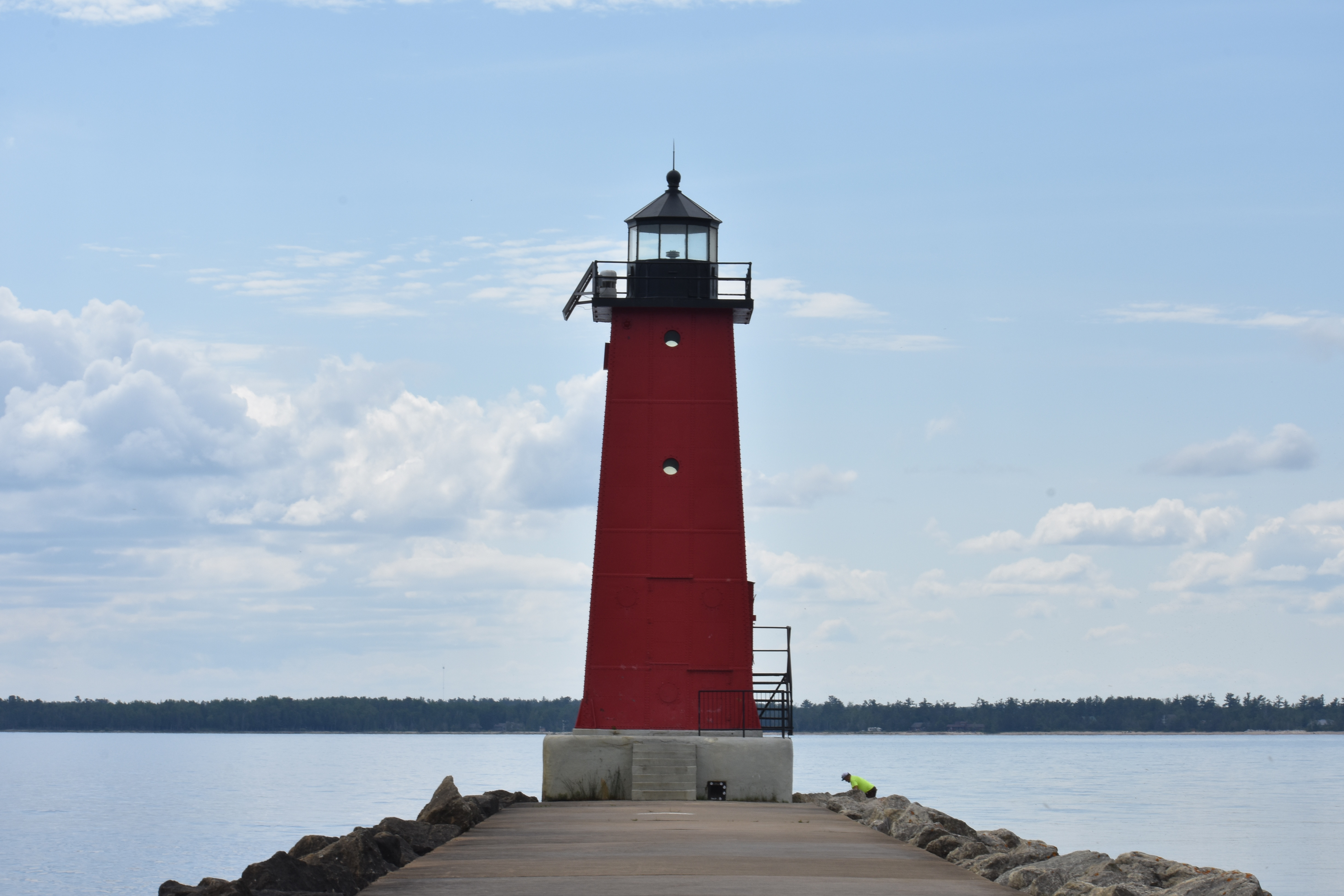
- Looking south along Cedar Street Manistique Pumping Station Schoolcraft County Poor House Manistique East Breakwater Light

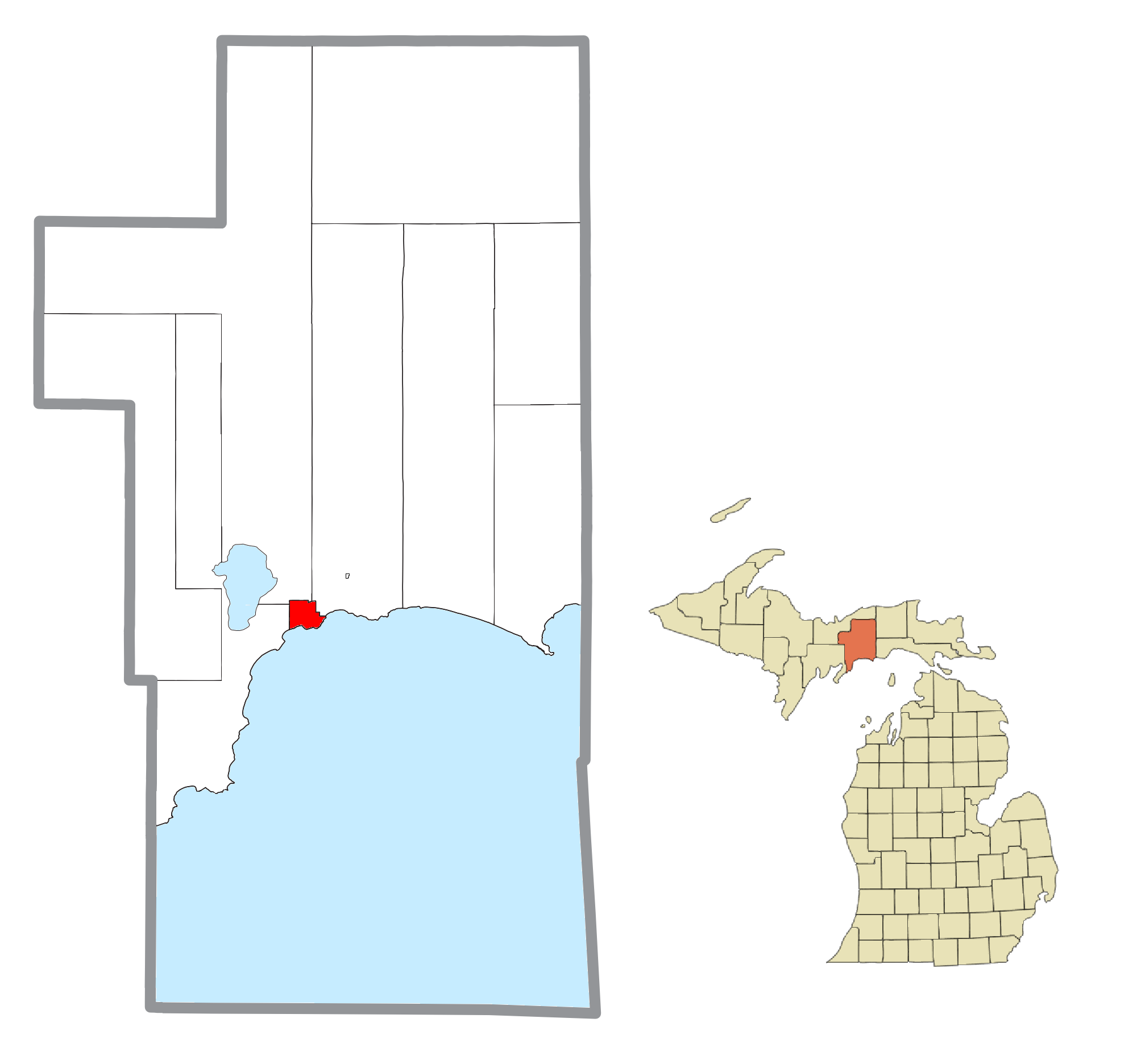
- Location within Schoolcraft County

- Location within the state of Michigan Location within the United States
- Coordinates: 45°57′28″N 86°14′59″W
- Country: United States
- State: Michigan
- County: Schoolcraft
- Incorporated: 1883 (village); 1901 (city)

Government
  - Type: Council–manager
  - Mayor: Joan Ecclesine
  - Clerk: Taylor Treece
  - Manager: Corey Barr

Area
  - Total: 3.52 sq mi (9.11 km^{2})
  - Land: 3.21 sq mi (8.31 km^{2})
  - Water: 0.31 sq mi (0.80 km^{2})
- Elevation: 600 ft (183 m)

Population (2020)
  - Total: 2,828
  - Density: 881.2/sq mi (340.24/km^{2})
- Time zone: UTC-5 (Eastern (EST))
  - Summer (DST): UTC-4 (EDT)
- ZIP code(s): 49854
- Area code: 906
- FIPS code: 26-50760
- GNIS feature ID: 1620685
- Website: Official website

Manistique (/mænɪsˈtik/ man-iss-TEEK) is the only city in and the county seat of Schoolcraft County in the U.S. state of Michigan. As of the 2020 census, the city population was 2,828.

The city borders the adjacent Manistique Township, but the two are administered independently. The city lies on the north shore of Lake Michigan at the mouth of the Manistique River, which forms a natural harbor that has been improved with breakwaters, dredging, and the Manistique East Breakwater Light. The city is named after the river. The economy depends heavily on tourism from Lake Michigan, as well as nearby Indian Lake State Park and Palms Book State Park.

== Nickname ==
Manistique is nicknamed "The Emerald City." It is believed to be named for the emerald green waters of the nearby Kitch-iti-kipi spring, the largest spring in the state of Michigan. The Manistique Area Schools athletic teams are referred to as the "Emeralds." Several local businesses include "Emerald City" in their names.

== History ==
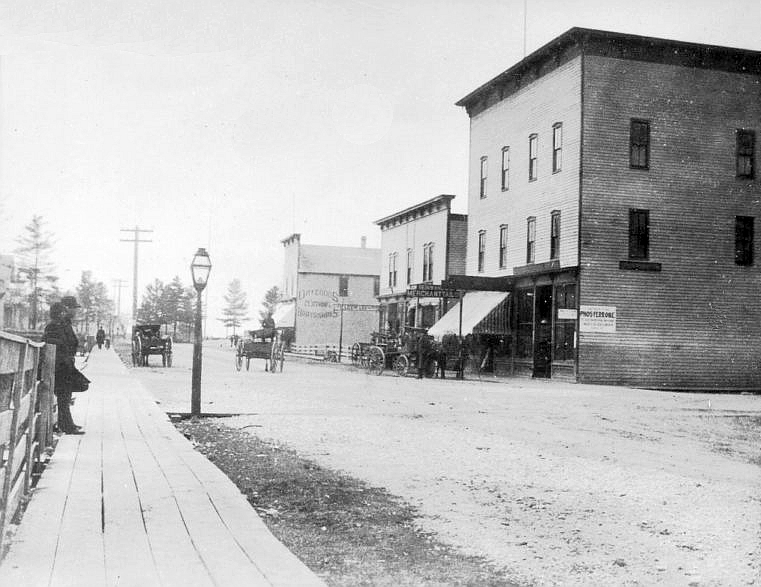
Cedar Street, 1880s

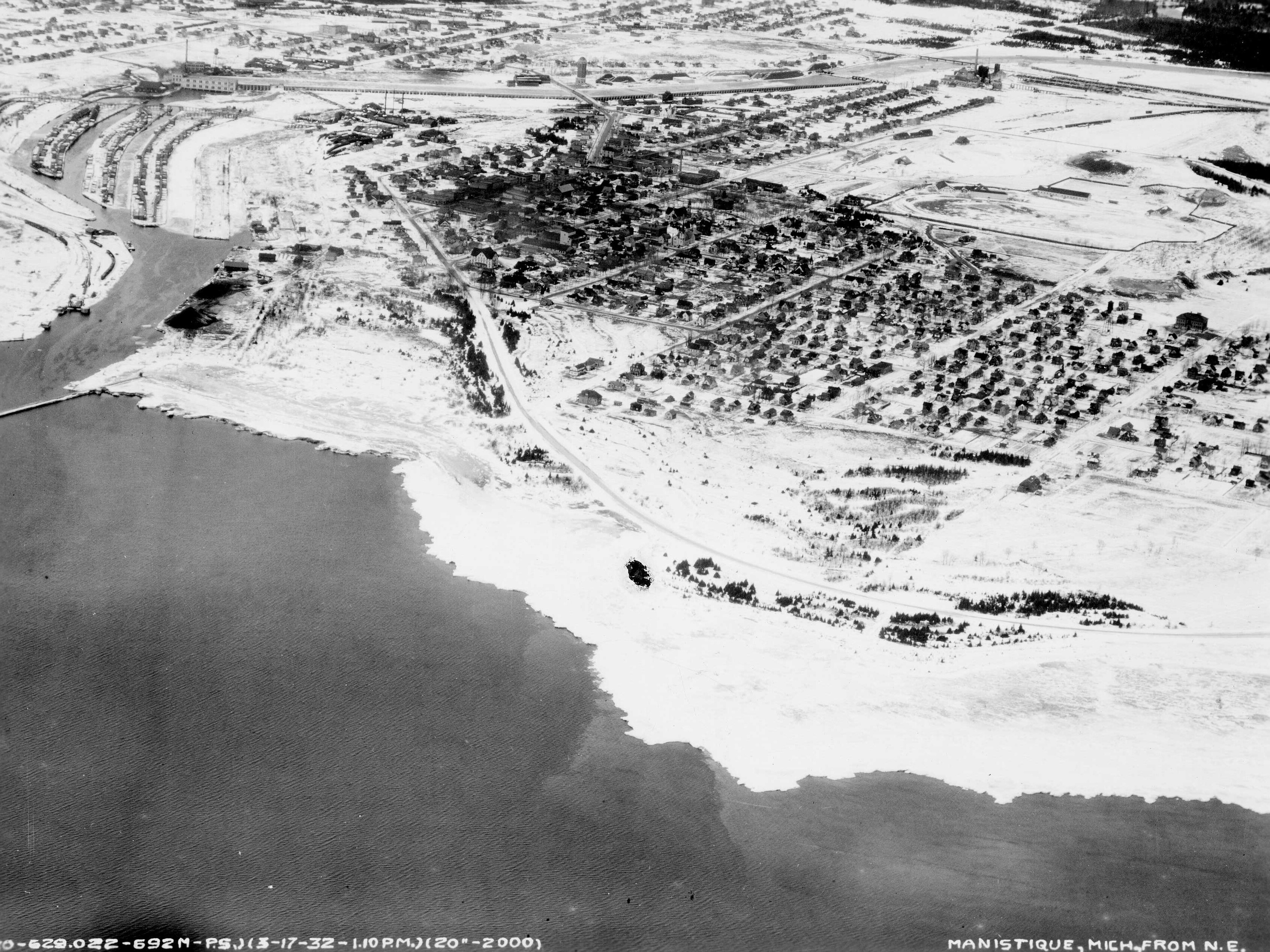
Aerial view northeast, March 1932

Originally named Eastport, Manistique replaced Onota as the county seat. Eastport was the name of the post office, but was not used for the community. Manistique was incorporated as a village in 1883 and as a city in 1901 by the state legislature. With the river originally spelled Monistique, a spelling error in the city charter led to its current spelling.

== Geography ==
According to the United States Census Bureau, the city has a total area of 3.51 square miles (9.09 km^{2}), of which 3.19 square miles (8.26 km^{2}) is land and 0.32 square miles (0.83 km^{2}) is water.

=== Climate ===
This climatic region is typified by large seasonal temperature differences, with warm to hot (and often humid) summers and cold (sometimes severely cold) winters. According to the Köppen Climate Classification system, Manistique has a humid continental climate, abbreviated "Dfb" on climate maps.

Climate data for Manistique WWTP, Michigan (1991–2020 normals, extremes 1896–present)
Month	Jan	Feb	Mar	Apr	May	Jun	Jul	Aug	Sep	Oct	Nov	Dec	Year
Record high °F (°C)	47 (8)	61 (16)	72 (22)	80 (27)	87 (31)	96 (36)	97 (36)	101 (38)	92 (33)	84 (29)	68 (20)	58 (14)	101 (38)
Mean daily maximum °F (°C)	25.1 (−3.8)	27.3 (−2.6)	35.0 (1.7)	45.4 (7.4)	57.1 (13.9)	67.2 (19.6)	73.0 (22.8)	73.5 (23.1)	66.0 (18.9)	53.3 (11.8)	40.9 (4.9)	31.0 (−0.6)	49.6 (9.8)
Daily mean °F (°C)	17.8 (−7.9)	19.0 (−7.2)	26.9 (−2.8)	37.7 (3.2)	49.0 (9.4)	59.1 (15.1)	64.8 (18.2)	64.8 (18.2)	57.8 (14.3)	45.9 (7.7)	34.5 (1.4)	24.6 (−4.1)	41.8 (5.4)
Mean daily minimum °F (°C)	10.4 (−12.0)	10.7 (−11.8)	18.7 (−7.4)	29.9 (−1.2)	40.9 (4.9)	51.0 (10.6)	56.6 (13.7)	56.2 (13.4)	49.5 (9.7)	38.6 (3.7)	28.2 (−2.1)	18.1 (−7.7)	34.1 (1.2)
Record low °F (°C)	−25 (−32)	−33 (−36)	−31 (−35)	−7 (−22)	19 (−7)	27 (−3)	32 (0)	31 (−1)	19 (−7)	17 (−8)	−6 (−21)	−25 (−32)	−33 (−36)
Average precipitation inches (mm)	1.70 (43)	1.37 (35)	1.85 (47)	2.84 (72)	2.98 (76)	3.22 (82)	3.43 (87)	3.10 (79)	3.75 (95)	3.98 (101)	2.62 (67)	2.42 (61)	33.26 (845)
Source: NOAA

== Demographics ==
Historical population
Census	Pop.	Note	%±
1880	693		—
1890	2,940		324.2%
1900	4,126		40.3%
1910	4,722		14.4%
1920	6,380		35.1%
1930	5,198		−18.5%
1940	5,399		3.9%
1950	5,086		−5.8%
1960	4,875		−4.1%
1970	4,324		−11.3%
1980	3,962		−8.4%
1990	3,456		−12.8%
2000	3,583		3.7%
2010	3,097		−13.6%
2020	2,828		−8.7%
Source: Census Bureau. Census; 1880, 1970, 1980, 1990, 2000, 2010.

=== 2020 census ===
As of the 2020 census, Manistique had a population of 2,828. The median age was 47.6 years. 19.6% of residents were under the age of 18 and 23.7% of residents were 65 years of age or older. For every 100 females there were 85.4 males, and for every 100 females age 18 and over there were 81.9 males age 18 and over.

0.0% of residents lived in urban areas, while 100.0% lived in rural areas.

There were 1,304 households in Manistique, of which 23.2% had children under the age of 18 living in them. Of all households, 33.1% were married-couple households, 21.0% were households with a male householder and no spouse or partner present, and 36.7% were households with a female householder and no spouse or partner present. About 41.3% of all households were made up of individuals and 20.2% had someone living alone who was 65 years of age or older.

There were 1,546 housing units, of which 15.7% were vacant. The homeowner vacancy rate was 3.6% and the rental vacancy rate was 10.1%.

Racial composition as of the 2020 census
Race	Number	Percent
White	2,315	81.9%
Black or African American	6	0.2%
American Indian and Alaska Native	267	9.4%
Asian	15	0.5%
Native Hawaiian and Other Pacific Islander	1	0.0%
Some other race	4	0.1%
Two or more races	220	7.8%
Hispanic or Latino (of any race)	51	1.8%

== Infrastructure ==
=== Transportation ===
- US 2
- M-94
- Indian Trails provides daily intercity bus service between St. Ignace and Ironwood, Michigan.
- Manistique is serviced by the Schoolcraft County Airport (KISQ)

== Gallery ==
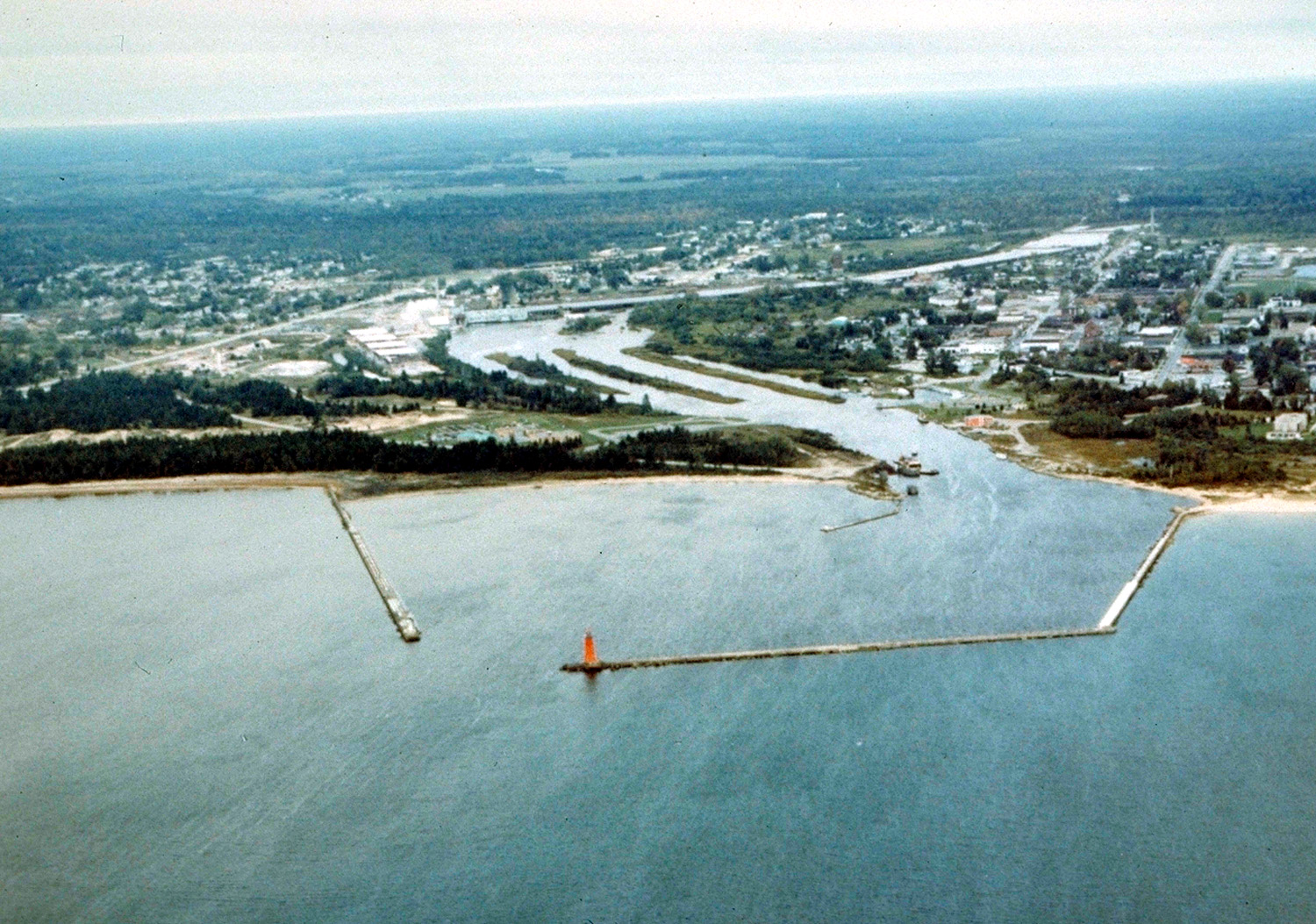
Aerial view of Manistique showing Manistique River

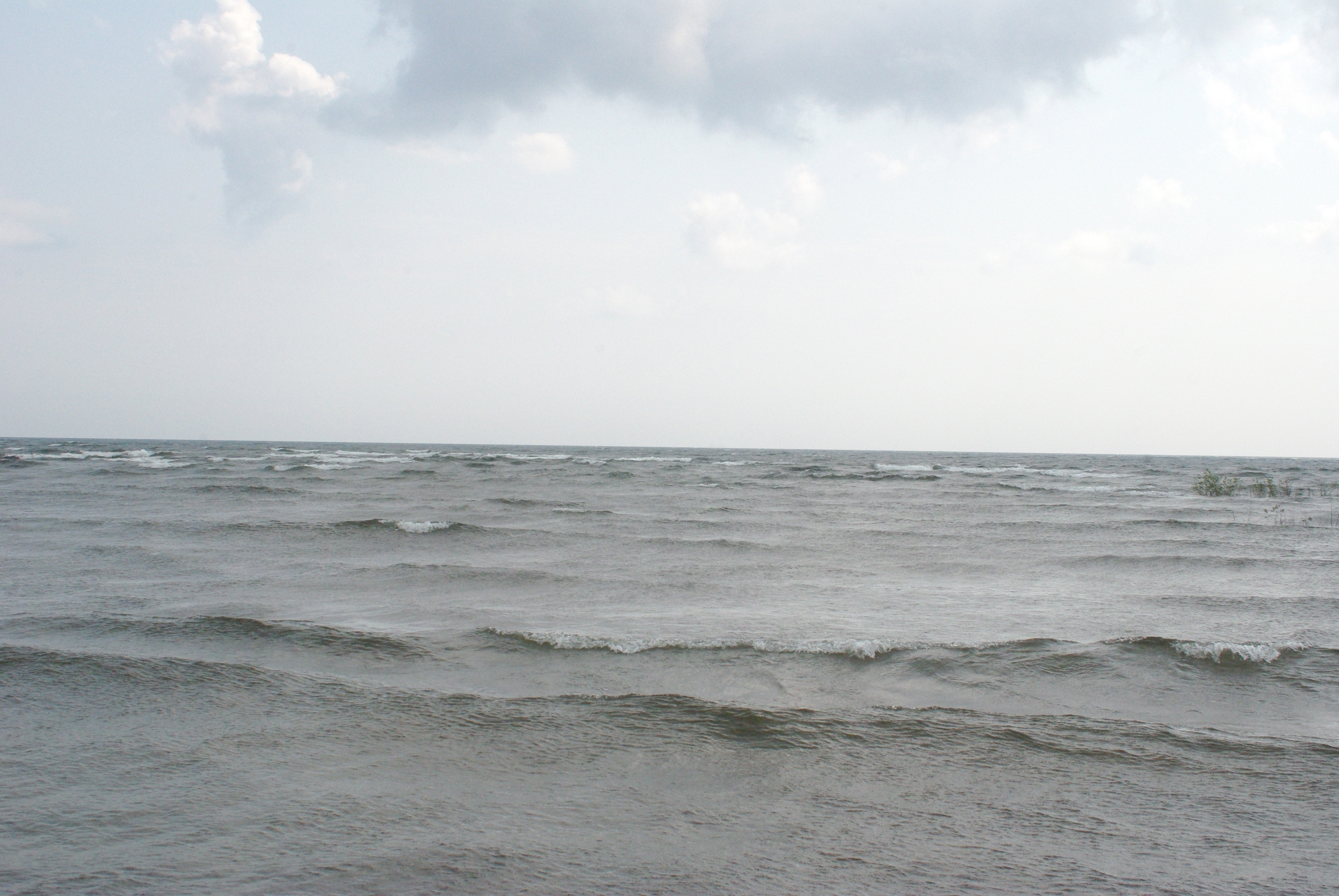
Lake Michigan looking south from the Manistique Boardwalk

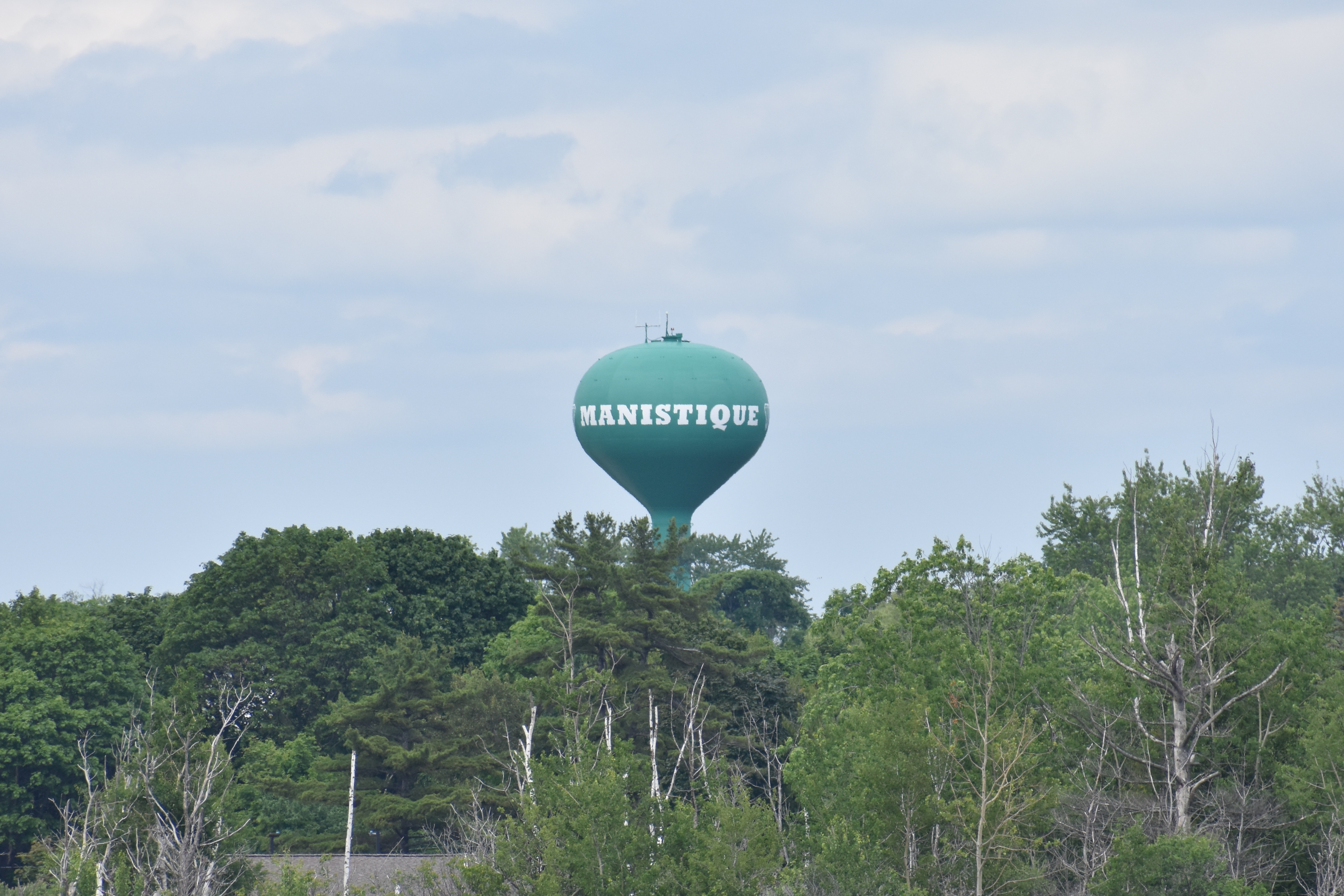
Manistique's water tower
