= Schoolcraft County Airport =

Airport in Michigan, United States

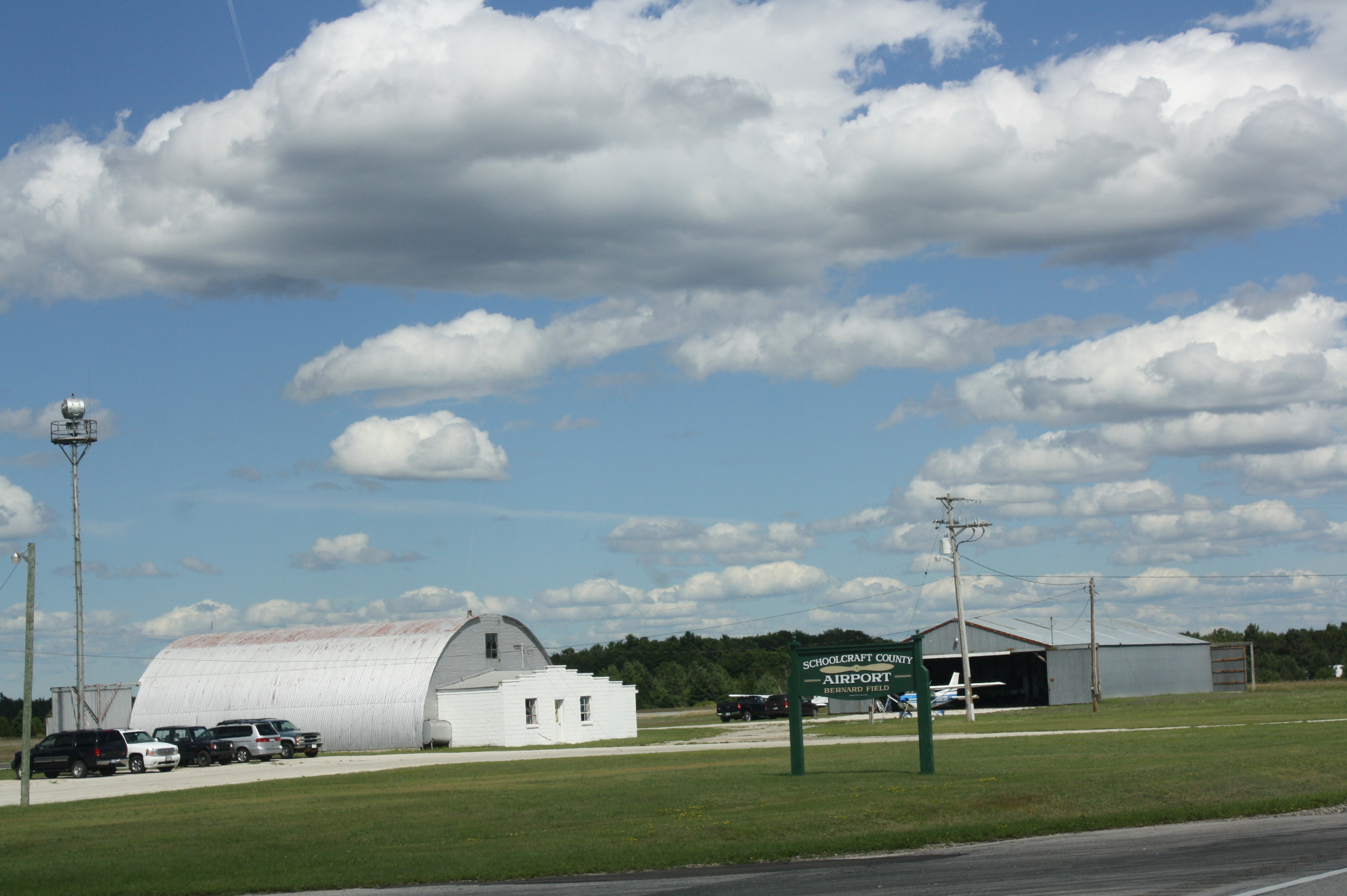
- Sign and hangars
- IATA: ISQ; ICAO: KISQ; FAA LID: ISQ

Summary
- Airport type: Public
- Owner: Schoolcraft County
- Serves: Manistique, Michigan
- Time zone: UTC−05:00 (-5)
  - Summer (DST): UTC−04:00 (-4)
- Elevation AMSL: 684 ft / 208 m
- Coordinates: 45°58′28″N 086°10′18″W

Map
- Location of airport in Michigan ISQ (the United States)

Runways
Direction	Length		Surface
Direction	ft	m	Surface
10/28	5,001	1,524	Asphalt
1/19	2,501	762	Asphalt

Statistics
- Based aircraft (2023): 6
- Source: Federal Aviation Administration

Schoolcraft County Airport (IATA: ISQ, ICAO: KISQ, FAA LID: ISQ) is a county-owned public-use airport located 3 miles (5 km) northeast of the central business district of Manistique, Michigan, a city in Schoolcraft County, Michigan, United States. It is included in the Federal Aviation Administration (FAA) National Plan of Integrated Airport Systems for 2017–2021, in which it is categorized as a basic general aviation facility.

The airport received $20,000 from the US Department of Transportation in 2020 as part of the CARES Act to help mitigate the effects of the COVID-19 pandemic.

== Facilities and aircraft ==
Schoolcraft County Airport covers an area of 335 acres (135 ha) at an elevation of 684 feet (208 m) above mean sea level. It has two runways: 10/28 is 5,001 by 100 feet (1,524 m × 30 m) with an asphalt surface with approved GPS approaches, while runway 1/19 is 2,501 by 50 feet (762 m × 15 m) with an asphalt surface.

The airport has an FBO that sells avgas and jet fuel as well as a lounge, rest rooms, and limited amenities.

As of February 2023, the airport had no recorded data regarding aircraft operations for the previous 12 months. There are 6 aircraft based at this airport, all single-engine airplanes.

== See also ==
- List of airports in Michigan
- List of airports in Michigan's Upper Peninsula
