= Manistique Pumping Station =

- U.S. National Register of Historic Places
- Michigan State Historic Site
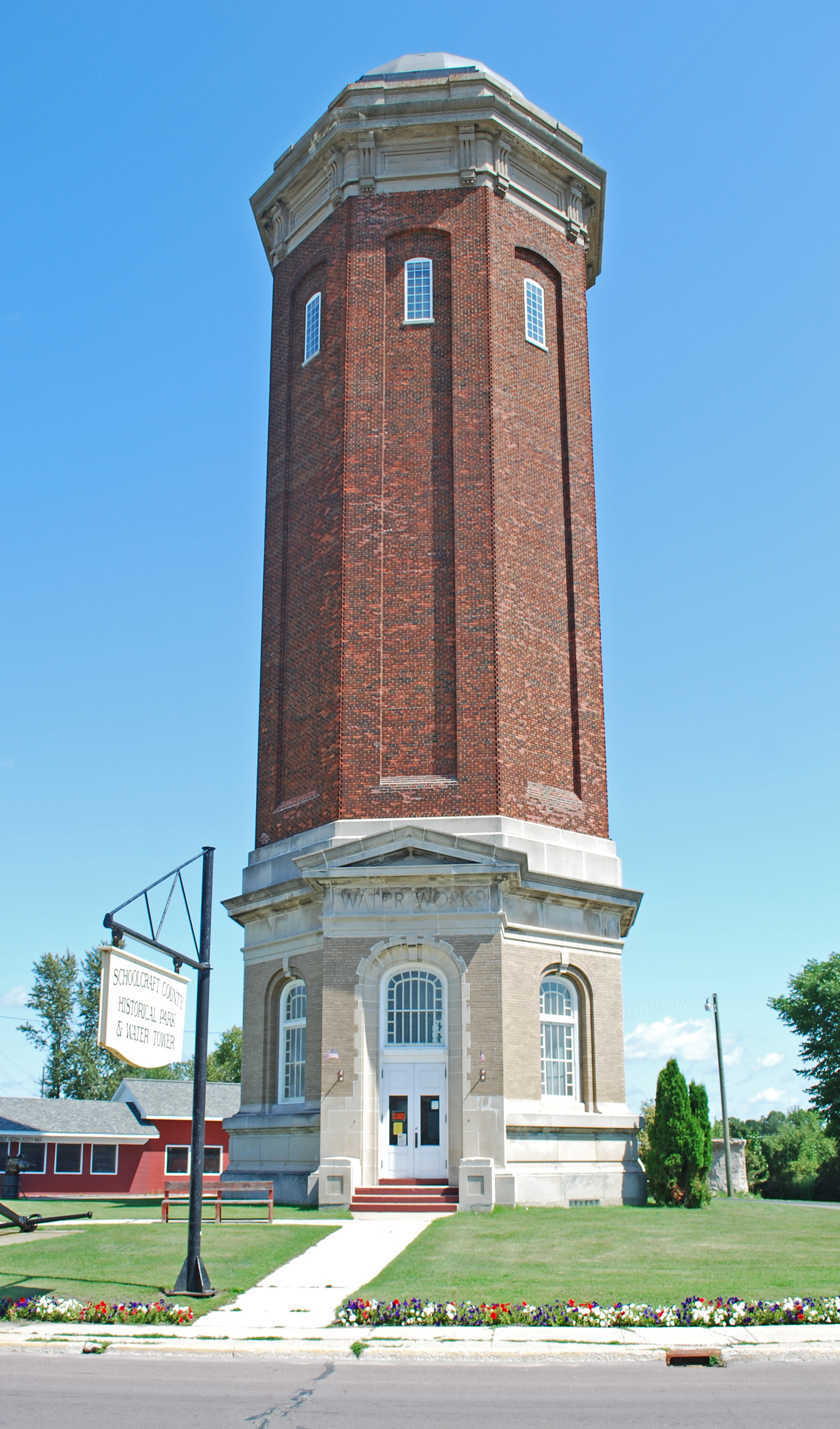
- Interactive map
- Location: Deer St., Manistique, Michigan
- Coordinates: 45°57′47″N 86°15′6″W
- Built: 1922
- Architect: Fridolf Danielson
- Architectural style: Romanesque
- NRHP reference No.: 81000316

Significant dates
- Added to NRHP: October 26, 1981
- Designated MSHS: March 19, 1980

The Manistique Pumping Station is an industrial waterworks building located on Deer Street in Manistique, Michigan. It was listed on the National Register of Historic Places in 1981.

== History ==
In the early part of the 20th century, the city of Manistique expanded and renovated their water system. However, by 1920, the system was deemed inadequate for firefighting. It was recommended that the city borrow $97,000 to build a new 200,000 gallon water tower and pumping station, as well as building a nearby dam and improving the distribution system. A bond was approved by voters, and construction of the tower began in June 1921. The system was finally complete in September 1922.

The system constructed was in use until 1954, when a new pumping station was put into operation. The structure was used for offices and as a comfort station until 1973, when the Schoolcraft Historical Society took the building over. It was placed on the state historical register in 1979 and on the National Register of Historic Places in 1981. The tower currently serves as the Schoolcraft County Museum and part of the Schoolcraft County Historical Park.

The tower is notable for the architectural approach to the design of the fundamentally utilitarian structure.

== Description ==
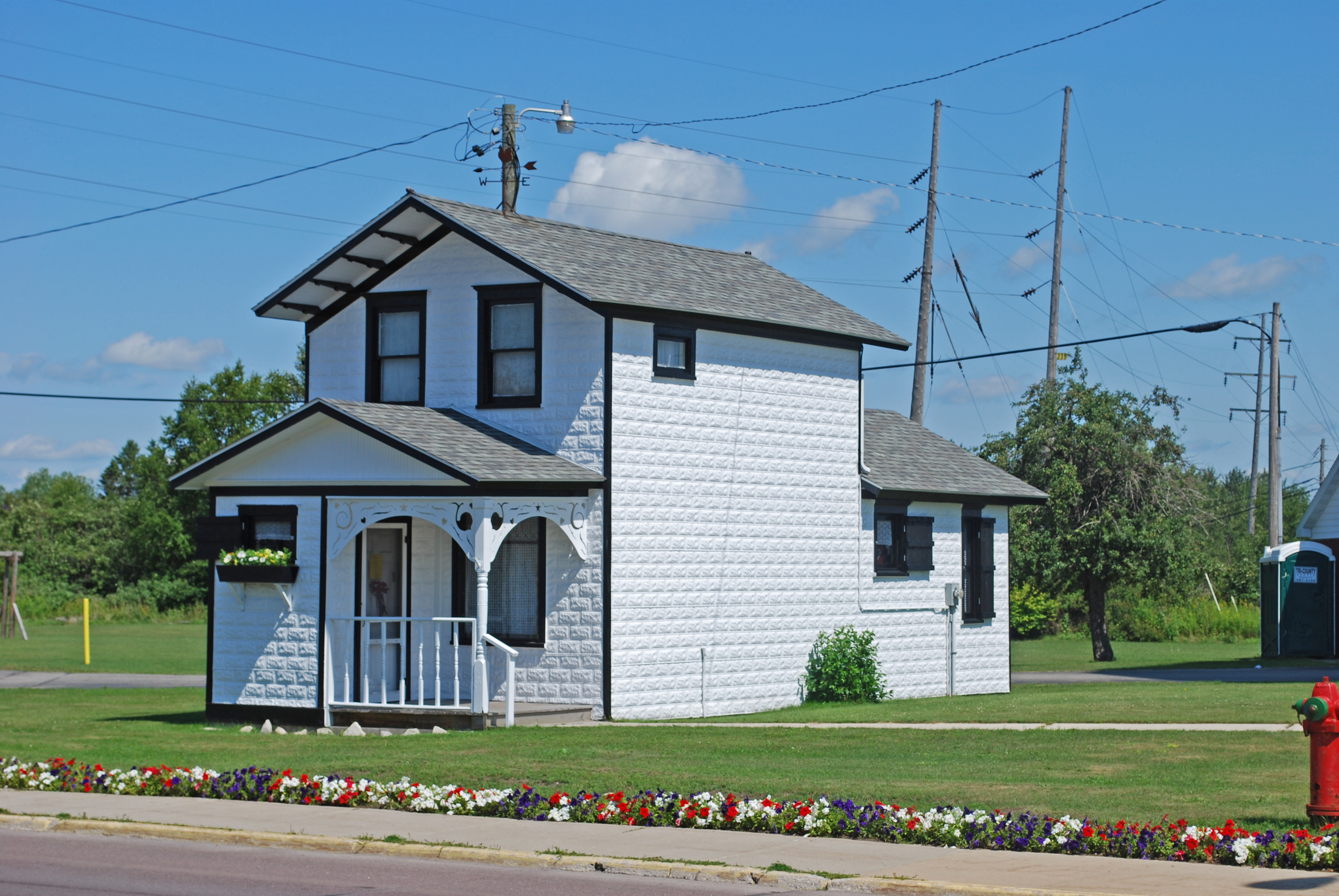
Station House

The Manistique Pumping Station is 38 feet wide on the outside, 33 feet wide inside, and 137 feet high. It housed 200,000 gallons of water in an internal steel tank 30 feet in diameter and 44 feet high. The exterior of the tower is octagonal, and the interior has 16 sides, strengthening the eight exterior corners that supported the weight of the water tank. The building is primarily faced with red brick with limestone trim, and sits on a concrete foundation. Casement windows near the top of the tower sit beneath a decorative frieze. The domed roof is made of copper.
