= Manistique East Breakwater Light =

Lighthouse in Michigan, United States

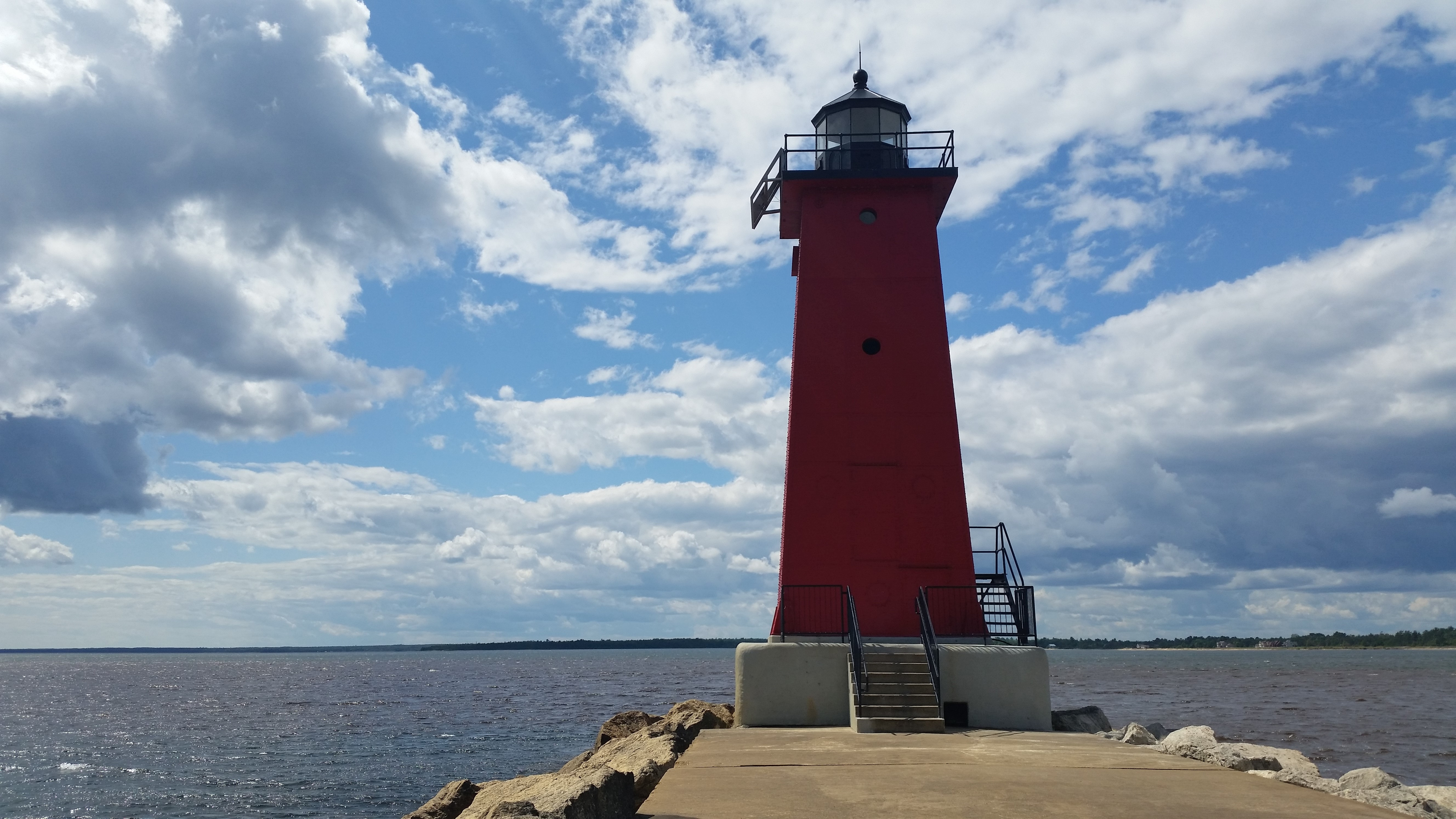
- Manistique East Breakwater Lighthouse
- Location: Manistique, Michigan
- Coordinates: 45°56′41.2296″N 86°14′51.5544″W

Tower
- Constructed: 1916
- Foundation: Concrete pier
- Construction: Steel
- Automated: 1969
- Height: 11 m (36 ft)
- Shape: Square pyramidal
- Markings: Red with black lantern
- Heritage: National Register of Historic Places listed place

Light
- First lit: 1916
- Focal height: 15 m (49 ft)
- Lens: Fourth-order Fresnel (original)
- Range: 10 mn
- Characteristic: Iso R 6s
- Manistique East Breakwater Light
- U.S. National Register of Historic Places
- Area: less than one acre
- Architect: U.S. Lighthouse Service
- MPS: Light Stations of the United States MPS
- NRHP reference No.: 05000980
- Added to NRHP: September 6, 2005

The Manistique East Breakwater Light is a lighthouse located in the harbor of Manistique, Michigan. It was listed on the National Register of Historic Places in 2005.

== History ==
At the beginning of the 20th century, Manistique was a boom town, with timber and pig iron shipping from the harbor daily. However, the harbor itself was protected only by timber crib piers originally constructed in the 1870s. However, by 1910, leaders in Manistique managed to convince the Federal government of the financial importance of the harbor, and an Army Corps of Engineers harbor expert was sent to Manistique to draw up plans for a concrete breakwater structure. The contract to construct the breakwaters was awarded to the Greiling Brothers Company, and construction was started in 1910.

At the same time, George Putnam, the newly appointed Commissioner of lighthouses, recommended the erection of lights on the breakwater. In 1912, the Lighthouse Service erected temporary range lights on one of the piers. Funding for permanent lights was approved in 1913, and by 1914 permanent lights on the west breakwater were complete. The east breakwater itself was not completed until 1915, at which time work began on the east breakwater light and a station keeper's house at the foot of the breakwater. Construction was completed in August, and the new light was lit on August 17, 1916.

As the century progressed, Manistique's importance as a port waned. The light was automated in 1969, and the original Fourth Order Fresnel lens was replaced with a 12-inch (300 mm) Tidelands Signal acrylic optic. In 2000, the Corps of Engineers replaced the concrete breakwater with rip rap.

In 2012, efforts were made under the National Historic Lighthouse Preservation Act of 2000 to convey the lighthouse to an eligible entity at no cost. When no such entity assumed stewardship of the lighthouse, it was made available for sale via GSA Auctions. The auction closed July 15, 2013, and the lighthouse was bought by a private individual.

== Description ==
The Manistique East Breakwater Light is a square-plan tower approximately 38 feet tall on a cast concrete foundation. The tower is made of prefabricated steel plates bolted together and lagged to the foundation. It is surmounted by a square gallery with a decagonal cast iron lantern which contains an electrically powered fixed red Fourth Order Fresnel lens.
