= Onota (beetle) =

Scientific classification
- Domain: Eukaryota
- Kingdom: Animalia
- Phylum: Arthropoda
- Class: Insecta
- Order: Coleoptera
- Suborder: Adephaga
- Family: Carabidae
- Subfamily: Lebiinae
- Tribe: Lebiini
- Subtribe: Calleidina
- Genus: Onota; Chaudoir, 1872

Genus of beetles

Onota is a genus of beetles in the family Carabidae, containing the following species:

- Onota angulicollis (Reiche, 1842)
- Onota bicolor Chaudoir, 1872
- Onota elongata Chaudoir, 1872
- Onota floridana G.Horn, 1881
- Onota fulvella Bates, 1884
- Onota limbipennis Maindron, 1906
- Onota longipennis Maindron, 1906
- Onota rutilans Chaudoir, 1872
- Onota tenuicincta Chaudoir, 1872
- Onota vitticollis Maindron, 1872
