= Fox River (Michigan) =

Tributary of the Manistique River near Seney, Upper Peninsula of Michigan

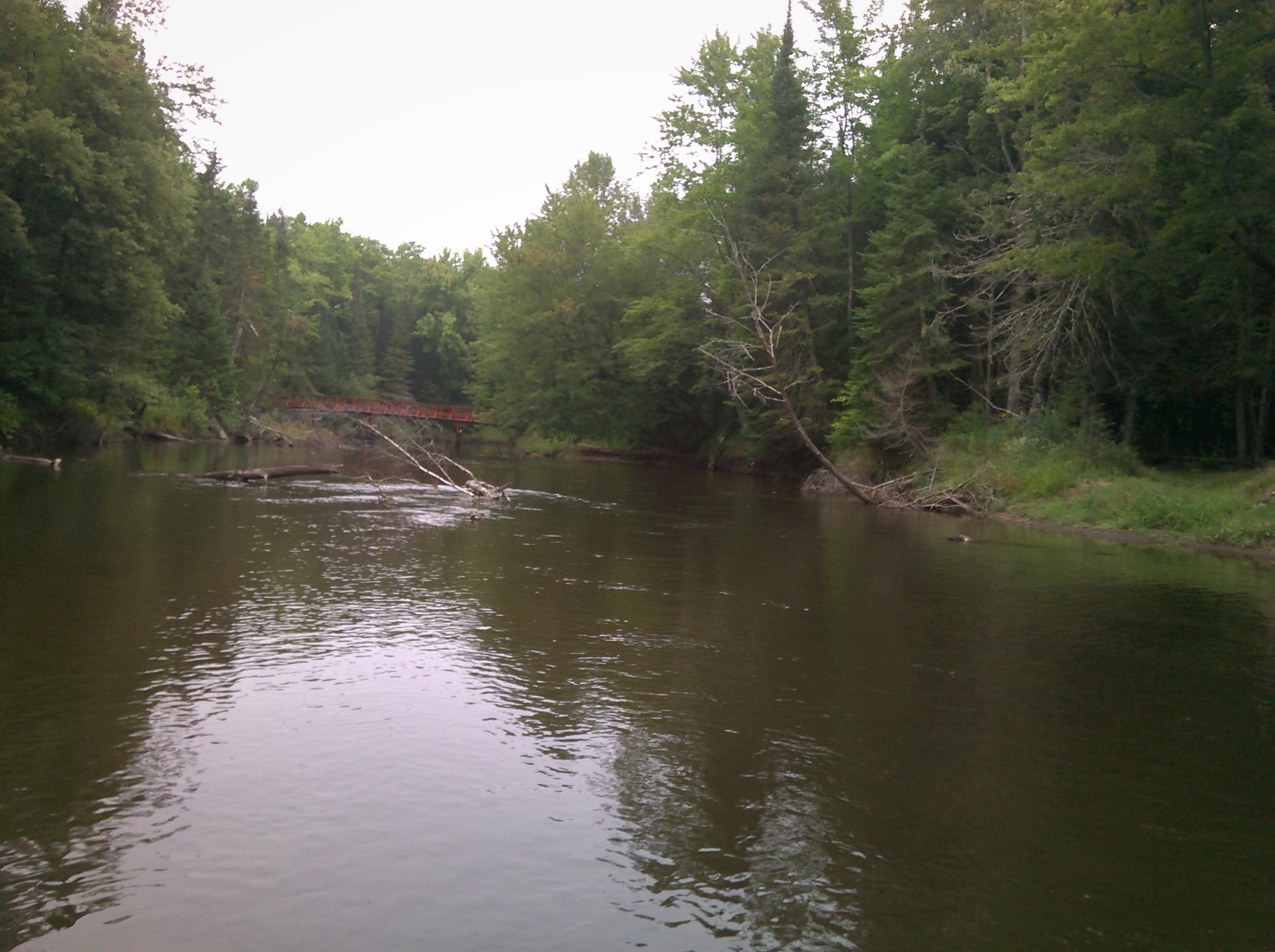

Location
- Country: United States
- State: Michigan
- County: Schoolcraft

Physical characteristics
- Source: Interior wetlands and springs
  - location: Schoolcraft County, Michigan, U.S.
- Mouth: Manistique River
  - location: Schoolcraft County, Michigan, U.S.

The Fox River is a clear, meandering stream in Schoolcraft County on Michigan’s Upper Peninsula. It flows through wetlands and mixed forest near Seney and joins the Manistique River, which ultimately drains to Lake Michigan.

== Course ==
Headwaters arise in peatlands and spring-fed wetlands in the Seney area. The river follows a gentle gradient through alder swales and mixed conifer–hardwood forest before entering the Manistique River. USGS hydrography shows a sinuous planform with oxbows and short riffled sections where the channel crosses coarser substrates.

== Natural history ==
=== Geology and landforms ===
The Fox River drains the Seney sand lakeplain and associated peatlands of the central Upper Peninsula. The low gradient, organic soils, and groundwater inputs create cool, tannin-stained water, abundant oxbows, and seasonally flooded backwaters typical of the Manistique basin.

=== Plants and wildlife ===
Uplands include northern hardwoods (maple, birch, aspen) and conifers (white pine, hemlock, spruce–fir). Along the channel, alder and cedar swales, sedge meadows, and muskeg are common. Cold- to cool-water fishes occur by reach; anglers should consult current Michigan regulations for local seasons and designations.

== In literature ==
The Fox River near Seney is widely recognized as the field setting that informed Ernest Hemingway’s short story “Big Two-Hearted River”; despite the title, the author drew on fishing experiences based in the Fox/Seney area and nearby Upper Peninsula streams.

== See also ==
- Manistique River
- Seney, Michigan
- List of rivers of Michigan
