= Onota, Au Train Township, Michigan =

- Bay Furnace
- U.S. National Register of Historic Places
- Michigan State Historic Site
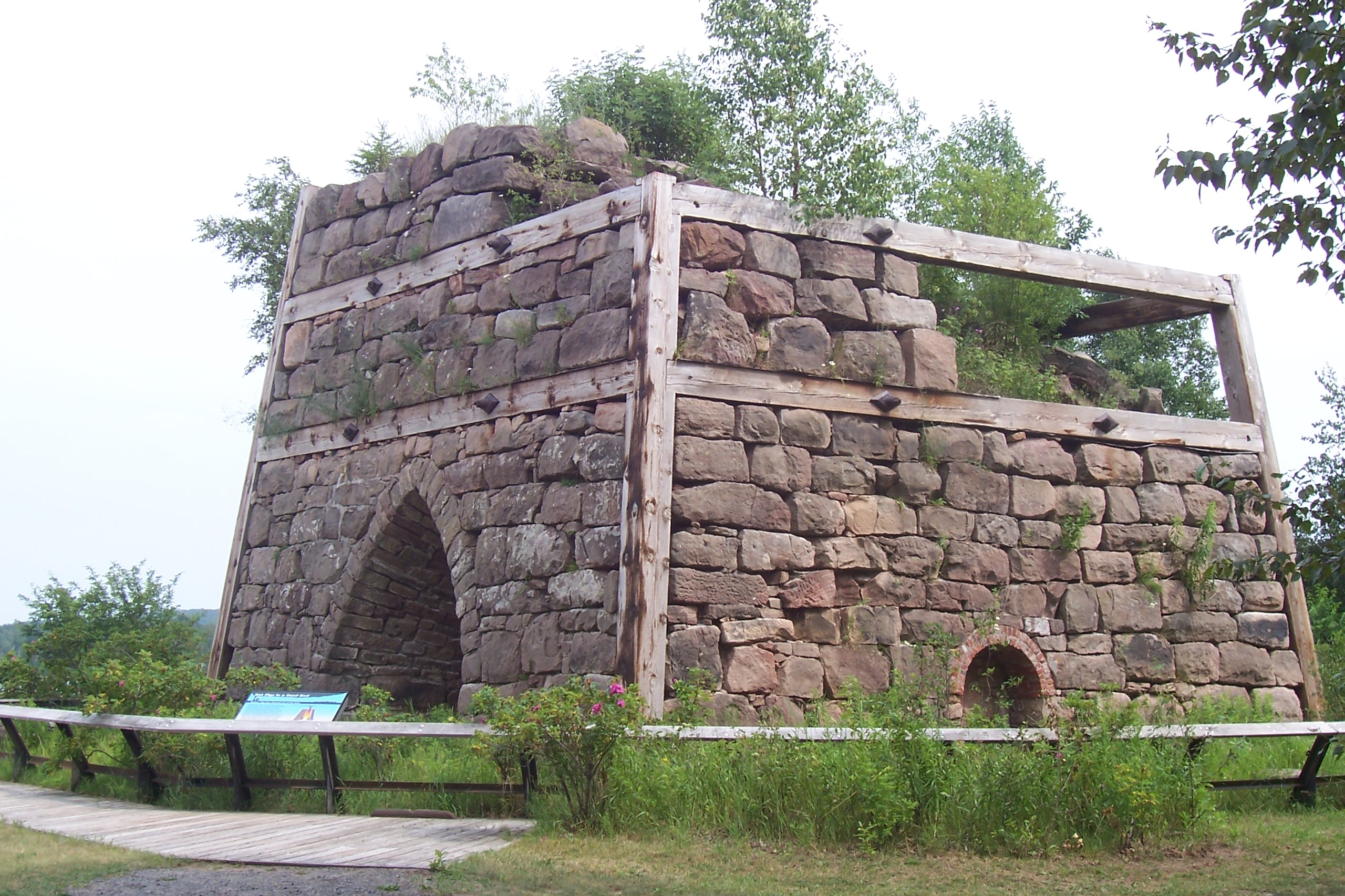
- Reconstructed furnace

- Location within Michigan Location within the United States
- Interactive map
- Nearest city: Christmas, Michigan
- Coordinates: 46°26′27″N 86°42′21″W
- Area: less than one acre
- Built: 1869
- NRHP reference No.: 71000382

Significant dates
- Added to NRHP: September 30, 1971
- Designated MSHS: January 22, 1971

Onota was a village in the Upper Peninsula of the U.S. state of Michigan. It was located on the Grand Island Bay of Lake Superior near the present-day community of Christmas about five miles (8 km) west of Munising in Alger County. The site of Onota is within the Bay Furnace Campground and Picnic Area of the Hiawatha National Forest. The remains of Bay Furnace, a blast furnace used for smelting iron, is the only extant remnant of the town. Bay Furnace was listed on the National Register of Historic Places and designated a Michigan State Historic Site in 1971.

== History ==
Onota was originally a Native American fishing site. When Schoolcraft County was set off in 1848, Onota was designated as the first county seat. However, the first recorded settlement at that location dates from 1869, when Bay Furnace, a blast furnace used for smelting iron, was established there. A post office opened May 16, 1870, and was discontinued August 14, 1879, after a fire destroyed the village. The Onota post office was reestablished and transferred on May 18, 1881, to a mining site in Onota Township approximately 15 miles (24 km) to the west, before being discontinued on February 29, 1924.

Raw materials and supplies were unloaded from ships and pig iron was loaded onto ships docked at a pier built for that purpose which extended about 1,400 feet (430 m) into Lake Superior. Charcoal made in Onota was also transported to furnaces in and around Marquette. Iron smelting began in the spring of 1870, producing 3,498 tons of pig iron that year. In 1871, the product was 3,597 tons, and 4,900 tons in 1872. In 1872, a second stack was built and began production in December; however, its use was discontinued after one year. By 1874, 52 kilns were running in the timbered land owned by the Bay Furnace Company, and Bay Furnace Stack Number One was producing fifteen tons of pig iron per day.

By the fall of 1876, the Bay Furnace Company was bankrupt, having engaged in disputes with New York financier Samuel J. Tilden, who had financed the New York Iron Mine which provided ore to the mine.

The town was destroyed by fire in 1877, at which time it had a population of about 500, most of whom were somehow involved in supporting the operations of the furnace or the local aspects of Michigan's early iron industry. It was a dry season and the woods around Onota had been burning for several days. On May 31, a strong wind from the south drove the flames into the village and ruined it in a matter of hours. The village was not rebuilt and only ruins of the furnace kiln remained, and were later partially reconstructed on the original location. In 1948, the Cleveland-Cliffs Iron Company gave 54 acres (220,000 m^{2}) to the U.S. Forest Service for historical and recreational use. Surrounding buildings destroyed by the fire included the casting shed, charging house, machine shop, blacksmith shop, and storage sheds.

== Stack Description ==
The remnants of the blast furnace are all that remain of Onota. The Bay Furnace Stack Number One is constructed from coursed stone. It was originally 45 feet high, with a closed top, nine-foot boshes, and boilers located at the top. Stack Number Two was an iron shell on columns with 9-1/2-foot boshes. Two sets of six charcoal kilns were located two miles from the furnace, two miles apart.
