= Harbor Springs Public School District =

School district in Michigan

Address
- 800 South State Street Harbor Springs, Emmet County, Michigan, 49740; United States

District information
- Motto: Excellence in character, excellence in education
- Grades: PreKindergarten–12
- Superintendent: Scott Korpak (interim)
- Schools: 3
- Budget: $17,522,000 2021-2022 expenditures
- NCES District ID: 2617700

Students and staff
- Students: 754 (2024-2025)
- Teachers: 59.43 (on an FTE basis) (2024-2025)
- Staff: 130.4 FTE (2024-2025)
- Student–teacher ratio: 12.69 (2024-2025)

Other information
- Website: www.harborps.org

Harbor Springs Public School District is a public school district in Emmet County, in Northern Michigan. It serves Harbor Springs and the townships of Cross Village, Friendship, and West Traverse, and parts of the townships of Little Traverse, Pleasant View, and Readmond.

== History ==
The first class graduated from Harbor Springs High School in 1887. The current Harbor Springs High School was built in 1915. Additions were built at the high school around 1959 (including the gymnasium) and 1968. An extensive renovation and additions project was completed in fall 2005.

The current middle school opened in fall 2003, along with renovations to Shay Elementary next door. Shay Elementary, which served grades two through four, was demolished in 2022 and rebuilt. When the new building opened in fall 2024 for grades kindergarten through four, Blackbird Elementary, formerly an early elementary school, was repurposed as a dedicated preschool and child care center.

== Schools ==
Schools in Harbor Springs Public School District
School	Address	Notes
Harbor Springs High School	500 North Spring Street, Harbor Springs	Grades 9–12
Harbor Springs Middle School	800 South State Road, Harbor Springs	Grades 5–8
Shay Elementary	175 East Lake Street, Harbor Springs	Grades K-4
Blackbird Child Care Center	421 East Lake Street, Harbor Springs	Preschool and child care
