= Alanson Public Schools =

Public school district in Alanson, Michigan, United States

Address
- 7400 North St Alanson, Michigan, 49706-9247; United States

District information
- Grades: PK–12
- Schools: 1
- NCES District ID: 2621810

Students and staff
- Students: 232 (2021–22)
- Teachers: 18.17 (FTE)
- Student–teacher ratio: 12.77

Alanson Public Schools is a PK–12 school district, consisting of a single school, Alanson Public School, in Alanson, Michigan.

The district includes sections of Littlefield, Little Traverse, Maple River, Pleasantview townships. The district includes all of Alanson and Ponshewaing, as well as sections of Brutus and Oden.

== History ==
Kenneth T. Bordine became superintendent in 1927.

At some point there was a plan to merge Alanson into the Public Schools of Petoskey school district, but the state government vetoed the plan.

Jeff Liedel served as superintendent for a period until his 2015 retirement. That year, Dean Paul became the superintendent and the principal of the entire school.

Paul retired in 2018. That year, Rachelle Cook became the superintendent and principal.
