= Friendship Township =

Friendship Township may refer to:

- Friendship Township, Greene County, Arkansas, in Greene County, Arkansas
- Friendship Township, Michigan
- Friendship Township, Yellow Medicine County, Minnesota
