= Douglas House (Harbor Springs, Michigan) =

- James and Jean Douglas House
- U.S. National Register of Historic Places
- Location within Michigan Location within the United States
- Interactive map
- Location: 3490 S. Lake Shore Dr., Friendship Township, Michigan
- Coordinates: 45°30′4″N 85°5′51″W
- Built: 1971
- Architect: Richard Meier
- Architectural style: Modern
- NRHP reference No.: 16000232
- Added to NRHP: May 3, 2016

The James and Jean Douglas House (or just Douglas House) is a residence located at 3490 South Lake Shore Drive on the shore of Lake Michigan in Friendship Township near Harbor Springs, Michigan.

== History ==
In 1965, renowned architect Richard Meier was commissioned to design the Frederick J. Smith House in Darien, Connecticut. The house was completed in 1967 and featured on the cover of a magazine, where it was seen by James and Jean Douglas of Grand Rapids, Michigan. The Douglases contacted Meier and asked him to create a similar design in northern Michigan. Planning for the house began in 1971; the original location chosen was within an upscale gated community. However, the white color of Meier's design was rejected by the community. Rather than compromise on the color, the Douglases found another lot, nearly unbuildable due to its steep slope.

With a new location chosen construction began and was completed in 1973 after a three-year construction period. When Meier furnished the house for his clients, Jim and Jean Douglas, he designed some of the furniture himself and also used designs by Le Corbusier and Mies van der Rohe.

In 2007, the American Institute of Architects listed the Douglas House as one of the top 150 structures on its "America's Favorite Architecture" list.

In 2016, the Douglas House was added to the National Register of Historic Places. The house has remained intact, with no additions or modifications to the physical structure, and no changes to room uses or layouts.

== Description ==
The Douglas House is located on a very steep slope overlooking the lake. It is a four-story, bright white, Modern structure with a flat roof clad with redwood. The overall form of the house is a large rectangle set on end. The rear wall of the house, which faces the lake, makes extensive use of glass to provide maximum views. The house is built of redwood (vertical Tongue and Groove boards) and is almost completely white. The foundation consists of a series of pilings hammered into the earth.

The entrance on the upland side of the house is on the top floor, via a bridge. Stairways were located in the corners of the structure so that they would not block views or sunlight. The fourth floor serves as the home's entry from the bridge, and contains a large exterior deck space; another smaller deck space is above the fourth floor. Below, the third floor contains three bedrooms, a full bath and an open, built-in work desk overlooking the second-floor living room. The second floor contains the living room, a wet bar and the master bedroom. The first floor contains the dining room, kitchen, laundry and another bedroom with a full bath. A sub-level beneath the first floor contains HVAC, water/electrical services and storage.
