= Ponshewaing, Michigan =

- Census-designated place (CDP) & unincorporated community
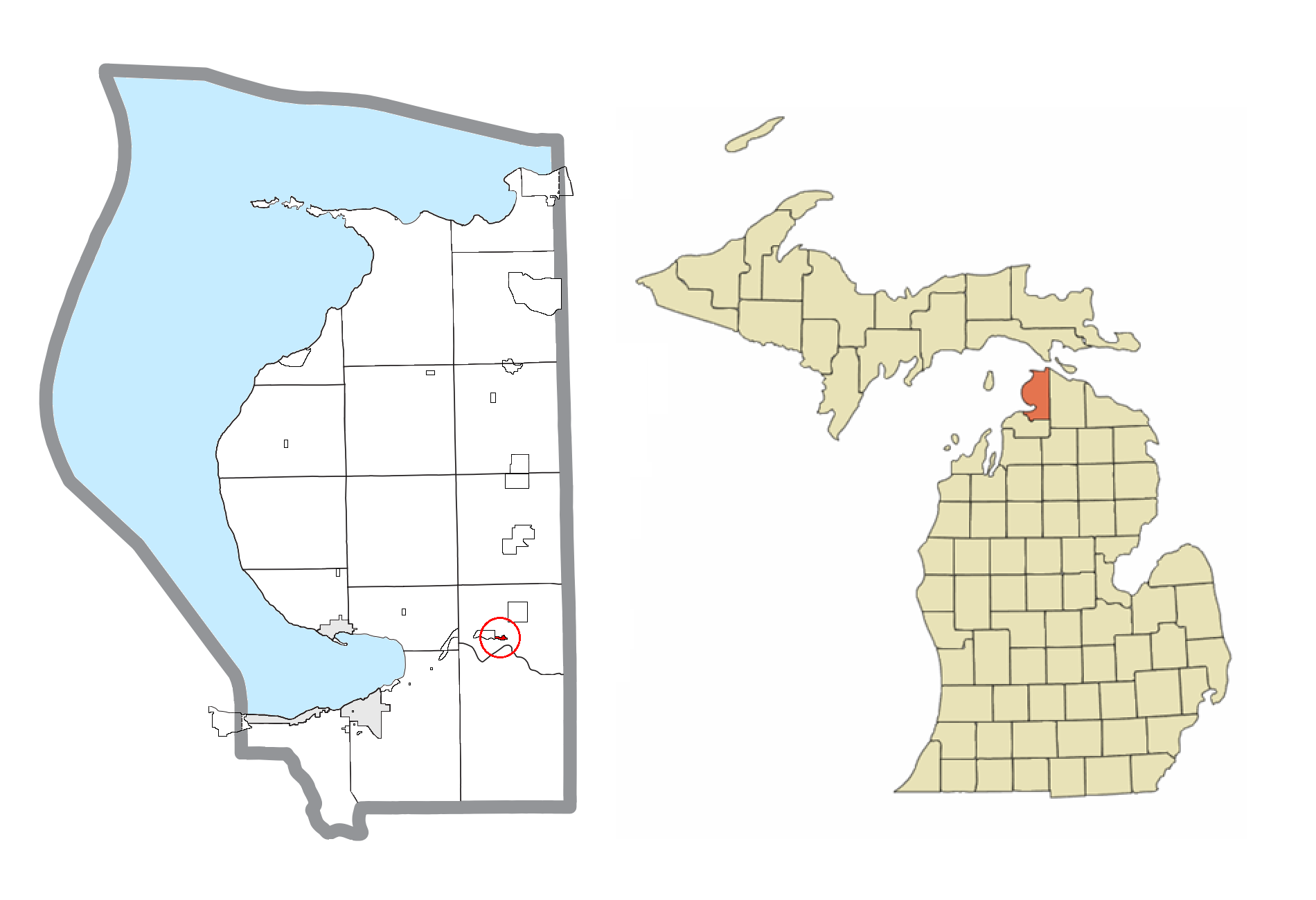
- Location within Emmet County

- Location within the state of Michigan Ponshewaing (the United States)
- Coordinates: 45°25′15″N 84°48′15″W
- Country: United States
- State: Michigan
- County: Emmet
- Township: Littlefield

Area
  - Total: 0.089 sq mi (0.23 km^{2})
  - Land: 0.089 sq mi (0.23 km^{2})
  - Water: 0 sq mi (0.00 km^{2})
- Elevation: 614 ft (187 m)

Population (2020)
  - Total: 126
  - Density: 1,432.2/sq mi (552.98/km^{2})
- Time zone: UTC-5 (Eastern (EST))
  - Summer (DST): UTC-4 (EDT)
- ZIP code(s): 49706 (Alanson)
- Area code: 231
- FIPS code: 26-65420
- GNIS feature ID: 635223

Ponshewaing (/ˈpɑːnʃəwæŋ/ PON-shə-WANG) is an unincorporated community and census-designated place (CDP) in Emmet County in the U.S. state of Michigan. As of the 2020 census, Ponshewaing had a population of 126. It is located within Littlefield Township.

== Geography ==
Ponshewaing is located in southeastern Emmet County, in Littlefield Township, on the north shore of Crooked Lake. It is bordered to the west by Oden. U.S. Route 31 passes through the community, leading southwest 9 miles (14 km) to Petoskey, the county seat, and northeast 2 miles (3 km) to Alanson.

The community of Ponshewaing was listed as a newly-organized census-designated place for the 2010 census, meaning it now has officially defined boundaries and population statistics for the first time.

According to the U.S. Census Bureau, the Ponshewaing CDP has a total area of 0.09 square miles (0.23 km^{2}), all land. Of Michigan's 212 census-designated places, Ponshewaing ranks as the smallest in terms of land area.

== Education ==
Its school district is Alanson Public Schools.

== Demographics ==
Historical population
| Census | Pop. | Note | %± |
|---|---|---|---|
| 2020 | 126 | | — |
U.S. Decennial Census
