= Sturgeon Bay, Michigan =

- Ghost town
- Location within the state of Michigan
- Coordinates: 45°40′51″N 84°58′52″W
- Country: United States
- State: Michigan
- County: Emmet
- Township: Bliss
- Settled: 1895
- Abandoned: 1913
- Elevation: 590 ft (180 m)
- Time zone: UTC-5 (Eastern (EST))
  - Summer (DST): UTC-4 (EDT)
- GNIS feature ID: 2360181

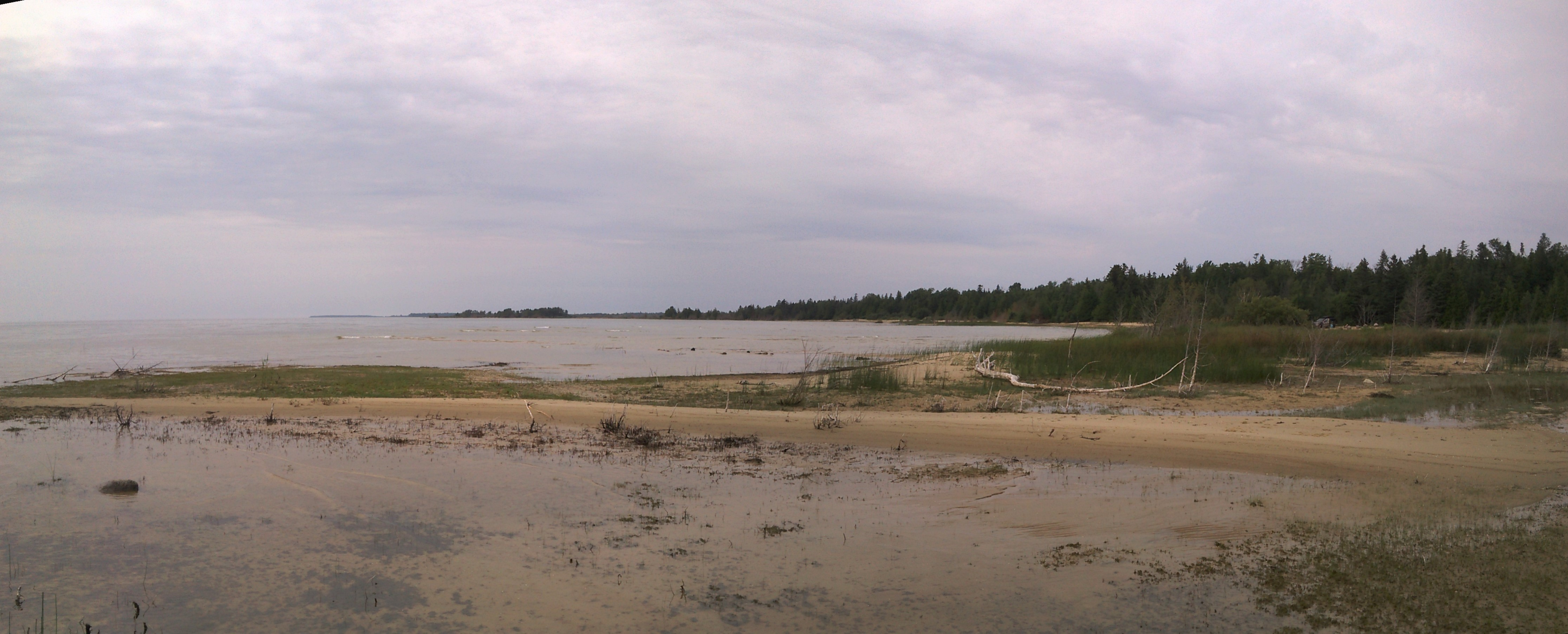
The former location of Sturgeon Bay in 2021

Sturgeon Bay was a small lumbering community in the U.S. state of Michigan, located in Bliss Township on the southern border of what is now Wilderness State Park in the northwest part of Emmet County. Almost nothing remains of Sturgeon Bay. It was located on the south shore of Sturgeon Bay, an indentation of Lake Michigan, just west of where Sturgeon Bay Trail and Lakeshore Driveintersect. Intersection is Sturgeon Bay Trail and Lake Shore Drive. M-119 terminates approximately four miles to the south of this intersection at Cross Village. See Wikipedia entry for M-119 for correct information on the northern terminus of M-119.

The first mill was founded by Albert B. Klise in 1895, and a small town grew up around it. It was a large-scale operation that deemed a logging railway necessary. A railroad, Sturgeon Bay Railway, was built from the shore of Lake Michigan east about 14 miles (23 km) to within 2 miles (3 km) of Levering. The railroad was standard gauge and was known to operate at least two Shay locomotives: SN 1984, built by the Lima Locomotive Works in 1907, the same year the railroad was built, and SN 155, built by Lima Locomotive Works in 1886. The inventor of the Shay Locomotive, Ephraim Shay, was a local in the area, living in Harbor Springs about 20 miles (32 km) to the south. They were also known to have operated a Heisler logging locomotive. A visible remnant of the railroad grade is one quarter mile east of the Sturgeon Bay Trail and M-119 intersection. The grade was used for the power lines from this point out to Lake Michigan, and the grades can be seen at many places in the area. The grade was still included on state surveyor maps as late as 1957.

A post office was established on March 28, 1908, with Edward Ringler as postmaster. The U.S. Geological Survey gives the location as 45°40′51″N 84°58′52″W. The office operated until December 15, 1912.

The town once boasted a saw mill, blacksmith shop, small general store, and a boarding house in addition to the post office. The exact date the mill closed is unknown, but it occurred sometime in 1913. Whether it was intentionally dismantled or was simply swept away by time is not known. Only a handful of known photographs of the town survive. The date the railroad was pulled is also unknown, but it was likely before 1920. A few dock pilings are still visible from the air, but most of the town was reclaimed by the sand dunes on which it was built.

Albert Klise was the mayor of the city of Petoskey, Michigan, when a fire destroyed much of the village of Cross Village, on September 27, 1918. Sturgeon Bay, now an abandoned logging village, and still under the ownership of the mayor, was offered to many of the 300 homeless people to use as shelter.

The beach in which this town was located is now home to the endangered piping plover, with many sections of the shoreline roped off to protect its nesting sites.
