= Kilwins =

American confectionery chain

Coordinates: 45.381997°N 84.944692°W

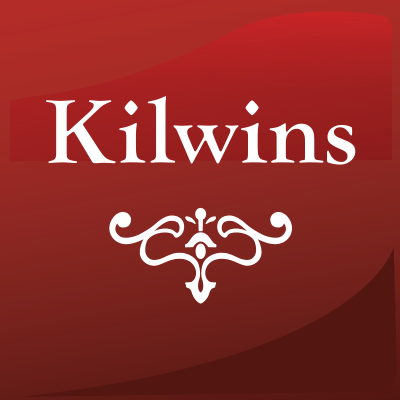
- Type: Privately held company
- Industry: Confectionery production
- Founded: Petoskey, Michigan (1947; 79 years ago)
- Founder: Don & Katy Kilwin
- Headquarters: Petoskey, Michigan, United States
- Number of locations: 146
- Area served: United States
- Key people: Brian Britton, CEO
- Products: Chocolates, ice cream
- Owner: Levine Leichtman Capital Partners
- Website: kilwins.com

Kilwins, also known as Kilwins Chocolates, is an American company, specializing in confectioneries such as candy, ice cream, and fudge. In 1947, Katy and Don Kilwin opened the first location in Petoskey, Michigan, and the company is still headquartered there. There are 178 locations in the United States, across 30 states.

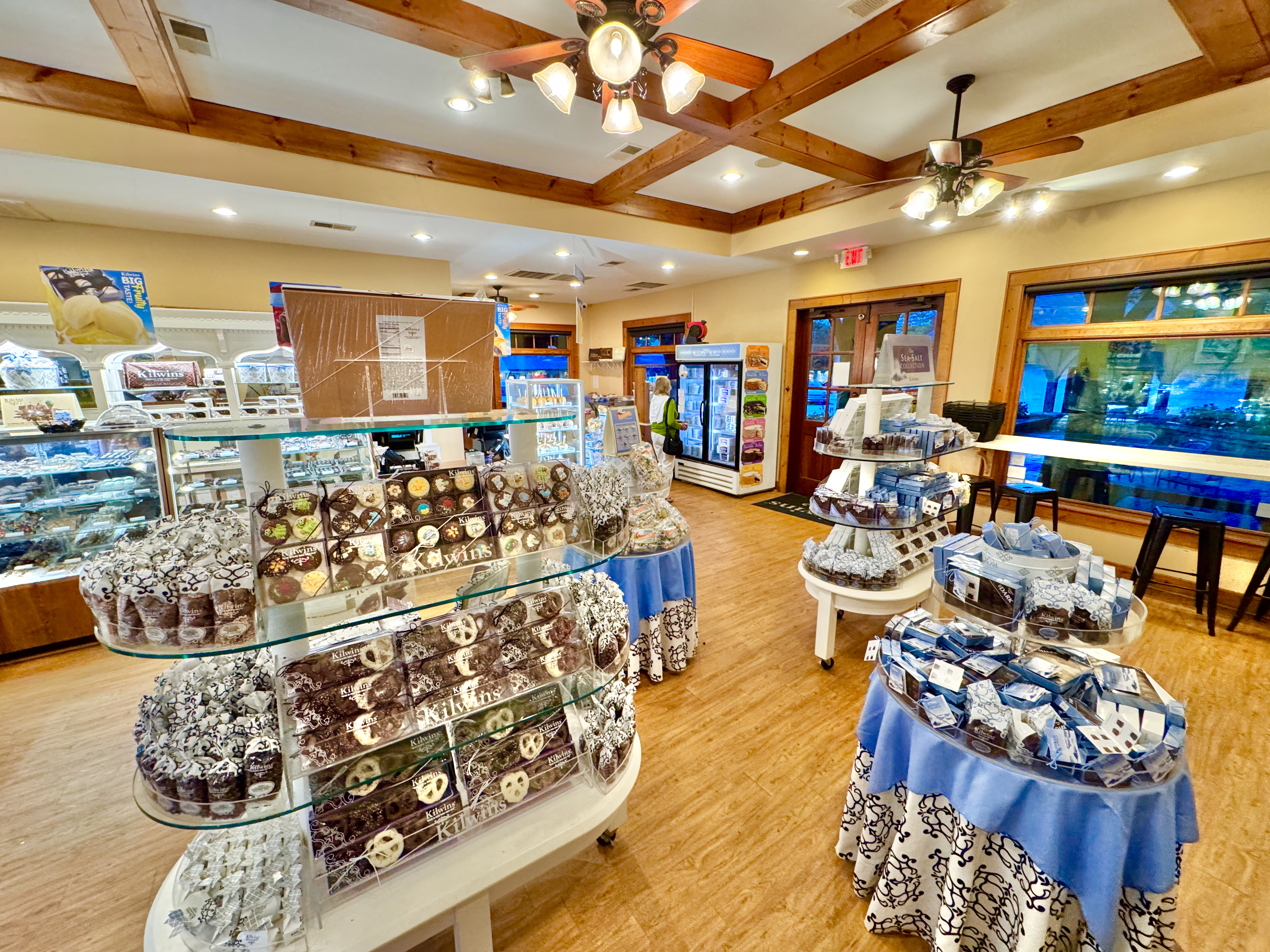
Interior of a typical Kilwins location

== History ==
Kilwins was founded in 1947 as "Kilwin's Candies and Gifts" by Don and Katy Kilwin in Petoskey. The company began as a mom-and-pop bakery and candy operation, and the next year expanded to making fudge in-house. They sold off the bakery portion of their business in 1971 so that they could concentrate on candy production. In 1976, a second branch was opened in Traverse City, Michigan by Jim Szocinski, who first worked for the company in 1961.

The company was sold to Wayne and Lorene Rose in 1978, and three years later, they began to franchise. In 1995, the company was purchased by Don and Robin McCarty. By 2007, the couple had expanded the business to more than 60 locations. In March 2023, the company was sold to Levine Leichtman Capital Partners, a private-equity group based in Los Angeles.

As of August 2025, there are 178 stores nationwide in 30 states. About half of these locations are in popular tourist destinations, such as near resorts and at beaches. The company owns select franchises located across the country, however the vast majority of locations are independently operated and are not owned by the corporation. The company is currently in the process of selling more franchises and expanding the number of company–owned locations across the country.

Entrepreneur magazine in 2018 listed Kilwins in the top 100 of its Franchise 500 Rankings.

== Production ==
The company is best known for chocolates, fudge, and ice cream, but also makes other sweets including barks, brittles, candies, clusters, taffy, truffles, and chocolate-covered pretzels, OREO® Cookies, and Rice Krispies. The stores allow customers to watch staff produce the confectioneries. The company uses marble tables, which cools the fudge from the bottom. Kilwins has been described by some as 'old fashioned sweets'. In 2018, Kilwins was one of the food vendors for Lollapalooza.
