= Springvale Township, Michigan =

- Civil township
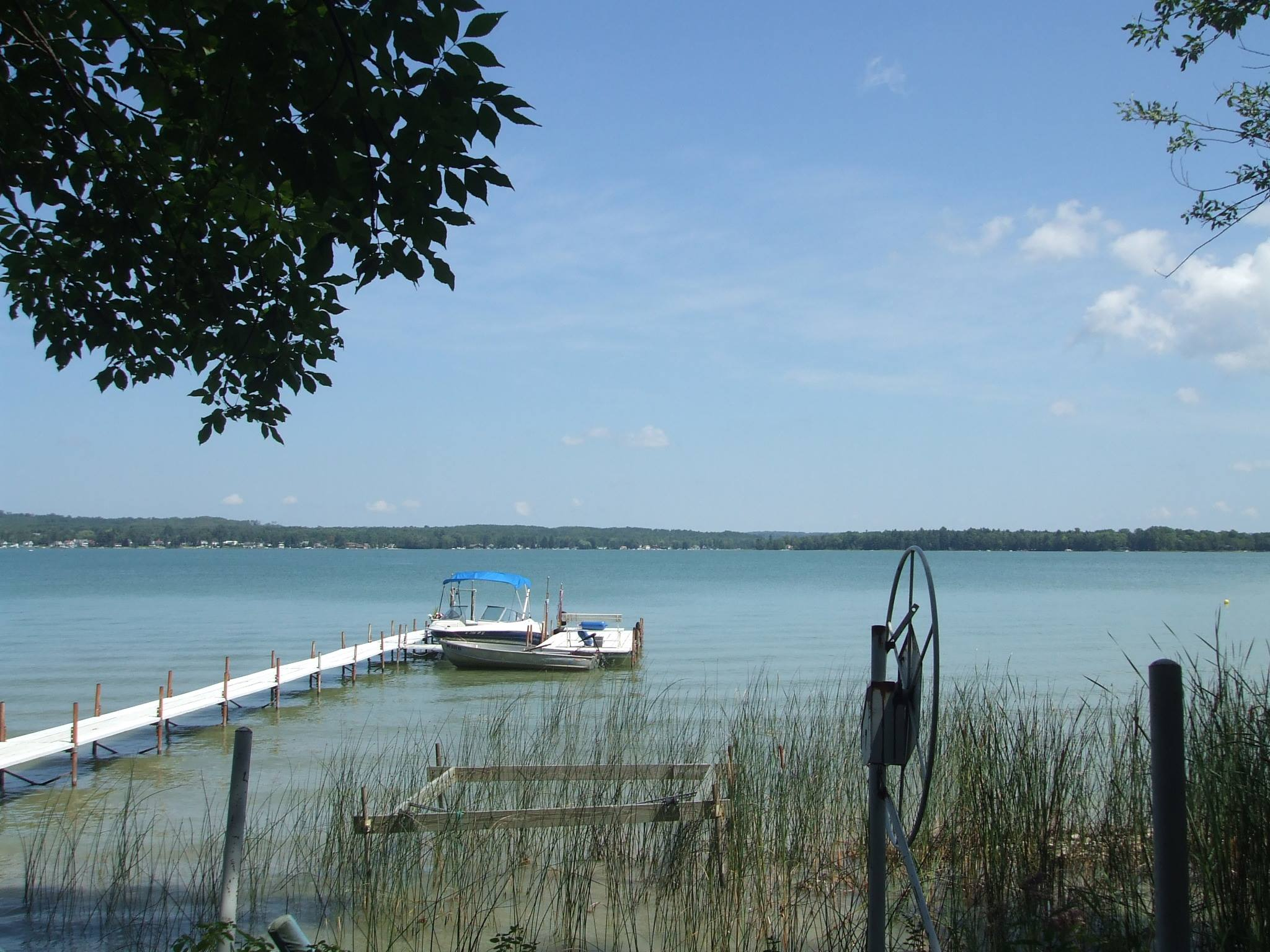
- Crooked Lake

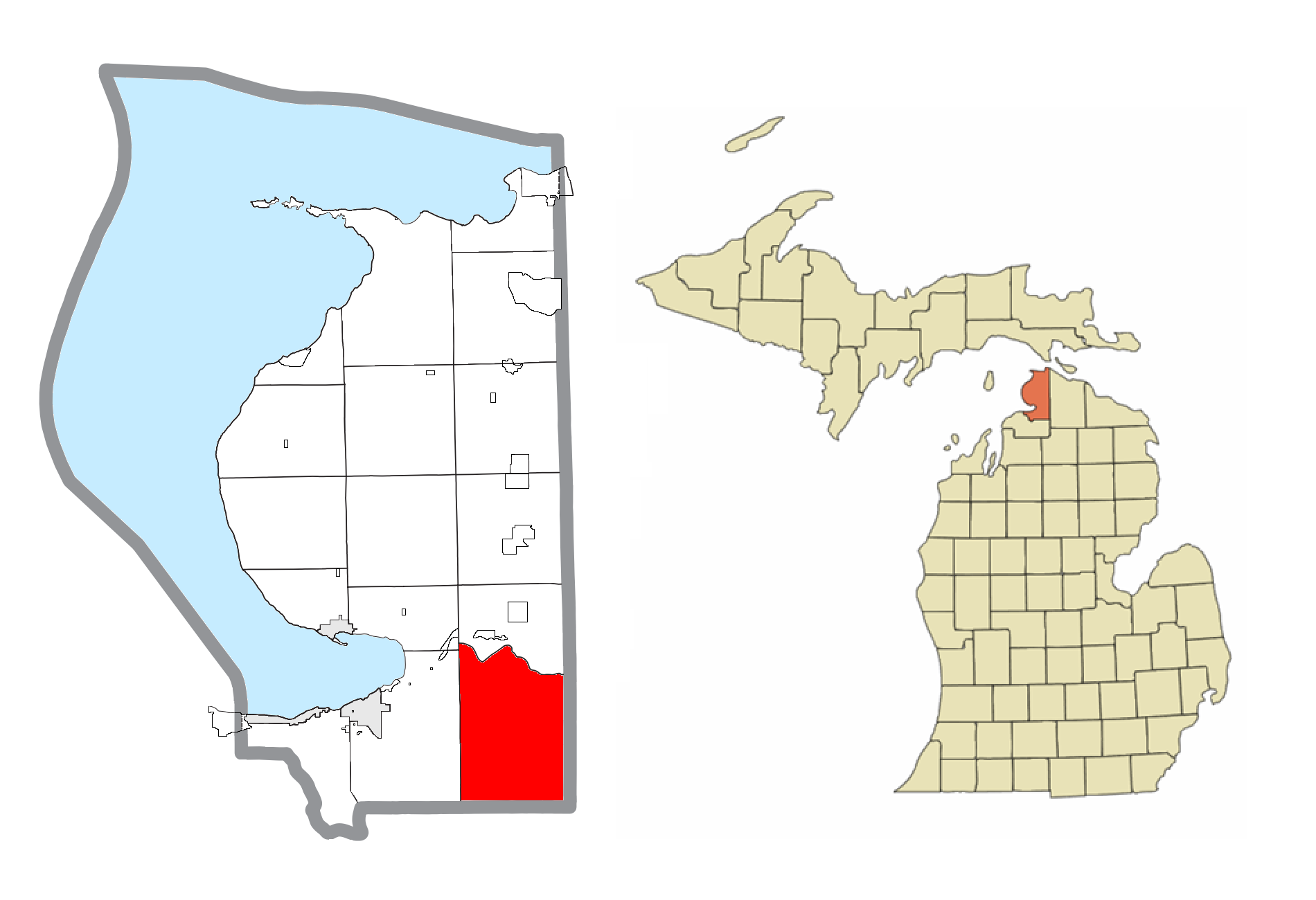
- Location within Emmet County

- Location within the state of Michigan Springvale Township (the United States)
- Coordinates: 45°21′09″N 84°47′30″W
- Country: United States
- State: Michigan
- County: Emmet

Government
  - Supervisor: Tom Whipp
  - Clerk: Patricia McCune

Area
  - Total: 47.06 sq mi (121.9 km^{2})
  - Land: 44.71 sq mi (115.8 km^{2})
  - Water: 2.35 sq mi (6.1 km^{2})
- Elevation: 856 ft (261 m)

Population (2020)
  - Total: 2,146
  - Density: 47.9/sq mi (18.5/km^{2})
- Time zone: UTC-5 (Eastern (EST))
  - Summer (DST): UTC-4 (EDT)
- ZIP code(s): 49713 (Boyne Falls); 49770 (Petoskey)
- Area code: 231
- FIPS code: 26-75900
- GNIS feature ID: 1627113
- Website: https://www.springvaletownship.org/

Springvale Township is a civil township of Emmet County in the U.S. state of Michigan. The population was 2,146 at the 2020 census.

== Geography ==
According to the United States Census Bureau, the township has a total area of 47.06 square miles (121.9 km^{2}), of which 44.71 square miles (115.8 km^{2}) is land and 2.35 square miles (6.1 km^{2}) (4.99%) is water.

Portions of Crooked Lake and Pickerel Lake, two lakes in the Inland Waterway connecting to Lake Huron, lie within Springvale Township. These lakes, as well as Berry Creek, which flows into Pickerel Lake, form the northern boundary of the township.

Springvale Township forms the southeastern corner of Emmet County, bordering Cheboygan County to the east, and Charlevoix County to the south. The western border of Springvale Township lies just over 5 miles (8.0 km) from downtown Petoskey.

Springvale Township contains no state-maintained highways, although US Highway 31 comes within less than a mile from the northwestern corner of the township. C-58 is a county-designated highway that runs west–east across the north of the township. C-58 links US 31 at Petoskey to I-75 at Wolverine.

== Communities ==
- Epsilon (45°21′46″N 84°48′7″W) is an unincorporated community within the township. Epsilon was founded in 1882, with a post office in operation from then until 1914.

== Demographics ==
As of the census of 2000, there were 1,727 people, 613 households, and 487 families residing in the township. The population density was 38.6 inhabitants per square mile (14.9/km^{2}). There were 815 housing units at an average density of 18.2 per square mile (7.0/km^{2}). The racial makeup of the township was 96.24% White, 0.06% African American, 2.43% Native American, 0.06% Asian, 0.06% Pacific Islander, 0.12% from other races, and 1.04% from two or more races. Hispanic or Latino of any race were 0.98% of the population.

There were 613 households, out of which 38.7% had children under the age of 18 living with them, 68.2% were married couples living together, 8.5% had a female householder with no husband present, and 20.4% were non-families. 16.5% of all households were made up of individuals, and 3.9% had someone living alone who was 65 years of age or older. The average household size was 2.81 and the average family size was 3.14.

In the township the population was spread out, with 28.1% under the age of 18, 6.5% from 18 to 24, 30.3% from 25 to 44, 25.3% from 45 to 64, and 9.8% who were 65 years of age or older. The median age was 37 years. For every 100 females, there were 102.2 males. For every 100 females age 18 and over, there were 105.0 males.

The median income for a household in the township was $44,148, and the median income for a family was $48,214. Males had a median income of $32,000 versus $23,393 for females. The per capita income for the township was $19,640. About 5.5% of families and 8.2% of the population were below the poverty line, including 8.4% of those under age 18 and 12.7% of those age 65 or over.
