= Oden, Michigan =

- Census-designated place (CDP) & unincorporated community
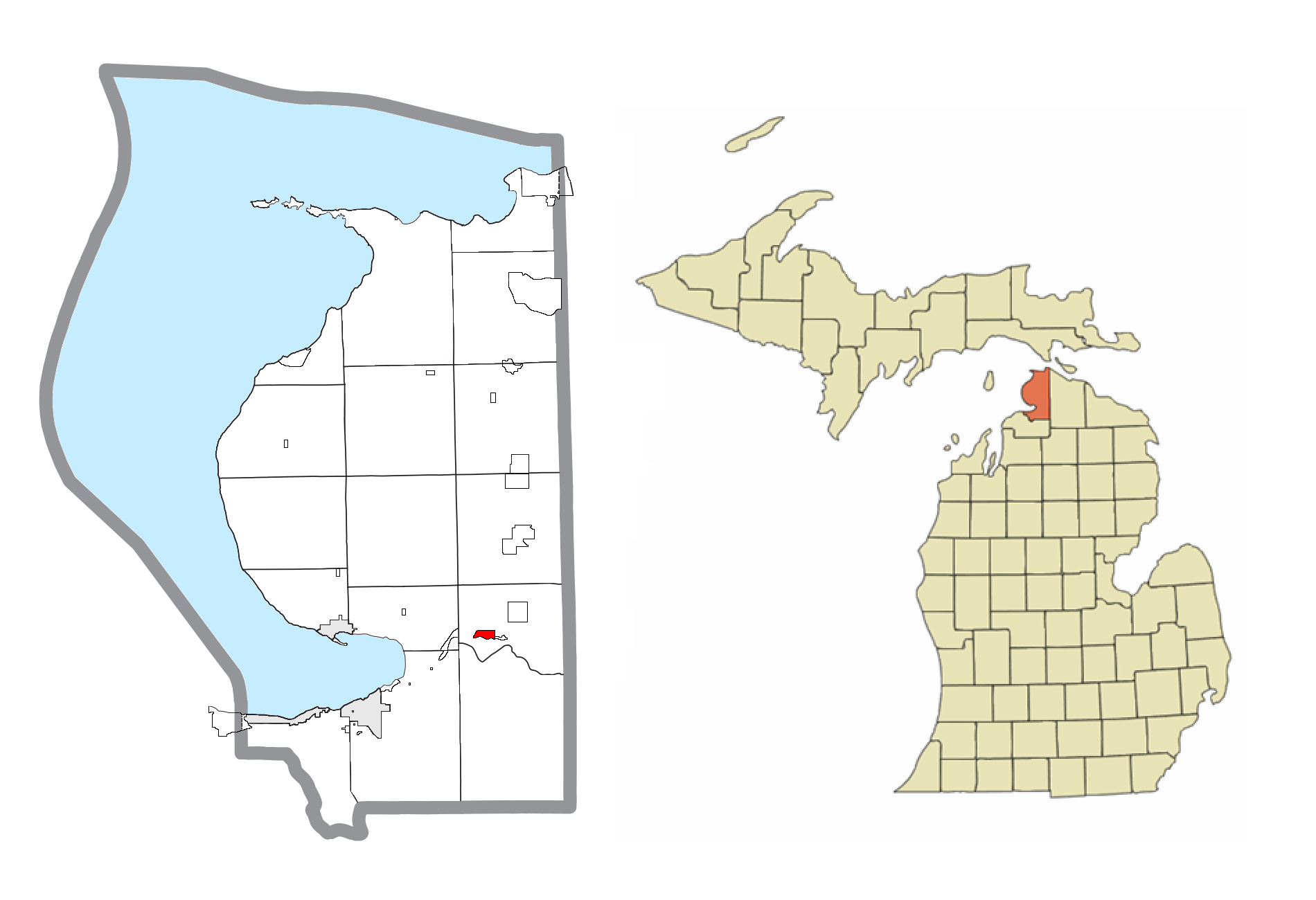
- Location within Emmet County

- Location within the state of Michigan Oden (the United States)
- Coordinates: 45°25′22″N 84°49′41″W
- Country: United States
- State: Michigan
- County: Emmet
- Township: Littlefield

Area
  - Total: 0.61 sq mi (1.59 km^{2})
  - Land: 0.61 sq mi (1.59 km^{2})
  - Water: 0 sq mi (0.00 km^{2})
- Elevation: 614 ft (187 m)

Population (2020)
  - Total: 358
  - Density: 583.4/sq mi (225.26/km^{2})
- Time zone: UTC-5 (Eastern (EST))
  - Summer (DST): UTC-4 (EDT)
- ZIP code(s): 49764
- Area code: 231
- FIPS code: 26-60180
- GNIS feature ID: 633940

Oden is an unincorporated community and census-designated place (CDP) in Emmet County in the U.S. state of Michigan. As of the 2020 census, Oden had a population of 358. It is located within Littlefield Township.

== Geography ==
Oden is located in southeastern Emmet County, in Littlefield Township, on the north shore of Crooked Lake. U.S. Route 31 passes through the community, leading southwest 8 miles (13 km) to Petoskey, the county seat, and northeast 3 miles (5 km) to Alanson.

The community of Oden was listed as a newly-organized census-designated place for the 2010 census, meaning it now has officially defined boundaries and population statistics for the first time.

According to the U.S. Census Bureau, the Oden CDP has a total area of 0.62 square miles (1.6 km^{2}), all of it land.

== Education ==
In much of the CDP, the school district is Alanson Public Schools. In western parts, the district is Public Schools of Petoskey.

== Demographics ==
Historical population
Census	Pop.	Note	%±
2020	358		—
U.S. Decennial Census
