= Readmond Township, Michigan =

- Civil township
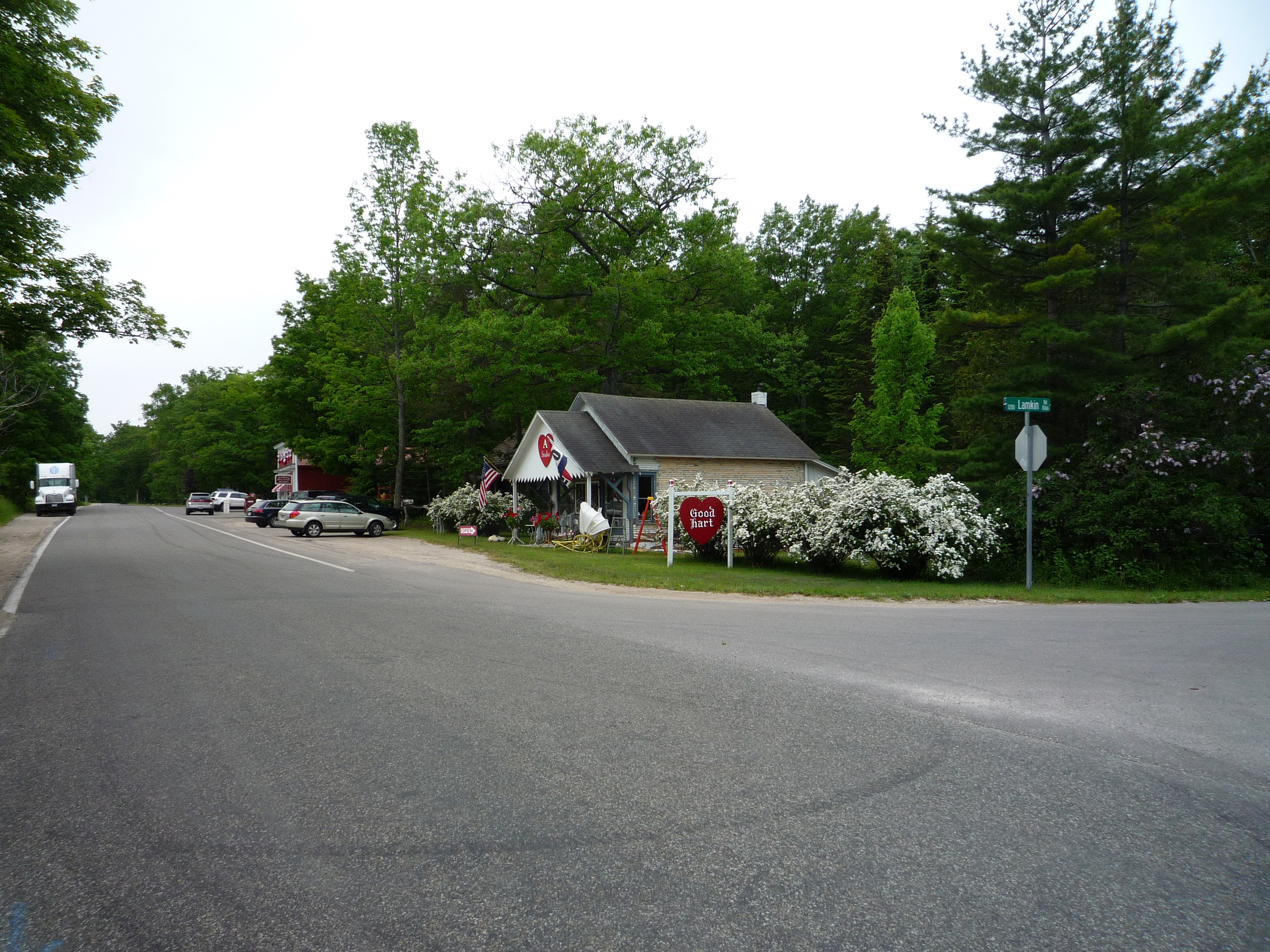
- Unincorporated community of Good Hart

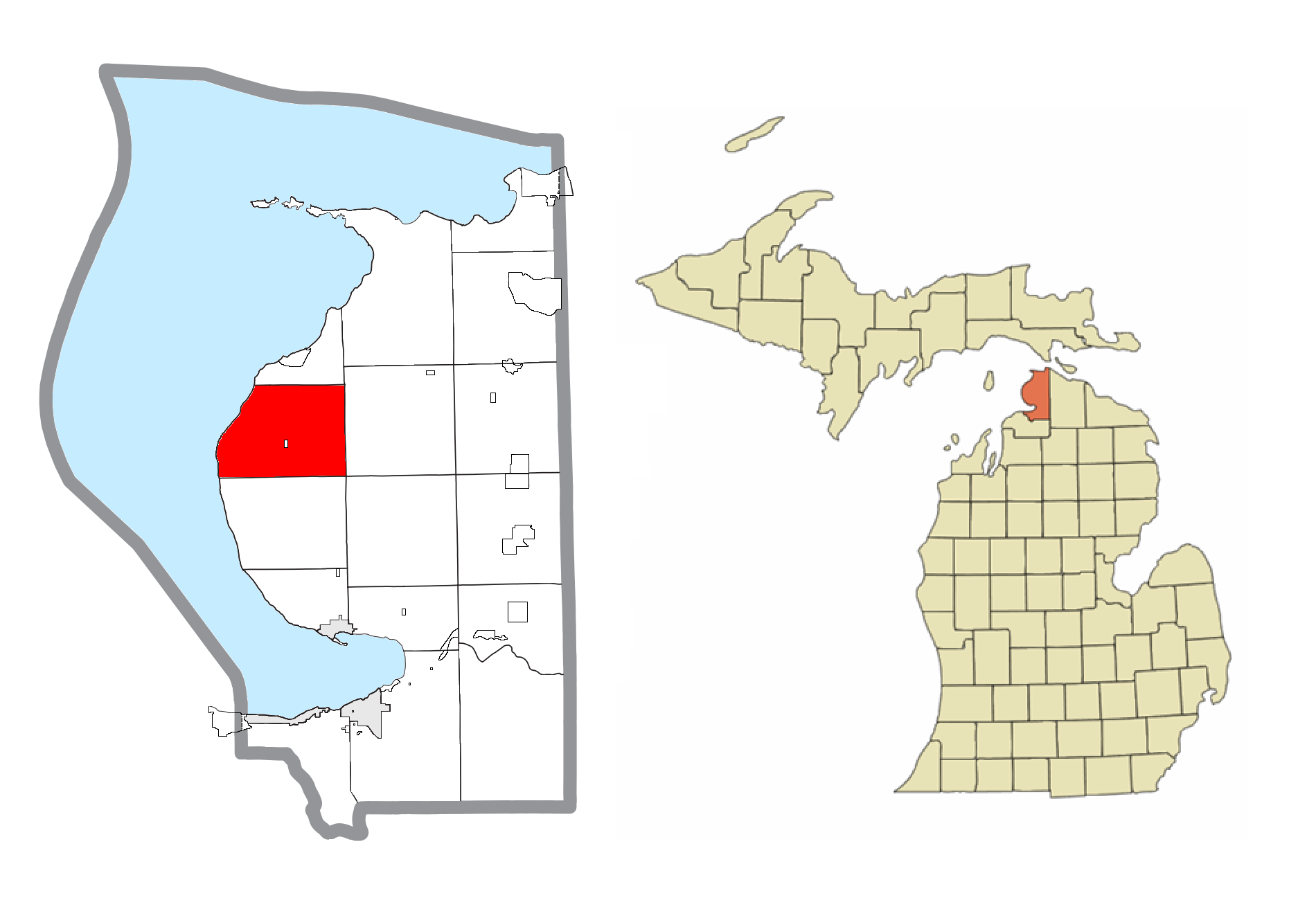
- Location within Emmet County

- Location within the state of Michigan Readmond Township (the United States)
- Coordinates: 45°34′34″N 85°02′09″W
- Country: United States
- State: Michigan
- County: Emmet
- Established: 1877

Government
  - Supervisor: Lisa Fineout
  - Clerk: Sarah Krupa

Area
  - Total: 31.03 sq mi (80.4 km^{2})
  - Land: 31.03 sq mi (80.4 km^{2})
  - Water: 0.0 sq mi (0 km^{2})
- Elevation: 869 ft (265 m)

Population (2020)
  - Total: 560
  - Density: 18/sq mi (7.0/km^{2})
- Time zone: UTC-5 (Eastern (EST))
  - Summer (DST): UTC-4 (EDT)
- ZIP Code(s): 49737 (Good Hart); 49740 (Harbor Springs); 49769 (Pellston)
- Area code: 231
- FIPS code: 26-67540
- GNIS feature ID: 1626958
- Website: https://readmondtownship.org/

Readmond Township is a civil township of Emmet County in the U.S. state of Michigan. The population was 560 at the 2020 census.

== Communities ==
Good Hart is an unincorporated community in the township on the shore of Lake Michigan at 45°34′02″N 85°06′48″W. It is on M-119 about 13 miles (21 km) north of Harbor Springs and eight miles (13 km) south of Cross Village. This was a center of Ojibwe settlement under the leadership of Joseph Black Hawk and his brother Good Heart in the early 19th-century.

== History ==
Indians knew the area as L'Arbre Croche, meaning crooked tree. In 1741, Jesuits established a mission to the Native Americans and it was known as Apatawaaing. By 1823, the Jesuits had built the first structure here and the area was known as Middle Village. St. Ignatius Church was destroyed by fire in 1889 then rebuilt.

== Geography ==
According to the United States Census Bureau, the township has a total area of 31.03 square miles (80.4 km^{2}), including all land.

== Demographics ==
As of the census of 2000, there were 493 people, 198 households, and 149 families residing in the township. The population density was 15.9 per square mile (6.1/km^{2}). There were 411 housing units at an average density of 13.3 per square mile (5.1/km^{2}). The racial makeup of the township was 93.10% White, 0.20% African American, 1.83% Native American, 0.20% Asian, 0.20% from other races, and 4.46% from two or more races. Hispanic or Latino of any race were 2.84% of the population.

There were 198 households, out of which 28.3% had children under the age of 18 living with them, 67.2% were married couples living together, 5.1% had a female householder with no husband present, and 24.7% were non-families. 20.7% of all households were made up of individuals, and 3.5% had someone living alone who was 65 years of age or older. The average household size was 2.49 and the average family size was 2.85.

In the township the population was spread out, with 23.5% under the age of 18, 5.5% from 18 to 24, 26.4% from 25 to 44, 30.6% from 45 to 64, and 14.0% who were 65 years of age or older. The median age was 42 years. For every 100 females, there were 94.9 males. For every 100 females age 18 and over, there were 95.3 males.

The median income for a household in the township was $40,114, and the median income for a family was $43,750. Males had a median income of $26,071 versus $22,031 for females. The per capita income for the township was $20,270. About 3.5% of families and 6.4% of the population lived below the poverty line, including 5.2% of those under age 18 and 9.2% of those age 65 or over.
