= West Traverse Township, Michigan =

- Civil township
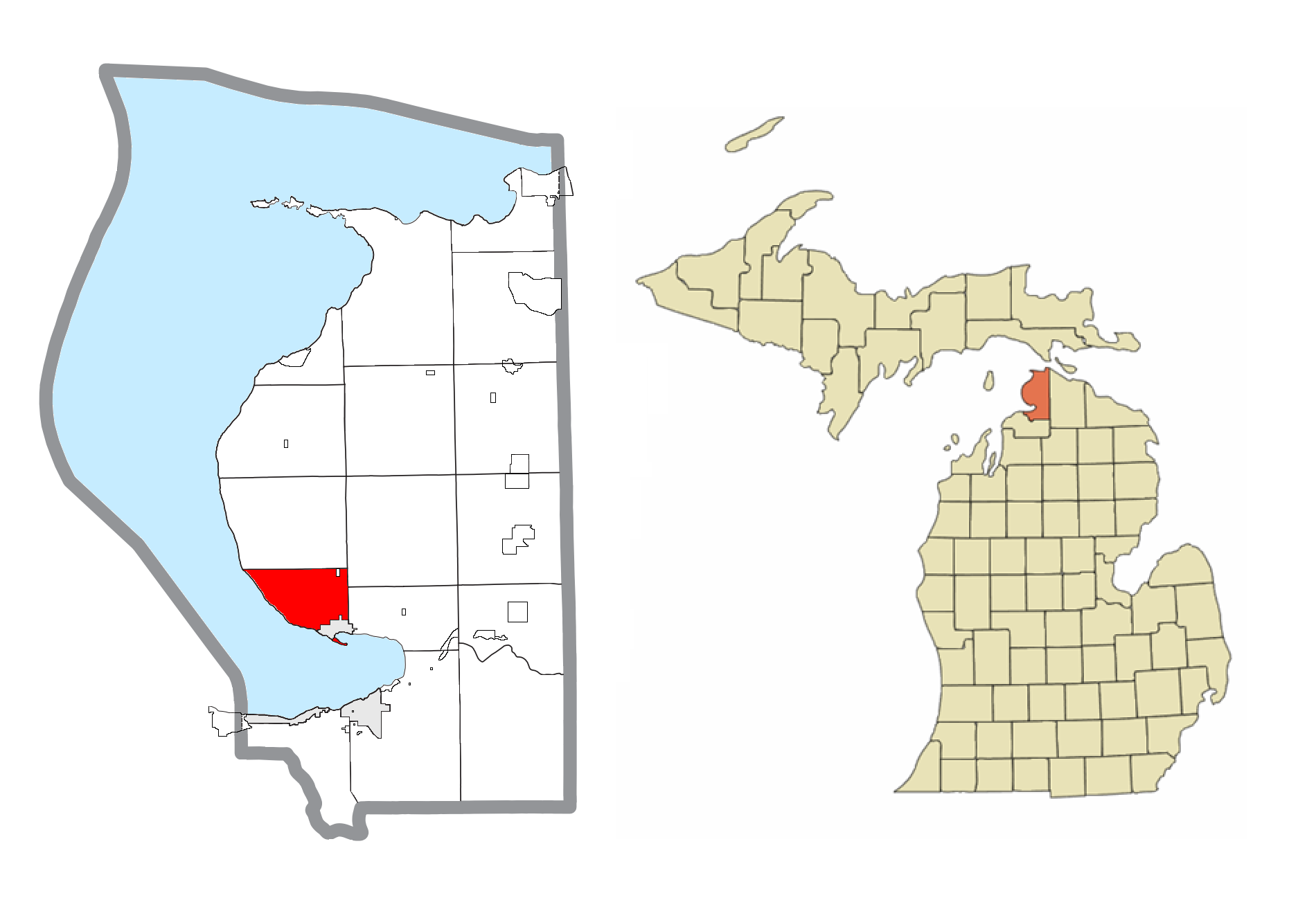
- Location within Emmet County

- Location within the state of Michigan West Traverse Township (the United States)
- Coordinates: 45°27′29″N 85°01′20″W
- Country: United States
- State: Michigan
- County: Emmet
- Established: 1897

Government
  - Supervisor: Ed Murphy
  - Clerk: Joseph (Jay) Olson

Area
  - Total: 13.39 sq mi (34.7 km^{2})
  - Land: 13.37 sq mi (34.6 km^{2})
  - Water: 0.02 sq mi (0.052 km^{2})
- Elevation: 945 ft (288 m)

Population (2020)
  - Total: 1,768
  - Density: 132.2/sq mi (51.06/km^{2})
- Time zone: UTC-5 (Eastern (EST))
  - Summer (DST): UTC-4 (EDT)
- ZIP code(s): 49740 (Harbor Springs)
- Area code: 231
- FIPS code: 26-86300
- GNIS feature ID: 1627252
- Website: https://westtraversetownship.gov/

West Traverse Township is a civil township of Emmet County in the U.S. state of Michigan. The population was 1,768 at the 2020 census.

== Communities ==
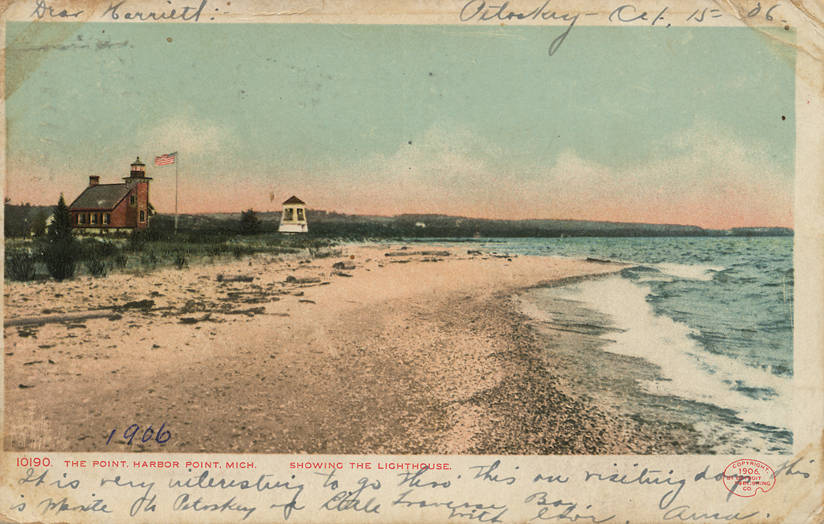
Harbor Point, circa 1900s

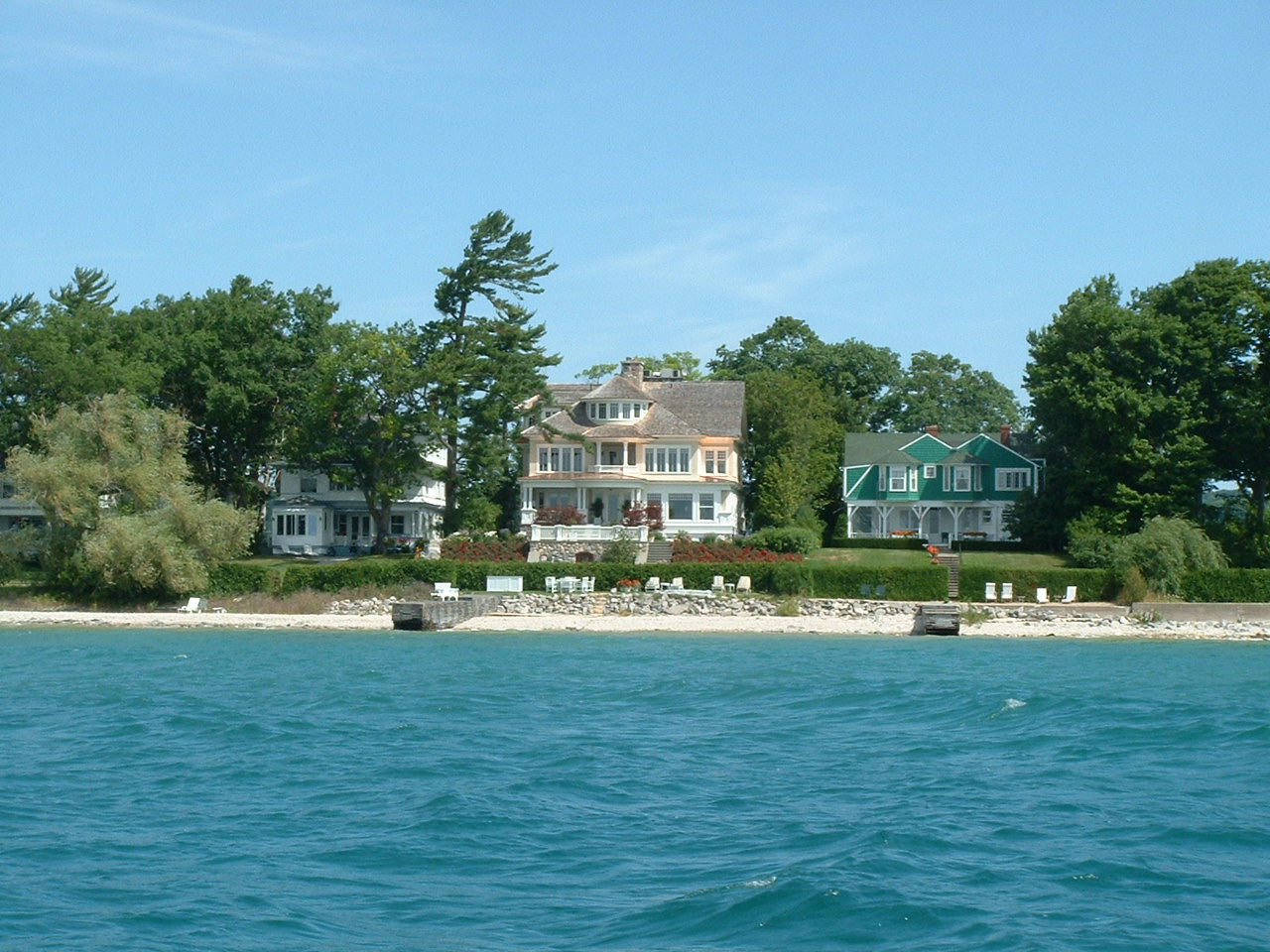
A few of the historic homes on the Harbor Point peninsula

- Harbor Point is an unincorporated community in a noncontiguous part of the township on a peninsula south of Harbor Springs at 45°25′31″N 84°59′13″W. The historic Little Traverse Lighthouse is located at the tip of the Harbor Point peninsula. It was begun as a resort originally called Lansing Resort in 1878.

== Geography ==
According to the United States Census Bureau, the township has a total area of 13.39 square miles (34.7 km^{2}), of which 13.37 square miles (34.6 km^{2}) is land and 0.02 square miles (0.052 km^{2}) (0.15%) is water. The city of Harbor Springs is located south of the township.
