= Pleasantview Township, Michigan =

- Civil township
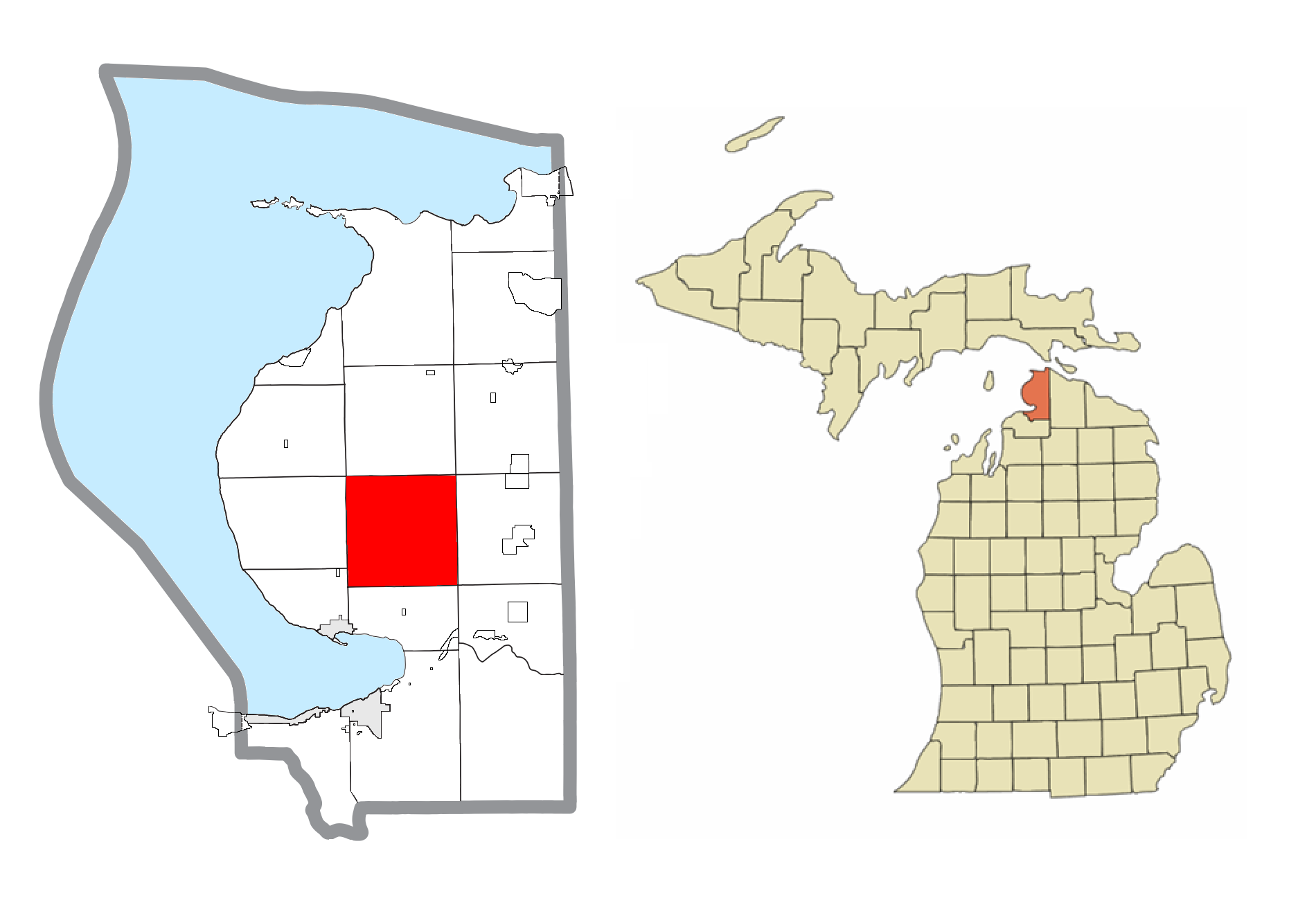
- Location within Emmet County

- Location within the state of Michigan Pleasantview Township (the United States)
- Coordinates: 45°30′02″N 84°55′29″W
- Country: United States
- State: Michigan
- County: Emmet
- Established: 1876

Government
  - Supervisor: Rocky Beydoun
  - Clerk: Debra Bosma

Area
  - Total: 35.69 sq mi (92.4 km^{2})
  - Land: 35.60 sq mi (92.2 km^{2})
  - Water: 0.09 sq mi (0.23 km^{2})
- Elevation: 745 ft (227 m)

Population (2020)
  - Total: 918
  - Density: 25.8/sq mi (9.96/km^{2})
- Time zone: UTC-5 (Eastern (EST))
  - Summer (DST): UTC-4 (EDT)
- ZIP code(s): 49706 (Alanson); 49740 (Harbor Springs); 49769 (Pellston)
- Area code: 231
- FIPS code: 26-64960
- GNIS feature ID: 1626918
- Website: https://pleasantviewmi.gov/

Pleasantview Township is a civil township of Emmet County in the U.S. state of Michigan. The population was 918 at the 2020 census.

== Geography ==
According to the United States Census Bureau, the township has a total area of 35.69 square miles (92.4 km^{2}), of which 35.60 square miles (92.2 km^{2}) is land and 0.09 square miles (0.23 km^{2}) (0.03%) is water.

== Demographics ==
As of the census of 2000, there were 943 people, 313 households, and 224 families residing in the township. The population density was 26.4 inhabitants per square mile (10.2/km^{2}). There were 754 housing units at an average density of 21.1 per square mile (8.2/km^{2}). The racial makeup of the township was 87.91% White, 7.42% African American, 1.80% Native American, 0.42% Asian, 0.42% from other races, and 2.01% from two or more races. Hispanic or Latino of any race were 0.74% of the population.

There were 313 households, out of which 35.8% had children under the age of 18 living with them, 62.3% were married couples living together, 6.7% had a female householder with no husband present, and 28.4% were non-families. 22.4% of all households were made up of individuals, and 4.5% had someone living alone who was 65 years of age or older. The average household size was 2.58 and the average family size was 3.04.

In the township the population was spread out, with 23.9% under the age of 18, 7.3% from 18 to 24, 39.8% from 25 to 44, 18.8% from 45 to 64, and 10.3% who were 65 years of age or older. The median age was 35 years. For every 100 females, there were 139.3 males. For every 100 females age 18 and over, there were 150.2 males.

The median income for a household in the township was $42,333, and the median income for a family was $45,833. Males had a median income of $34,750 versus $26,250 for females. The per capita income for the township was $20,332. About 2.0% of families and 4.5% of the population were below the poverty line, including 2.8% of those under age 18 and 2.6% of those age 65 or over.

Visit Pleasantview Township, Michigan website for more information.
