= Friendship Township, Michigan =

- Civil township
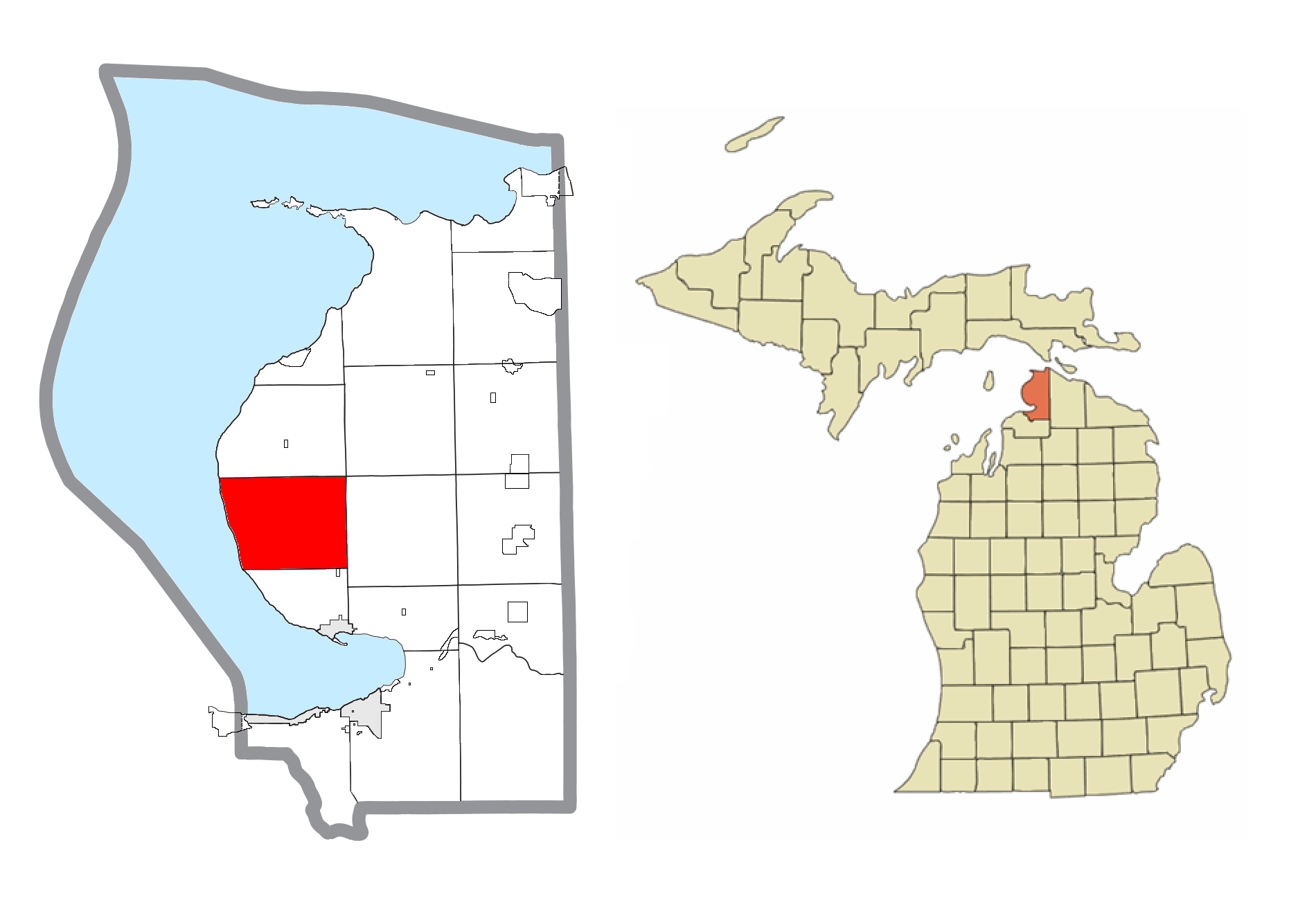
- Location within Emmet County

- Location within the state of Michigan Friendship Township (the United States)
- Coordinates: 45°30′54″N 85°02′55″W
- Country: United States
- State: Michigan
- County: Emmet
- Established: 1877

Government
  - Supervisor: Frederick Troup
  - Clerk: Janell Van Divner

Area
  - Total: 31.45 sq mi (81.5 km^{2})
  - Land: 31.45 sq mi (81.5 km^{2})
  - Water: 0.0 sq mi (0 km^{2})
- Elevation: 968 ft (295 m)

Population (2020)
  - Total: 954
  - Density: 30.3/sq mi (11.7/km^{2})
- Time zone: UTC-5 (Eastern (EST))
  - Summer (DST): UTC-4 (EDT)
- ZIP code(s): 49740 (Harbor Springs)
- Area code: 231
- FIPS code: 26-30860
- GNIS feature ID: 1626322
- Website: https://www.friendshiptownship.org/

Friendship Township is a civil township of Emmet County in the U.S. state of Michigan. The population was 954 at the 2020 census.

== History ==
A settlement named Appleton was established at the mouth of Spring Creek along Lake Michigan. It had a post office from 1884 until 1889.

== Geography ==
According to the United States Census Bureau, the township has a total area of 31.45 square miles (81.5 km^{2}), all land.

== Demographics ==
As of the census of 2000, there were 844 people, 333 households, and 240 families residing in the township. The population density was 26.9 inhabitants per square mile (10.4/km^{2}). There were 457 housing units at an average density of 14.6 per square mile (5.6/km^{2}). The racial makeup of the township was 94.67% White, 0.24% African American, 3.08% Native American, 0.24% Asian, 0.12% Pacific Islander, and 1.66% from two or more races. Hispanic or Latino of any race were 0.36% of the population.

There were 333 households, out of which 30.6% had children under the age of 18 living with them, 64.0% were married couples living together, 3.9% had a female householder with no husband present, and 27.9% were non-families. 24.3% of all households were made up of individuals, and 6.3% had someone living alone who was 65 years of age or older. The average household size was 2.53 and the average family size was 2.99.

In the township the population was spread out, with 26.1% under the age of 18, 5.0% from 18 to 24, 29.3% from 25 to 44, 29.9% from 45 to 64, and 9.8% who were 65 years of age or older. The median age was 38 years. For every 100 females, there were 113.1 males. For every 100 females age 18 and over, there were 107.3 males.

The median income for a household in the township was $46,000, and the median income for a family was $55,938. Males had a median income of $34,375 versus $20,938 for females. The per capita income for the township was $22,324. About 4.3% of families and 6.0% of the population were below the poverty line, including 6.2% of those under age 18 and 6.7% of those age 65 or over.
