= Bear Creek Township, Michigan =

- Civil township
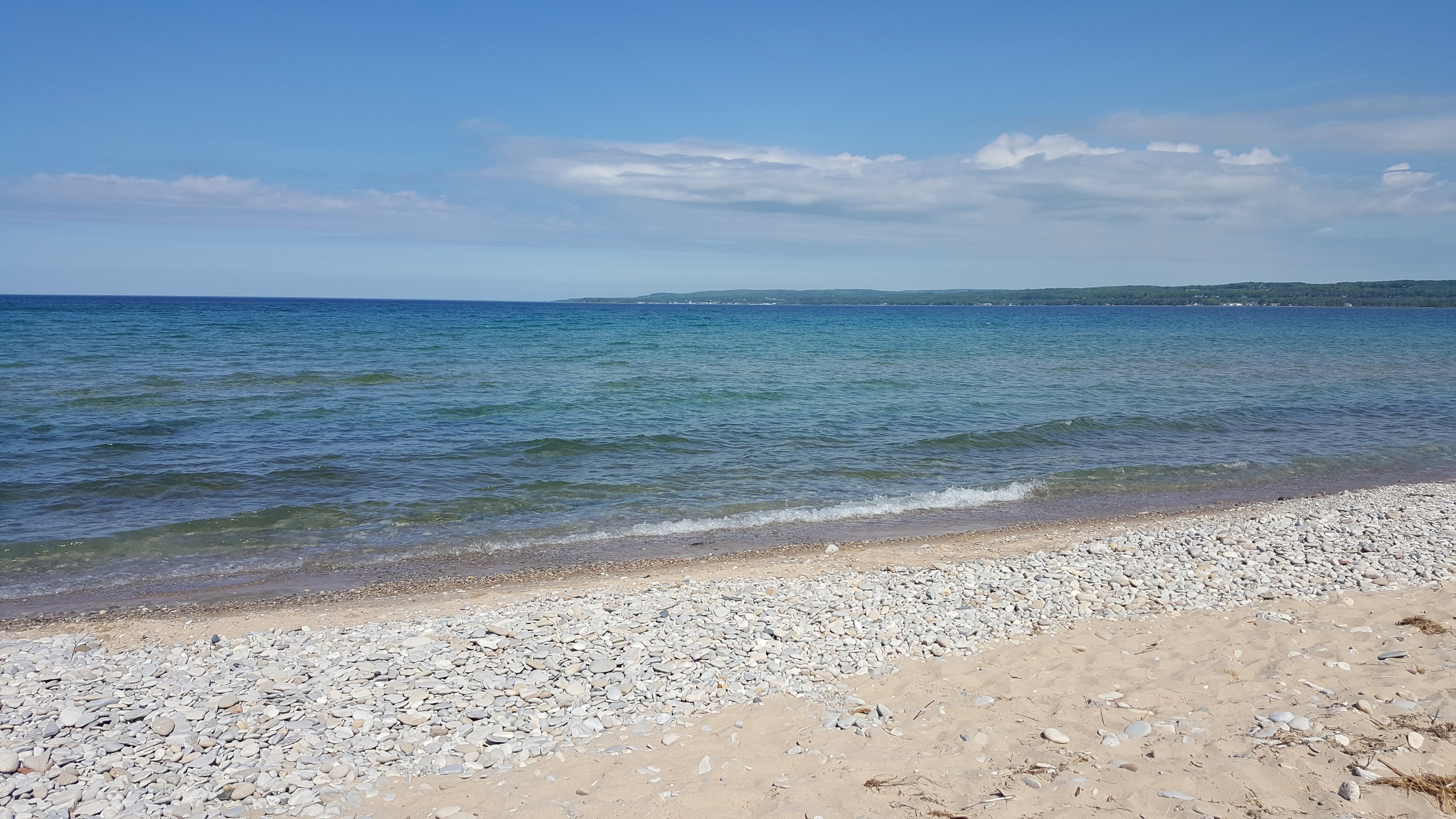
- The shore of Little Traverse Bay at Petoskey State Park

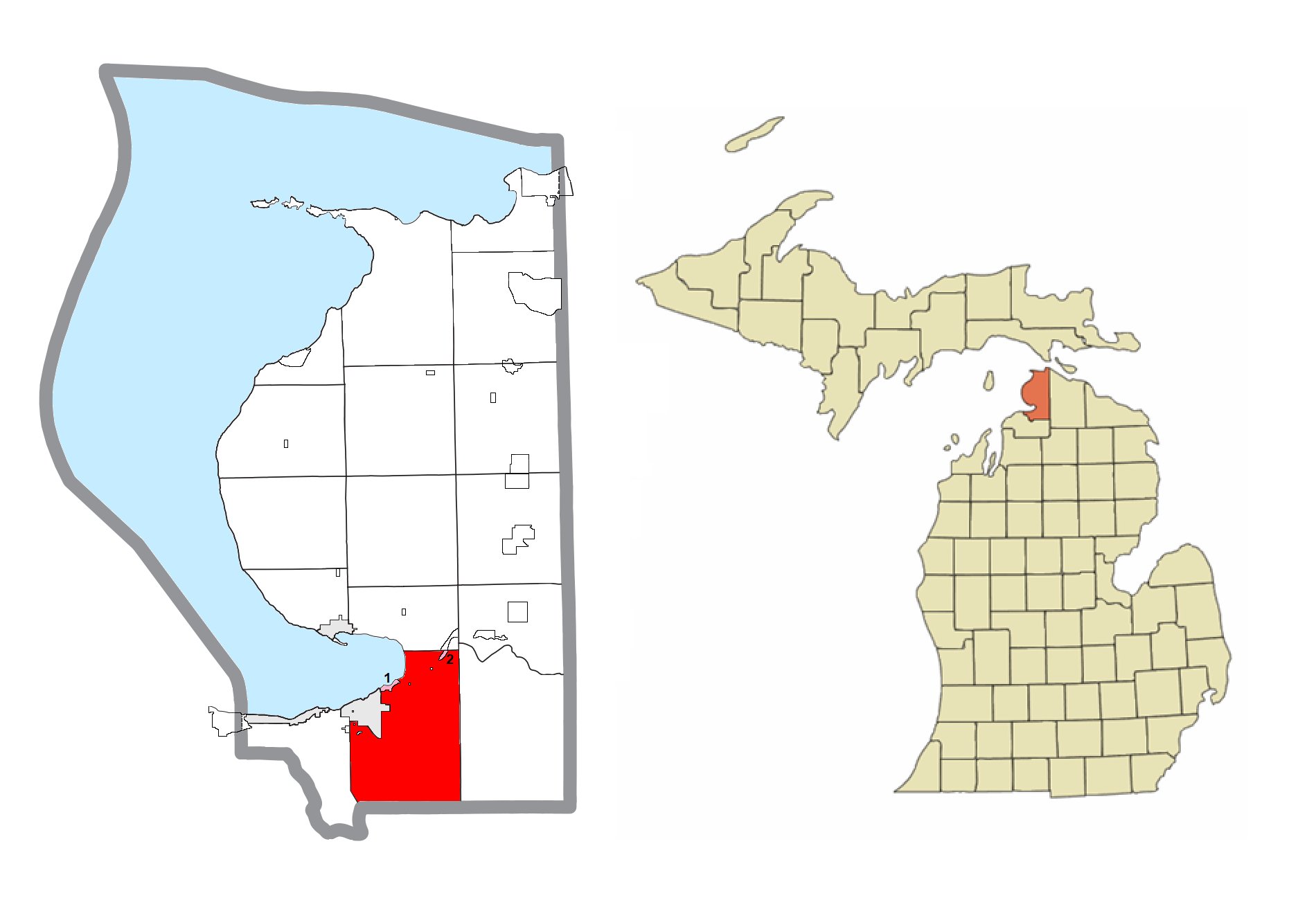
- Location within Emmet County and the administered communities of Bay View (1) and portion of Conway (2)

- Location within the state of Michigan Bear Creek Township (the United States)
- Coordinates: 45°22′19″N 84°55′26″W
- Country: United States
- State: Michigan
- County: Emmet
- Established: 1897

Government
  - Supervisor: Dennis Keiser
  - Clerk: Emma Kendziorski

Area
  - Total: 45.69 sq mi (118.3 km^{2})
  - Land: 39.57 sq mi (102.5 km^{2})
  - Water: 6.12 sq mi (15.9 km^{2})
- Elevation: 830 ft (253 m)

Population (2020)
  - Total: 6,542
  - Density: 156.7/sq mi (60.5/km^{2})
- Time zone: UTC-5 (Eastern (EST))
  - Summer (DST): UTC-4 (EDT)
- ZIP code(s): 49713 (Boyne Falls); 49722 (Conway); 49740 (Harbor Springs); 49770 (Petoskey)
- Area code: 231
- FIPS code: 26-06380
- GNIS feature ID: 1625895
- Website: Official website

Bear Creek Township is a civil township of Emmet County in the U.S. state of Michigan. As of the 2020 census, the township population was 6,542, making it the most populous municipality in Emmet County.

== Communities ==
- Bay View is an unincorporated community and census-designated place located just east of the city of Petoskey along the shores of Little Traverse Bay. The community's population was 133 at the 2010 census. Bay View uses the 49770 ZIP Code.
- Conway is an unincorporated community and census-designated place in the northern portion of the township. The majority of the community is located within Little Traverse Township. Of the community's 0.42 square miles (1.1 km^{2}) of land area and population of 204, only 0.11 square miles (0.28 km^{2}) of land and six residents reside within Bear Creak Township's portion of Conway. Conway has its own post office with the 49722 ZIP Code.
- The Little Traverse Bay Bands of Odawa Indians occupies four scattered reservations within Bear Creak Township.
- The city of Petoskey is immediately adjacent to Bear Creek Township.

== Geography ==
According to the United States Census Bureau, the township has a total area of 45.69 square miles (118.3 km^{2}), of which 39.57 square miles (102.5 km^{2}) is land and 6.12 square miles (15.9 km^{2}) (13.48%) is water. The city of Petoskey is northeast of the township, and the township has a coastline along Little Traverse Bay with which Petoskey State Park is located.

=== Major highways ===
- US 31 runs southwest–northeast in the township, exiting to the north toward Mackinaw City
- US 131 runs north–south through the southwest of the township, exiting south into Charlevoix County
- M-119 runs north–south through the north of the township, paralleling Little Traverse Bay and exiting north toward Harbor Springs. The southern terminus of M-119 is located within Bear Creek Township, at a junction with US 31.

== Demographics ==
As of the census of 2000, there were 5,269 people, 2,001 households, and 1,416 families residing in the township. The population density was 133.0 inhabitants per square mile (51.4/km^{2}). There were 2,969 housing units at an average density of 75.0 per square mile (29.0/km^{2}). The racial makeup of the township was 96.32% White, 0.09% African American, 1.73% Native American, 0.59% Asian, 0.02% Pacific Islander, 0.23% from other races, and 1.02% from two or more races. Hispanic or Latino of any race were 1.02% of the population.

There were 2,001 households, out of which 36.1% had children under the age of 18 living with them, 58.9% were married couples living together, 8.7% had a female householder with no husband present, and 29.2% were non-families. 23.8% of all households were made up of individuals, and 11.6% had someone living alone who was 65 years of age or older. The average household size was 2.57 and the average family size was 3.07.

In the township the population was spread out, with 27.5% under the age of 18, 7.0% from 18 to 24, 27.1% from 25 to 44, 24.1% from 45 to 64, and 14.3% who were 65 years of age or older. The median age was 38 years. For every 100 females, there were 94.6 males. For every 100 females age 18 and over, there were 91.9 males.

The median income for a household in the township was $44,129, and the median income for a family was $52,262. Males had a median income of $36,483 versus $27,206 for females. The per capita income for the township was $22,534. About 3.1% of families and 5.0% of the population were below the poverty line, including 6.2% of those under age 18 and 8.1% of those age 65 or over.
