= C-66 (Michigan county highway) =

County road in Michigan

C-66
- Levering Road; Cheboygan Road
- C-66 highlighted in red

Route information
- Maintained by ECRC and CCRC
- Length: 28.047 mi (45.137 km)
- Existed: c. October 5, 1970–present

Major junctions
- West end: M-119 in Cross Village
- C-81 in Bliss Township; US 31 in Levering; I-75 near Cheboygan
- East end: US 23 in Cheboygan

Location
- Country: United States
- State: Michigan
- Counties: Emmet, Cheboygan

Highway system
- County-Designated Highways
← C-65	→ C-71

C-66 is a county-designated highway in the US state of Michigan running about 28 miles (45 km) across the northern tip of the Lower Peninsula. The roadway starts in the unincorporated community of Cross Village in Emmet County at an intersection with M-119 and C-77. It follows Levering Road through rural areas to an interchange with Interstate 75 (I-75) west of Cheboygan. The eastern terminus is at an intersection with US Highway 23 (US 23) and M-27 in downtown Cheboygan. The first roadways along what is now C-66 were in place by the early 20th century. Segments were paved by 1936, although some reverted to a gravel surface during World War II. The full roadway was paved by the mid-1950s, and the C-66 moniker was designated on the roadway in the early 1970s.

== Route description ==
The roadway starts at a junction with M-119 (Lake Shore Drive) and C-77 (State Road) in the community of Cross Village near Lake Michigan in Emmet County. C-66 travels southward for about 300 feet (91 m) concurrently along C-77 to the intersection with Levering Road. From there, C-66 turns eastward on Levering Road, leaving town. The landscape outside of town is mostly woodland with scattered fields. Except for a jog near Hill Road in Bliss Township, Levering Road is a straight road running due east. C-66 intersects C-81 (Pleasantview Road) in a clearing before entering the community of Levering. The county road passes through some residential areas and by a baseball field before meeting US 31. C-66 turns south to run concurrently along US 31 for about a quarter mile (0.4 km) before turning eastward again.

Levering Road continues easterly leaving town south of Sherett Lake. East of the intersection with Ingleside Road, C-66 crosses into Cheboygan County. The roadway curves to the northeast before returning to a due eastward course north of Munro Lake along the Hebron–Munro township line.. The landscape changes to include more farm fields once road passes the lake. C-66 intersects I-75 at exit 326 along the latter. On the east side of the interchange, Levering Road passes Sea Shell City, a tourist trap, and turns northeastward into Hebron Township. C-66 then turns easterly again before it crosses into Beaugrand Township, taking the additional name Cheboygan Road. The roadway crosses branches of the Little Black River and passes to the south of the Cheboygan County Airport. East of the airport, C-66 enters the city of Cheboygan and follows State Street into town; this area is residential in nature. State Street crosses the North Central State Trail, a rail trail, before turning to the southeast. The roadway passes into the northern end of downtown near several smaller businesses.. C-66 terminates at a four-way intersection with Main Street one block west of the Cheboygan River; this intersection also marks the northern terminus of M-27. As a county-designated highway, C-66 is maintained by the Emmet and Cheboygan county road commissions (ECRC, CCRC) in their respective counties.

== History ==
Roadways along the route of Levering Road in Cheboygan County existed as far back as 1902 in Hebron and Munro townships; the section south of the township line was not yet built at the time. By 1927, Levering Road extended across the tip of the Lower Peninsula; near the Hebron–Beaugrand township line in Cheboygan County, the county road made a jog to follow what is now Wollangur and Hill roads. In 1930, the ECRC paved Levering Road between US 31 and the county line and the CCRC paved the roadway in Beaugrand Township. By mid 1936, it was paved from a point between Cross Village and the Pleasantview Road intersection to the county line in Emmet County as well as the Beaugrand Township section in Cheboygan County. During World War II, the counties reverted most of Levering Road to a gravel surface; pavement in Emmet County started east of Pleasantview Road instead of west, and Cheboygan County had no sections paved. At the same time, the new roadway was opened to bypass Wollangur and Hill roads.

In late 1949 or early 1950, the ECRC repaved Levering Road westward back to the point between Cross Village and Pleasantview Road that had been paved before the war. In late 1951 or early 1952, the CCRC paved its section of Levering Road. In late 1954 or early 1955, the ECRC completed paving all of Levering Road in its jurisdiction. The county-designated highway system was created around after October 5, 1970. The C-66 designation was first shown on the 1971 state map following the routing used today.

== Major intersections ==
County	Location	mi	km	Destinations	Notes
Emmet	Cross Village	0.000	0.000	M-119 south (Lake Shore Drive) C-77 south (State Road)	Common terminus of C-66 and C-77
Emmet	Cross Village	0.058	0.093	C-77 south (State Road) – Harbor Springs	Southern end of C-77 concurrency
Emmet	Bliss Township	8.128	13.081	C-81 (Pleasantview Road) – Petoskey, Mackinaw City	
Emmet	Levering	12.548	20.194	US 31 north (Mackinac Highway) / LMCT – Mackinaw City	Northern end of US 31 concurrency
Emmet	Levering	12.798	20.596	US 31 south (Mackinac Highway) / LMCT – Petoskey	Southern end of US 31 concurrency
Cheboygan	Hebron–Munro township line	20.035– 20.053	32.243– 32.272	I-75 (G. Mennen Williams Freeway) – Saginaw, Mackinac Bridge	Exit 326 on I-75
Cheboygan	Cheboygan	28.047	45.137	US 23 (Main Street, State Street) / LHCT – Rogers City, Mackinaw City M-27 south (Main Street) – Indian River	Eastern terminus of C-66; State Street continues eastward as part of US 23; Main Street is US 23 north and M-27 south of the intersection
1.000 mi = 1.609 km; 1.000 km = 0.621 mi: Concurrency terminus
