= Harbor Springs Municipal Airport =

- IATA: none; ICAO: KMGN; FAA LID: MGN

Summary
- Airport type: Public
- Owner: Harbor/Petoskey Area Airport Authority
- Location: Harbor Springs, Michigan
- Elevation AMSL: 686 ft (209 m)
- Coordinates: 45°25′32″N 084°54′48″W

Map
- Location of airport in Michigan MGN (the United States)

Runways
Direction	Length		Surface
Direction	ft	m	Surface
10/28	4,157	1,267	Asphalt

Statistics (2018)
- Aircraft operations: 16,742
- Based aircraft: 19
- Source: FAA and airport web site

Harbor Springs Municipal Airport (ICAO: KMGN, FAA LID: MGN), also known as Harbor Springs Airport, is a public airport located three miles (5 km) east of the central business district of Harbor Springs, a city in Emmet County, Michigan, United States. It is included in the Federal Aviation Administration (FAA) National Plan of Integrated Airport Systems for 2017–2021, in which it is categorized as a local general aviation facility.

Although most U.S. airports use the same three-letter location identifier for the FAA and IATA, Harbor Springs Municipal Airport is assigned MGN by the FAA but has no designation from the IATA (which assigned MGN to Baracoa Regional Airport in Magangué, Colombia). The airport's ICAO identifier is KMGN.

The airport has a skydiving facility recognized by the U.S. Parachute Association.

== Facilities and aircraft ==
Harbor Springs Municipal Airport covers an area of 95 acres (38 ha) which contains one asphalt runway (10/28): 4,149 x 75 ft (1,265 x 23 m).

The airport has a fixed-base operator that sells fuel and offers courtesy cars, a conference room, a crew lounge, snooze rooms, and more.

For 12-month period ending December 31, 2018 the airport had 16,742 aircraft operations, an average of 45 per day. It consists completely of general aviation. At the time there were 19 aircraft based at the field: 17 single-engine airplanes, 1 multi-engine airplane, and 1 jet.

The airport is staffed daily from 8 am until dusk. It is accessible by road from M-119.

== Accidents and incidents ==
- On January 9, 2005, a Cessna 414A crashed during an aborted takeoff from Harbor Springs. The aircraft impacted a snowbank and airport fence off the departure end of the runway. The pilot stated that when the airplane reached rotation speed during takeoff it "felt mushy" and he "immediately decided to abort the takeoff." Though the pilot reported airframe icing on approach into Harbor Springs, he subsequently stated there was no ice on the airframe during the preflight. However, FAA photos show ice accumulation on the leading edges of the wings and the horizontal stabilizer during investigation. The probable cause was found to be the pilot's inadequate preflight planning/preparation by his failure to remove the accumulated airframe ice which resulted in deteriorated aircraft takeoff performance.
- On January 12, 2007, a Cessna 425 impacted terrain while attempting to land in Harbor Springs. The aircraft was flying a GPS approach to the airport and maintained an additional 20 knots above final approach speed to compensate for gusting winds. The aircraft began to flare above the runway threshold, but after touchdown, the aircraft "abruptly pitched up and was pushed over to the left" and flight control inputs were "only marginally effective" in keeping the wings level, according to pilot reports. The aircraft drifted off the runway and began to shudder, and thought the pilot added power to go around, the aircraft cartwheeled and subsequently caught fire. The probable cause was found to be the pilot's failure to maintain aircraft control and adequate airspeed during landing flare.
- On August 9, 2015, a Piper PA-32 impacted trees and terrain while on approach to Harbor Springs Airport. It was the private pilot's first night time logged in years, as well as his first in the aircraft and his first into the airport. The probable cause was found to be the pilot's failure to maintain clearance from the trees during the approach in dark, night conditions, which resulted in controlled flight into trees and terrain.

== See also ==
- List of airports in Michigan
