= Payson Wolfe =

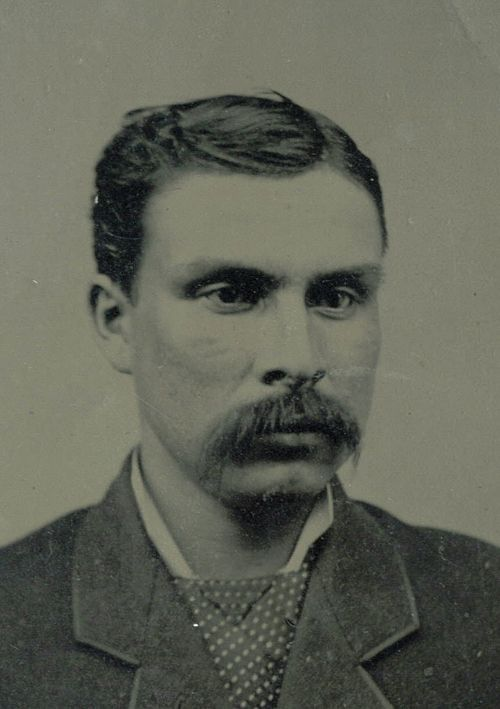
- Born: August 1833; Grand Manitou Island, Upper Canada
- Died: December 7, 1900 (Age 63); Cross Village Township, Michigan
- Spouse: Mary Jane Smith (1851-1879)

Payson Wolfe (August 1833–December 7, 1900) was an Odawa Indian who served in Company K of the 1st Regiment Michigan Volunteer Sharpshooters from August 8, 1863, to June 13, 1865, during which he was held as a prisoner of war at Andersonville. He was a citizen of the United States, and was noted for having been one of few Native Americans to vote Republican in the presidential election of 1856, as most voted Democrat out of fear of the government. He is regarded as the most documented Odawa Indian of his time, due to his relation as the son-in-law of Rev. George Smith, the personal diaries of whom currently reside in the Library of Congress.

== Personal life ==
Wolfe was born about 1833. His father was Nayan Miengun (Wolfe) and his mother, Charlotte Waukazoo, also known as Kin-ne-quay, was the daughter of a war chief and sister of both Peter and Joseph Waukazoo. Peter Waukzoo and Reverend George Nelson Smith founded the town of Waukazooville, renamed Northport, Michigan in 1854. Wolfe attended the village school in Northport, and was fluent in both the Odawa and English languages. He was married on July 29, 1851, to Mary Jane Smith, the 15-year-old daughter of Reverend George Smith. Smith performed the services for his daughters wedding, and kept an account of the event in his personal diary. Payson and Mary Jane lived on a farm in Northport overlooking Grand Traverse Bay and raised thirteen children, born between 1852 and 1874. The experience at Andersonville left Wolfe at merely 60 pounds, and with a permanent disability of his left arm caused by a bout of scurvy. Wolfe fell into bad habits as a result of lasting physical and psychological effects of the war, which greatly strained his relationship with Mary Jane. He moved from Northport to Cross Village in 1878, and divorced Mary Jane in 1879. Wolfe received a pension in September 1869 for the injuries he suffered at Andersonville. He died on December 7, 1900, and is buried at the Holy Cross Cemetery in Cross Village, Michigan.

== Military service ==
In March 1863, a state bounty act allowed for Native Americans to receive the same benefits as white men who enlisted to fight in the Civil War. A recruiting drive was led through the northern half of Michigan to assemble Native Americans to join a company of sharpshooters. Wolfe, already the father of six children, enlisted on August 3, 1863, in Northport and mustered in at Dearborn, Michigan on August 8, 1863. He was a member of Company K of the 1st Regiment Michigan Volunteer Sharpshooters, and fought with the regiment during Grant's Overland Campaign. Wolfe was a skilled shooter, and would often fill baskets with birds that he shot out of the sky to feed his family. With Company K, Wolfe fought at the Battle of the Wilderness, Battle of Spotsylvania Court House, Battle of Cold Harbor, and Petersburg. He was captured late on June 17, 1864, after his brigade was ordered to support a charge on Confederate earthworks near the Shand House during the Second Battle of Petersburg.

After he was captured, Wolfe spent 3 weeks at Libby Prison in Richmond before spending 5 months at the infamous Andersonville Prison in Georgia. Conditions at Andersonville were brutal; prisoners often went up to 4 days without food, and slept in the open, exposed to the elements, Wolfe being no exception. He told his father-in- law stories of how men had been forced to eat boiled rice with maggots, and that the food was so scarcely available that many had to eat the vomit of others who could not stomach it in order to survive. Wolfe was finally released in August 1864, as part of an offer made by the Confederacy to return sick and wounded Union prisoners. He was one of only 8 men out of the 15 from Company K to survive his time at Andersonville. Following his release, Wolfe spent time in Northport to recuperate, returned to service with the other surviving members of Company K on December 2, 1864. He was discharged from service as a paroled prisoner on June 13, 1865.
