= Cross Village Township, Michigan =

- Civil township
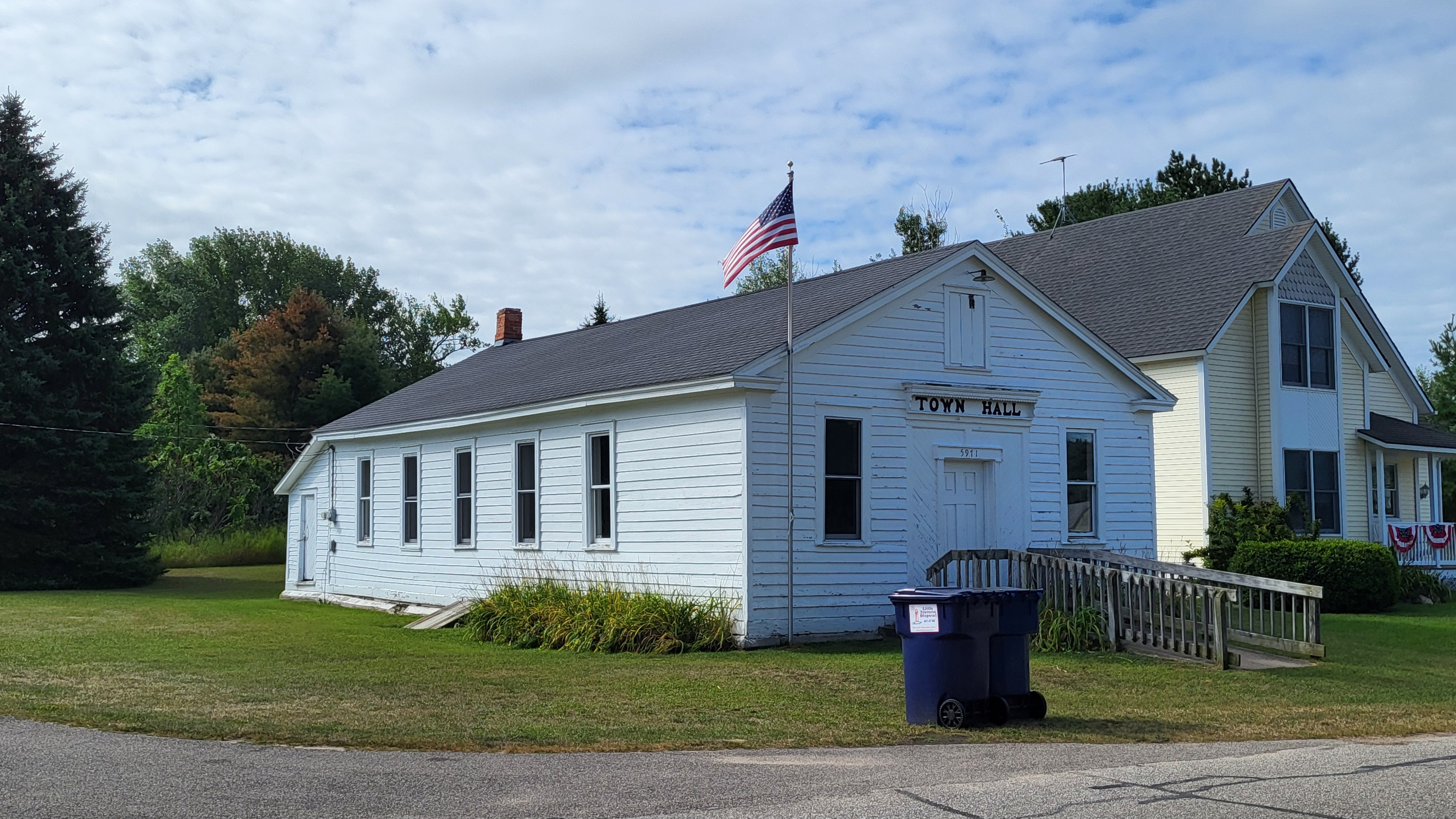
- Former Township Hall in Cross Village

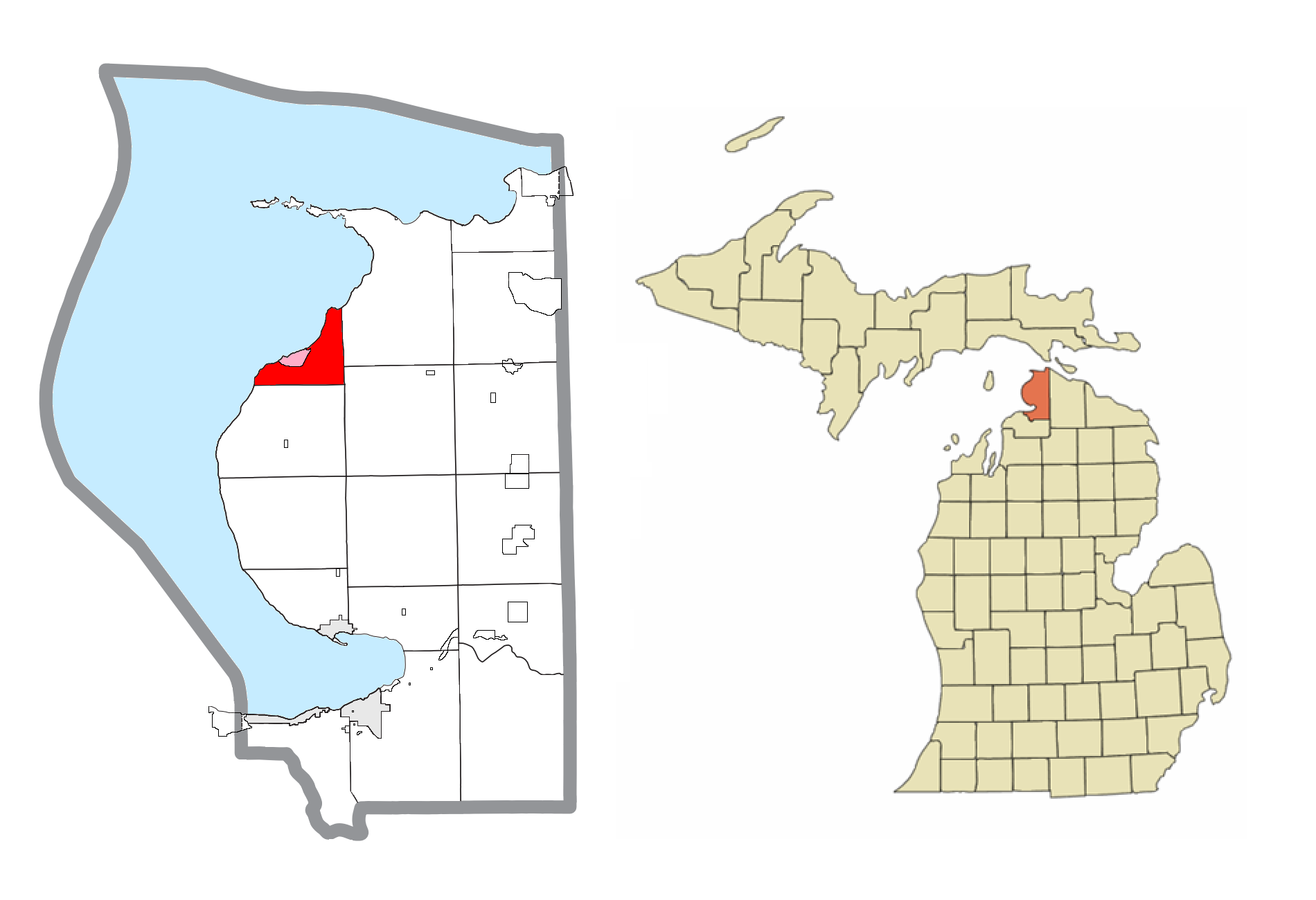
- Location within Emmet County (red) and the administered community of Cross Village (pink)

- Location within the state of Michigan Location within the United States
- Coordinates: 45°38′56″N 85°01′10″W
- Country: United States
- State: Michigan
- County: Emmet
- Established: 1855

Government
  - Supervisor: Gene Reck
  - Clerk: Priscilla Sweet

Area
  - Total: 10.33 sq mi (26.8 km^{2})
  - Land: 10.10 sq mi (26.2 km^{2})
  - Water: 0.23 sq mi (0.60 km^{2})
- Elevation: 705 ft (215 m)

Population (2020)
  - Total: 240
  - Density: 23.8/sq mi (9.2/km^{2})
- Time zone: UTC-5 (Eastern (EST))
  - Summer (DST): UTC-4 (EDT)
- ZIP code: 49723 (Cross Village)
- Area code: 231
- FIPS code: 26-18900
- GNIS feature ID: 1626141
- Website: Official website

Cross Village Township is a civil township of Emmet County in the U.S. state of Michigan. As of the 2020 census, the township population was 240.

== Communities ==
- Cross Village is an unincorporated community and census-designated place in the township on a rise overlooking Lake Michigan at 45°38′32″N 85°02′15″W. M-119 has its northern terminus here, with Petoskey about 34 miles (55 km) to the south along the Lake Michigan shore.

== History ==
This general area was known as Waganakisi by the Ottawa people. Cross Village itself was a village known to the Ottawa as Anamiewatigoing. It lost its importance when the Jesuit missionaries founded New L'Arbre Croche at what is now Harbor Springs in 1830.

Cross Village, like many of the area's small towns, was once a thriving center for lumber. Because of its location on the lakeshore it was also a fishing community. Cross Village is one of the oldest settlements in Michigan and today is known for its ties to the Ottawa people.

Early records say that Father Jacques Marquette, the famous French Jesuit who endeared himself to the Native American population of northern Michigan, planted a huge white cross on the bluff overlooking Lake Michigan before his death in 1675. As late as 1787, as many as twenty tribes populated the region and met here around tribal council fires. To the Natives who populated the numerous historic missions in the area, Cross Village became known as the "Land of the Cross". To the French, this region was known as "L'Arbre Croche"; to the Ottawas, it was called "Wau-gaw-naw-ke-ze"; and to the English-speaking people at the time, it was simply known as "Land of the Crooked Tree".

Bishop Frederic Baraga is another individual with historical ties to Cross Village. Baraga left a comfortable, aristocratic existence behind when he left Slovenia. He arrived in Michigan in 1830 to serve the Native population and isolated small communities of this region. He spoke and developed written Native languages and is credited for spreading the Gospel among the local Ottawas and Ojibwe. In 1853, Baraga was elevated to Bishop in the Catholic Church, becoming the first bishop in Upper Michigan.

Father Francis Xavier Pierz, Bishop Baraga's friend and fellow Slovenian, was also assigned to Cross Village for many years. Father Pierz, however, was bothered by the increasingly settled nature of the region and departed for the newly organized Minnesota Territory in 1852.

In 1855 Emmet County was reorganized and four new townships were created by the state. One of them was "La Croix", which was officially changed its name to "Cross Village" in 1875.

Today, a replica of Father Marquette's cross stands at the edge of the bluff and is visible from off shore, far into Lake Michigan. Every year a small garden at the base of the cross is lovingly tended by the town's garden club.

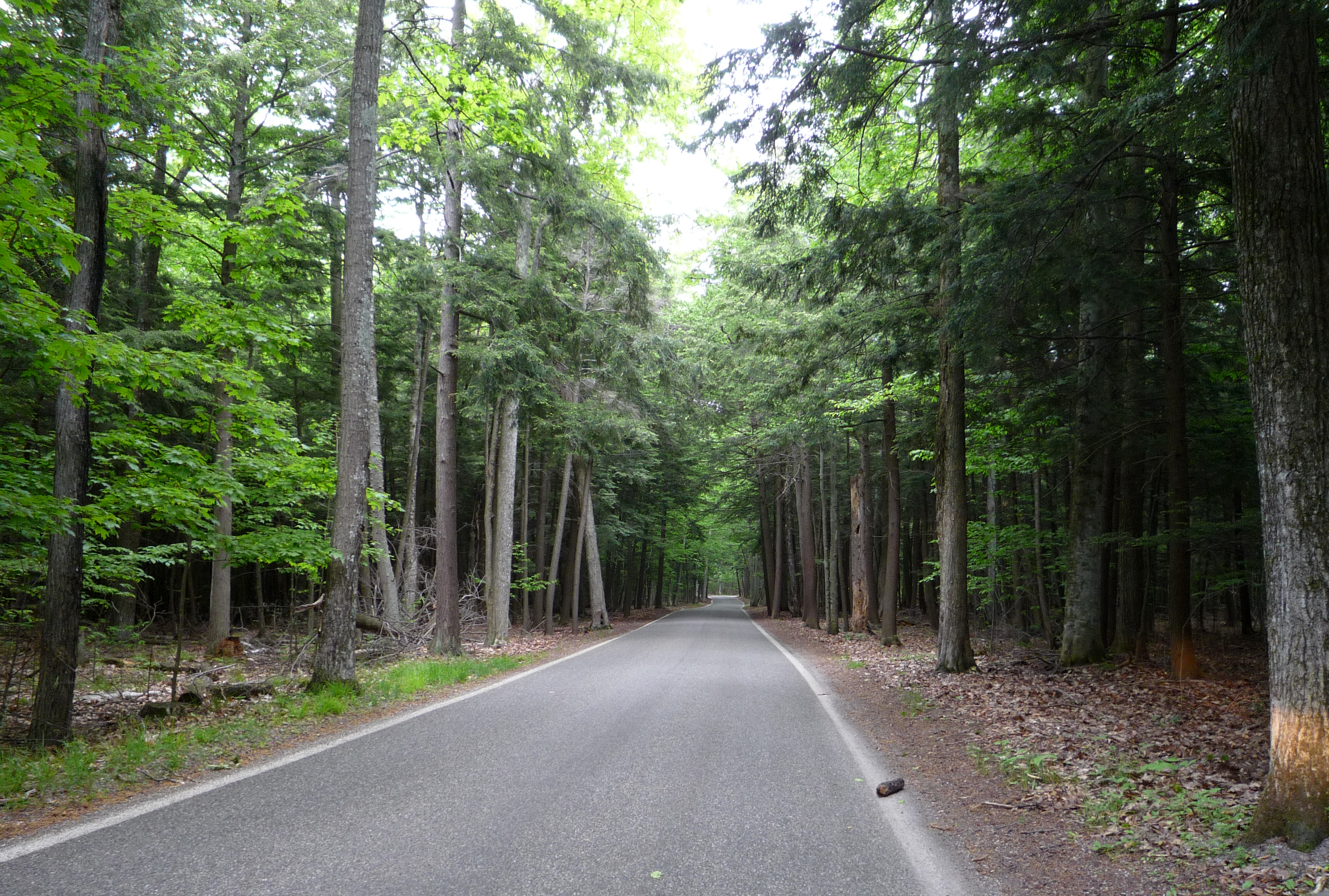
The "Tunnel of Trees" portion of M-119 running between Good Hart and Cross Village

The "Tunnel of Trees" is a scenic drive along the Lake Michigan shoreline between Cross Village and Harbor Springs to the south. The drive is well known for fall color.

Cross Village is also home to Blissfest and the annual pow wow. Blissfest is a summer folk music festival that draws participants from across the nation. It takes place on the Festival Farm on Division Road.

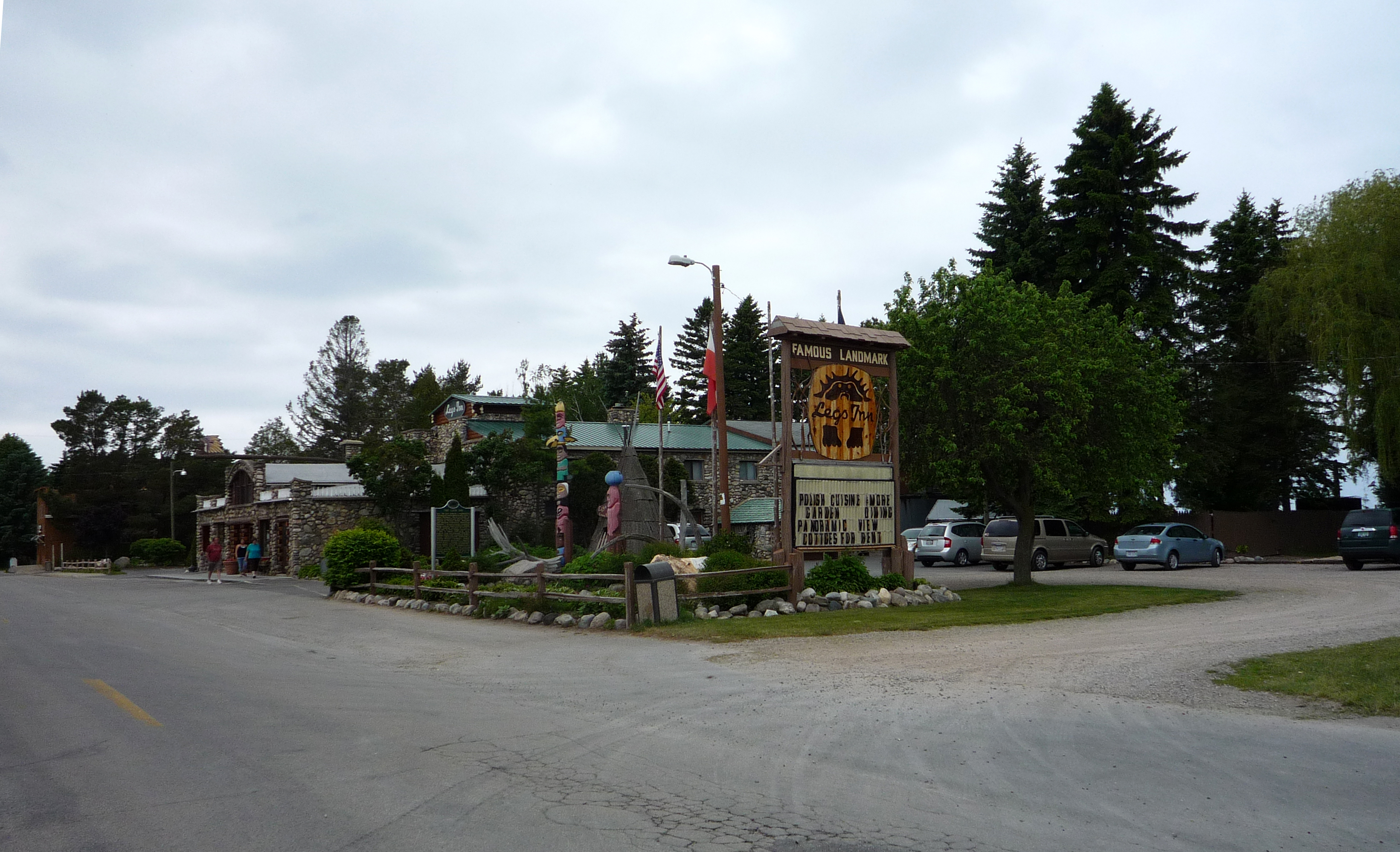
Legs Inn, a landmark restaurant and inn in Cross Village

Parts of the Cross Village area are protected nesting grounds for the endangered piping plover.

== Geography ==
According to the United States Census Bureau, the township has a total area of 10.33 square miles (26.8 km^{2}), of which 10.10 square miles (26.2 km^{2}) is land and 0.23 square miles (0.60 km^{2}) (2.23%) is water.

== Demographics ==
As of the 2010 census Cross Village Township had a population of 281. The racial and ethnic composition of the population was 81.9% white, 13.2% Native American (16.7% when those who reported both Native American and different races are included), 0.4% African American and 4.6% from two or more races. 1.1% of the population was Hispanic or Latino (all of whom were Mexican).

As of the census of 2000, there were 294 people, 132 households, and 86 families residing in the township. The population density was 29.3 inhabitants per square mile (11.3/km^{2}). There were 280 housing units at an average density of 27.9 per square mile (10.8/km^{2}). The racial makeup of the township was 84.69% White, 8.84% Native American, 1.02% Asian, 0.68% Pacific Islander, 0.34% from other races, and 4.42% from two or more races. Hispanic or Latino of any race were 1.02% of the population.

There were 132 households, out of which 15.2% had children under the age of 18 living with them, 56.8% were married couples living together, 5.3% had a female householder with no husband present, and 34.1% were non-families. 28.0% of all households were made up of individuals, and 11.4% had someone living alone who was 65 years of age or older. The average household size was 2.20 and the average family size was 2.67.

In the township the population was spread out, with 15.6% under the age of 18, 4.8% from 18 to 24, 28.9% from 25 to 44, 33.3% from 45 to 64, and 17.3% who were 65 years of age or older. The median age was 46 years. For every 100 females, there were 116.2 males. For every 100 females age 18 and over, there were 112.0 males.

The median income for a household in the township was $46,364, and the median income for a family was $60,417. Males had a median income of $29,375 versus $25,000 for females. The per capita income for the township was $32,535. About 14.3% of families and 20.0% of the population were below the poverty line, including 57.1% of those under the age of eighteen and none of those 65 or over.
