= M119 (disambiguation) =

M119 or M-119 may refer to:

- Mercedes-Benz M119 engine, a V8 automobile engine
- M119 howitzer, a lightweight howitzer used by the United States Army
- M-119 (Michigan highway), a state highway in Michigan
