= M-119 (Michigan highway) =

State highway in Emmet County, Michigan, United States

M-119
- M-119 highlighted in red

Route information
- Maintained by MDOT
- Length: 27.548 mi (44.334 km)
- Existed: 1979 (Note: Sections of M-119 have been a state highway since c. July 1, 1919; it was part of M-13 until 1926 and then M-131 until 1979.)–present
- Tourist routes: Tunnel of Trees Scenic Heritage Route

Major junctions
- South end: US 31 near Bay View
- C-77 in Harbor Springs
- North end: C-66 / C-77 in Cross Village

Location
- Country: United States
- State: Michigan
- Counties: Emmet

Highway system
- Michigan State Trunkline Highway System; Interstate; US; State; Byways
← M-118	→ M-120
← Bus. US 131	M-131	→ M-132

M-119 is a 27.548-mile (44.334 km) state trunkline highway entirely within Emmet County in the US state of Michigan. The highway follows the shore of Lake Michigan and the Little Traverse Bay, with its southern terminus at US Highway 31 (US 31) near Bay View, about four miles (6.4 km) east of Petoskey; the northern terminus is at a junction with county roads C-66 and C-77 in Cross Village. North of Harbor Springs, the highway is known as the Tunnel of Trees Scenic Heritage Route. This section of highway lacks a centerline and is known for its scenery. On an average day, between 2,000 and 15,000 vehicles use various parts of the highway.

The first highway along the route of the modern M-119 was a section of the original M-13 designated by July 1, 1919. This highway was later redesignated M-131 in late 1926, a designation it held until 1979. During this timeframe, another highway bore the M-119 moniker in the southern part of the state near Paw Paw from the 1930s until the early 1970s. In between 1926 and 1979, M-131 was extended and truncated on both its northern and southern ends at various times. Since the M-119 designation was applied to the current highway, no changes have been made to the routing.

== Route description ==
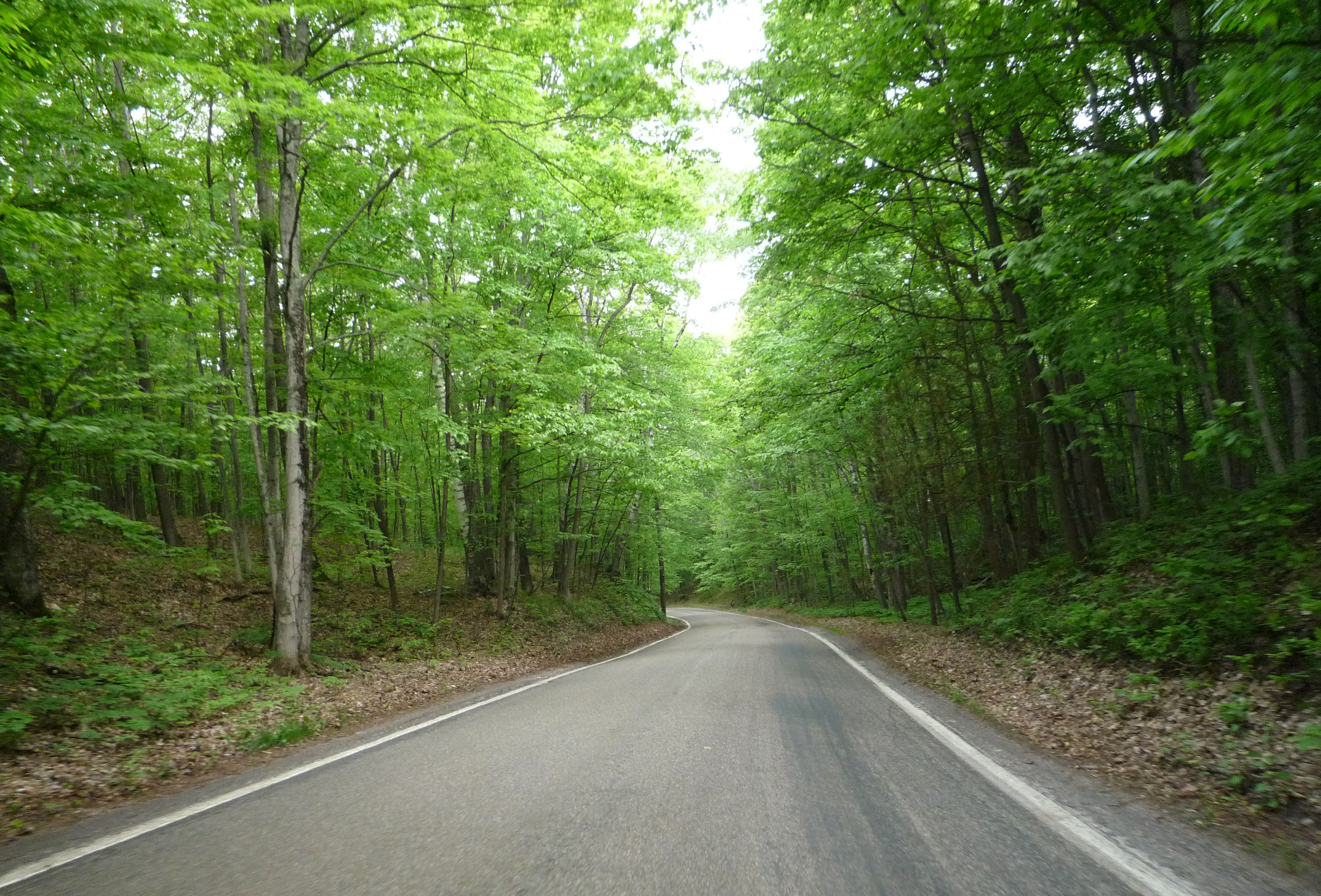
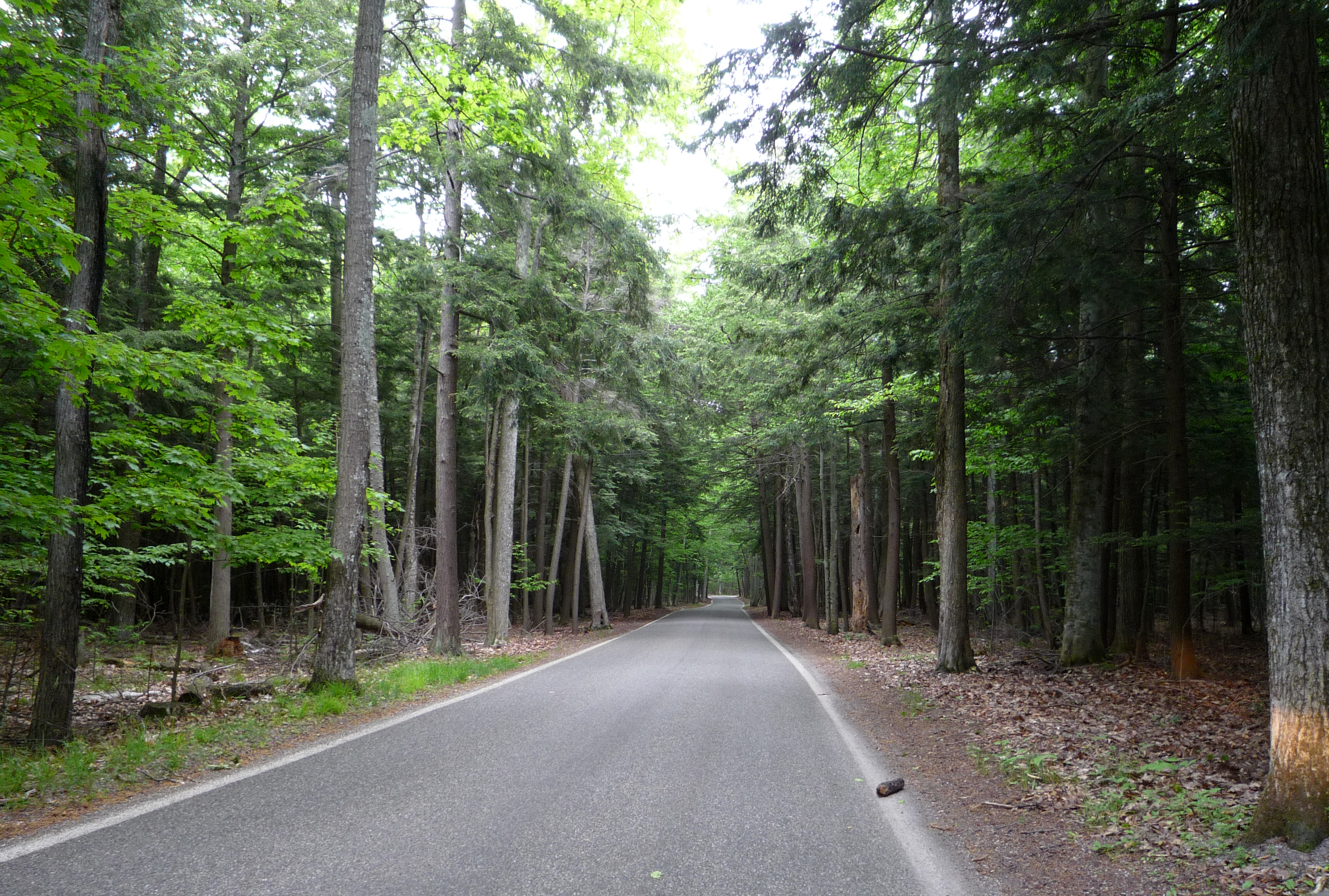
Portions of the Tunnel of Trees section running between Harbor Springs and Good Hart, lacking a centerline

M-119 starts at an intersection with US 31 about four miles (6.4 km) northeast of Petoskey near the community of Bay View in Bear Creek Township. The highway runs north between Petoskey State Park on the west and Round Lake on the east as it rounds the east end of Little Traverse Bay. The trunkline passes the eastern and northern edges of the Harbor Springs Municipal Airport as it turns westward near the junction with C-81 (Pleasantview Road). Through this area, M-119 runs through the community of Wequetonsing and forests just inland from the bay's northern shore. As it passes into the city limits of Harbor Springs, the highway follows Main Street into downtown. It turns north and then westward along State Street in the middle of town, intersecting the southern end of C-77 in the central business district. M-119 continues westward, passing through a residential area on Bluff Drive as it leaves the city.

From Harbor Springs on, M-119 is the Tunnel of Trees Scenic Heritage Route, one of the Pure Michigan Byways in the state. Bluff Drive becomes Lake Shore Drive near the Harbor Point Golf Course, and M-119 turns northward to follow the Lake Michigan shoreline at the mouth of Little Traverse Bay. The roadway meanders through oaks, maples, birch and cedars along an old Ottawa trail. The writers at National Geographic said that "only sometimes can you catch glimmers of Lake Michigan through the trees, but the dense foliage lends beauty to the winding road". Along this area of the routing, the highway narrows in width and continues through the forest without a centerline most of the remainder of the way. As the Michigan Department of Transportation (MDOT) states on their website, "M-119 is not a road for those in a hurry." The roadway is known as the Tunnel of Trees because, "the foliage from trees on either side of the road meets high over the middle of road where it forms a canopy so soft that it lets daylight trickle through in small amounts only." The trunkline continues through the community of Good Hart up the Lake Michigan shoreline to the community of Cross Village. M-119, and state maintenance, end at the intersection between Lake Shore Drive and C-66/C-77 (State Road) in the middle of town.

As part of the state's maintenance of M-119, MDOT tracks the volume of traffic that uses the roadway. MDOT's surveys in 2010 showed that the highest traffic levels along M-119 were the 14,647 vehicles daily near the southern terminus, on average; the lowest counts were the 2,036 vehicles per day at the northern terminus. None of M-119 has been listed on the National Highway System, a network of roads important to the country's economy, defense, and mobility. The Discovery Channel named the roadway as one of the "Top 10 Motorcycle Rides in North America".

== History ==
=== Previous designation ===
The first incarnation c. 1930 of the M-119 designation ran from an intersection four miles (6.4 km) south of US 12 in Paw Paw south to Lawton in Van Buren County. By the middle of 1936, it had been extended farther south to US 112 near Mottville. In 1971, all of M-119 was redesignated as M-40.

=== Current designation ===
M-131
- Location: Bay View–Cross Village
- Length: 27.548 mi (44.334 km)
- Existed: 1926–1979

The current highway was designated in 1979, replacing the former route of M-131; the routing has remained unchanged since. This section of highway had been part of M-13 on July 1, 1919, when the state trunkline highway system debuted. (Note: The first state highways in Michigan were signposted in 1919.) Later on November 11, 1926, M-13 south of Fife Lake was redesignated as part of US 131, and the remainder of M-13 was designated as M-131.

Until 1933, M-131 had terminated in Harbor Springs; the highway was extended to the north along Little Traverse Bay and the Lake Michigan shoreline through the community of Good Hart before terminating in Cross Village. This section of highway would be stripped of its designation in 1937 and truncated back to Harbor Springs. In late 1938 or early 1939, the State Highway Department extended US 131 along the M-131 corridor to Petoskey. This allowed US 131 to finally connect to its parent, US 31 for the first time since their inception in 1926. The MSHD re-extended M-131 back to Cross Village in 1945. The highway remained as such until 1967 when a slight realignment was made in Emmet County along the lakeshore where M-131 was routed on to its final alignment. The southern end was moved in 1969 out of Petoskey so that M-131 would no longer run concurrently with US 31 to connect with US 131.

== Major intersections ==
The entire highway is in Emmet County.

Location	mi	km	Destinations	Notes
Bear Creek Township	0.000	0.000	US 31 / LMCT – Petoskey, Mackinaw City	
Bear Creek Township	3.196	5.143	C-81 north (Pleasantview Road) – Mackinaw City	Southern terminus of C-81
Harbor Springs	7.200	11.587	C-77 north (State Road) – Cross Village	Southern terminus of C-77
Cross Village	27.548	44.334	C-66 east / C-77 south – Cheboygan, Harbor Springs	Western terminus of C-66 and northern terminus of C-77
1.000 mi = 1.609 km; 1.000 km = 0.621 mi

== See also ==
- Tree tunnel
