= Cheboygan County Airport =

Airport in Michigan, United States

- IATA: none; ICAO: KSLH; FAA LID: SLH

Summary
- Airport type: Public
- Owner: Cheboygan Airport Authority
- Serves: Cheboygan, Michigan
- Elevation AMSL: 640 ft (200 m)
- Coordinates: 45°39′13″N 084°31′09″W

Map
- Location of airport in Michigan SLH (the United States)

Runways
Direction	Length		Surface
Direction	ft	m	Surface
10/28	4,005	1,221	Asphalt
17/35	1,600	488	Asphalt

Statistics (2018)
- Aircraft operations: 6,812
- Based aircraft: 18
- Source: Federal Aviation Administration

Cheboygan County Airport (ICAO: KSLH, FAA LID: SLH) is a public use airport located two nautical miles (3.7 km) west of the central business district of Cheboygan, a city in Cheboygan County, Michigan, United States. It is owned by the Cheboygan Airport Authority. It is included in the Federal Aviation Administration (FAA) National Plan of Integrated Airport Systems for 2017–2021, in which it is categorized as a basic general aviation facility. The airport is accessible from Levering Road and is close to US Highway 23.

Although many U.S. airports use the same three-letter location identifier for the FAA and IATA, this airport is assigned SLH by the FAA and no designation from the IATA (which assigned SLH to Sola Airport on Vanua Lava, one of the Banks Islands, in Torba Province, Vanuatu).

== Facilities and aircraft ==
Cheboygan County Airport covers an area of 350 acres (140 ha) at an elevation of 639 feet (195 m) above mean sea level. It has two runways: 10/28 is 4,005 by 75 feet (1,221 x 23 m) with an asphalt pavement and 16/34 is 1,600 by 75 feet (488 x 23 m) also with an asphalt surface.

The airport has a fixed-base operator that offers fuel, hangaring, general maintenance, courtesy transportation, a conference room, a crew lounge, and more.

For the 12-month period ending December 31, 2018, the airport had 6,812 general aviation aircraft operations, an average of 131 per week. At that time there were 18 aircraft based at this airport: 18 single-engine and 1 multi-engine airplanes.

The airport is staffed between 8:30 AM and 4:30 PM.

== Accidents and incidents ==
- On December 5, 2017, a Piper Cherokee Six was substantially damaged upon landing. The pilot reported an suddenly-excessive rate of descent on approach. He tried applying power, but the aircraft touched down hard and there was an audible pop. The airplane exited the runway to the right and struck runway lights. The probable cause was found to be the pilot’s failure to maintain the airplane’s rate of descent in gusting wind conditions resulting in a hard landing and runway excursion.
- On June 30, 2021, a Cessna 172RG experienced an emergency landing at the airport when its landing gear failed to deploy. The sole pilot aboard was uninjured.

== See also ==
- List of airports in Michigan
