= Conway, Michigan =

- Census-designated place (CDP) & unincorporated community
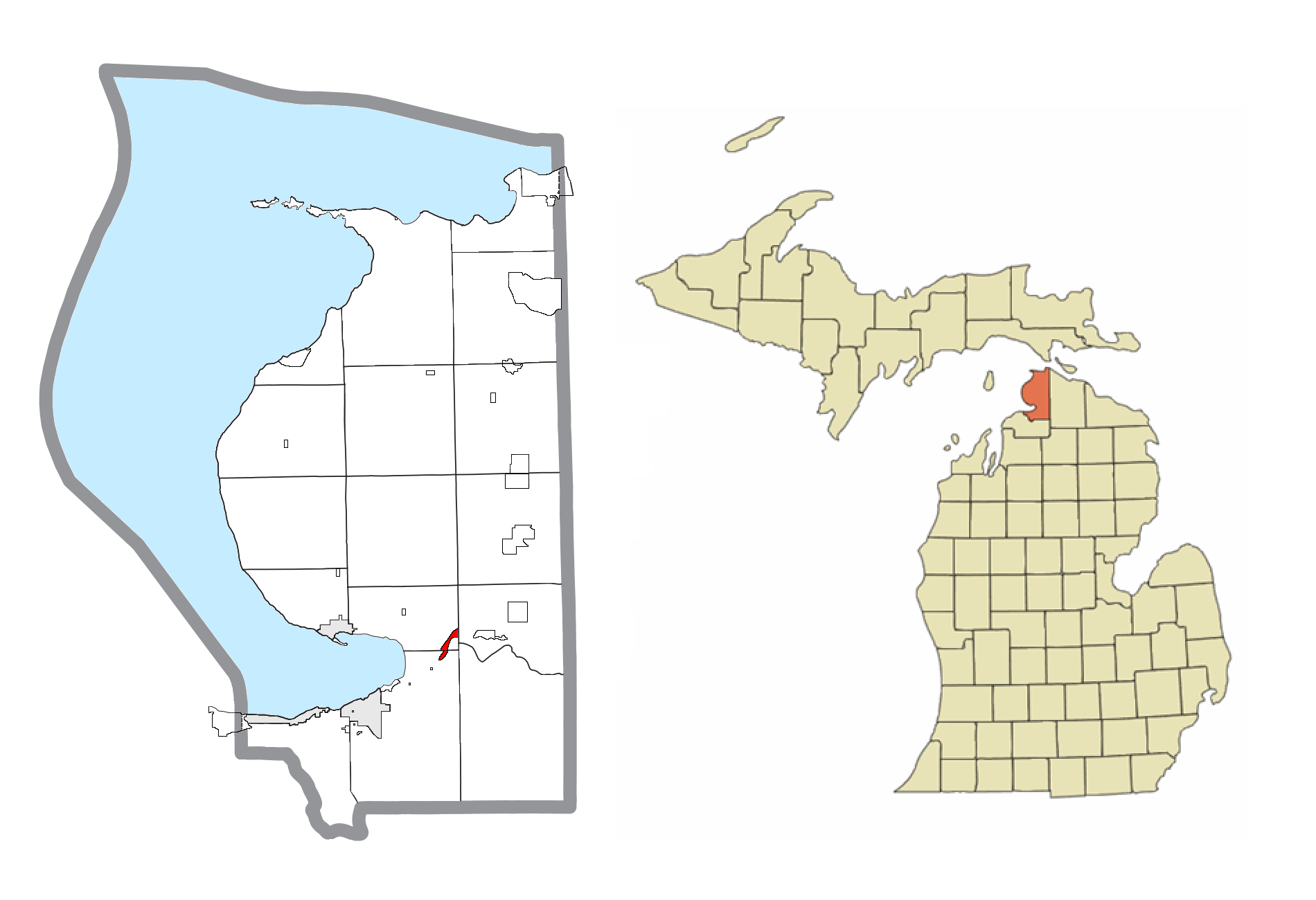
- Location within Emmet County

- Location within the state of Michigan Conway (the United States)
- Coordinates: 45°25′01″N 84°51′55″W
- Country: United States
- State: Michigan
- County: Emmet
- Townships: Bear Creek and Little Traverse

Area
  - Total: 0.42 sq mi (1.10 km^{2})
  - Land: 0.42 sq mi (1.09 km^{2})
  - Water: 0.0039 sq mi (0.01 km^{2})
- Elevation: 603 ft (183.8 m)

Population (2020)
  - Total: 338
  - Density: 802.7/sq mi (309.91/km^{2})
- Time zone: UTC-5 (Eastern (EST))
  - Summer (DST): UTC-4 (EDT)
- ZIP code(s): 49722
- Area code: 231
- FIPS code: 26-17900
- GNIS feature ID: 623717

Conway is an unincorporated community and census-designated place (CDP) in Emmet County in the U.S. state of Michigan. As of the 2020 census, Conway had a population of 338.

== Geography ==
Conway is located in southeastern Emmet County, in southeastern Little Traverse Township. A portion of the CDP extends south into Bear Creek Township. The community is at the western end of Crooked Lake. U.S. Route 31 passes through the CDP, leading southwest 6 miles (10 km) to Petoskey, the county seat, and northeast 5 miles (8 km) to Alanson.

The community of Conway was listed as a newly-organized census-designated place for the 2010 census, meaning it now has officially defined boundaries and population statistics for the first time.

According to the U.S. Census Bureau, the Conway CDP has a total area of 0.42 square miles (1.1 km^{2}), all of it land.

== Demographics ==
Historical population
Census	Pop.	Note	%±
2020	338		—
U.S. Decennial Census
