= Little Traverse Bay =

Bay on Lake Michigan in Emmet County, Michigan, United States

- Petite Traverse Bay
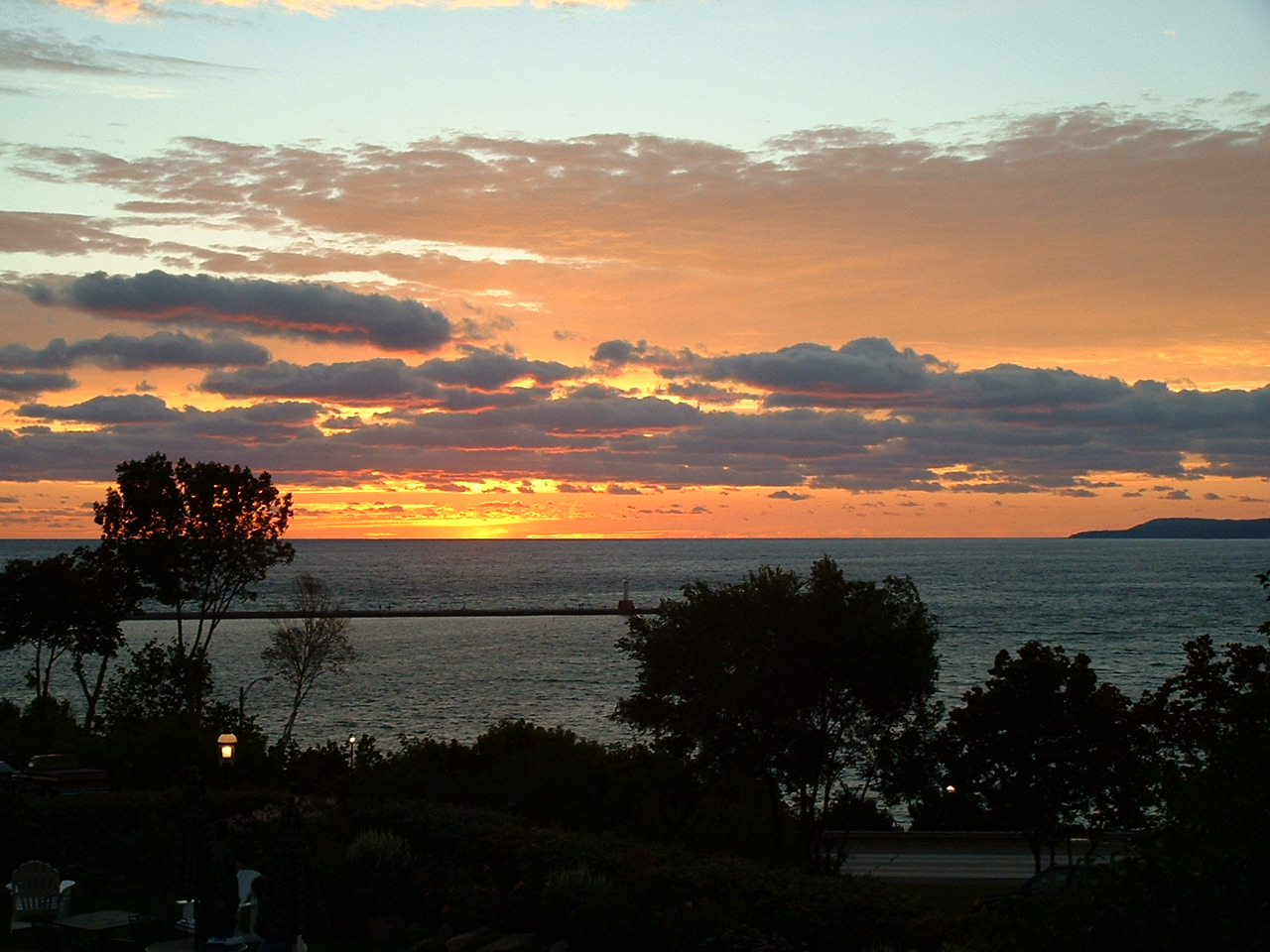
- Little Traverse Bay at sunset, viewed from Petoskey

- Location within Michigan Location within the United States
- Location: Charlevoix & Emmet counties, Michigan, U.S.
- Coordinates: 45.4°N 85°W
- Type: Bay
- Part of: St. Lawrence Watershed
- Primary inflows: Bear River
- Primary outflows: Lake Michigan
- Surface elevation: 581 feet (177 m)
- Islands: none
- Settlements: Harbor Springs, Petoskey

Little Traverse Bay (/ˈtrævərs/ TRAV-ərss) is a small open bay of Lake Michigan. Extending about 10 miles (16 km) into the Lower Peninsula of Michigan, much of the head of the land surrounding Little Traverse Bay, and has become part of the urban areas of Petoskey and Harbor Springs. Little Traverse Bay primarily lies within Emmet County, although a small portion lies within Charlevoix County.

== Overview ==
Harbor Springs, a settlement on the bay, originated as L'arbre de Croche, (Crooked Tree) a French Jesuit mission village to serve the Odawa people bands in the area. After the British took over the territory, the village was renamed in English. The federally recognized Little Traverse Bay Bands of Odawa Indians have their headquarters here. They have land here, and additional land and a gaming casino in Petoskey.

The Little Traverse Light marks the entrance at Harbor Springs to the smaller harbor within the bay.

After the Odawa bands in northern Michigan were persuaded to cede considerable lands to the United States, the Little Traverse Bay region was developed by Illinois land developers and resort founders, such as lawyers Henry Stryker III and Henry Brigham McClure, and the Capps family of Jacksonville, Illinois and woolen mills fame. The Stryker, Capps, and McClure families were interconnected with the Jacob Bunn industrial dynasty of Chicago and Springfield, Illinois.

The bay has also been used as a refuge by Great Lakes freighters during severe weather.

== Settlements ==
- Bay Shore
- Bay View
- Forest Beach
- Harbor Springs
- Harbor Point
- Petoskey
- Wequetonsing

== Recreation ==
The bay has significant publicly accessible parkland on the waterfront, including in the cities of Petoskey and Harbor Springs, and in Petoskey State Park.

Little Traverse Bay is popular during the summer for boating, sailing and swimming by the numerous vacation communities on the bay, including Bay View, Wequetonsing, and Harbor Point. Many of these communities also provide sailing and swimming lessons.

The bay is the location of the annual Ugotta Regatta, hosted by the Little Traverse Yacht Club in Harbor Springs. Participants are often boat owners and crews who have sailed in the Chicago Yacht Club Race to Mackinac and Port Huron to Mackinac Boat Race, each held on one of the two weekends before.
