= Petoskey State Park =

Park in Michigan, US

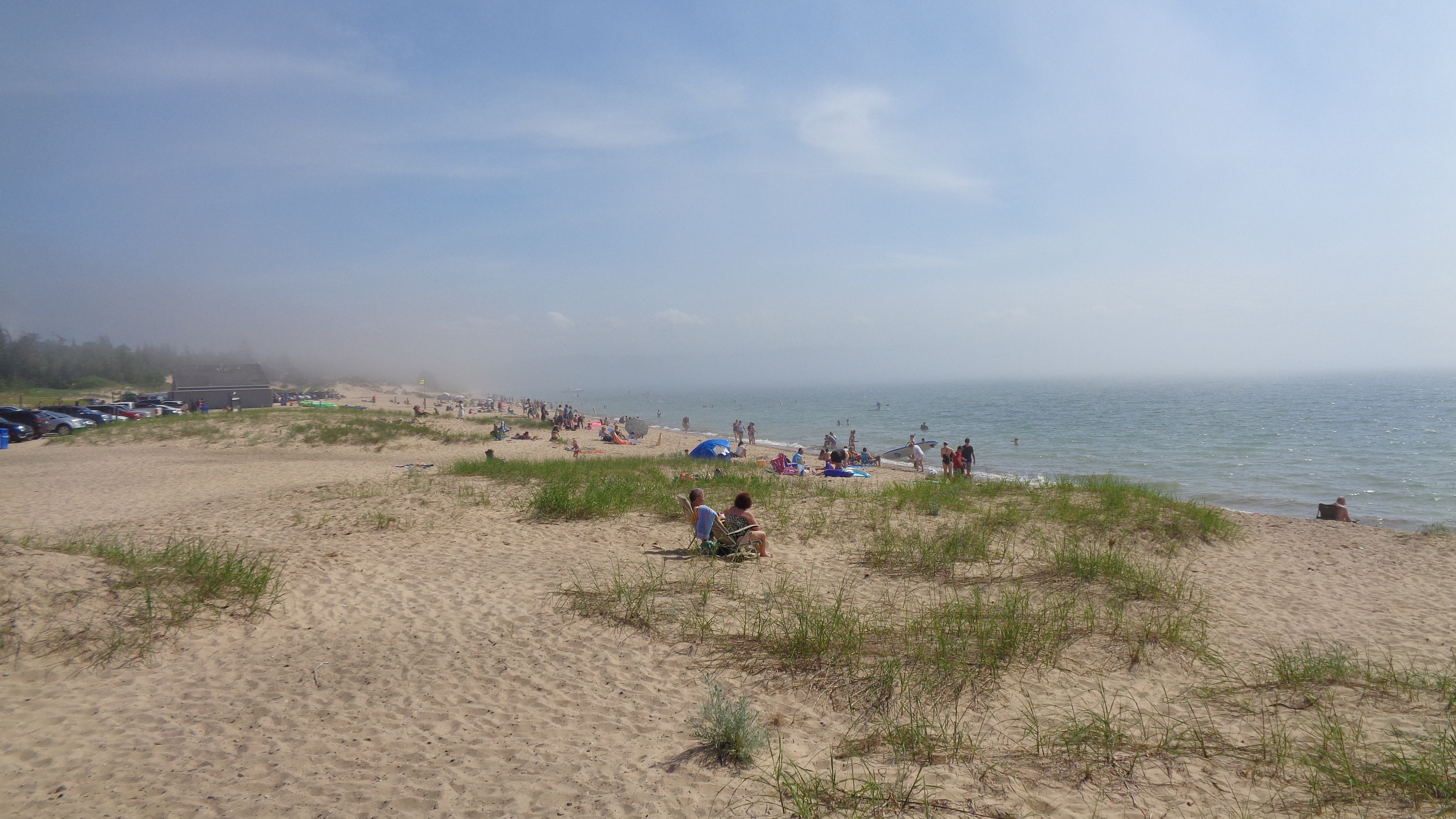
- Beachfront along Lake Michigan

- Location within Michigan Location within the United States
- Location: Emmet County, Michigan, United States
- Nearest city: Petoskey, Michigan
- Coordinates: 45°24′05″N 84°54′30″W
- Area: 303 acres (123 ha)
- Elevation: 630 feet (190 m)
- Established: 1961
- Administrator: Michigan Department of Natural Resources
- Designation: Michigan State Park
- Website: Official website

Petoskey State Park is a public recreation area covering 303 acres (123 ha) on Lake Michigan in Bear Creek Township, Emmet County, Michigan. The state park is located three miles (4.8 km) northeast of the city of Petoskey on Little Traverse Bay. It is surrounded by heavily vegetated sand dunes that are excellent examples of parabolic dunes. Michigan's state stone, the Petoskey stone, can be found on the park beach.

== History ==
The park occupies part of the site where William Wirt Rice (1833–1891) built a tannery in 1885 at the mouth of what came to be called Tannery Creek. The tannery occupied 180 acres that were eventually divided between Petoskey State Park and the commercial district on U.S. Highway 31. At its peak, the tannery employed some 200 workers and processed over 1000 hides—primarily buffalo—per day. The tannery closed in 1952, and its buildings were torn down in 1963. The City of Petoskey purchased a portion of the tannery's land north of Tannery Creek in 1934 and created the Petoskey Bathing Beach. The City of Petoskey purchased a portion of the tannery's land north of Tannery Creek in 1934 and created the Petoskey Bathing Beach. The Michigan Conservation Commission approved the creation of Petoskey State Park on the old tannery lands—with the potentiality of also purchasing the city's bathing beach for inclusion as well—in June 1961. The large southern portion of the park property was purchased by the State in 1962, although no park development occurred for another several years. The State of Michigan purchased the beach from the City of Petoskey for $150,000 in 1968, took title in 1969, and the first 90 sites in the park's campground opened in June 1970.

== Activities and amenities ==
The park offers a mile-long sand beach for swimming, a trail that ascends the Old Baldy sand dune, picnicking facilities, and a 178-site campground.
