= Magangué =

- Municipality and city
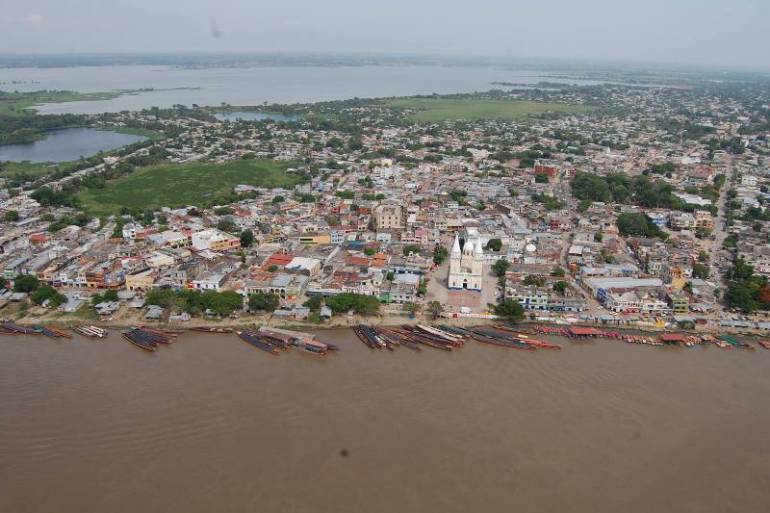
- Aerial view

- Flag Coat of arms
- Nicknames: City of the Rivers, Cosmopolitan City
- Motto: "Wealth And Prosperity" / "Riqueza y Prosperidad"
- Location of the municipality and city of Magangué in the Bolívar Department of Colombia.

- Location in Colombia
- Coordinates: 9°15′N 74°46′W
- Country: Colombia
- Department: Bolívar Department
- Region: Caribbean
- Founded: April 10, 1610
- Erection: February 13, 1813

Government
  - Type: Mayor and Secretary-General
  - Mayor: Carlos Emil Cabrales Isaac

Area
  - Total: 1,568 km^{2} (605 sq mi)
  - Land: 1,043 km^{2} (403 sq mi)
  - Water: 525 km^{2} (203 sq mi) 33.48%
- Elevation: 49 m (161 ft)

Population (2019 est.)
  - Total: 123,982
  - Density: 118.9/km^{2} (307.9/sq mi)
  - Demonym: Magangueleño(a) or Magueño(a)
- Time zone: UTC-5 (Colombia Standard Time)

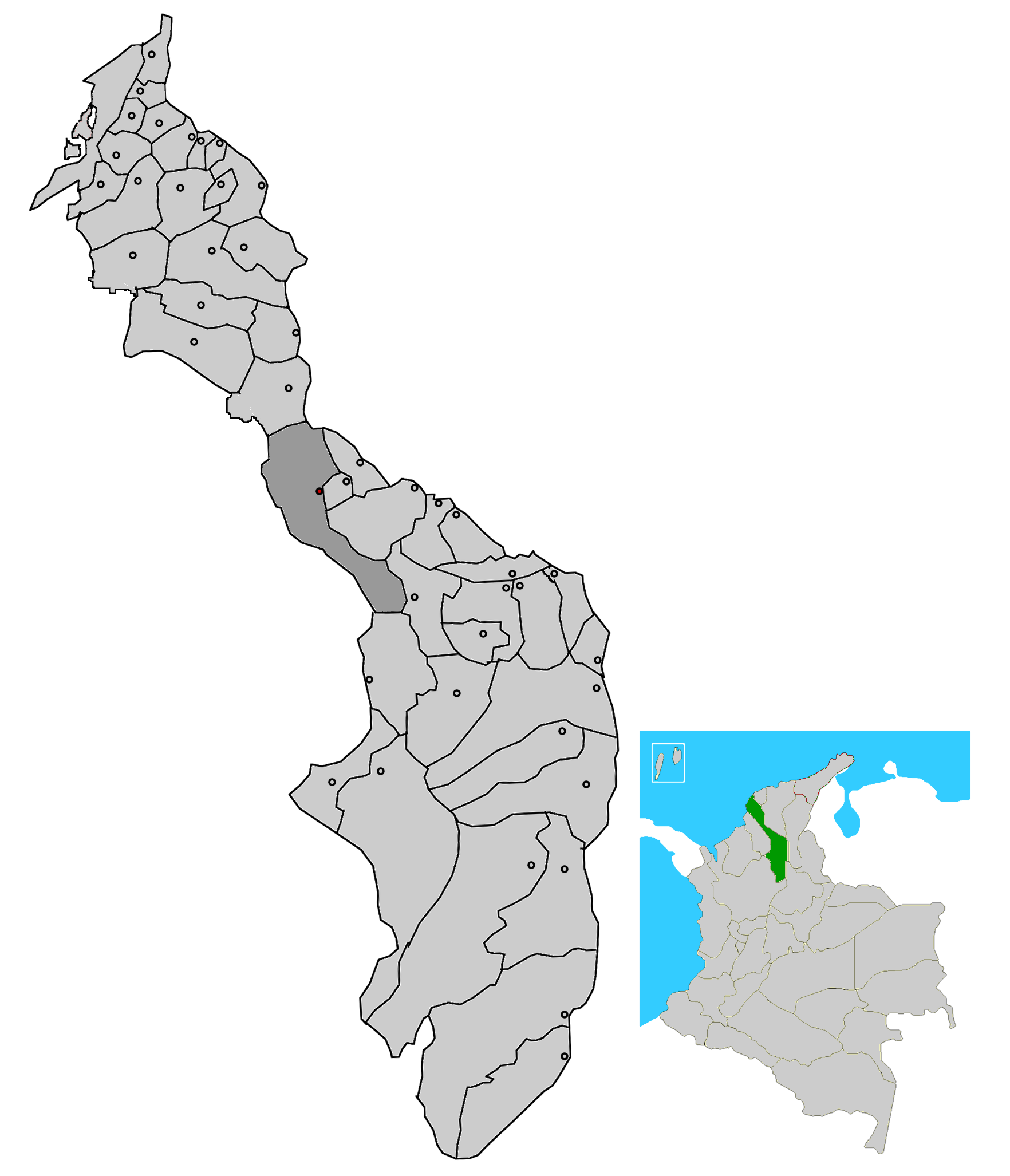
Location of the municipality and city of Magangué in the Bolivar Department.

Magangué is a Colombian city and municipality in the Department of Bolívar. The city is located in the Magdalena River; 20 km north of the mouth of the Cauca River, the Magdalena River. According to projections, the city has a population of over 141000 inhabitants. It is the second largest city of the department. Magangué was home to the country's largest port. It has been shown that the city has great national potential, due to its strategic location.

== History ==
Studies and research are still in their infancy, there are only approaches and assumptions based on interpretations of the records left by some writers and settlers who came from Spain. Most of them assert that original population were indigenous belonging to the family Chimilas Carib language that inhabited the extensive river and lake region of Bolivar, Sucre, Magdalena and Cesar departments. The highest regional authority was the Chimilas Mompox and her chiefdoms: Maguey, Yati, or Simacoa Tacaloa, etc. Guazo. The indigenous people had an average height of 1.65 meters, were more or less heavyset, had black hair, short legs, dark skin and short prominent noses. Despite speaking a language related to that of the Carib people, who were warlike and resisted the Spaniards, the Maguey were peaceful and docile. They mainly engaged in the farming of cassava and corn and were also experts in fishing and hunting. Both men and women engaged in these tasks.

== Administrative divisions ==
Magangué is organized in 43 Populated centers:

The major townships are:

- Barranco de Yuca
- Barbosa
- Cascajal
- Coyongal
- El Retiro
- Juan Arias
- Santa Fe
- Yatí

== Climate ==
Climate data for Magangué (Baracoa Regional Airport), elevation 18 m (59 ft), (1981–2010)
| Month | Jan | Feb | Mar | Apr | May | Jun | Jul | Aug | Sep | Oct | Nov | Dec | Year |
|---|---|---|---|---|---|---|---|---|---|---|---|---|---|
| Mean daily maximum °C (°F) | 34.0 (93.2) | 34.7 (94.5) | 35.2 (95.4) | 34.4 (93.9) | 32.9 (91.2) | 32.5 (90.5) | 33.0 (91.4) | 33.0 (91.4) | 32.1 (89.8) | 31.6 (88.9) | 32.0 (89.6) | 33.1 (91.6) | 33.1 (91.6) |
| Daily mean °C (°F) | 28.0 (82.4) | 28.8 (83.8) | 29.1 (84.4) | 29.0 (84.2) | 28.2 (82.8) | 28.1 (82.6) | 28.3 (82.9) | 28.2 (82.8) | 27.6 (81.7) | 27.3 (81.1) | 27.4 (81.3) | 27.7 (81.9) | 28.1 (82.6) |
| Mean daily minimum °C (°F) | 22.2 (72.0) | 22.8 (73.0) | 23.5 (74.3) | 24.2 (75.6) | 24.0 (75.2) | 23.5 (74.3) | 23.7 (74.7) | 23.5 (74.3) | 23.1 (73.6) | 23.2 (73.8) | 23.4 (74.1) | 23.1 (73.6) | 23.3 (73.9) |
| Average precipitation mm (inches) | 10.8 (0.43) | 17.4 (0.69) | 44.4 (1.75) | 88.2 (3.47) | 142.8 (5.62) | 151.2 (5.95) | 175.7 (6.92) | 162.8 (6.41) | 177.8 (7.00) | 152.0 (5.98) | 99.0 (3.90) | 47.3 (1.86) | 1,251.2 (49.26) |
| Average precipitation days (≥ 1.0 mm) | 1 | 2 | 3 | 7 | 10 | 10 | 11 | 12 | 14 | 13 | 8 | 4 | 92 |
| Average relative humidity (%) | 76 | 74 | 74 | 75 | 80 | 81 | 80 | 81 | 83 | 84 | 84 | 80 | 79 |
| Mean monthly sunshine hours | 257.3 | 217.4 | 201.5 | 168.0 | 158.1 | 183.0 | 210.8 | 201.5 | 165.0 | 151.9 | 171.0 | 223.2 | 2,308.7 |
| Mean daily sunshine hours | 8.3 | 7.7 | 6.5 | 5.6 | 5.1 | 6.1 | 6.8 | 6.5 | 5.5 | 4.9 | 5.7 | 7.2 | 6.3 |
Source: Instituto de Hidrologia Meteorologia y Estudios Ambientales
