= Cross Village, Michigan =

- Census-designated place (CDP) & unincorporated community
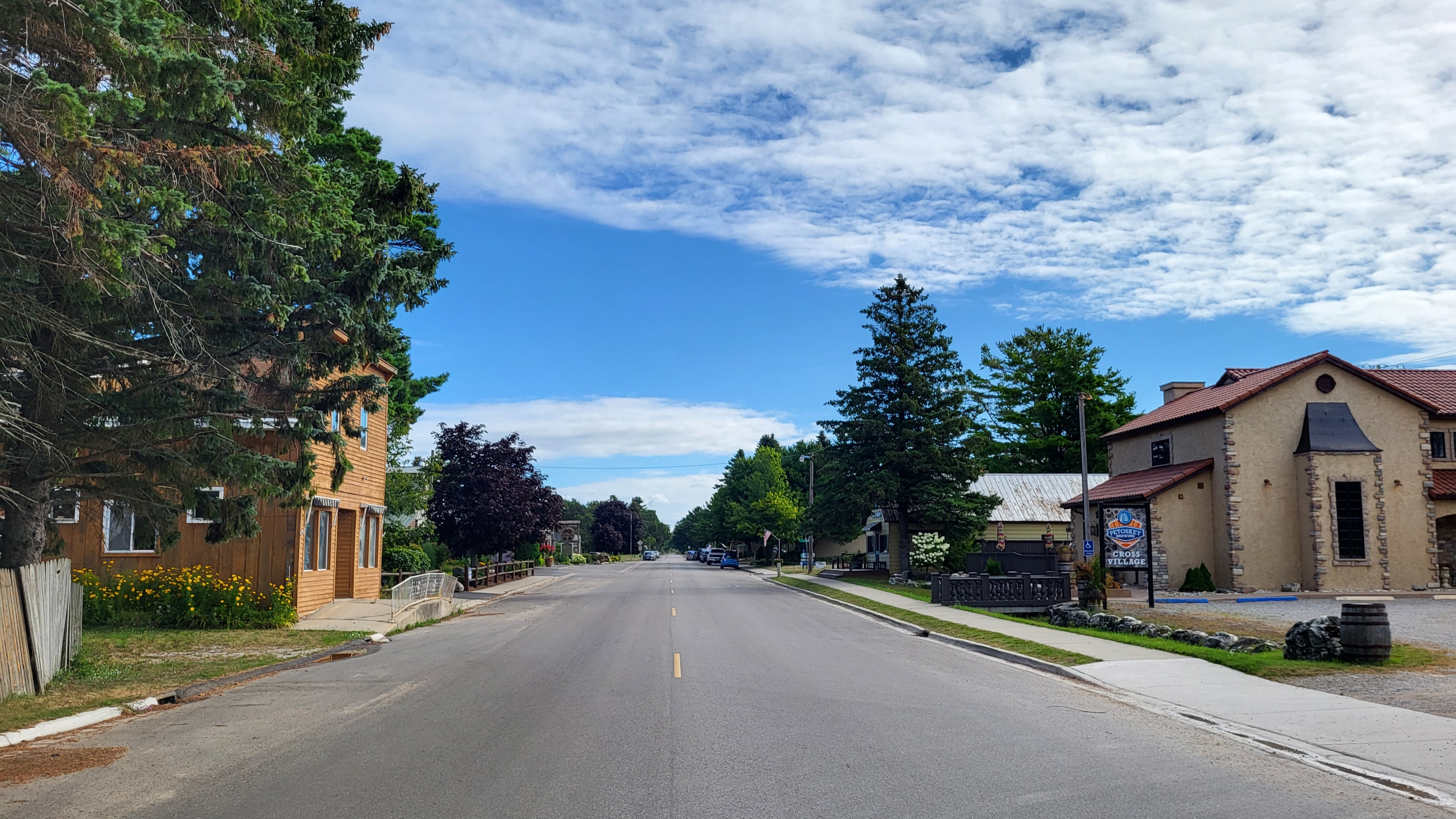
- Looking northeast along N. Lake Shore Drive

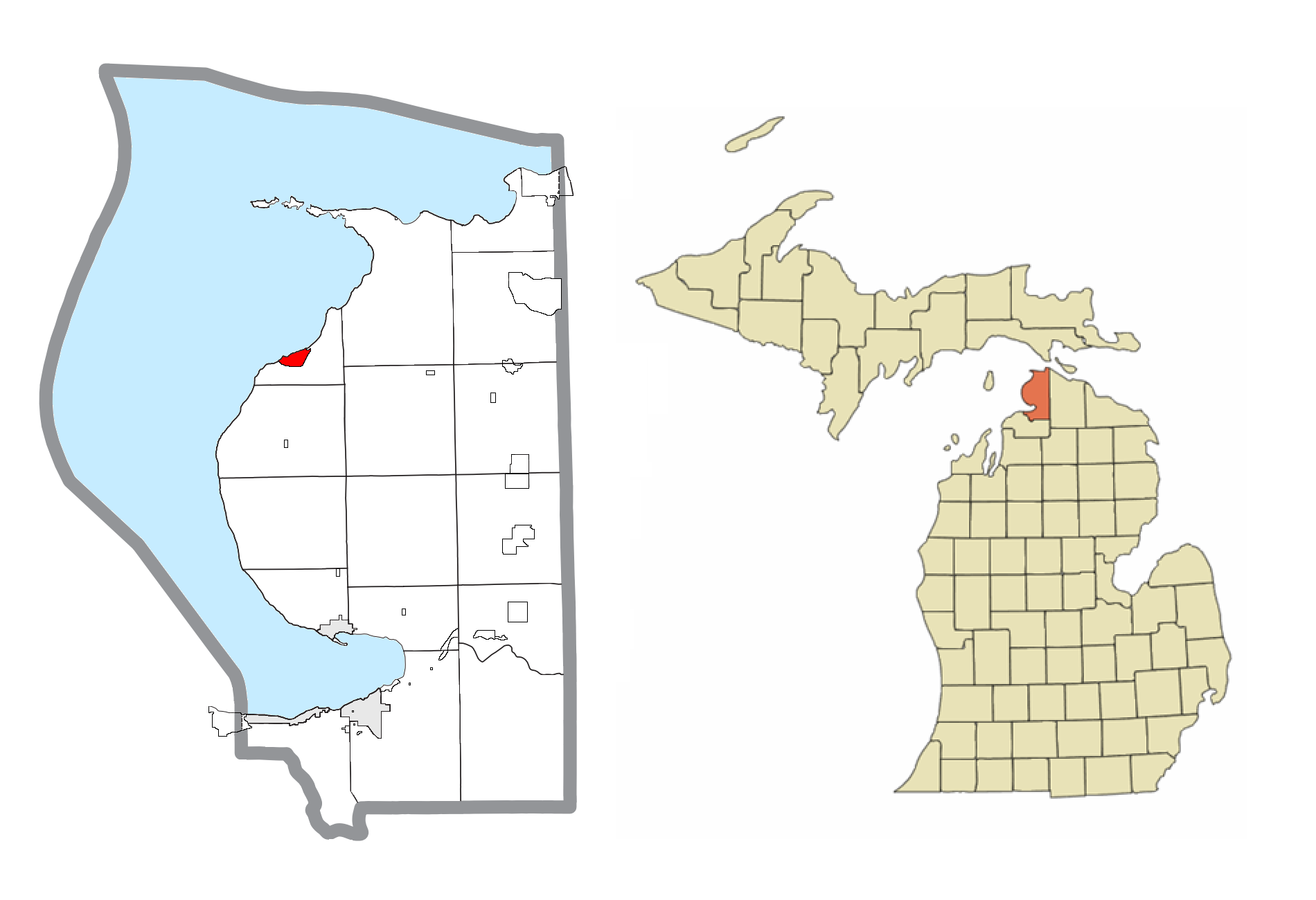
- Location within Emmet County

- Location within the state of Michigan Location within the United States
- Coordinates: 45°38′32″N 85°02′15″W
- Country: United States
- State: Michigan
- County: Emmet
- Township: Cross Village

Area
  - Total: 0.76 sq mi (1.98 km^{2})
  - Land: 0.76 sq mi (1.98 km^{2})
  - Water: 0 sq mi (0.00 km^{2})
- Elevation: 668 ft (203.5 m)

Population (2020)
  - Total: 79
  - Density: 103.5/sq mi (39.97/km^{2})
- Time zone: UTC-5 (Eastern (EST))
  - Summer (DST): UTC-4 (EDT)
- ZIP code(s): 49723
- Area code: 231
- FIPS code: 26-18880
- GNIS feature ID: 624123

Cross Village is an unincorporated community and census-designated place (CDP) in Emmet County in the U.S. state of Michigan. As of the 2010 census, the CDP had a population of 93. It is located within Cross Village Township on the shores of Lake Michigan. Cross village had been established by the Natives in the area. The cross was a symbol of the sacred fire. Some of the religious First Nations were sent over to Europe to further practice christianity.

== Geography ==
Cross Village is located in northwestern Emmet County, on the shore of Lake Michigan at the southern limit of Sturgeon Bay. The community is in Cross Village Township. The northern terminus of M-119 is in Cross Village; the highway runs south along the lakeshore 20 miles (32 km) to Harbor Springs. Petoskey, the county seat, is 25 miles (40 km) south of Cross Village via State Road, an inland route.

The community of Cross Village was listed as a newly-organized census-designated place for the 2010 census, meaning it now has officially defined boundaries and population statistics for the first time.

According to the U.S. Census Bureau, the Cross Village CDP has a total area of 0.73 square miles (1.9 km^{2}), all of it land.

=== Climate ===
Climate data for Cross Village 1E, Michigan (1991–2020 normals, extremes 1969–present)
Month	Jan	Feb	Mar	Apr	May	Jun	Jul	Aug	Sep	Oct	Nov	Dec	Year
Record high °F (°C)	55 (13)	61 (16)	84 (29)	89 (32)	90 (32)	90 (32)	95 (35)	93 (34)	90 (32)	82 (28)	76 (24)	65 (18)	95 (35)
Mean daily maximum °F (°C)	26.6 (−3.0)	28.1 (−2.2)	37.4 (3.0)	49.4 (9.7)	62.4 (16.9)	70.3 (21.3)	74.1 (23.4)	73.6 (23.1)	67.0 (19.4)	54.6 (12.6)	43.1 (6.2)	32.7 (0.4)	51.6 (10.9)
Daily mean °F (°C)	19.9 (−6.7)	20.1 (−6.6)	28.3 (−2.1)	39.7 (4.3)	51.7 (10.9)	60.8 (16.0)	65.6 (18.7)	65.4 (18.6)	58.8 (14.9)	47.6 (8.7)	37.1 (2.8)	27.4 (−2.6)	43.5 (6.4)
Mean daily minimum °F (°C)	13.3 (−10.4)	12.2 (−11.0)	19.2 (−7.1)	30.0 (−1.1)	41.1 (5.1)	51.4 (10.8)	57.1 (13.9)	57.1 (13.9)	50.6 (10.3)	40.6 (4.8)	31.2 (−0.4)	22.2 (−5.4)	35.5 (1.9)
Record low °F (°C)	−27 (−33)	−29 (−34)	−19 (−28)	2 (−17)	22 (−6)	29 (−2)	34 (1)	35 (2)	25 (−4)	18 (−8)	1 (−17)	−20 (−29)	−29 (−34)
Average precipitation inches (mm)	1.79 (45)	1.23 (31)	1.90 (48)	2.90 (74)	3.04 (77)	3.20 (81)	2.77 (70)	3.00 (76)	3.83 (97)	4.39 (112)	2.92 (74)	2.23 (57)	33.20 (843)
Average snowfall inches (cm)	20.9 (53)	16.9 (43)	9.7 (25)	5.7 (14)	0.1 (0.25)	0.0 (0.0)	0.0 (0.0)	0.0 (0.0)	0.0 (0.0)	0.1 (0.25)	5.9 (15)	20.2 (51)	79.5 (202)
Average precipitation days (≥ 0.01 in)	12.7	9.5	9.6	10.7	11.5	11.2	10.7	10.0	12.2	16.0	13.4	13.4	140.9
Average snowy days (≥ 0.1 in)	13.4	10.0	6.1	2.8	0.1	0.0	0.0	0.0	0.0	0.2	4.6	10.9	48.1
Source: NOAA

== Demographics ==
Historical population
Census	Pop.	Note	%±
2020	79		—
U.S. Decennial Census

As of the census of 2010, there were 93 people, 50 households, and 26 families residing in the CDP. The population density was 127 inhabitants per square mile (49/km^{2}). There were 110 housing units at an average density of 157.1 per square mile (60.7/km^{2}). The racial and ethnic composition of the population was 87.1% white, 1.1% African American and 11.8% Native American. There were no Hispanic or Latino people of any race in the community.

There were 50 households, out of which 16.0% had children under the age of 18 living with them, 40.0% were headed by married couples living together, 6.0% had a female householder with no husband present, and 48.0% were non-families. 46.0% of all households were made up of individuals, and 14.0% were someone living alone who was 65 years of age or older. The average household size was 1.86, and the average family size was 2.62.

In the CDP, the population was spread out, with 16.1% under the age of 18, 2.2% from 18 to 24, 13.0% from 25 to 44, 47.4% from 45 to 64, and 21.5% who were 65 years of age or older. The median age was 53.9 years. For every 10 females there were 12.7 males. For every 10 females age 18 and over, there were 12.3 males.

For the period 2010–14, the estimated median annual income for a household in the township was $36,750, and the median income for a family was $51,250. Male full-time workers had a median income of $55,625 versus $40,313 for females. The per capita income for the CDP was $20,203. About 8.3% of families and 15.9% of the population were below the poverty line, including 13.0% of those under the age of 18 and none of those 65 or over.
