= Baracoa Regional Airport =

Baracoa Regional Airport Aeropuerto Baracoa de Magangue
- IATA: MGN; ICAO: SKMG

Summary
- Airport type: Regional
- Operator: LANZA
- Location: Magangué
- Elevation AMSL: 178 ft (54 m)
- Coordinates: 9°17′05″N 74°50′45″W

Map
- Location of the airport in Colombia

Runways
Direction	Length		Surface
Direction	m	ft	Surface
11/29	1,500	4,921	Asphalt
- Sources: WAD GCM Google Maps

The Baracoa Regional Airport (IATA: MGN, ICAO: SKMG) is an airport serving the city of Magangué in the Bolívar Department of Colombia.

The Baracoa Regional Airport used to be a hub for airline operations such as Avianca, LANZA and Satena. However, on January 4, 1969, the airport ceased its commercial passenger flight operations and closed its flight schools, following a decision to focus on traffic from smaller aircraft.

The Magangue VOR-DME (Ident: MGN) is located on the field.

== See also ==
- Transport in Colombia
- List of airports in Colombia
