= Little Traverse Township, Michigan =

Little Traverse Township
- Civil township
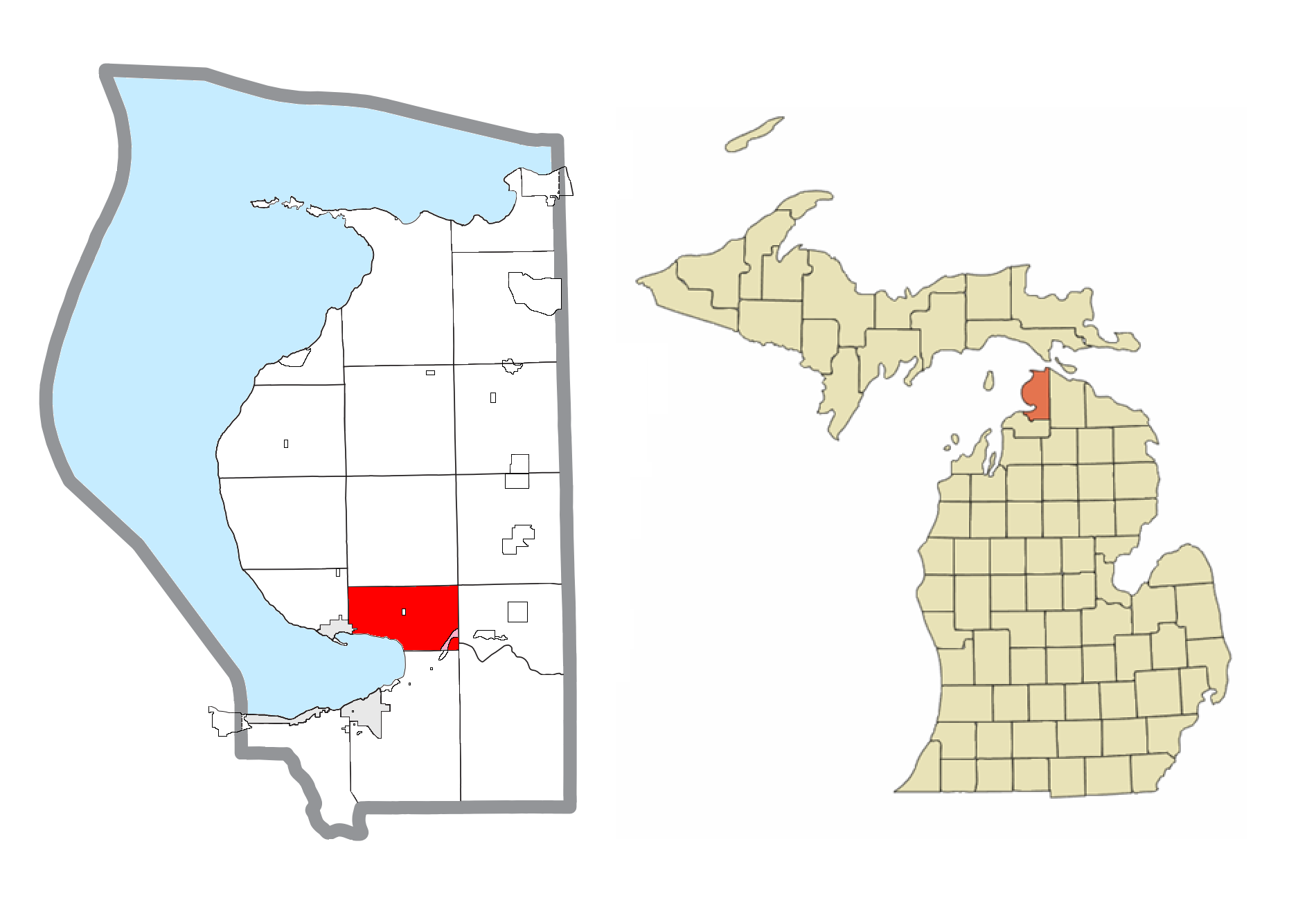
- Location within Emmet County (red) and an administered portion of the Conway community (pink)

- Location within the state of Michigan Little Traverse Township (the United States)
- Coordinates: 45°26′00″N 84°55′11″W
- Country: United States
- State: Michigan
- County: Emmet
- Established: 1855

Government
  - Supervisor: William Dohm
  - Clerk: Lynda Arman

Area
  - Total: 20.36 sq mi (52.7 km^{2})
  - Land: 17.96 sq mi (46.5 km^{2})
  - Water: 2.40 sq mi (6.2 km^{2})
- Elevation: 735 ft (224 m)

Population (2020)
  - Total: 2,657
  - Density: 147.9/sq mi (57.12/km^{2})
- Time zone: UTC-5 (Eastern (EST))
  - Summer (DST): UTC-4 (EDT)
- ZIP code(s): 49706 (Alanson); 49722 (Conway); 49740 (Harbor Springs)
- Area code: 231
- FIPS code: 26-48080
- GNIS feature ID: 1626631
- Website: https://www.littletraversetownship.org/

Little Traverse Township is a civil township of Emmet County in the U.S. state of Michigan. The population was 2,657 at the 2020 census.

== Communities ==
- Conway is an unincorporated community and census-designated place in the township, on the west end of Crooked Lake on U.S. Highway 31 at 45°25′00″N 84°52′01″W. The community is served by a box-only post office with the ZIP Code 49722.
- Wequetonsing is an unincorporated community in the township, just east of Harbor Springs on M-119 at 45°25′41″N 84°58′03″W.

== Geography ==
According to the United States Census Bureau, the township has a total area of 20.36 square miles (52.7 km^{2}), of which 17.96 square miles (46.5 km^{2}) is land and 2.40 square miles (6.2 km^{2}) (11.79%) is water.

== Demographics ==
As of the census of 2000, there were 2,426 people, 978 households, and 707 families residing in the township. The population density was 134.7 inhabitants per square mile (52.0/km^{2}). There were 1,555 housing units at an average density of 86.3 per square mile (33.3/km^{2}). The racial makeup of the township was 96.50% White, 0.12% African American, 1.85% Native American, 0.54% Asian, 0.04% Pacific Islander, 0.12% from other races, and 0.82% from two or more races. Hispanic or Latino of any race were 0.82% of the population.

There were 978 households, of which 33.0% included children under the age of 18, 60.6% were married couples living together, 8.2% had a female householder with no husband present, and 27.7% were non-families. Individuals made up 22.7% of all households, including 6.4% of households containing one person aged 65 years or older, living alone. The average household size was 2.47 and the average family size was 2.89.

In the township, the population’s age distribution was 25.6% under 18 years old, 5.4% from 18 to 24, 28.2% from 25 to 44, 27.6% from 45 to 64, and 13.2% who were 65 years old or more. The median age was 40 years. For every 100 females, there were 97.2 males. For every 100 females age 18 and over, there were 94.1 males.

The median income for a household in the township was $41,228, and the median income for a family was $47,788. Males had a median income about 55% higher than females, $36,066 versus $23,250. The per capita income for the township was $20,830. About 4.3% of families and 6.1% of the population were below the poverty line, including 8.4% of those under age 18 and 3.8% of those age 65 or over.
