= Harbor Springs, Michigan =

- City
- City of Harbor Springs
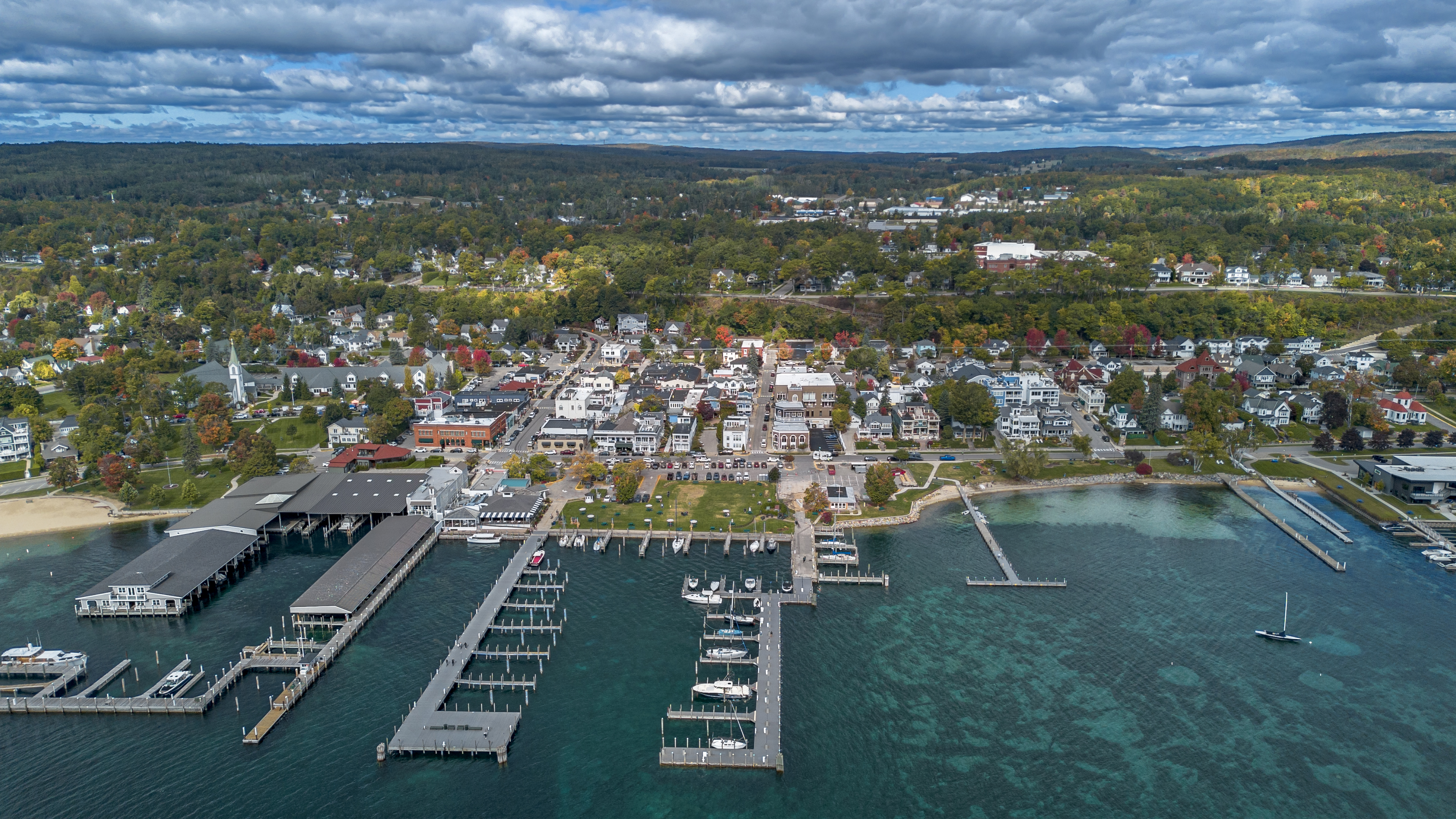
- Aerial view of downtown Harbor Springs

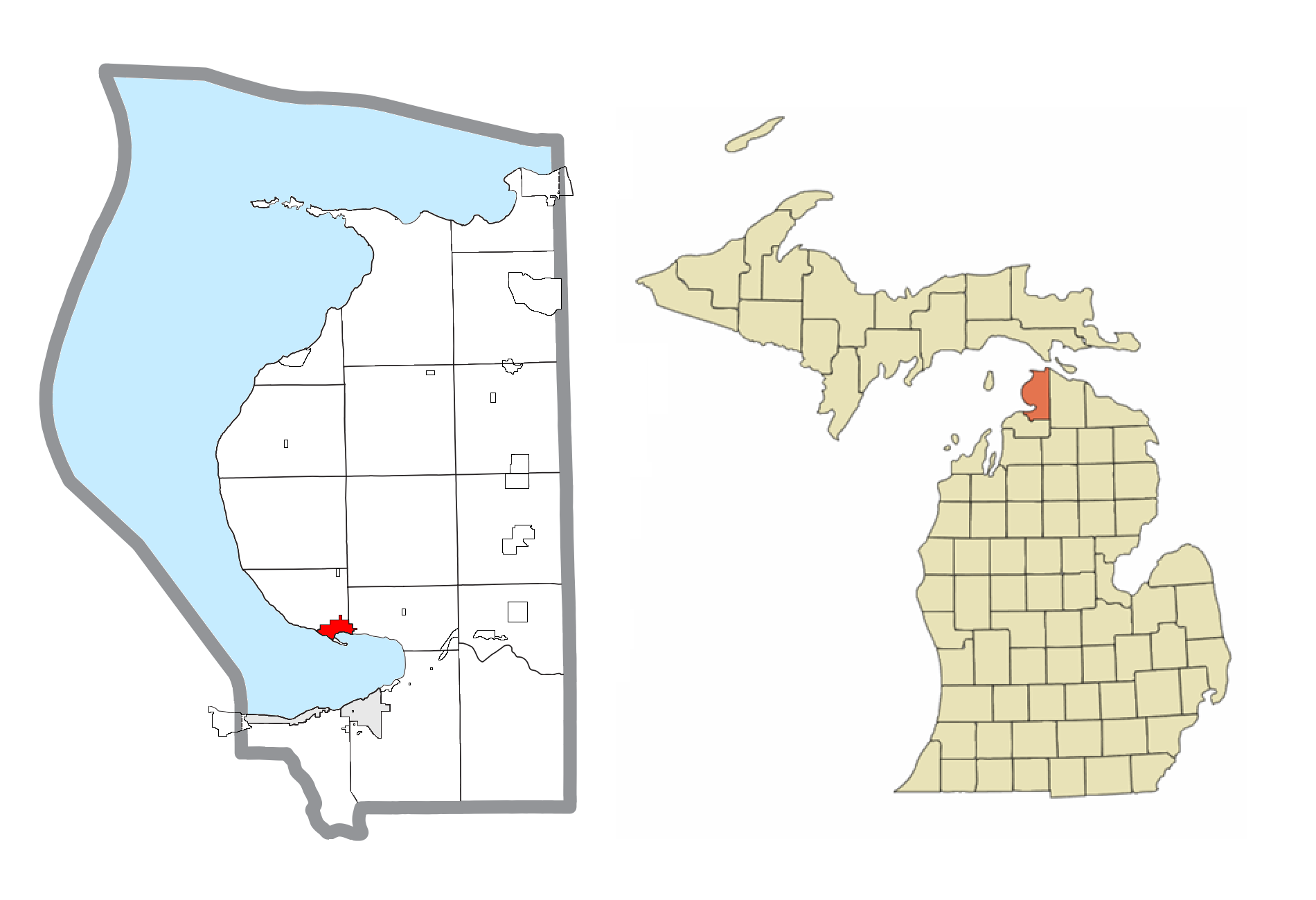
- Location within Emmet County

- Location within the state of Michigan Location within the United States
- Coordinates: 45°25′54″N 84°59′31″W
- Country: United States
- State: Michigan
- County: Emmet
- Incorporated: 1881

Government
  - Type: Mayor–council
  - Mayor: Jamie Melke
  - Manager: Chris Kukulski

Area
  - Total: 1.30 sq mi (3.37 km^{2})
  - Land: 1.30 sq mi (3.37 km^{2})
  - Water: 0 sq mi (0.00 km^{2})
- Elevation: 669 ft (204 m)

Population (2020)
  - Total: 1,274
  - Density: 977.9/sq mi (377.57/km^{2})
- Time zone: UTC-5 (EST)
  - Summer (DST): UTC-4 (EDT)
- ZIP code(s): 49740
- Area code: 231
- FIPS code: 26-36560
- GNIS feature ID: 0627758
- Website: www.cityofharborsprings.com

Harbor Springs is a city and resort community in Emmet County, Michigan, United States. The population was 1,274 in the 2020 census.

Harbor Springs is in a sheltered bay on the north shore of the Little Traverse Bay on Lake Michigan. The Little Traverse Lighthouse is a historic lighthouse on the Harbor Point peninsula, which shelters the deepest natural harbor on the Great Lakes. M-119 connects with US 31 7 miles (11 km) east and south at Bay View and Petoskey, which is 4 miles (6.4 km) away on the south side of the harbor.

The area is known for its historic summer resorts, such as Wequetonsing, which was founded by Illinois businessmen and lawyers Henry Stryker III, and Henry Brigham McClure. They were both connected with the Jacob Bunn industrial dynasty of Illinois.

== History ==
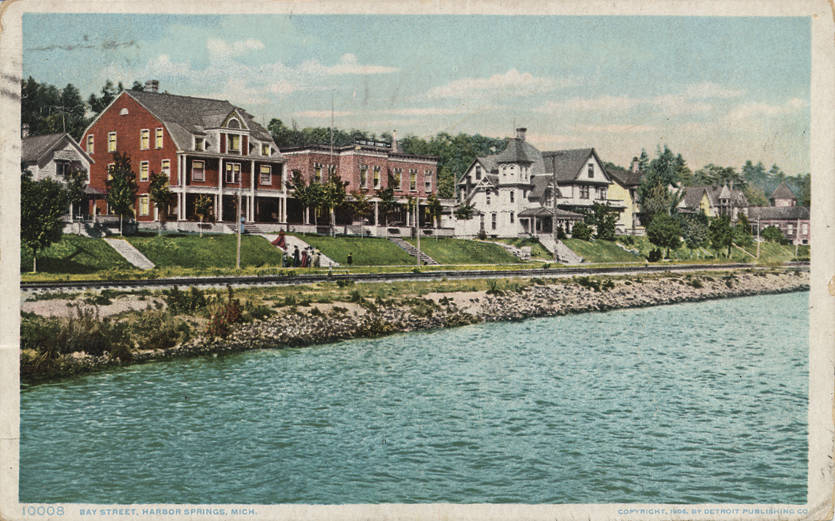
Bay Street in Harbor Springs, circa 1900s

The European-American settlement started with a mission by French Catholic Jesuits; they called this area L'Arbre Croche, meaning Crooked Tree. In 1847, L'Arbre Croche had the largest concentration of Native Americans in Michigan. French traders renamed the area Petit Traverse, or Little Crossing, when they arrived in the area. After more settlers came from the eastern United States, they changed the name of the village from Little Traverse to Harbor Springs upon its incorporation in 1881.

The federally recognized Little Traverse Bay Bands of Odawa Indians are descendants of the numerous Odawa bands that occupied this area. They have their tribal offices in Harbor Springs and a gaming resort in Petoskey.

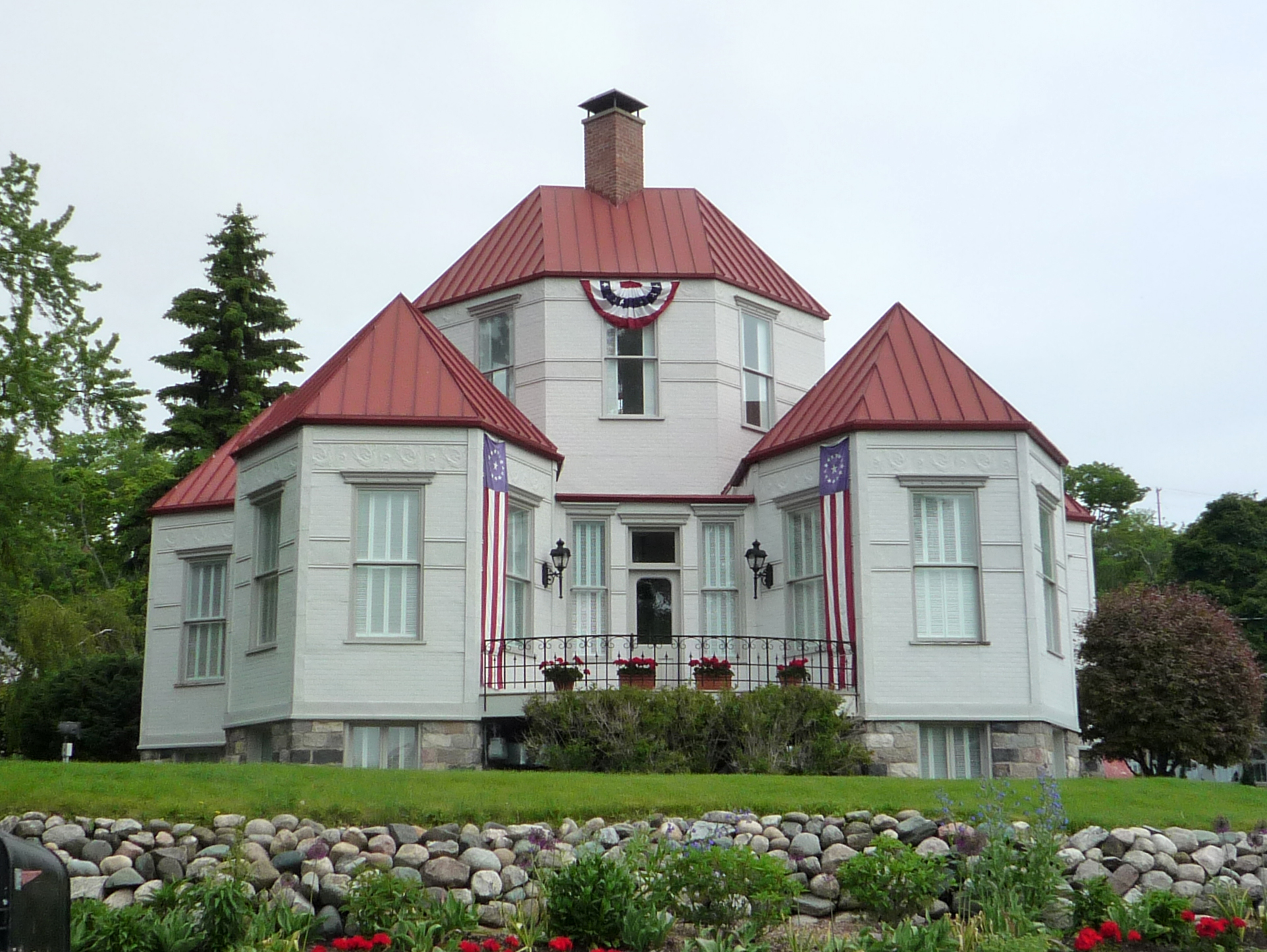
Ephraim Shay's hexagonally shaped house.

Ephraim Shay (1839–1916) is known for his invention of the Shay locomotive. The hexagonal-shaped house he built in downtown Harbor Springs is listed on the National Register of Historic Places. The local elementary school is named after him.

The Douglas House on the shore of Lake Michigan was designed by architect Richard Meier and completed in 1973. This house is one of 150 structures listed in 2007 as America's Favorite Architecture by the American Institute of Architects.

The Club Ponytail was a music hall destroyed by fire in 1969.

== Geography ==
According to the United States Census Bureau, the city has a total area of 1.30 square miles (3.37 km^{2}), all of it land.

=== Climate ===
The climate is described as Humid Continental by the Köppen Climate System, abbreviated as Dfb.

== Demographics ==
Historical population
Census	Pop.	Note	%±
1880	164		—
1890	1,052		541.5%
1900	1,643		56.2%
1910	1,805		9.9%
1920	1,600		−11.4%
1930	1,429		−10.7%
1940	1,423		−0.4%
1950	1,626		14.3%
1960	1,433		−11.9%
1970	1,662		16.0%
1980	1,567		−5.7%
1990	1,540		−1.7%
2000	1,567		1.8%
2010	1,194		−23.8%
2020	1,274		6.7%
U.S. Decennial Census

=== 2010 census ===
As of the census of 2010, there were 1,194 people, 558 households, and 294 families residing in the city. The population density was 918.5 inhabitants per square mile (354.6/km^{2}). There were 1,122 housing units at an average density of 863.1 per square mile (333.2/km^{2}). The racial makeup of the city was 92.0% white, 0.3% African American, 4.8% Native American, 0.8% Asian, 0.1% Pacific Islander, 0.1% from other races, and 2.0% from two or more races. Hispanic or Latino of any race were 0.7% of the population.

There were 558 households, of which 19.4% included children under the age of 18, 38.4% were married couples living together, 10.0% had a female householder with no husband present, 4.3% had a male householder with no wife present, and 47.3% were non-families. 43.7% of all households were made up of individuals, and 23.1% had someone living alone who was 65 years of age or older. The average household size was 1.93 and the average family size was 2.66.

The median age in the city was 55.8 years. 15.7% of residents were under the age of 18; 4.9% were between the ages of 18 and 24; 14.7% were from 25 to 44; 32.6% were from 45 to 64; and 32.2% were 65 years of age or older. The gender makeup of the city was 43.8% male and 56.2% female.

=== 2000 census ===
Largest ancestries (2000)	Percent
German	17.4%
English	16.2%
Irish	14.1%
French	7.4%
Polish	6.7%
American	6.2%
Odawa	4.34%

As of the census of 2000, there were 1,567 people, 683 households, and 383 families residing in the city. The population density was 1,208.9 inhabitants per square mile (466.8/km^{2}). There were 1,086 housing units at an average density of 837.8 per square mile (323.5/km^{2}). The racial makeup of the city was 91.70% White, 0.19% African American, 5.87% Native American, 0.19% Asian, and 2.04% from two or more races. Hispanic or Latino of any race were 0.57% of the population.

There were 683 households, out of which 23.0% had children under the age of 18 living with them, 46.0% were married couples living together, 7.8% had a female householder with no husband present, and 43.8% were non-families. 39.4% of all households were made up of individuals, and 18.0% had someone living alone who was 65 years of age or older. The average household size was 2.14 and the average family size was 2.88.

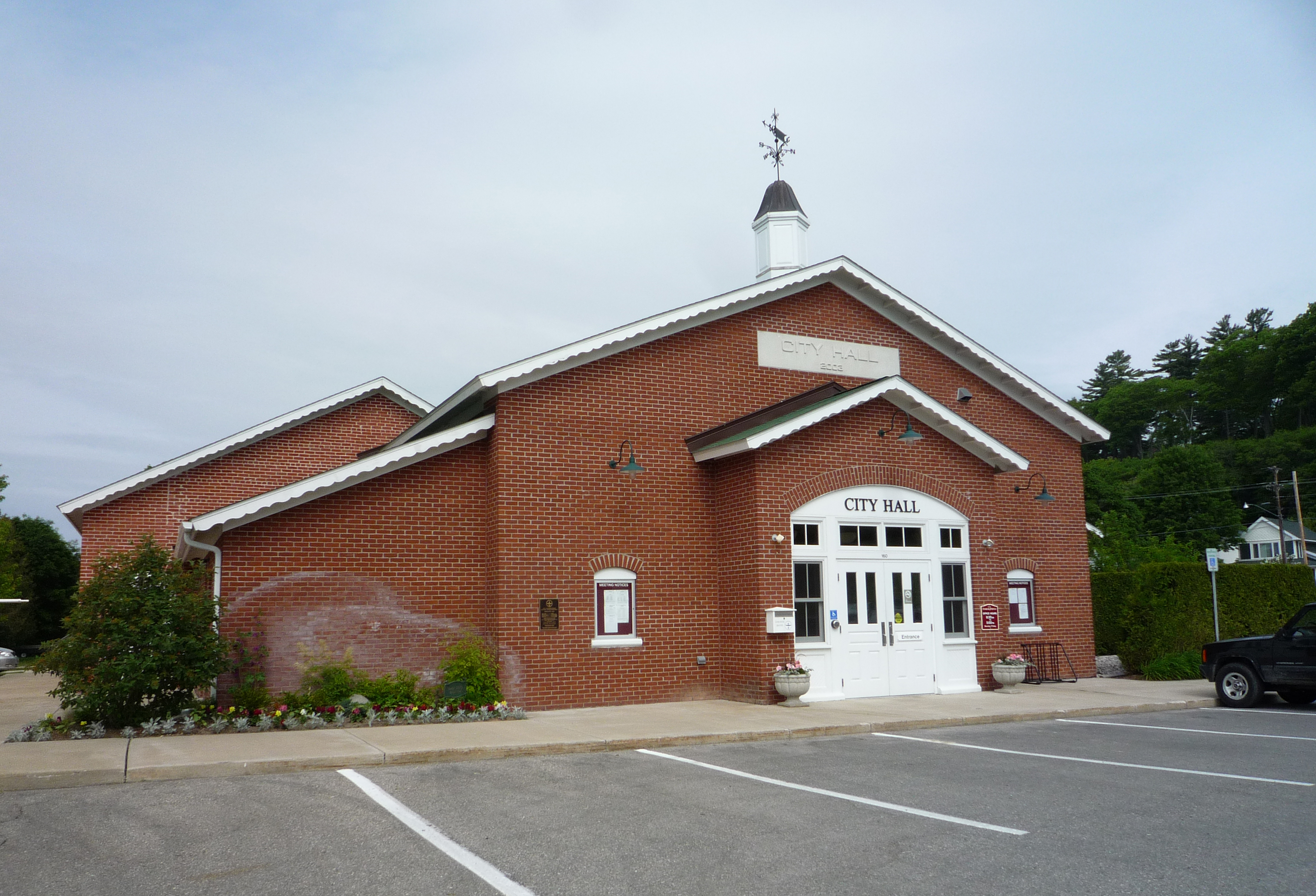
City Hall

In the city, the population was spread out, with 20.4% under the age of 18, 4.6% from 18 to 24, 22.8% from 25 to 44, 28.3% from 45 to 64, and 23.8% who were 65 years of age or older. The median age was 47 years. For every 100 females, there were 81.6 males. For every 100 females age 18 and over, there were 74.4 males.

The median income for a household in the city was $35,341, and the median income for a family was $46,750. Males had a median income of $29,236 versus $27,167 for females. The per capita income for the city was $21,876. About 5.3% of families and 6.8% of the population were below the poverty line, including 6.5% of those under age 18 and 9.8% of those age 65 or over.

== Transportation ==
=== Airports ===
- The nearest airports with scheduled passenger service are in Pellston Regional Airport and Traverse City Cherry Capital Airport.
- Harbor Springs Municipal Airport is a public general aviation with no scheduled commercial flights.

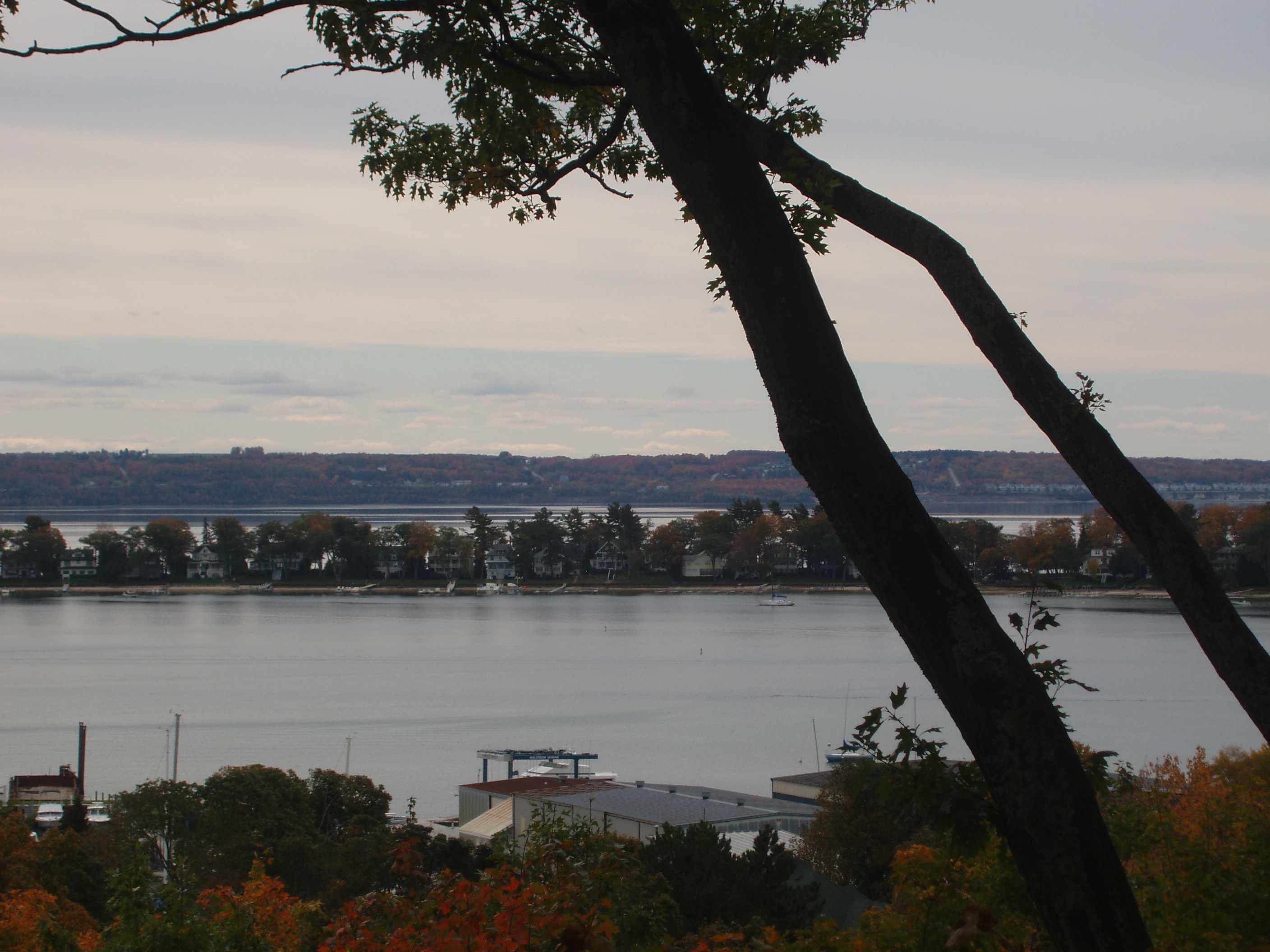
Panorama from the bluff overlooking the city

=== Highways ===
- M-119 follows an east–west route within the city of Harbor Springs. West of the city, the highway continues northerly up the shore of Lake Michigan and through the Tunnel of Trees to a terminus at Cross Village. East of the city, the highway continues along the shore of Little Traverse Bay before terminating at US Highway 31 (US 31), which can be used to access Petoskey.
- C-77 is a north–south route beginning at Harbor Springs and continuing north to Cross Village.
- C-81 is a north–south route running from just east of the city northerly toward Mackinaw City.

== Notable people ==
- Andrew Blackbird, Odawa (Ottawa) tribe leader and historian
- Jocko Cunningham, racing driver
- Robert Klark Graham, inventor, eugenicist, businessman. Founder of the Repository for Germinal Choice and recipient of the Ig Nobel Prize
- F. James McDonald, former president and chief operating officer of General Motors.
- Joe Dart, musician
- Hord Hardin, chairman of the Augusta National Golf Club, 1980-1991.

== Images ==
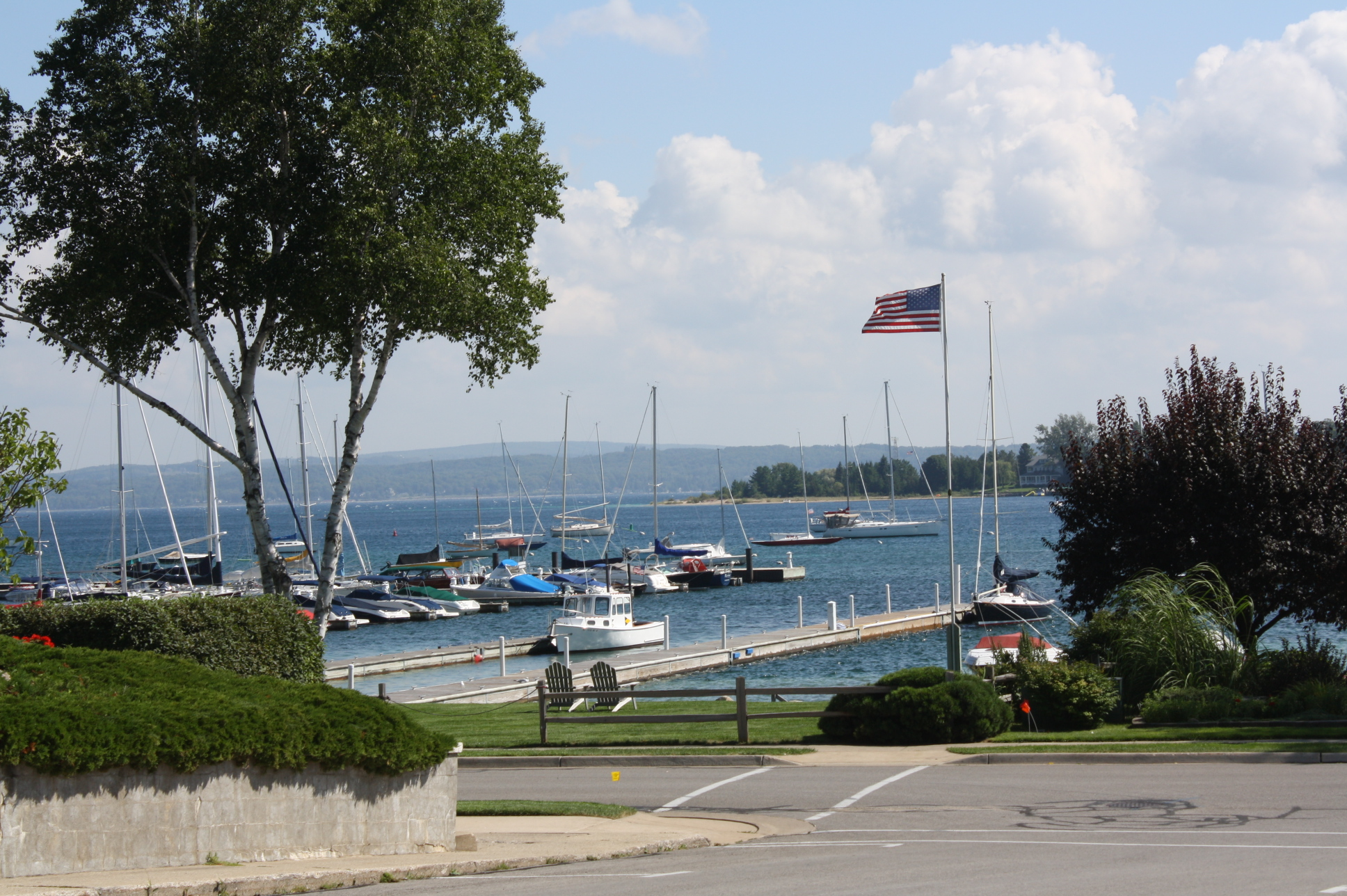
Harbor

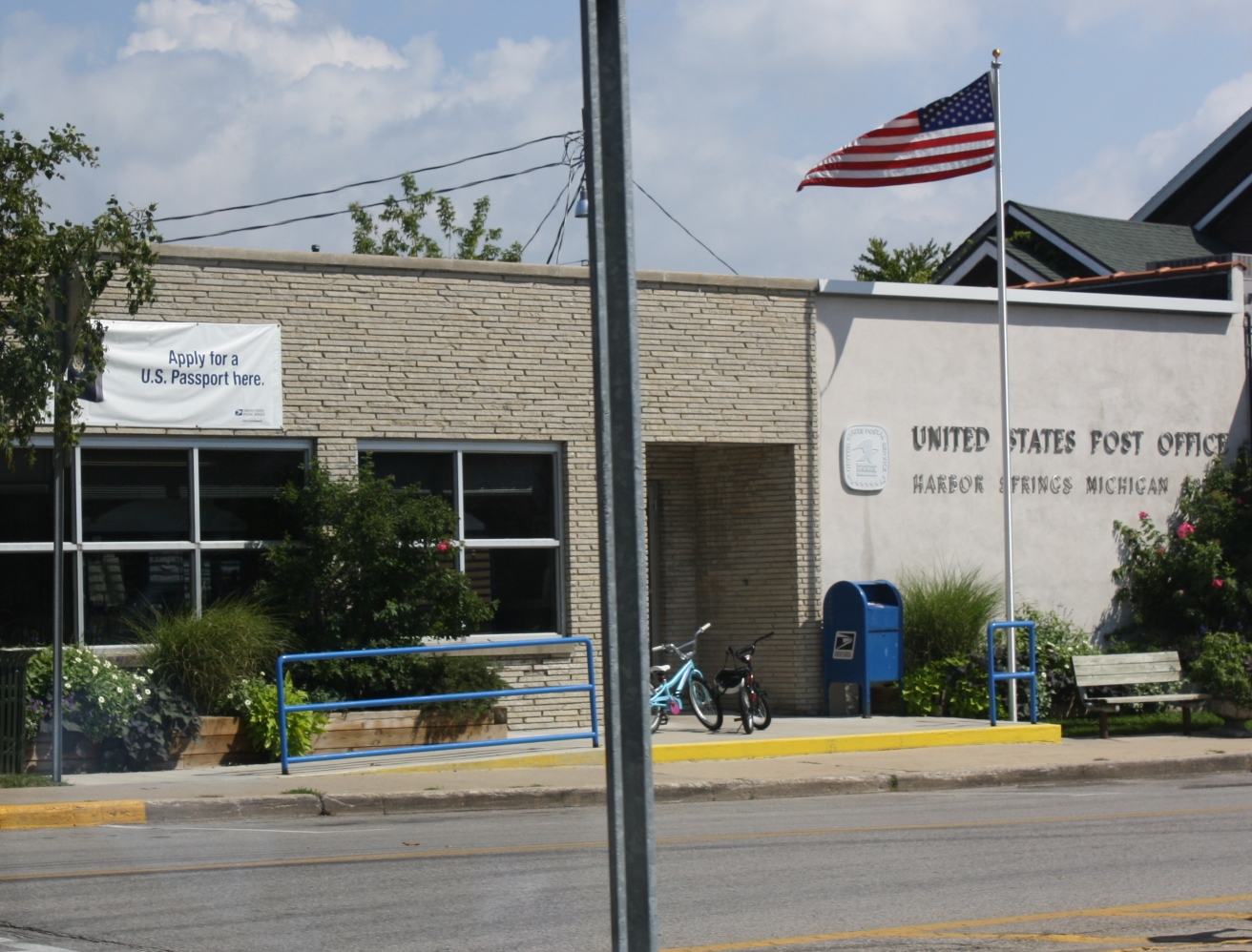
Post office

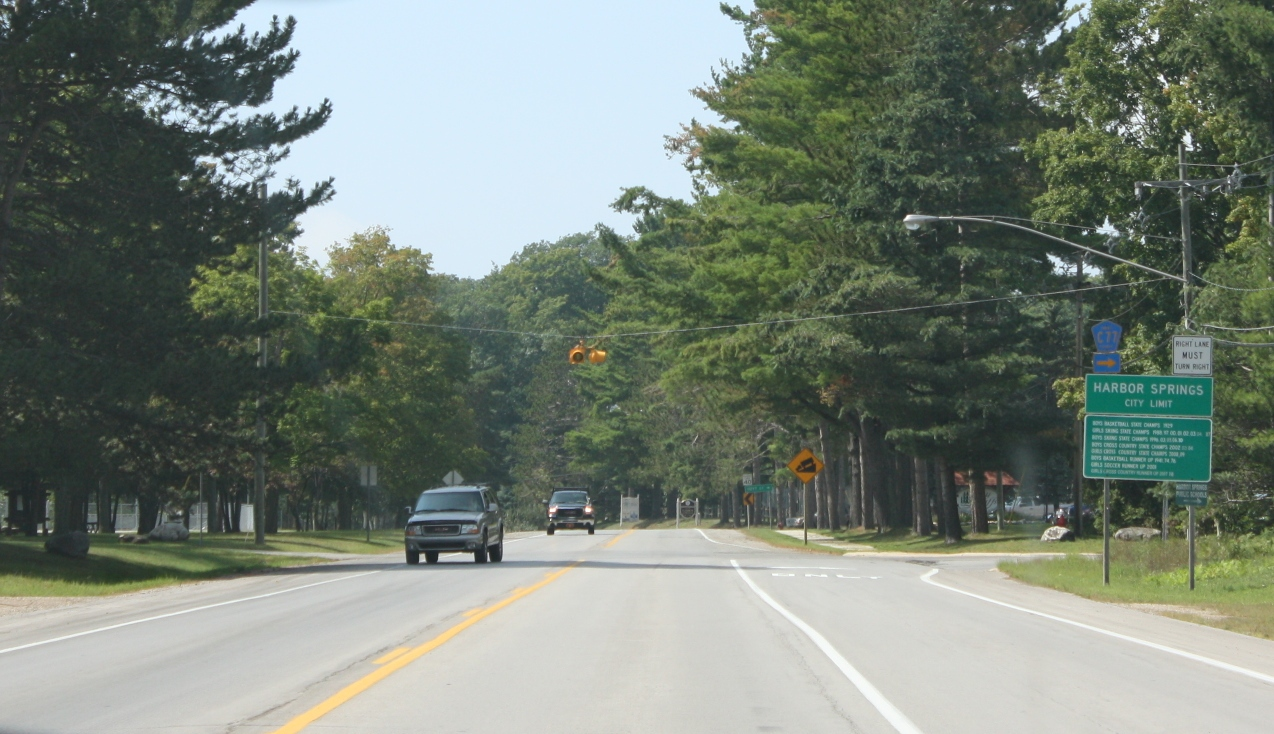
Sign on M-119

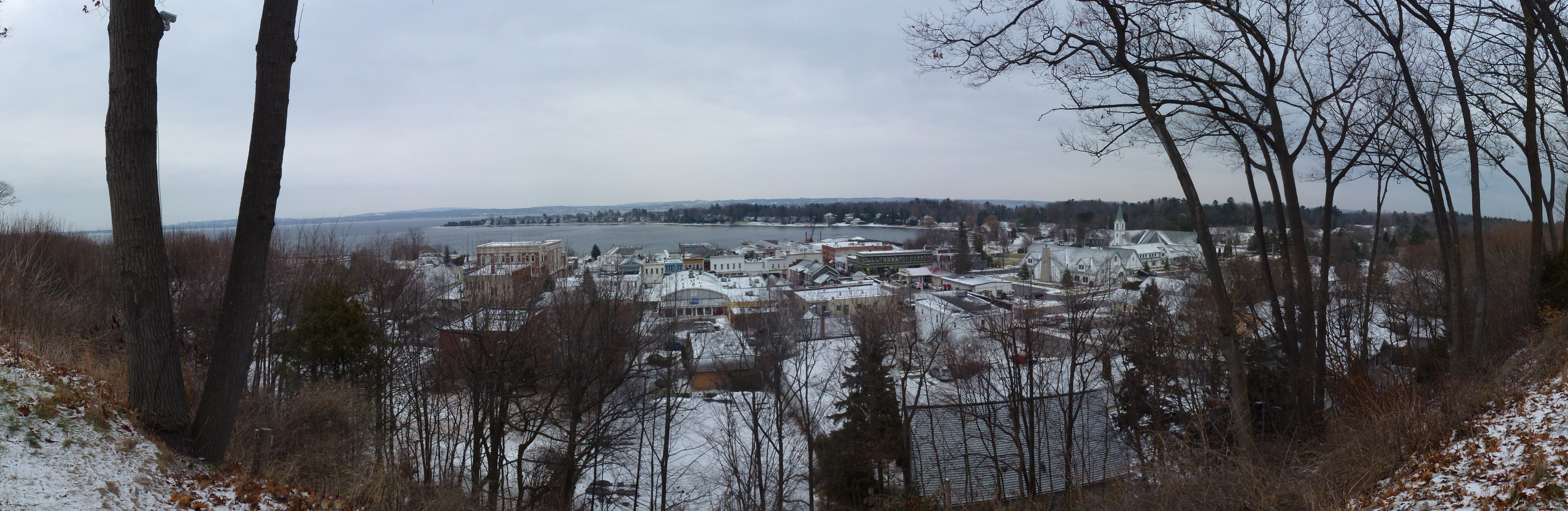
View of downtown from the bluff
