= National Register of Historic Places listings in Emmet County, Michigan =

Location of Emmet County in Michigan

This is a list of the National Register of Historic Places listings in Emmet County, Michigan.

This is intended to be a complete list of the properties and districts on the National Register of Historic Places in Emmet County, Michigan, United States. Latitude and longitude coordinates are provided for many National Register properties and districts; these locations may be seen together in a map.

There are 52 properties and districts listed on the National Register in the county, including three National Historic Landmarks.

This National Park Service list is complete through NPS recent listings posted September 26, 2025.

== Current listings ==
	Name on the Register	Image	Date listed	Location	City or town	Description
1	J. B. Allen House	J. B. Allen House	September 10, 1986 (#86001973)	822 Grove St. 45°22′14″N 84°56′51″W	Petoskey	
2	Isaac Bartram House	Isaac Bartram House	September 10, 1986 (#86001975)	508 Wachtel Ave. 45°22′23″N 84°57′46″W	Petoskey	
3	Bay View	Bay View	March 16, 1972 (#72000613)	Northeast of Petoskey on US 31; 45°22′57″N 84°55′56″W	Petoskey	Established in 1876 as a Methodist camp meeting, this romantically-planned campground was converted to an independent chautauqua in 1885, a role it served until 1915. These two uniquely American community forms are exemplified in this extensive and well-preserved complex.
4	Chief Andrew J. Blackbird House	Chief Andrew J. Blackbird House	April 14, 1972 (#72000611)	368 E. Main St. 45°25′49″N 84°59′05″W	Harbor Springs	The Chief Andrew J. Blackbird House, also known as the Andrew J. Blackbird Museum, was built as the home of Chief Andrew Blackbird, an Odawa (Ottawa) tribe leader, historian, and proponent of Indian civil rights. The house currently operates as a museum of American Indian artifacts.
5	W. S. Carmichael House	W. S. Carmichael House	September 10, 1986 (#86001977)	301 Jackson St. 45°22′16″N 84°57′50″W	Petoskey	
6	Chesapeake & Ohio Railway Station	Chesapeake & Ohio Railway Station	October 15, 1970 (#70000270)	Pioneer Park, W. Lake St. 45°22′31″N 84°57′33″W	Petoskey	Also known as the Chicago & West Michigan Railway Station; now used as the Little Traverse History Museum
7	I. N. Debenham House	I. N. Debenham House	September 10, 1986 (#86001979)	1101 Emmet St. 45°22′00″N 84°57′31″W	Petoskey	
8	James and Jean Douglas House		May 3, 2016 (#16000232)	3490 S. Lake Shore Dr. 45°30′04″N 85°05′51″W	Friendship Township	Designed by renowned architect Richard Meier, this Modern house sits on a steep lot overlooking Lake Michigan.
9	East Mitchell Street Historic District		November 12, 1986 (#86001983)	Roughly bounded by Rose, Kalamazoo, State, Howard, Michigan, and Division; 45°22′24″N 84°56′59″W	Petoskey	The East Mitchell Street Historic District is a residential districts occupying 31 blocks. It contains 294 residential properties, predominantly frame structures, 1 1/2 to 2 1/2 stories high. Architectural styles include Victorian, Queen Anne, Shingle style, Colonial Revival, Radford-type, Bungalow, and other period designs, dating from the late 1800s through the 1930s.
10	Gerhard Fochtman House	Gerhard Fochtman House	September 10, 1986 (#86001998)	1004 Waukazoo Ave. 45°22′07″N 84°57′12″W	Petoskey	
11	Fort Michilimackinac	Fort Michilimackinac	October 15, 1966 (#66000395)	Near Mackinac Bridge at the southern end of the Mackinac Bridge; 45°47′12″N 84°43′58″W	Mackinaw City	Fort Michilimackinac was an 18th-century French, and later British, fort and trading post. Built around 1715 and abandoned in 1783, it is preserved as an open-air historical museum, with several reconstructed wooden buildings and palisade.
12	Fourth Ward Polling Place		September 10, 1986 (#86002001)	209 Washington St. 45°22′06″N 84°57′29″W	Petoskey	Does not exist
13	Meyer Fryman House	Meyer Fryman House	September 10, 1986 (#86002002)	211 Michigan St. 45°22′23″N 84°57′29″W	Petoskey	
14	Grace Methodist Episcopal Church	Grace Methodist Episcopal Church	September 10, 1986 (#86002012)	625 Connable St. 45°22′15″N 84°58′08″W	Petoskey	The Grace Methodist Episcopal Church, constructed between 1903 and 1908, is a single-story frame church building with a gabled roof.
15	Grand Rapids and Indiana Railroad Harbor Springs Depot	Grand Rapids and Indiana Railroad Harbor Springs Depot	December 7, 2000 (#00001487)	111 W. Bay St. 45°25′43″N 84°59′22″W	Harbor Springs	
16	Grays Reef Light Station	Grays Reef Light Station	November 9, 2005 (#05001210)	In northeastern Lake Michigan, 3.8 mi (6.1 km) west of Waugashance Island; 45°46′00″N 85°09′12″W	Bliss Township	The Grays Reef Light was constructed in 1936 to warn ships away from the shoals at Waugoshance Point.
17	Ernest Hemingway Cottage	Ernest Hemingway Cottage	November 24, 1968 (#68000026)	6502 Lake Grove Rd. 45°16′50″N 85°00′04″W	Petoskey	Boyhood summer home of author Ernest Hemingway. His father built the house in 1900 when Hemingway was a year old and it was here the future writer learned to hunt and fish and appreciate the outdoor life he came to celebrate in his writings.
18	Bert and John Hobbins House	Bert and John Hobbins House	September 10, 1986 (#86002013)	1024 Emmet St. 45°22′03″N 84°57′33″W	Petoskey	
19	Hosman and Wheeler Meat Market	Hosman and Wheeler Meat Market	September 10, 1986 (#86002015)	621 Ingalls Ave. 45°22′14″N 84°57′56″W	Petoskey	
20	John Kabler House	John Kabler House	September 10, 1986 (#86002017)	415 Jackson St. 45°22′17″N 84°58′01″W	Petoskey	
21	Frank Lesher House	Frank Lesher House	September 10, 1986 (#86002018)	122 Sheridan St. 45°21′54″N 84°57′36″W	Petoskey	
22	A. Malin House	A. Malin House	September 10, 1986 (#86002020)	54 Bridge St. 45°22′07″N 84°57′46″W	Petoskey	
23	George and Eugene Markle House	George and Eugene Markle House	September 10, 1986 (#86002023)	701 Kalamazoo St. 45°22′14″N 84°56′43″W	Petoskey	
24	George McManus House	George McManus House	September 10, 1986 (#86002026)	121 State St. 45°22′19″N 84°57′33″W	Petoskey	
25	Elias Meyers House	Elias Meyers House	September 10, 1986 (#86002030)	912 Baxter St. 45°22′08″N 84°57′39″W	Petoskey	
26	Jacob Miller House	Jacob Miller House	September 10, 1986 (#86002031)	307 Jackson St. 45°22′16″N 84°57′51″W	Petoskey	
27	Mineral Well Park	Mineral Well Park	March 25, 1987 (#86002036)	W. Lake St. 45°22′31″N 84°57′37″W	Petoskey	
28	John Nyman House	John Nyman House	September 10, 1986 (#86002039)	915 Emmet St. 45°22′07″N 84°57′31″W	Petoskey	
29	G. W. Olin House	G. W. Olin House	September 10, 1986 (#86002042)	610 Kalamazoo St. 45°22′17″N 84°56′44″W	Petoskey	
30	Sarah Pennington House	Sarah Pennington House	September 10, 1986 (#86002045)	719 Maple St. 45°22′09″N 84°58′07″W	Petoskey	
31	Petoskey Downtown Historic District	Petoskey Downtown Historic District	November 12, 1986 (#86002048)	Roughly bounded by Rose, Division, Michigan, and Petoskey; 45°22′30″N 84°57′19″W	Petoskey	The Petoskey Downtown Historic District consists of 102 commercial properties and two institutional structures, located along 10 blocks in Petoskey's business district, primarily along East Mitchell and Howard streets. The contributing structures range in date from 1879 to the 1920s.
32	Petoskey Grocery Company Building	Petoskey Grocery Company Building	September 10, 1986 (#86002051)	616 Petoskey St. 45°22′16″N 84°57′27″W	Petoskey	Also known as the George T. Zipp Lumber Company Building, this commercial building is a three-story brick Queen Anne commercial structure built on a trapezoidal plan. It is now the Emmet County Professional Office Building.
33	Petoskey Public Works Utility Building	Petoskey Public Works Utility Building	September 13, 1986 (#86002056)	106 W. Lake St. 45°22′31″N 84°57′39″W	Petoskey	The Petoskey Public Works Utility Building is a two-story concrete Moderne structure. The exterior walls are grooved, referencing the fluting seen in classical piers.
34	Ponshewaing Point Site		May 5, 1972 (#72001473)	Ponshewaing Point; 45°25′00″N 84°48′00″W	Ponshewaing	The Ponshewaing Point Site (designated 20EM18) is an archaeological site located on Ponshewaing Point in Crooked Lake. The site was in use from approximately AD 800 - 1500, covering several Middle and Late Woodland period occupations.
35	Phillip Rehkopf House	Phillip Rehkopf House	September 10, 1986 (#86002069)	918 Howard St. 45°22′06″N 84°57′21″W	Petoskey	
36	Saint Ignatius Church and Cemetery	Saint Ignatius Church and Cemetery	January 31, 2007 (#06001328)	101 N. Lamkin Rd. 45°33′06″N 85°06′56″W	Readmond Township	The area around this church has been an Odawa village (formerly known as Wa-Ga-Nak-A-Sa or Middle Village) since at least the 1700s. In 1741, a Roman Catholic chapel was established at this location in a bark longhouse. The first structure was replaced by a more substantial version, dedicated by Father Frederic Baraga, in 1833. That church was destroyed by fire on Easter Sunday, April 21, 1889, and this church was constructed to replace it. Adjacent to the church is the Middle Village Cemetery, which contains rows of white crosses marking gravesites.
37	George Schantz House and Store	George Schantz House and Store	September 10, 1986 (#86002072)	534 Wachtel Ave. 45°22′19″N 84°57′47″W	Petoskey	
38	Frank Schapler House	Frank Schapler House	September 10, 1986 (#86002074)	106 E. Lake St. 45°22′30″N 84°57′39″W	Petoskey	
39	Seventh Day Adventist Church	Seventh Day Adventist Church	September 10, 1986 (#86002077)	224 Michigan St. 45°22′21″N 84°57′26″W	Petoskey	The old Seventh Day Adventist Church is a two-story frame Queen Anne structure with a front-gable roof and an entrance tower at one end topped with an onion-like dome. It was originally built in 1891 as a Seventh-day Adventist church, and was later sold to the Church of Jesus Christ of Latter-day Saints.
40	Shafer's Grocery and Residence	Shafer's Grocery and Residence	September 10, 1986 (#86002079)	1018 Emmet St. 45°22′04″N 84°57′33″W	Petoskey	Shafer's Grocery and Residence consists of two attached structures: a single-story frame commercial store, and an attached two-story gabled residence with a front porch running the full width of the house.
41	Shay Complex	Shay Complex	November 7, 1972 (#72000612)	Main and Judd Sts. 45°25′49″N 84°59′02″W	Harbor Springs	Originally a complex of three buildings constructed by Ephraim Shay, only one structure, the house, remains. It is unique in its hexagon shape and all-metal construction.
42	Skillagalee Light Station	Skillagalee Light Station	July 19, 1984 (#84001389)	Southwest of Waugoshance Island; 45°40′35″N 85°10′18″W	Cross Village	More commonly known as the Ile Aux Galets Light, the Skillagalee Light warns shipping away from the shoals at Waugoshance Point. A light was first constructed here in 1851; the current structure dates from 1888.
43	St. Francis Solanus Mission	St. Francis Solanus Mission	March 16, 1972 (#72000614)	475 W. Lake St. 45°22′32″N 84°58′03″W	Petoskey	St. Francis Solanus Mission is a historic mission on W. Lake Street in Petoskey. It is the only existing building in the Arbre Croche district dating from the time of Bishop Frederic Baraga, and is the oldest building still standing in Petoskey, as well as one of the oldest in northern lower Michigan.
44	Stout House	Stout House	September 10, 1986 (#86002080)	606 Grove St. 45°22′14″N 84°57′05″W	Petoskey	
45	Trinity Evangelical Church	Trinity Evangelical Church	September 10, 1986 (#86002082)	219 State Street; 45°22′14″N 84°57′21″W	Petoskey	The Trinity Evangelical Church is a 2 1/2-story Classical Revival brick structure with a single-story polygonal entrance and a gable roof. The Trinity Evangelical congregation constructed this church in 1929. In 2013, the building was sold to New Life Anglican Church.
46	Jacob VanZolenburg House	Jacob VanZolenburg House	September 10, 1986 (#86002083)	203 State St. 45°22′20″N 84°57′32″W	Petoskey	
47	Waugoshance Light Station	Waugoshance Light Station	August 4, 1983 (#83000841)	Northwest of Waugoshance Island; 45°46′30″N 85°05′19″W	Waugoshance Island	The Waugoshance Light was constructed in 1851 to warn ships away from the shoals at Waugoshance Point. The light was deactivated in 1912, and has been abandoned since.
48	J. M. Wells House	J. M. Wells House	September 10, 1986 (#86002084)	203 W. Lake St. 45°22′29″N 84°57′45″W	Petoskey	
49	West Mitchell Street Bridge	West Mitchell Street Bridge	September 10, 1986 (#86002085)	W. Mitchell St. at Bear River; 45°22′26″N 84°57′39″W	Petoskey	The West Mitchell Street Bridge is a seven-span Moderne highway bridge, constructed of reinforced concrete, with broad ogee arches supporting each span.
50	White Shoal Light Station	White Shoal Light Station	July 19, 1984 (#84001391)	Northwest of Waugashance Island; 45°50′32″N 85°08′07″W	Mackinaw City	The White Shoal Light was constructed in 1912 to warn ships away from the shoals at Waugoshance Point.
51	Wycamp Creek Site		March 11, 1971 (#71001022)	Address Restricted; 45°39′08″N 85°00′10″W	Levering	The Wycamp Creek Site (designated 20EM4) is an archaeological site located in a small dune field near Lake Michigan, on a Nipissing terrace near Wycamp Creek. It is likely this site was occupied more or less continuously throughout the Late Middle and Late Woodland period.
52	Zion Evangelical Lutheran Church	Zion Evangelical Lutheran Church	September 10, 1986 (#86002086)	812 Petoskey St. 45°22′11″N 84°57′27″W	Petoskey	The Zion Evangelical Lutheran Church is a one-story Late Victorian frame structure. It was erected 1892 for the Zion Evangelical Church congregation, who used the church until 1949. In 1951, the Petoskey Mennonite Church purchased the building; they used the building until 2015. As of 2017, the building is used by the Unitarian Universalist Congregation of Petoskey as their "Chapel of Our Guardian Angels."

== See also ==
- List of Michigan State Historic Sites in Emmet County, Michigan
- List of National Historic Landmarks in Michigan
- National Register of Historic Places listings in Michigan
- Listings in neighboring counties: Charlevoix, Cheboygan, Mackinac
