= Petoskey =

Petoskey may refer to a number of articles relating to the U.S. state of Michigan:

- Petoskey, Michigan, a city in Emmet County, in the Northern Lower Peninsula
  - Petosegay, an Odawa chief
  - Petoskey Downtown Historic District
  - Petoskey Grocery Company Building
  - Petoskey High School
  - Petoskey Motor Speedway
  - Petoskey News-Review
  - Petoskey Public Works Utility Building
  - Petoskey State Park
  - Petoskey station
- Petoskey stone, a fossilized coral that is the state stone of Michigan
