= List of Michigan State Historic Sites in Emmet County =

Location of Emmet County in Michigan

The following is a list of Michigan State Historic Sites in Emmet County, Michigan. Sites marked with a dagger (†) are also listed on the National Register of Historic Places in Emmet County, Michigan. Those with a double dagger (‡) are also designated National Historic Landmarks.

== Current listings ==
Name	Image	Location	City	Listing date
Bay View Association‡		Bay View	Bay View	June 5, 1957
Andrew J. Blackbird House†		368 East Main Street	Harbor Springs	October 29, 1971
Guy Brown Cottage	Windswept-Guy Brown Cottage	816 Lakeside Drive	Mackinaw City	August 3, 1979
Chicago & West Michigan Railway Station†, also known as the Chesapeake & Ohio Railway Station; now the Little Traverse History Museum		100 Depot Court	Petoskey	July 17, 1970
Evangelical United Brethren Church		1428 W. Sturgeon Bay Trail	Bliss Township	February 27, 1980
W. W. Fairbairn Informational Designation		7537 Burr Ave	Alanson	2004
Fort Michilimackinac‡		Straits Avenue	Mackinaw City	February 18, 1956
Fort Michilimackinac State Park		Straits Avenue	Mackinaw City	2009
Gardner House	Gardner House	307 Bay St.	Harbor Springs	October 17, 1974
Grand Rapids & Indiana Railroad Depot†	Chicago & West Michigan Railway Station	111 West Bay Street	Harbor Springs	2006
Harbor Point Association	Private association at Harbor Point, Harbor Springs	Harbor Point	Harbor Point	October 17, 1974
Ernest Hemingway Cottage‡	Windemere-Lakeside1	6502 Lake Grove Rd.	Petoskey	February 21, 1975
Hollywood Sunoco Service	Hollywood Sunoco Station	201 State St	Harbor Springs	October 17, 1974
Holy Childhood of Jesus School (demolished)		School campus grounds, NW corner of W Main and State streets	Harbor Springs	May 5, 1964
L'Arbre Croche Informational Designation		Region stretching from Harbor Springs to Cross Village	Cross Village	February 12, 1959
Legs Inn	Legs Inn-Good Hart, MI	6425 Lakeshore Drive	Cross Village	May 10, 1990
Little Traverse Bay Informational Designation		Roadside Park on US-31, 1 mile west of Petoskey	Resort Township	September 17, 1957
Michigan's First Jewish Settler Informational Designation		Fort Michilimackinac State Park	Mackinaw City	August 8, 1963
Charles J. Pailthorpe House		613 East Mitchell Street	Petoskey	July 17, 1986
Passenger Pigeons Informational Designation		3377 1/2 Oden Road (one mile west of Oden, on US-31)	Littlefield Township	January 19, 1957
Perry Hotel	Perry Hotel	100 Lewis, Corner of Bay and Lewis Streets	Petoskey	July 15, 1999
Pioneer Picnic Park Commemorative Designation		Lark's Lake Park (Round Lake Park), 1.5 mi. S of County Rd. 66, between Lark's Lake and Canby roads	Center Township	August 13, 1971
Ramona Park Hotel (demolished)		1157 Beach Dr.	Harbor Springs	October 17, 1974
St. Francis Solanus Mission†	St. Francis Solanus Mission	475 West Lake Street	Petoskey	August 13, 1971
Saint Francis Xavier Roman Catholic Church	Saint Francis Xavier - Petoskey	415 State Street	Petoskey	April 23, 1985
Saint Ignatius Roman Catholic Church Complex	Saint Ignatius Roman Catholic Church	Middle Village Drive at Church Road	Readmond Township	December 14, 1976
Saint John's Episcopal Church	St. Johns Episcopal Church-Harbor Springs	Northeast corner of West Third and Traverse streets	Harbor Springs	November 14, 1974
Shay Complex†		SW corner of Main and Judd streets	Harbor Springs	August 8, 1963
Swing Bridge		River Street at Bantwell Road	Alanson	April 24, 1981

== See also ==
- National Register of Historic Places listings in Emmet County, Michigan

== Sources ==
- Historic Sites Online – Emmet County. Michigan State Housing Developmental Authority. Accessed January 23, 2011.
