= New Life Anglican Church =

Historic church in Michigan, United States

- New Life Anglican Church; Formerly Trinity Evangelical Church
- U.S. National Register of Historic Places
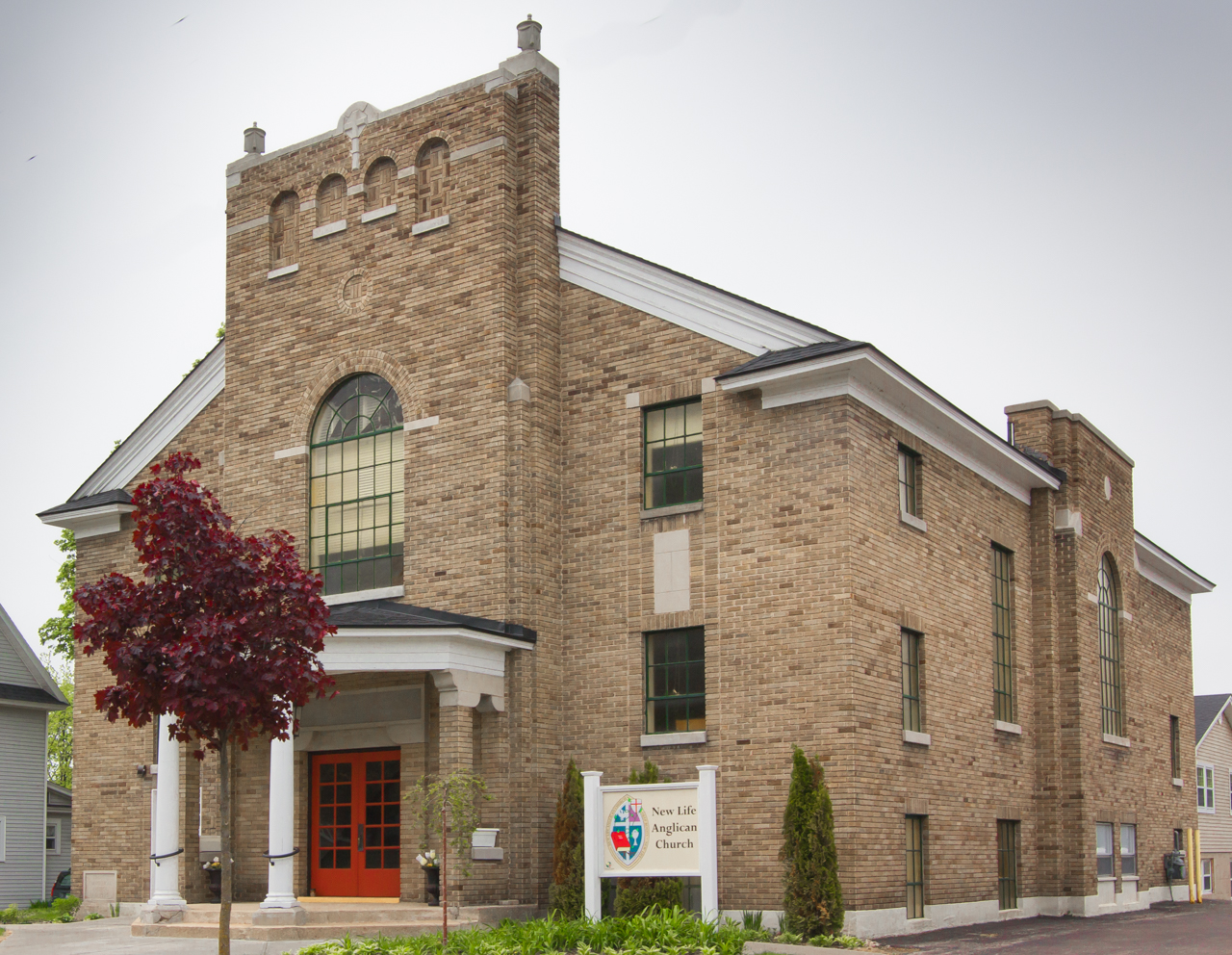

- Location within Michigan Location within the United States
- Interactive map
- Location: 219 State Street, Petoskey, Michigan
- Coordinates: 45°22′14″N 84°57′21″W
- Area: 0.5 acres (0.20 ha)
- Built: 1929
- Architectural style: Classical Revival
- MPS: Petoskey MRA
- NRHP reference No.: 86002082
- Added to NRHP: September 10, 1986

New Life Anglican Church is an Anglican parish located in a historic church building at 219 State Street in Petoskey, Michigan. It was placed on the National Register of Historic Places in 1986 under the name Trinity Evangelical Church.

== History ==
The Trinity Evangelical Church was founded in 1878, and the congregation first met in private homes. Two years later, they constructed a church at the corner of Howard and Grove Street. They later sold this building, and for a time held services in the Seventh Day Adventist Church. The Trinity Evangelical congregation constructed this church in 1929. The congregation later changed its name to Trinity Missionary Church in the Missionary Church.

In 2013, Trinity Missionary Church relocated to a newer building on the east side of Petoskey and sold its NRHP-listed State Street building to New Life Anglican Church, a church plant of the Anglican Church in North America in the Anglican Diocese of the Great Lakes.

== Description ==
The church is a 2 1/2-story Classical Revival brick structure with a single story polygonal entrance and a gable roof. The front facade has a central projecting feature containing a large multi-paned window in a round arch, and topped with four blind archways. This feature is repeated on the side facades. Additional windows along the side are multi-paned rectangular units.
