= Sarah Pennington House =

Historic house in Michigan, United States

- U.S. National Register of Historic Places
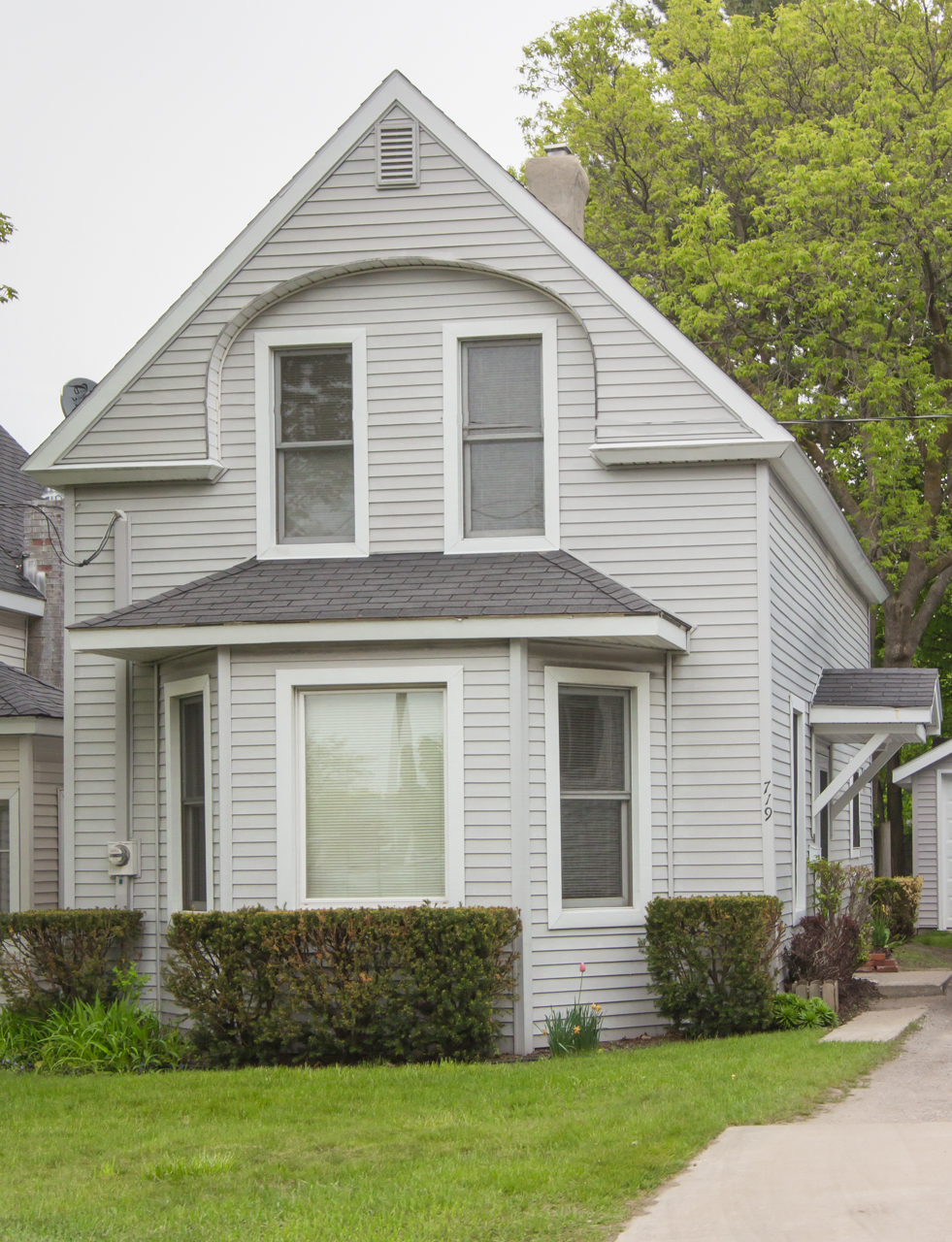

- Location within Michigan Location within the United States
- Interactive map
- Location: 719 Maple St., Petoskey, Michigan
- Coordinates: 45°22′9″N 84°58′7″W
- Area: 0.3 acres (0.12 ha)
- Architectural style: Colonial Revival, Queen Anne, Shingle Style
- MPS: Petoskey MRA
- NRHP reference No.: 86002045
- Added to NRHP: September 10, 1986

The Sarah Pennington House is a private house located at 719 Maple Street in Petoskey, Michigan. It was placed on the National Register of Historic Places in 1986.

The Sarah Pennington House is a 1 1/2-story frame Queen Anne structure with a front roof gable. The gable end on the front facade has an elliptical arch seen in Colonial Revival and Shingle Style designs. Below the gable is a single story polygonal bay window with a hipped roof. The entrance is located on the side of building, through a projecting entrance bay. The house has one-over-one wood-framed window units capped with cornices.

The Sarah Pennington House was constructed some time before 1902. When built, the house was a twin of the structure next door, which implies it may have been erected by a builder as a speculative investment. By 1917 it was owned by Sarah Pennington. Pennington was widowed and used the house to take on boarders.
