= Frank Schapler House =

Historic house in Michigan, United States

- U.S. National Register of Historic Places
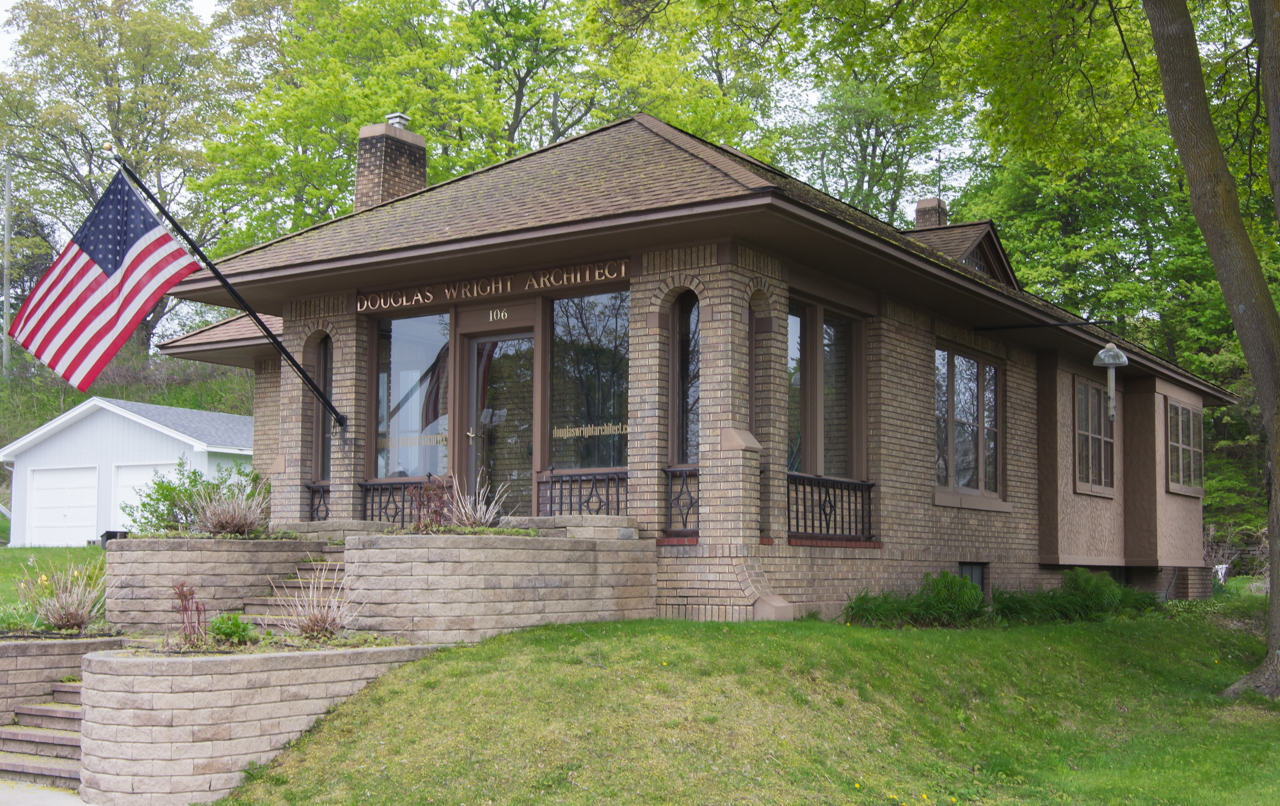

- Location within Michigan Location within the United States
- Interactive map
- Location: 106 E. Lake St., Petoskey, Michigan
- Coordinates: 45°22′30″N 84°57′39″W
- Area: 0.3 acres (0.12 ha)
- Architectural style: Bungalow/Craftsman
- MPS: Petoskey MRA
- NRHP reference No.: 86002074
- Added to NRHP: September 10, 1986

The Frank Schapler House is a private house located at 106 East Lake Street in Petoskey, Michigan. It was placed on the National Register of Historic Places in 1986.

The Frank Schapler House is an unusual example in Petoskey of a bungalow with Prairie School and Period architectural influences. It is a hip-roof bungalow constructed of blond brick. It has hip-roof entrance porch, supported by pier arches, positioned asymmetrically in the front. The house has "Chicago style" windows, with a broad central unit flanked by narrower windows.

The Frank Schapler House was likely constructed in the 1920s.
