= Jacob VanZolenburg House =

Historic house in Michigan, United States

- U.S. National Register of Historic Places
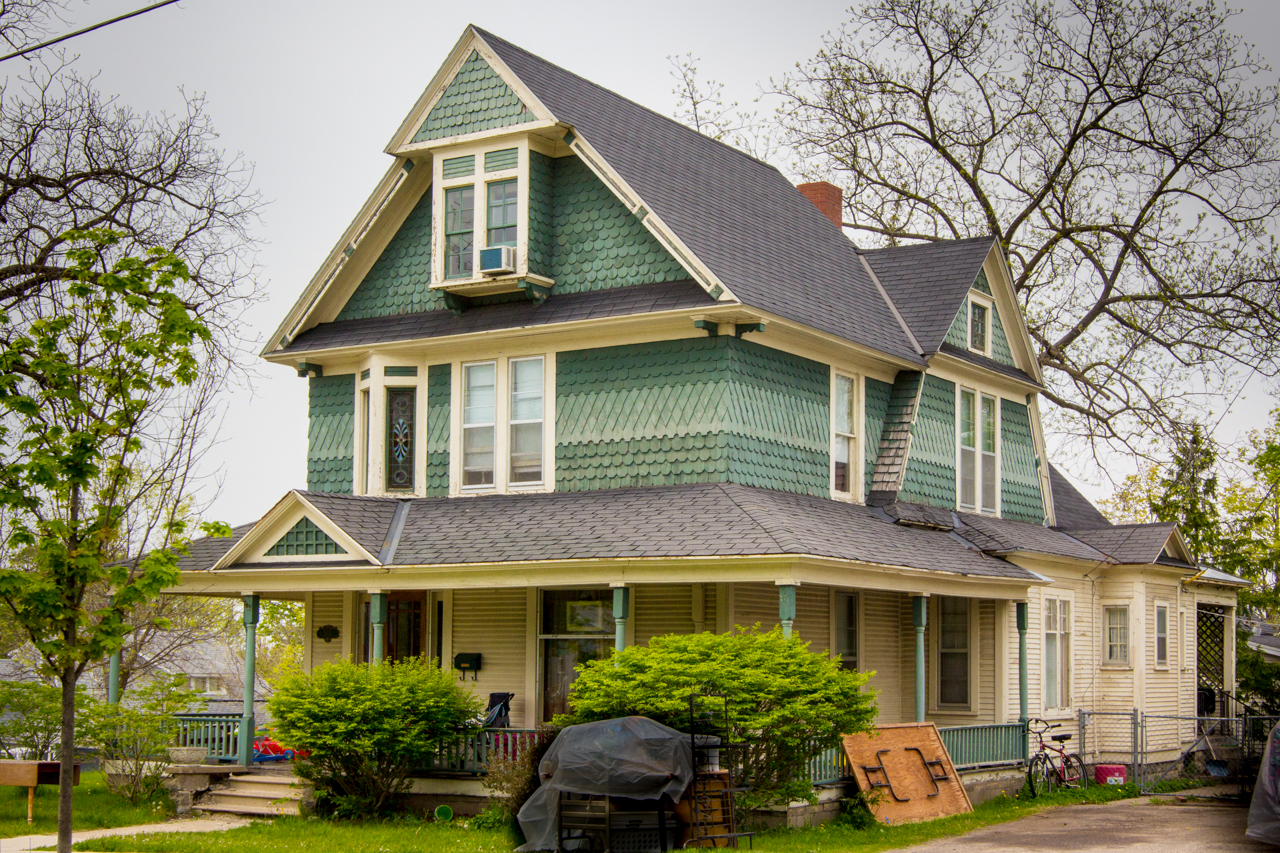

- Location within Michigan Location within the United States
- Interactive map
- Location: 209 State St., Petoskey, Michigan
- Coordinates: 45°22′20″N 84°57′32″W
- Area: 0.3 acres (0.12 ha)
- Built: pre- 1899
- Architectural style: Queen Anne
- MPS: Petoskey MRA
- NRHP reference No.: 86002083
- Added to NRHP: September 10, 1986

The Jacob VanZolenburg House is a private house located at 209 State Street in Petoskey, Michigan. It was placed on the National Register of Historic Places in 1986.

The Jacob VanZolenburg House is a 2 1/2-story front-gable Queen Anne structure. A single-story wing extends to the rear. The first floor is clad in clapboard, and the second story is clad with decorative shingling. A porch wraps around one side, and a bay window projects under the front gable. Smaller side gables, formed to mimic a gambrel shape, intersect the main roof toward the rear.

The Jacob VanZolenburg House was constructed some time before 1899. Jacob VanZolenburg lived in the house by 1903. By 1917, the house was owned by Cook Bockes, proprietor of Cook Electric Company. Irma Horton, a musician, boarded with the Bockes family.
