= Hosman and Wheeler Meat Market =

- U.S. National Register of Historic Places
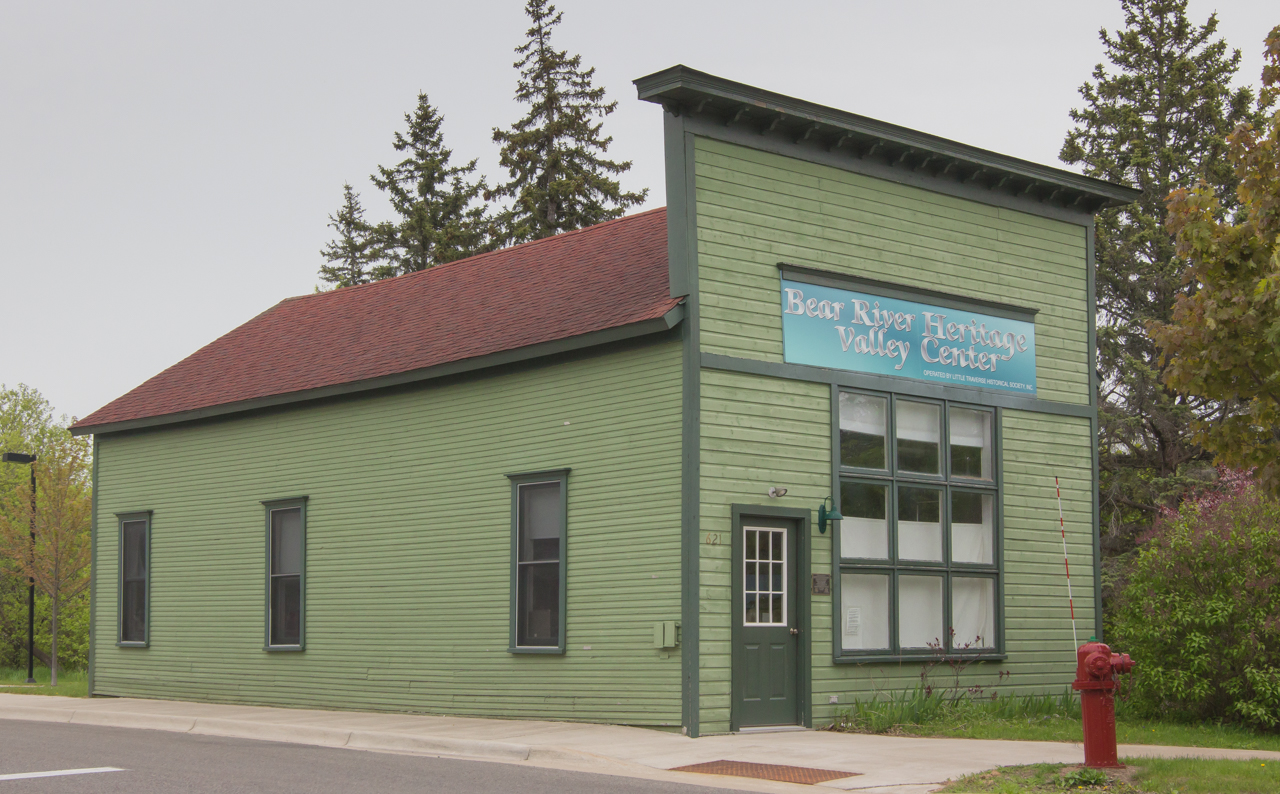

- Location within Michigan Location within the United States
- Interactive map
- Location: 621 Ingalls Ave., Petoskey, Michigan
- Coordinates: 45°22′14″N 84°57′56″W
- Area: 0.3 acres (0.12 ha)
- Architectural style: Italianate
- MPS: Petoskey MRA
- NRHP reference No.: 86002015
- Added to NRHP: September 10, 1986

The Hosman and Wheeler Meat Market is a small commercial structure located at 621 Ingalls Avenue in Petoskey, Michigan. It was placed on the National Register of Historic Places in 1986.

The Hosman and Wheeler Meat Market is a single-story frame Italianate gable roof commercial structure. The facade has a false front topped with a simple bracketed cornice and an entry door at the base. The building is clad with wooden clapboards.

The Hosman and Wheeler Meat Market is characteristic of the sort of small retail businesses which have been located in Petoskey's residential neighborhoods. It is associated with the Hosman and Wheeler Meat Market, which operated at this location since the 1890s. It has also been used by the city as a storage facility and a polling place.
