= John Kabler House =

Historic house in Michigan, United States

- U.S. National Register of Historic Places
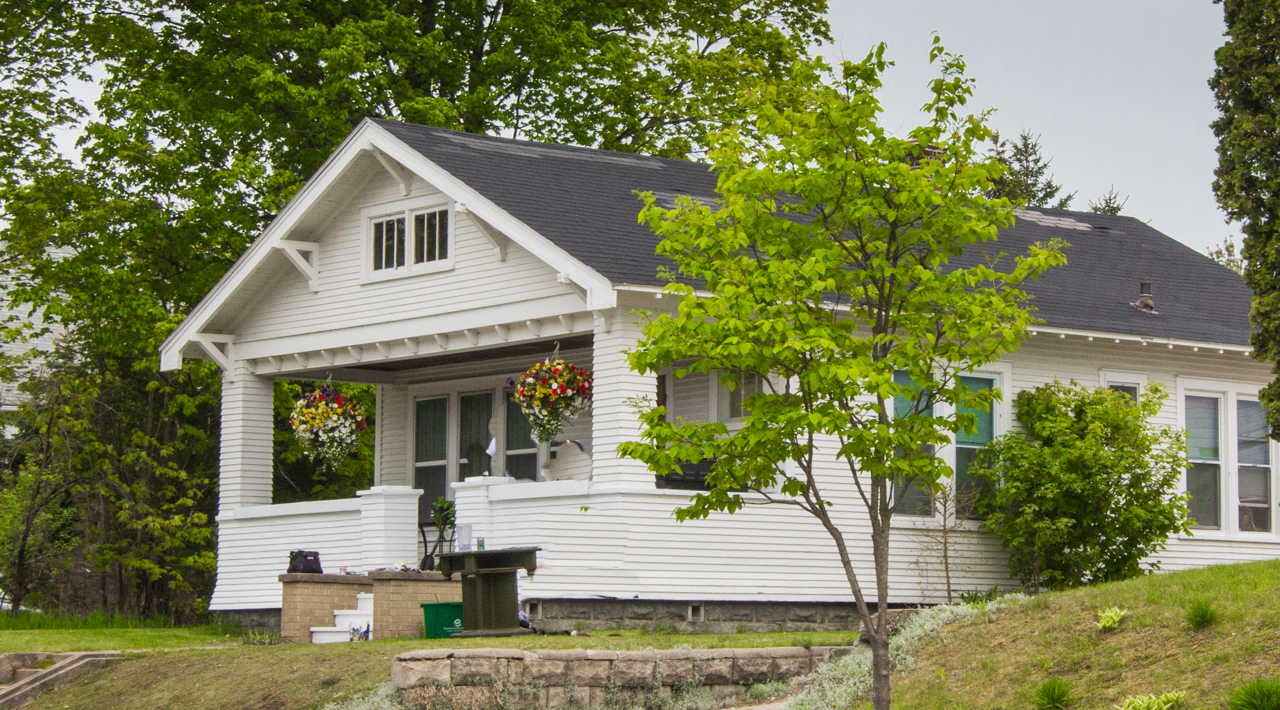

- Location within Michigan Location within the United States
- Interactive map
- Location: 415 Jackson St., Petoskey, Michigan
- Coordinates: 45°22′17″N 84°58′1″W
- Area: 0.3 acres (0.12 ha)
- Architectural style: Bungalow/craftsman
- MPS: Petoskey MRA
- NRHP reference No.: 86002017
- Added to NRHP: September 10, 1986

The John Kabler House is a private house located at 415 Jackson Street in Petoskey, Michigan. It was placed on the National Register of Historic Places in 1986.

The John Kabler House is a 1 1/2-story bungalow with a front porch supported by piers. The building is clad with clapboard, and the eaves of the roof are exposed. The windows have vertical panes above single lights.

The house was constructed in the 1920s, and is associated with John Kabler, who worked at the Northern Michigan Pulp Company.
