= G. W. Olin House =

Historic house in Michigan, United States

- U.S. National Register of Historic Places
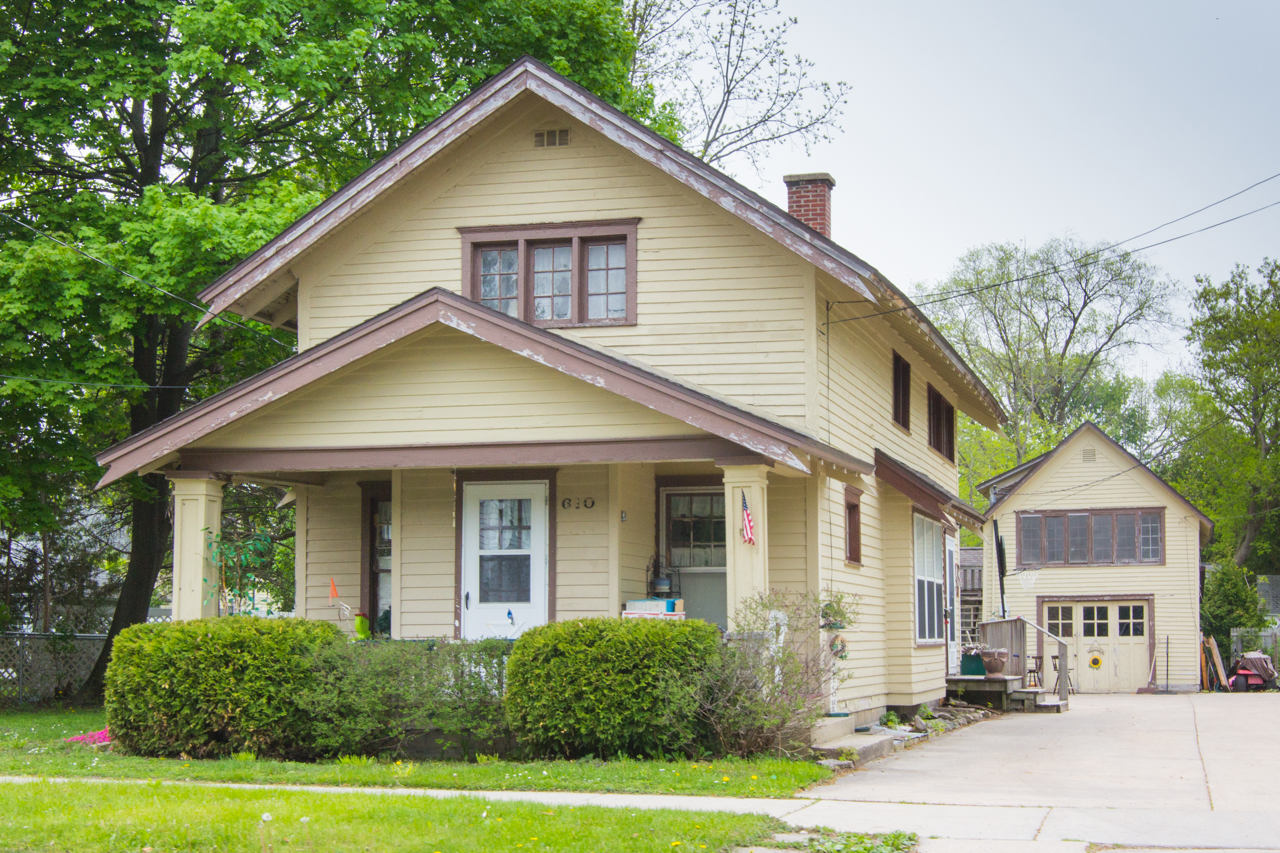

- Location within Michigan Location within the United States
- Interactive map
- Location: 610 Kalamazoo St., Petoskey, Michigan
- Coordinates: 45°22′17″N 84°56′44″W
- Area: 0.3 acres (0.12 ha)
- Architectural style: Bungalow/Craftsman
- MPS: Petoskey MRA
- NRHP reference No.: 86002042
- Added to NRHP: September 10, 1986

The G. W. Olin House is a private house located at 610 Kalamazoo Street in Petoskey, Michigan. It was placed on the National Register of Historic Places in 1986.

The G. W. Olin House is a well-preserved example of a bungalow. It is a 1½-story front-gable structure with a gabled front porch supported by Doric piers. It has exposed eaves and multi-paned windows.

The house was constructed in the late 19th century, possibly in 1898. G.W Olin and his wife lived in the house in 1899, along with their daughter, Nellie, who was a clerk at the Cushman House. By 1903 the Warren family lived in the house.
