= Frank Lesher House =

Historic house in Michigan, United States

- U.S. National Register of Historic Places
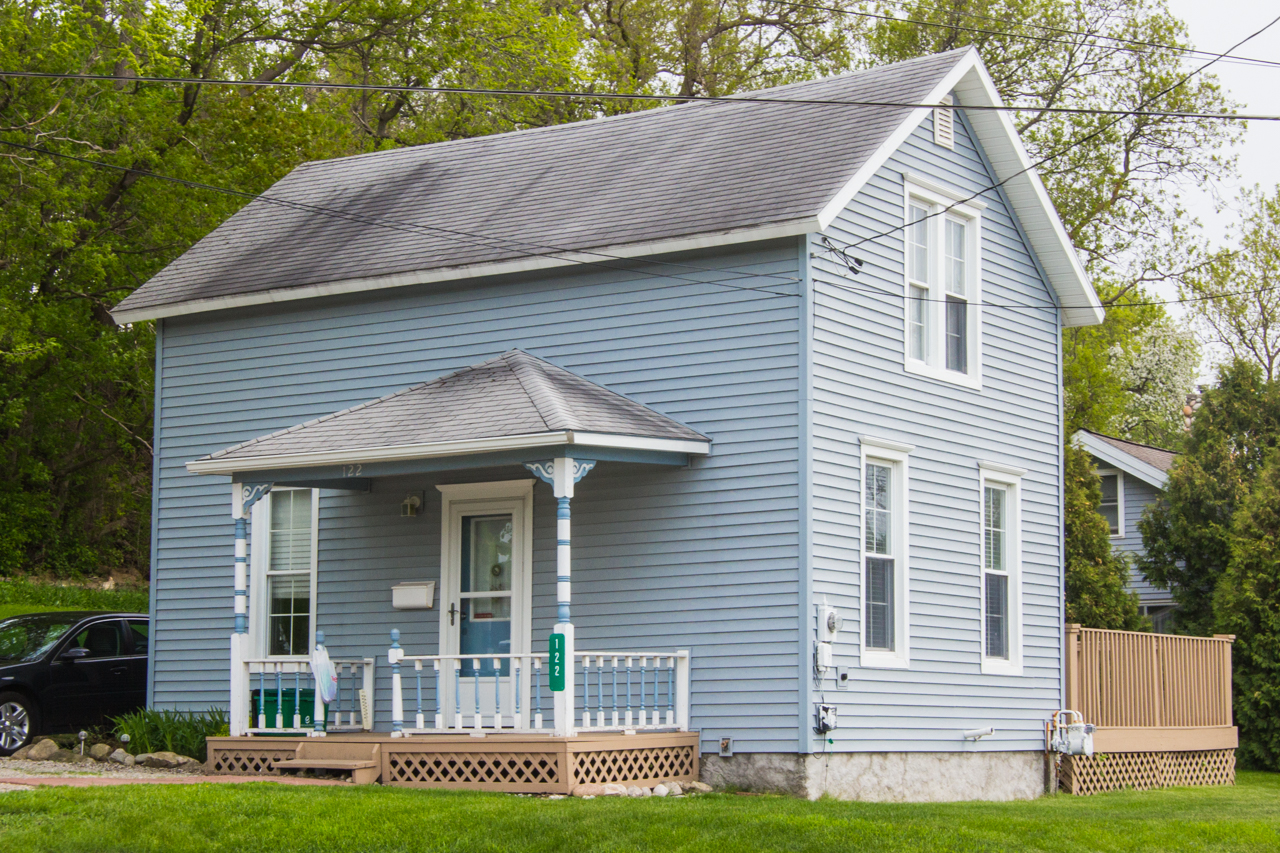

- Location within Michigan Location within the United States
- Interactive map
- Location: 122 Sheridan St., Petoskey, Michigan
- Coordinates: 45°21′54″N 84°57′36″W
- Area: 0.3 acres (0.12 ha)
- Architectural style: Late Victorian
- MPS: Petoskey MRA
- NRHP reference No.: 86002018
- Added to NRHP: September 10, 1986

The Frank Lesher House is a private house located at 122 Sheridan Street in Petoskey, Michigan. It was placed on the National Register of Historic Places in 1986.

The Frank Lesher House is a two-story Late Victorian-style Upright and Wing side-gable frame structure with a single-story wing in the rear. The front entrance is covered by a hip roof porch; a second, shed-roof porch is located at the rear wing. The building is covered with clapboard, and has four-over-four double-hung windows with pediment heads.

The house was constructed in the late 19th century, and is associated with Frank Lesher, who lived here before 1917, and Richard Detcher, who purchased the house some time before 1926.
