= East Mitchell Street Historic District =

Historic district in Michigan, United States

- U.S. National Register of Historic Places
- U.S. Historic district
- Location within Michigan Location within the United States
- Interactive map
- Location: Roughly bounded by Rose, Kalamazoo, State, Howard, Michigan, and Division, Petoskey, Michigan
- Coordinates: 45°22′24″N 84°56′59″W
- Area: 86.5 acres (35.0 ha)
- Built: 1877
- Architectural style: Victorian, Queen Anne, Shingle style, Colonial Revival, Radford-type, Bungalown
- MPS: Petoskey MRA
- NRHP reference No.: 86001983
- Added to NRHP: November 12, 1986

The East Mitchell Street Historic District is a residential historic district located in Petoskey, Michigan. It is roughly bounded by Rose, Kalamazoo, State, Howard, Michigan, and Division streets. The district was listed on the National Register of Historic Places in 1986.

== Description ==
The East Mitchell Street Historic District occupies 31 blocks, and contains 294 residential properties, of which 278 are historically contributing to the district. The houses are predominantly frame structures, 1 1/2 to 2 1/2 stories high. Architectural styles include Victorian, Queen Anne, Shingle style, Colonial Revival, Radford-type, Bungalow, and other period designs, dating from the late 1800s through the 1930s. The district also contains four churches, a parochial school, and a public school.

The central portion of the neighborhood runs along East Mitchell Street, where the residences tend to be larger and more elaborately detailed. East Mitchell runs westward and downhill into the central downtown area of Petoskey, and the East Mitchell Street Historic District lies on parallel streets both north and south of East Mitchell. Landscaping in the district includes a profusion of shade trees and shallow front lawns, sometimes banked behind low retaining walls. Despite physical alterations of many houses (in particular enclosing porches), the overall historic appearance of the district remains intact due to retention of important design elements, and collections of structures with high historic integrity.

The institutional structures in the neighborhood include:

- Emmanuel Episcopal Church (1020 Mitchell) - The church was constructed in 1958, and exhibits a post-World War II version of Gothic Revival architecture. The nearby parish house and parsonage was constructed in 1938.
- First Presbyterian Church (461 Mitchell) - This church was constructed in 1899 as a Gothic Revival/Queen Anne structure, and was remodeled in 1952 in a Colonial Revival design.
- Temple B'nai Israel (501 Michigan) - Originally constructed by the Parr Baptist congregation in 1881 and moved to this site in 1910, the Temple B'nai Israel is a Victorian Gothic Revival structure.
- Parr Memorial Baptist Church (502 Michigan) - This church was constructed in 1910, and exhibits an early 20th century version of Gothic Revival architecture.
- St. Francis Xavier Catholic Church and School (500 block of Howard) - The St. Francis Xavier parish first occupied the site of the current complex in 1879. The church complex contains four buildings: a large brick Gothic Revival church erected in 1903-08, a two-story Gothic Revival monastery erected in 1903, a two-story Spanish Mission Style school from 1927 (with a modern rear addition), and a two-story brick rectory.
- Old Petoskey Senior High and Central Elementary School (600 block of Howard) - The old high school building is a two-story brick structure of Classical Revival design, erected in 1913. The Central School addition to the school is an Art Deco building constructed in 1929.

== History ==
The East Mitchell Street Historic District grew as Petoskey grew, and has served as a neighborhood where a cross section of Petoskey citizens lived, ranging from prominent businessmen to laborers. Many of the houses appear to be constructed from ready-to-use architectural designs. What is likely the oldest structure in the neighborhood, at 519 Kalamazoo Street, dates from 1877. Earlier structures were predominantly Victorian and Queen Anne designs, but at the turn of the century more Colonial Revival houses were constructed. Bungalow houses were also popular in the neighborhood, and a few Prairie and International designs were also executed further into the 20th century.
