= Phillip Rehkopf House =

Historic house in Michigan, United States

- U.S. National Register of Historic Places
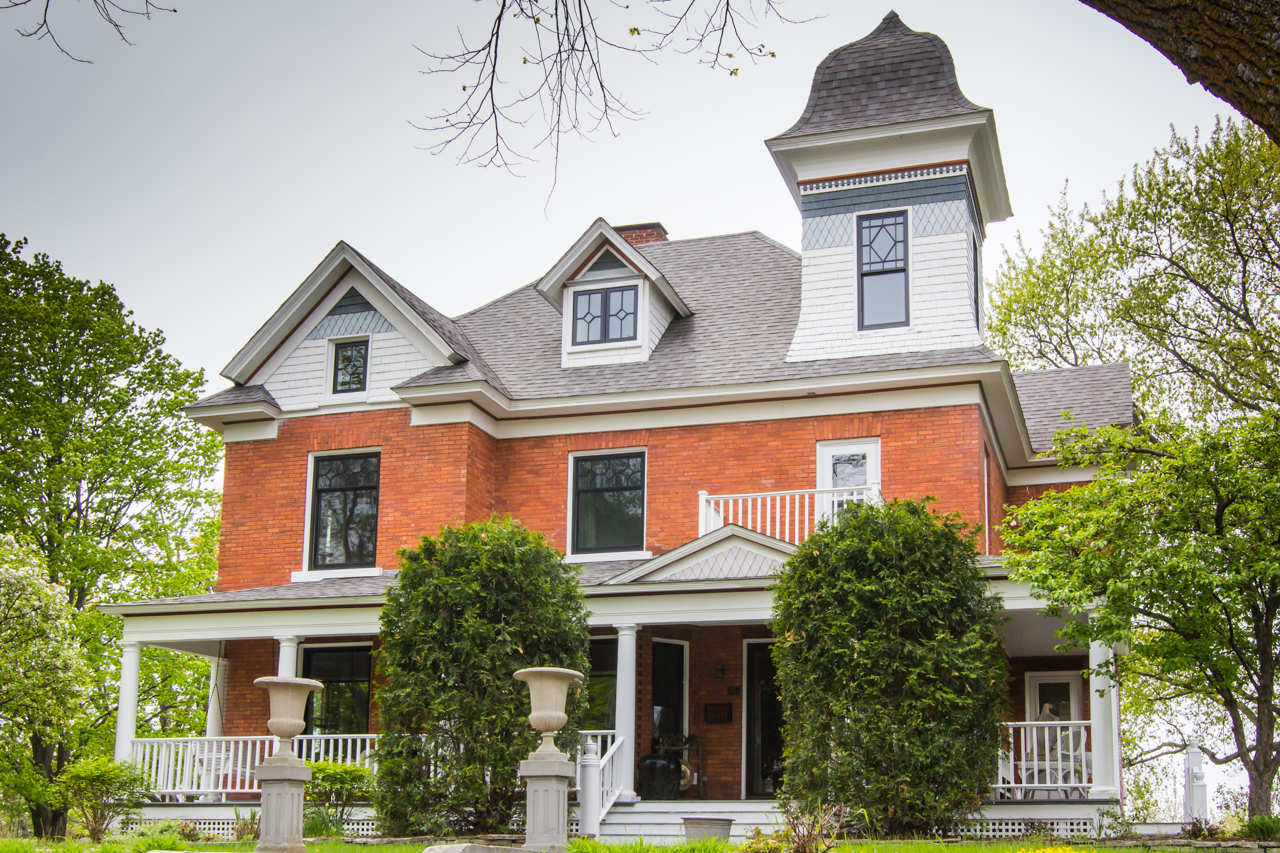

- Location within Michigan Location within the United States
- Interactive map
- Location: 918 Howard St., Petoskey, Michigan
- Coordinates: 45°22′6″N 84°57′21″W
- Area: 0.5 acres (0.20 ha)
- Built by: Phillip Rehkopf
- Architectural style: Queen Anne
- MPS: Petoskey MRA
- NRHP reference No.: 86002069
- Added to NRHP: September 10, 1986

The Phillip Rehkopf House is a private house located at 918 Howard Street in Petoskey, Michigan. It was placed on the National Register of Historic Places in 1986.

The Phillip Rehkopf House is a 2 1/2-story brick Queen Anne structure on a stone basement. It has an L-shaped plan, with the gabled short leg of the L extending toward the front. The gables are clad with wooden shingles. Gabled dormers pierce the roof, as does a small tower with an onion-like dome at one end of the facade. A single story porch supported by Doric columns runs across the facade; the porch and the house itself have classical cornices.

It is likely that Phillip Rehkopf, a mason, built this house himself some time before the turn of the century. Phillip's wife Jane ran a rooming house here for many years.
