= I. N. Debenham House =

Historic house in Michigan, United States

- U.S. National Register of Historic Places
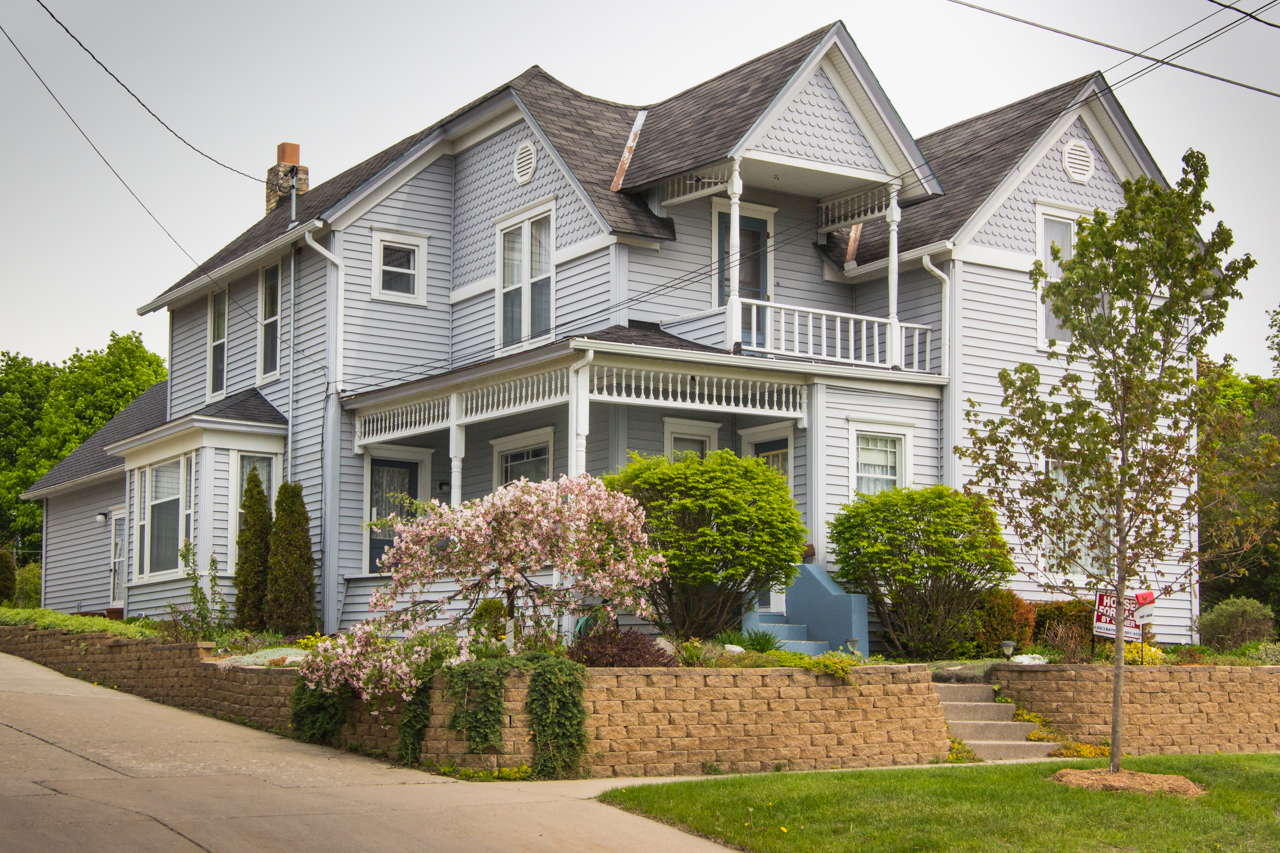

- Location within Michigan Location within the United States
- Interactive map
- Location: 1101 Emmet St., Petoskey, Michigan
- Coordinates: 45°22′0″N 84°57′31″W
- Area: 0.3 acres (0.12 ha)
- Architectural style: Queen Anne
- MPS: Petoskey MRA
- NRHP reference No.: 86001979
- Added to NRHP: September 10, 1986

The I. N. Debenham House is a private house located at 1101 Emmet Street in Petoskey, Michigan. It was placed on the National Register of Historic Places in 1986.

The I. N. Debenham House is a 2 1/2-story frame Queen Anne structure with multiple gabled and hip roof bays. A single-story wing is attached at the rear. The house is covered with clapboards, with fishscale shingles ornamenting the gable ends. A single-story porch wraps around the facade, with an additional small porch on the second story. Both porches have turned decorative elements. The windows have a single pane on the bottom, with multi-light units above.

The house was built some time before 1899. It is associated with I.N. Debenham, a carpenter who lived here around the turn of the century, and Benjamin Snatts, an inspector for the Michigan Telephone Company, who lived here after 1903.
