= J. M. Wells House =

Historic house in Michigan, US

- U.S. National Register of Historic Places
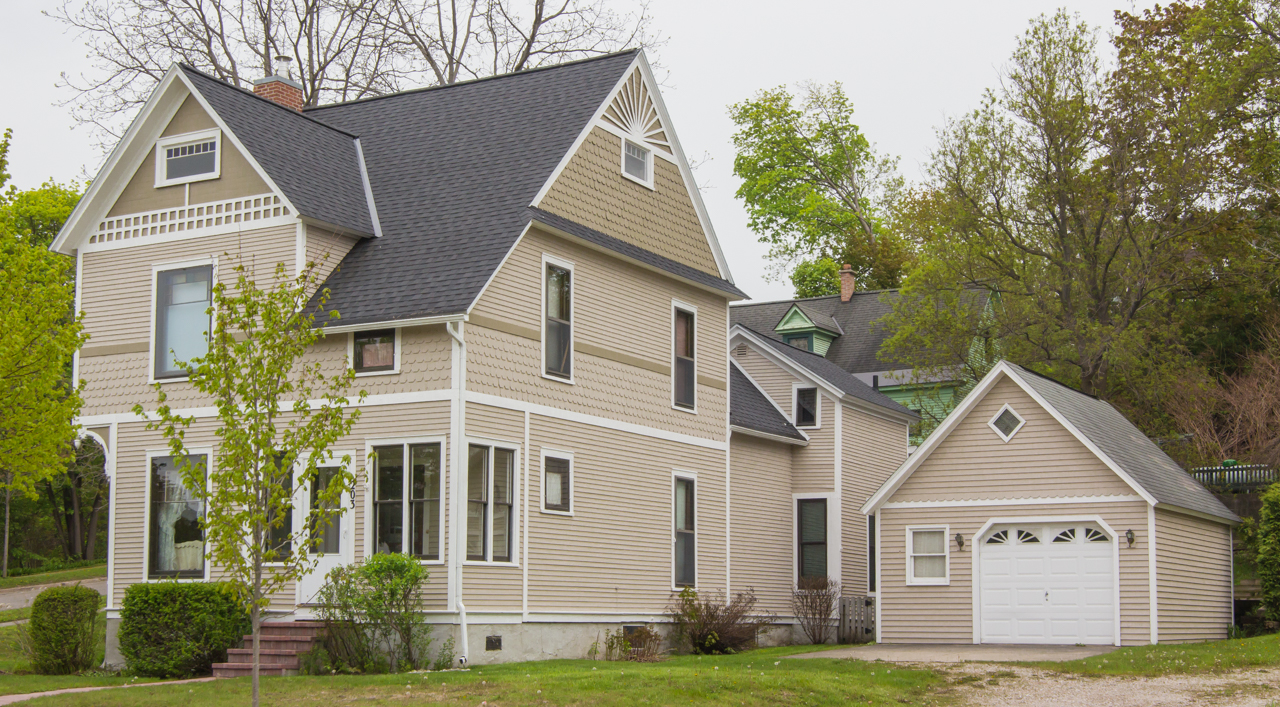

- Location within Michigan Location within the United States
- Interactive map
- Location: 203 W. Lake St., Petoskey, Michigan
- Coordinates: 45°22′29″N 84°57′45″W
- Area: 0.3 acres (0.12 ha)
- Built: c. 1899
- Architectural style: Queen Anne
- MPS: Petoskey MRA
- NRHP reference No.: 86002084
- Added to NRHP: September 10, 1986

The J. M. Wells House is a private house located at 203 Lake Street in Petoskey, Michigan. It was placed on the National Register of Historic Places in 1986.

The J. M. Wells House is a two-and-a-half-story frame Queen Anne side gable structure. A gabled bay on the front facade intersects the main gable; an enclosed entrance porch is adjacent to the bay. The building is clad with clapboard siding, with a band of fishscales above the first story level. Windows are one-over-one double hung units.

This house was built in approximately 1899. It was associated with J. M. Wells, who was the proprietor of a business in Petoskey at the turn of the century. By 1917, it was owned by James Riggle, proprietor of the Open Air Roller Rink. By 1928, James Dickes was the owner.
