= Gerhard Fochtman House =

Historic house in Michigan, United States

- U.S. National Register of Historic Places
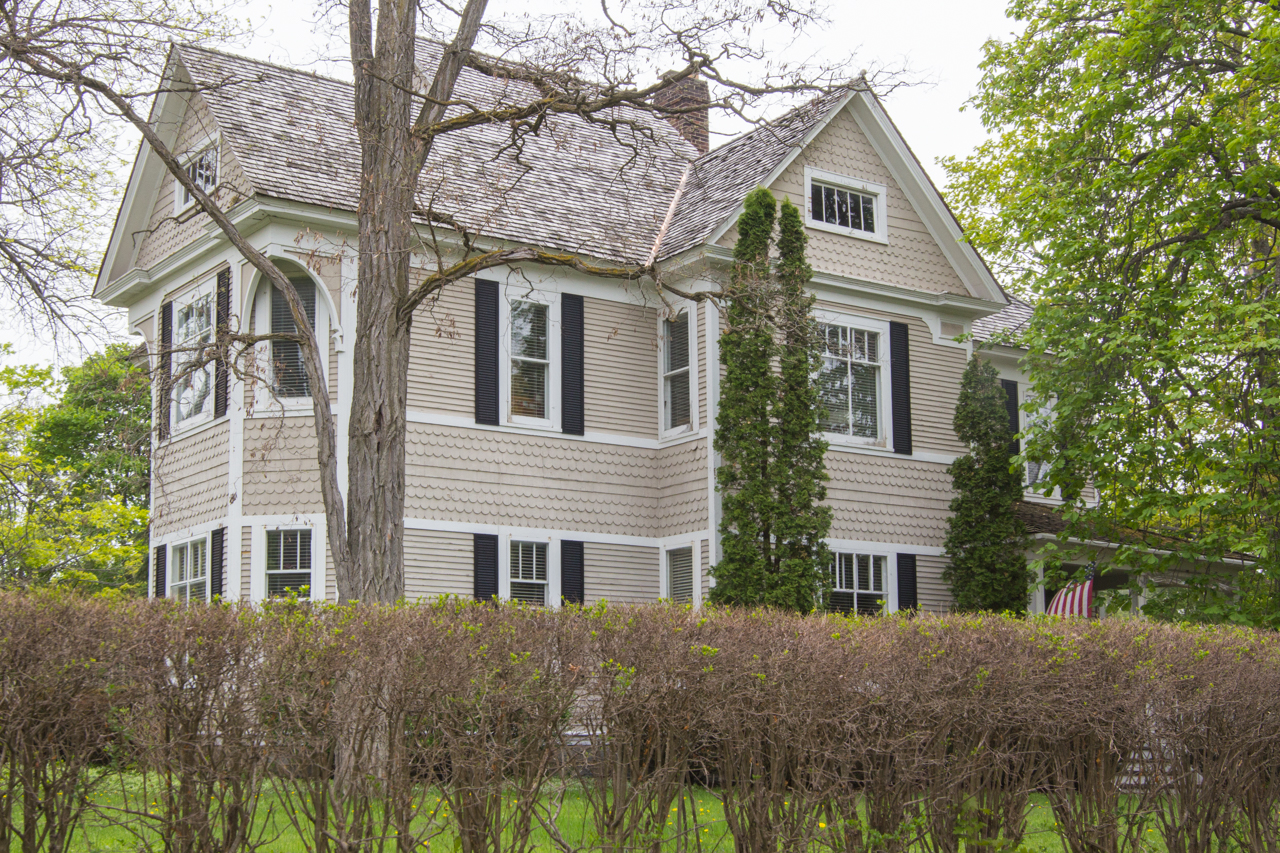

- Location within Michigan Location within the United States
- Interactive map
- Location: 1004 Waukazoo Ave., Petoskey, Michigan
- Coordinates: 45°22′7″N 84°57′12″W
- Area: 0.3 acres (0.12 ha)
- Architectural style: Queen Anne
- MPS: Petoskey MRA
- NRHP reference No.: 86001998
- Added to NRHP: September 10, 1986

The Gerhard Fochtman House is a private house located at 1004 Waukazoo Avenue in Petoskey, Michigan. It was placed on the National Register of Historic Places in 1986.

The Gerhard Fochtman House is a 2 1/2-story frame Queen Anne structure. It is covered with narrow clapboard, with additional fishscale shingles on the gables and in an ornamental band between the first and second stories. The roof has multiple gables, with gabled bays projecting from the central mass of the house. A single story shed-roffed porch extends in the rear of the building. The windows have vertical panes set above a single light.

The house was built some time before 1899. It is significant because of its association with Gerhard Fochtman, the owner of Fochtman's Livery Barn around the turn of the century. The Fochtman family was a locally prominent family of merchants in Petoskey.
