= Ponshewaing Point Site =

- U.S. National Register of Historic Places
- Location within Michigan Location within the United States
- Nearest city: Ponshewaing, Michigan
- Coordinates: 45°25′0″N 84°48′0″W
- Area: less than one acre
- NRHP reference No.: 72001473
- Added to NRHP: May 5, 1972

The Ponshewaing Point Site (designated 20EM18) is an archaeological site located on Ponshewaing Point in Crooked Lake in Emmet County, Michigan. It was places on the National Register of Historic Places in 1972.

This site was in use approximately AD 800 - 1500, covering several Middle and Late Woodland period occupations. "Ponshewaing" (or "Pon-she-waing") is typically translated as "winter home," which may indicate a year-round occupation.

Test excavations were completed at the Ponshewaing Point Site in 1966–67. The site was more intensively excavated by researchers from Michigan State University in 1970. Excavations revealed multiple components, including four basic pit types. Post mold shapes indicate two distinct dwellings.
