= Shafer's Grocery and Residence =

Historic building in Michigan, United States

- U.S. National Register of Historic Places
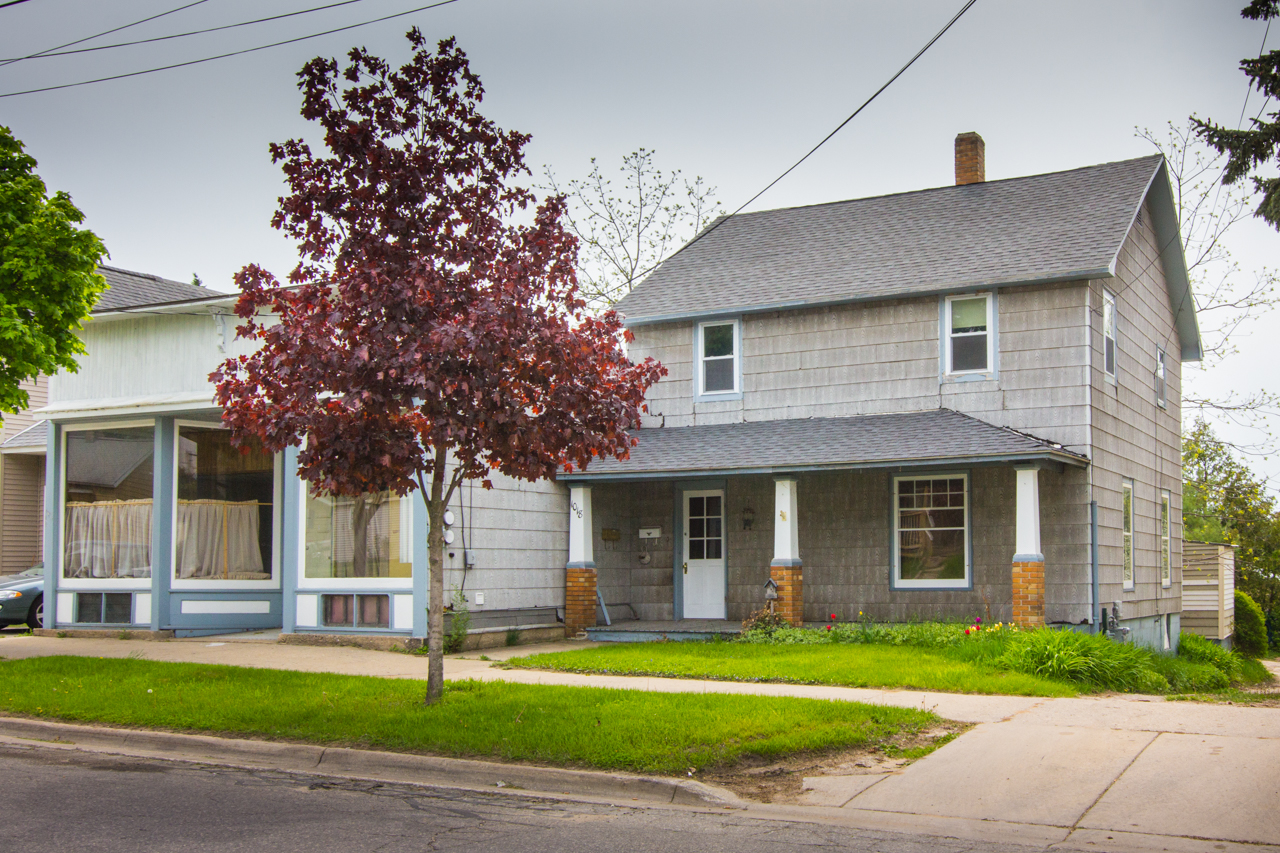

- Location within Michigan Location within the United States
- Interactive map
- Location: 1018 Emmet St., Petoskey, Michigan
- Coordinates: 45°22′4″N 84°57′33″W
- Area: 0.3 acres (0.12 ha)
- Architectural style: Italianate, Commercial Palace
- MPS: Petoskey MRA
- NRHP reference No.: 86002079
- Added to NRHP: September 10, 1986

The Shafer's Grocery and Residence is a commercial and residential building located at 1018 Emmet Street in Petoskey, Michigan. It was added to the National Register of Historic Places in 1986.

Shafer's Grocery and Residence comprises two interconnected buildings: the store and an adjacent residence. The store is a single-story frame commercial structure featuring a central entrance flanked by expansive glass windows. The store has a flat roof with a simple bracketed cornice. The walls of the structure are clad with asbestos shingles. The attached residence is a two-story gabled structure with a front porch running the full width of the house.

The structure was built for the grocery business of Robert Shafer, who operated here in the late 19th century. By the 1930s, a used furniture business operated by Jennie Cross was located here.
