= Isaac Bartram House =

Historic house in Michigan, United States

- U.S. National Register of Historic Places
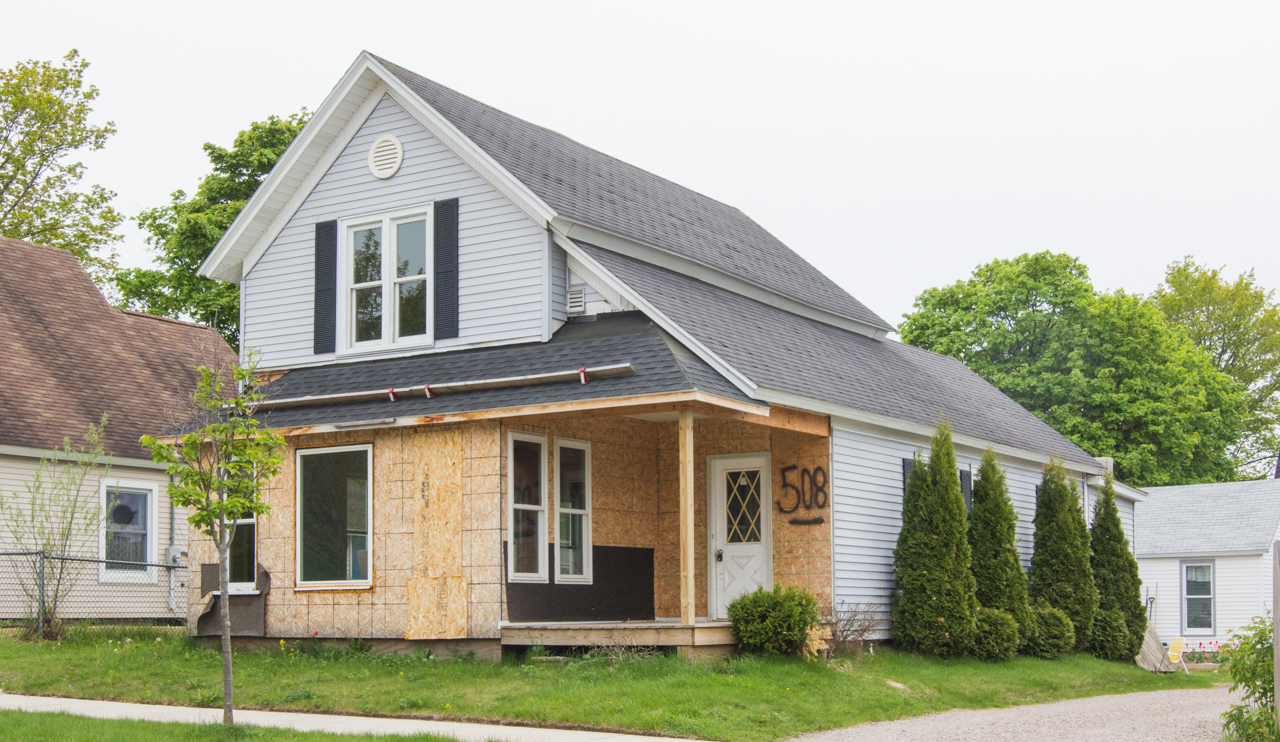

- Location within Michigan Location within the United States
- Interactive map
- Location: 508 Wachtel Ave., Petoskey, Michigan
- Coordinates: 45°22′23″N 84°57′46″W
- Area: 0.3 acres (0.12 ha)
- Built: 1903
- Architectural style: Queen Anne
- MPS: Petoskey MRA
- NRHP reference No.: 86001975
- Added to NRHP: September 10, 1986

The Isaac Bartram House is a private house located at 508 Wachtel Avenue in Petoskey, Michigan. It was placed on the National Register of Historic Places in 1986.

The Isaac Bartram House is a two-story front-gable Queen Anne structure with a single story wing extending to the rear. A one-story entrance porch with a shed roof has decorative turned elements. The house is clad with clapboards, and has one-over-one windows with cornices above.

The house was constructed before 1903, and is associated with Isaac Bartram, a laborer at Darling & Beahan's seed and implement store.
