= A. Malin House =

Historic house in Michigan, United States

- U.S. National Register of Historic Places
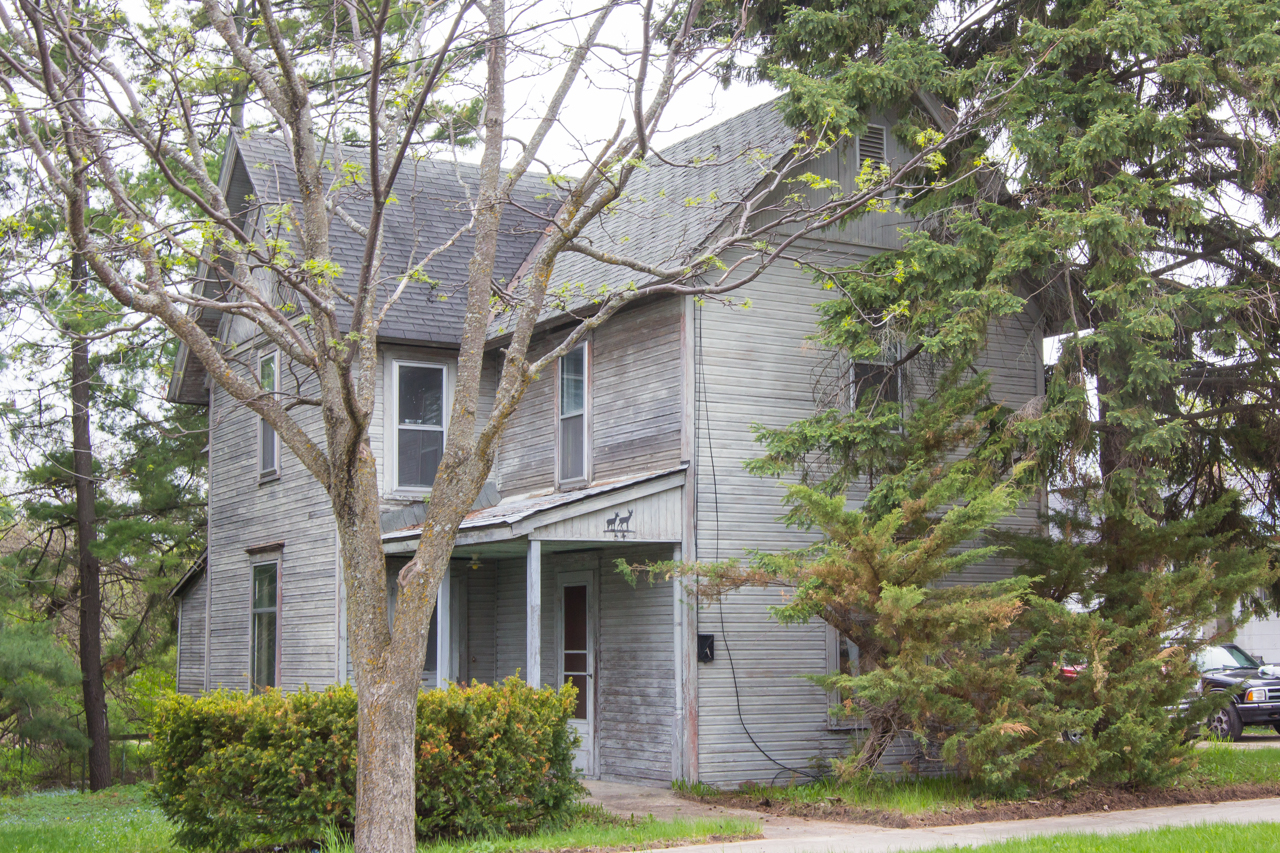

- Location within Michigan Location within the United States
- Interactive map
- Location: 54 Bridge St., Petoskey, Michigan
- Coordinates: 45°22′7″N 84°57′46″W
- Area: 0.3 acres (0.12 ha)
- Architectural style: Queen Anne
- MPS: Petoskey MRA
- NRHP reference No.: 86002020
- Added to NRHP: September 10, 1986

The A. Malin House is a private house located at 54 Bridge Street in Petoskey, Michigan. It was placed on the National Register of Historic Places in 1986.

The A. Malin House is a two-story frame Queen Anne house with an intersecting gable roof. A front gable faces the street and a shed roofed side porch covers two entrances. A rear porch fills the angle between the gables, and a single story addition projects to the rear. The windows are one-over-one units with simple cornices.

The A. Malin House was constructed some time before 1899, when A. Malin lived here. By 1903, Robert Kepsel and Peter Myers, a laborer, live in the house. Charles Rice, a cook, moved in by 1917 and lived here until at least 1926.
