= Fourth Ward Polling Place =

- U.S. National Register of Historic Places
- Location within Michigan Location within the United States
- Interactive map
- Location: 209 Washington St., Petoskey, Michigan
- Coordinates: 45°22′6″N 84°57′29″W
- Area: 0.3 acres (0.12 ha)
- Architectural style: Classical Revival
- MPS: Petoskey MRA
- NRHP reference No.: 86002001
- Added to NRHP: September 10, 1986

The Fourth Ward Polling Place was a municipal building located at 209 Washington Street in Petoskey, Michigan. It was placed on the National Register of Historic Places in 1986. The building is missing and presumed demolished.

The Fourth Ward Polling Place was a single story, gable-roofed Classical Revival structure built of concrete block and faced with rock. The facade had a stepped parapet, an entrance on one side, and two windows. The side wall had three garage doors and another window.

The building was constructed at some point just after 1907. The building served for many years as a polling place, and for other municipal uses.
