= John Nyman House =

Historic house in Michigan, United States

- U.S. National Register of Historic Places
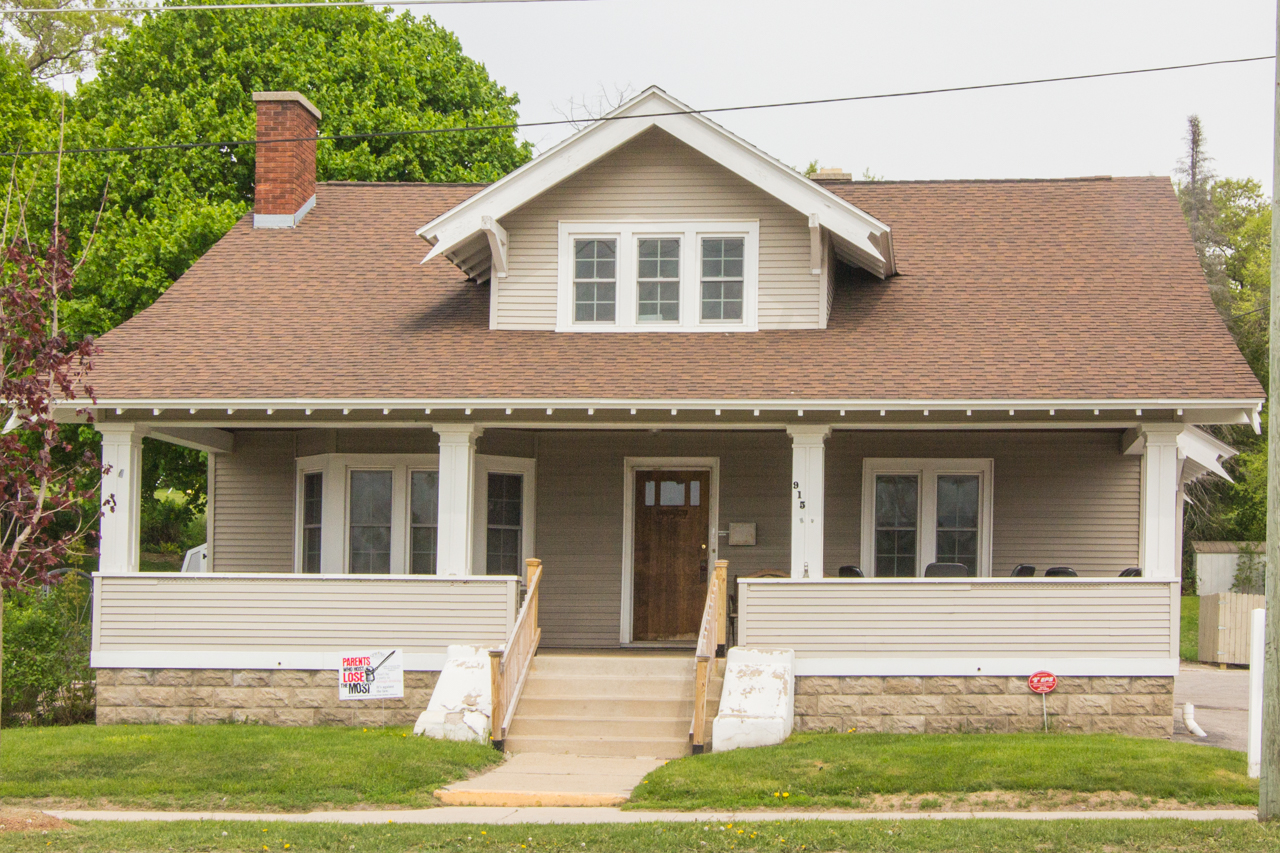

- Location within Michigan Location within the United States
- Interactive map
- Location: 915 Emmet St., Petoskey, Michigan
- Coordinates: 45°22′7″N 84°57′31″W
- Area: 0.3 acres (0.12 ha)
- Architectural style: Bungalow/Craftsman
- MPS: Petoskey MRA
- NRHP reference No.: 86002039
- Added to NRHP: September 10, 1986

The John Nyman House is a private house located at 915 Emmet Street in Petoskey, Michigan. It was placed on the National Register of Historic Places in 1986.

The John Nyman House is a 1 1/2-story side-gable bungalow with wood shingle siding, a gabled dormer, and a front porch whose roof is a continuation of the main roof. The porch has four Doric piers. The main section of the house is rectangular, with a side bay and an octagonal porch bay extending out of the main footprint. Wooden brackets support the gables.

The John Nyman House was constructed around the turn of the century. The Nymans lived in the house for several decades.
