= George Schantz House and Store =

Historic house in Michigan, United States

- U.S. National Register of Historic Places
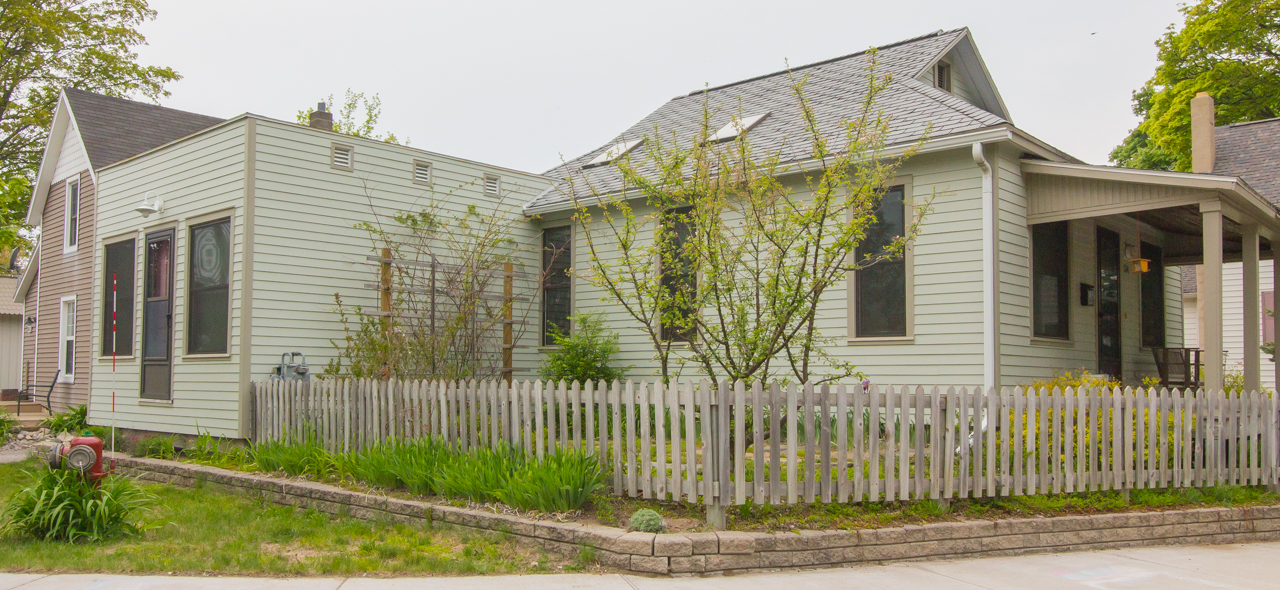

- Location within Michigan Location within the United States
- Interactive map
- Location: 534 Wachtel Ave., Petoskey, Michigan
- Coordinates: 45°22′19″N 84°57′47″W
- Area: 0.3 acres (0.12 ha)
- Architectural style: Italianate, Commercial Palace
- MPS: Petoskey MRA
- NRHP reference No.: 86002072
- Added to NRHP: September 10, 1986

The George Schantz House and Store is a private house and associated commercial building located at 534 Wachtel Avenue in Petoskey, Michigan. It was placed on the National Register of Historic Places in 1986.

The George Schantz House and Store consists of two connected buildings: a single-story residential structure facing onto Watchel Avenue and a single-story commercial structure placed at right angles and facing onto Jackson Street. The residential structure is a frame building with a gabble-on-hip roof and a shed roof porch in the front, supported by wooden posts. The house is clad in clapboard and has one-over-one double-hung windows. The store has a flat roof and a center entrance between two broad windows. A low retaining wall surrounds the two structures.

The George Schantz Residence and Store is a well-preserved example in Petoskey of a residence and attached store, fitting into the local tradition of small commercial establishments located in residential neighborhoods. The building was owned in the 1920s and later by George Schantz.
