= Stout House (Petoskey, Michigan) =

Historic house in Michigan, United States

- U.S. National Register of Historic Places
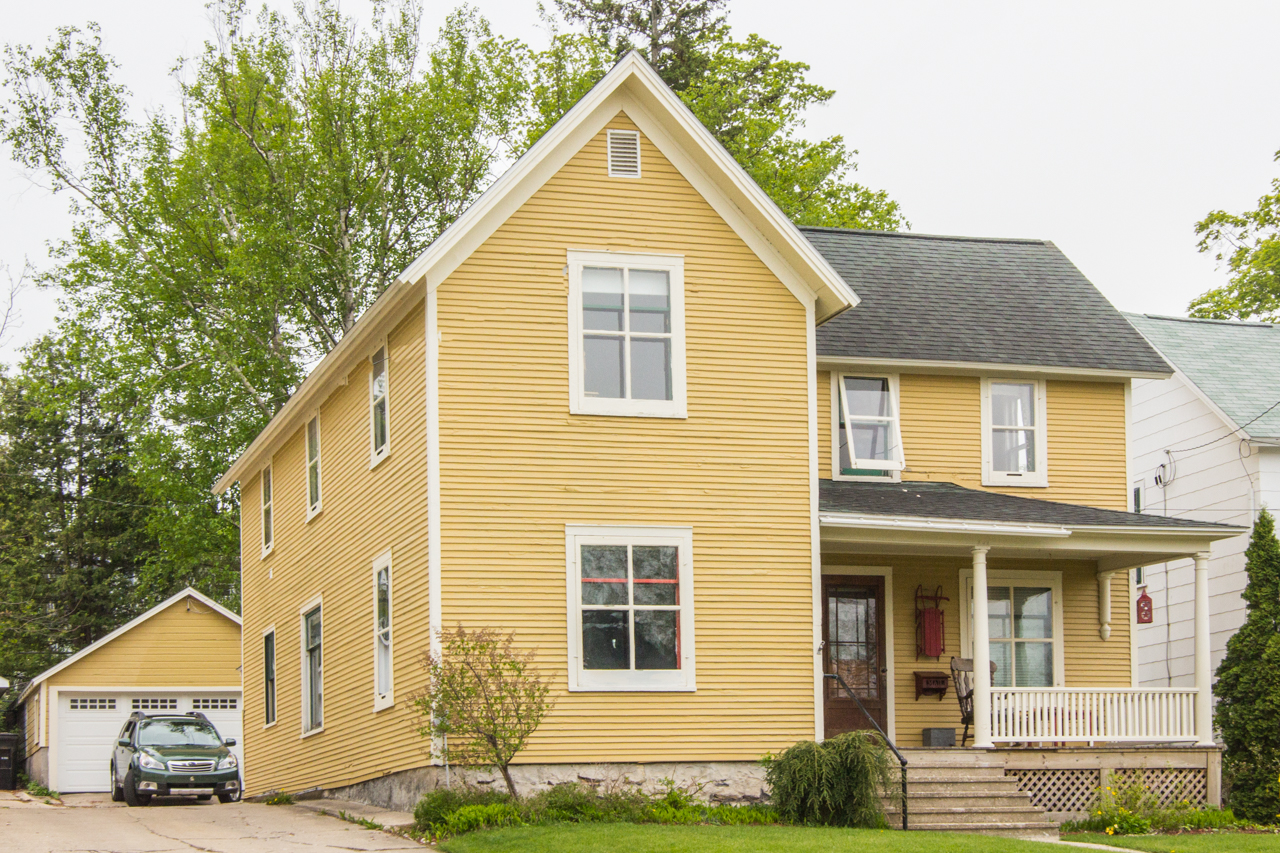

- Location within Michigan Location within the United States
- Interactive map
- Location: 606 Grove St., Petoskey, Michigan
- Coordinates: 45°22′14″N 84°57′5″W
- Area: 0.3 acres (0.12 ha)
- Architectural style: Colonial Revival
- MPS: Petoskey MRA
- NRHP reference No.: 86002080
- Added to NRHP: September 10, 1986

The Stout House is a private house located at 606 Grove Street in Petoskey, Michigan. It was placed on the National Register of Historic Places in 1986.

The Stout House is a two-story frame Colonial Revival structure. It has an L-shaped plan, with the short, gable-roofed section of the L facing the front. A single story wing projects to the rear. A single story hipped roof porch with Doric columns fills the angle between the legs of the L. The windows are one-over-one double hung units.

The Stout family lived in this house until some time after 1903, along with their boarder, Anna Vaughn. By 1917, Joseph Jordan, a carpenter. owned the house, with Anna Vaughn continuing as a boarder. By 1928, John L. Smith owned the house.
