= Bert and John Hobbins House =

Historic house in Michigan, United States

- U.S. National Register of Historic Places
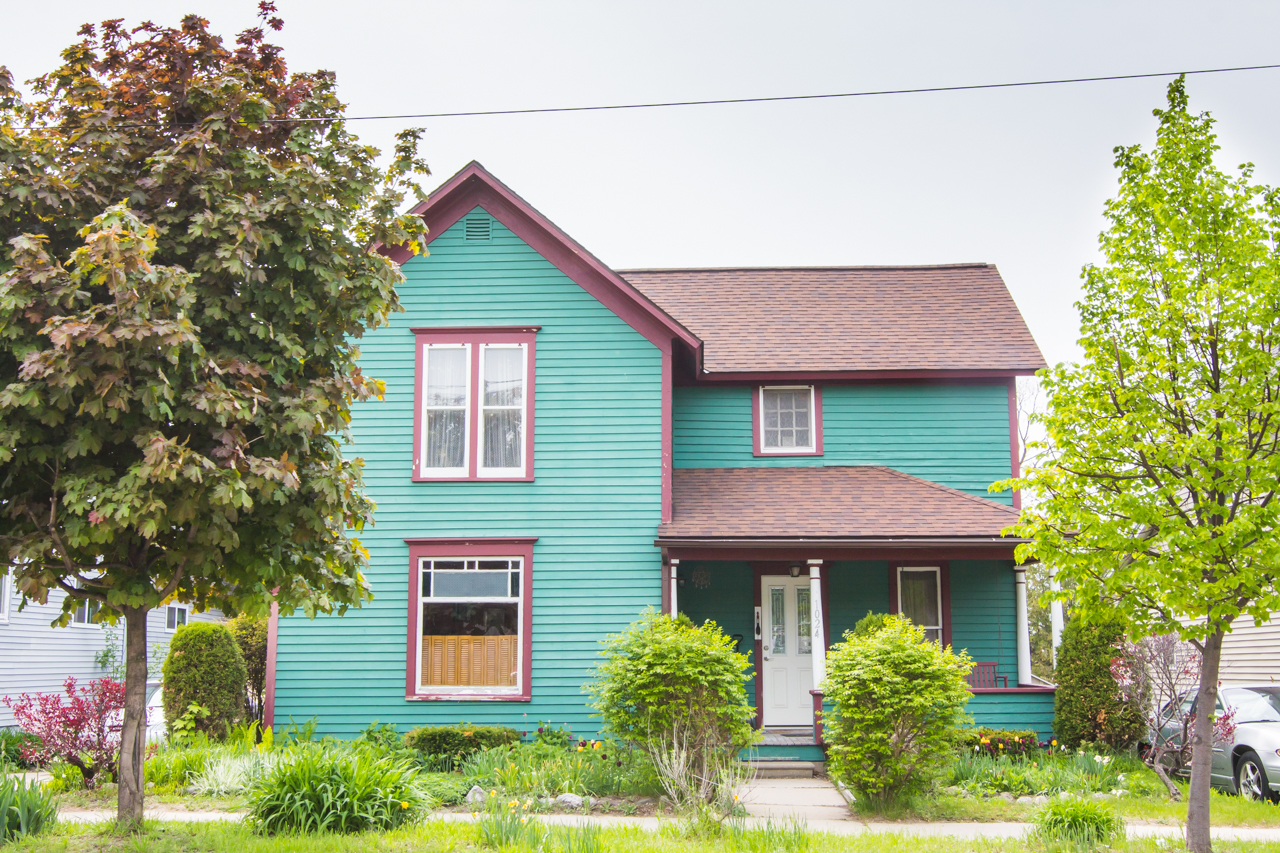

- Location within Michigan Location within the United States
- Interactive map
- Location: 1024 Emmet St., Petoskey, Michigan
- Coordinates: 45°22′4″N 84°57′33″W
- Area: 0.3 acres (0.12 ha)
- Architectural style: Colonial Revival
- MPS: Petoskey MRA
- NRHP reference No.: 86002013
- Added to NRHP: September 10, 1986

The Bert and John Hobbins House is a private house located at 1024 Emmet Street in Petoskey, Michigan. It was placed on the National Register of Historic Places in 1986.

The Bert and John Hobbins House is a two-story frame Colonial Revival structure. It has an L-shaped plan, with the short gable-roofed leg of the L facing the front. A one-story wing extends to the rear. A single-story hip roof porch supported by Doric columns fills the angle between the legs of the L. The walls are clad with clapboards, and the windows are topped by a simple cornice.

The house is associated with Bert and John Hobbins, who lived here in the late 1890s, along with John's wife. Bert Hobbins was a clerk at Wellington & Co., and John was a clerk at Milor & Co. By 1903, Jesse Marvin, a sawyer, was living in this house. By 1928, William Behm was the owner.
