= Petoskey Downtown Historic District =

Historic district in Michigan, United States

- U.S. National Register of Historic Places
- U.S. Historic district
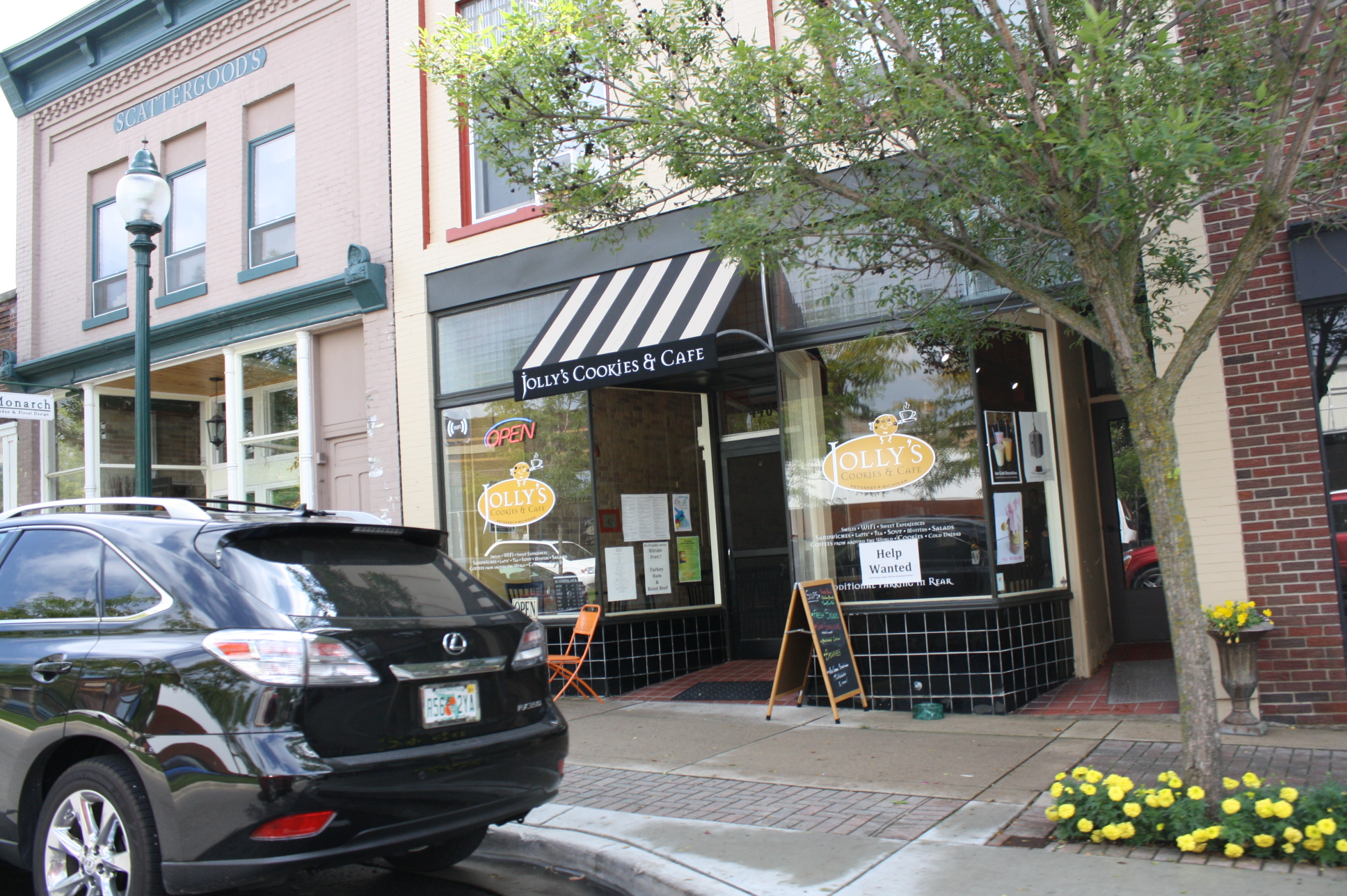
- East Mitchell Street.

- Location within Michigan Location within the United States
- Interactive map
- Location: Roughly bounded by Rose, Division, Michigan, and Petoskey, Petoskey, Michigan
- Coordinates: 45°22′30″N 84°57′19″W
- Area: 27.3 acres (11.0 ha)
- Architectural style: Classical Revival, Italianate, Queen Anne
- MPS: Petoskey MRA
- NRHP reference No.: 86002048
- Added to NRHP: November 12, 1986

The Petoskey Downtown Historic District is a commercial historic district, roughly bounded by Rose, Division, Michigan, and Petoskey streets in Petoskey, Michigan. It was listed on the National Register of Historic Places in 1986.

== History ==
In the 1850s, both a Presbyterian and a Catholic mission were established near modern-day Petoskey to minister to the Odawa residents of the area. By the 1860s, more European residents moved into Petoskey, and pioneer Hazen Ingalls constructed a dock for shipping and built the first store in what is now downtown Petoskey. In 1874, the Grand Rapids and Indiana Railroad began service to Petoskey, and the area soon grew immensely. The area already had three hotels by 1875. The village of Petoskey was incorporated in 1879; at that time a number of brick commercial structures began to be constructed in the downtown area.

Construction continued through the turn of the century, and construction of small scale commercial structures continued into the 1940s.

== Description ==
The Petoskey Downtown Historic District consists of 102 commercial properties and two institutional structures, located along 10 blocks in Petoskey's business district, primarily along East Mitchell and Howard streets. The contributing structures range in date from 1879 to the 1920s. The old tracks from the Grand Rapids and Indiana Railroad run diagonally through the district, and open land bordering the track is landscaped as a park. At its north end, the district includes the old Grand Rapids and Indiana Railroad Depot and the Perry Hotel, both reminders of the early tourism history of the city.

The majority of the structures in the district are commercial in nature, and can be grouped by significant uses and architectural styles:

- Residential-type commercial properties (319–331 Bay and 110–121 Howard): The two blocks at the northwestern edge of the district (the 300 block of Bay and 100 block of Howard) contain small residential-type commercial structures. Some serve as boarding houses, and others have been converted from residential to commercial use.
- Classical Revival structures (300 & 415 Howard; 307–09, 407, and 452 East Lake; 100 Lewis; 307, 408, & 447 East Mitchell): A number of structures exhibit Classical Revival architectural styling. The most distinctive is the c. 1890 First State Bank at 300 Howard, in part because of its prominent corner location and its cohesive facade with a prominent Doric portico. Other Classical Revival buildings include the 1902 Matthew Pietrowitcz building at 415 Howard, the 1907 G&A building at 307-09 East Lake, and the c. 1917 Petoskey Cigar Company building at 407 East Lake. Each of these buildings have upper story arches unifying the Classical design. The 1899 Perry Hotel at 100 Lewis, the first brick hotel in the city, exudes an impressive monumental quality due to its prominent Doric entrance.
- Italianate "Commercial Palaces" (329–31 & 401–03 East Lake; 320 & 412 East Mitchell): These structures include the 1879 Central Drug Store at 401–03 East Lake, the first brick building constructed in the district. The structures incorporate iron elements such as window hood and cornices which were marketed after the Civil War.
- Queen Anne structures (307, 310–12, & 419 Howard): The building at 307 Howard had second story oriel windows and detailed brickwork that is characteristically Queen Anne in style. The building at 310–12 Howard includes strong Classical Revival elements, and the 1893 Schilling building at 419 Howard contains strong Romanesque Revival details.
- Spanish Mission (105 Lewis and 210 Howard): The 1899 depot at 105 Lewis and the commercial building at 210 Howard have characteristic stepped gables and parapets of the Spanish Mission style.

== Gallery ==
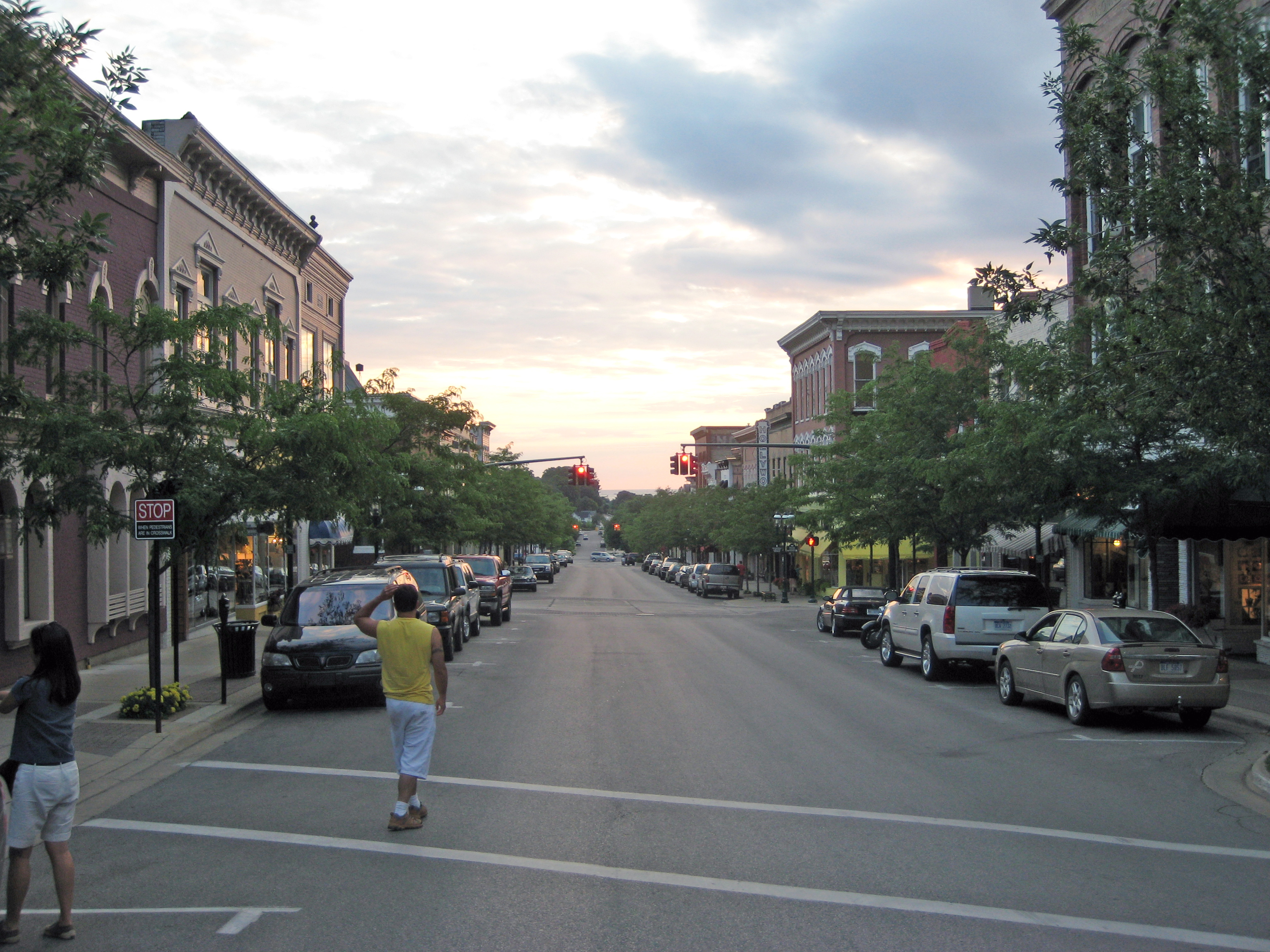
Petoskey, Lake St. looking west toward Howard, 2008

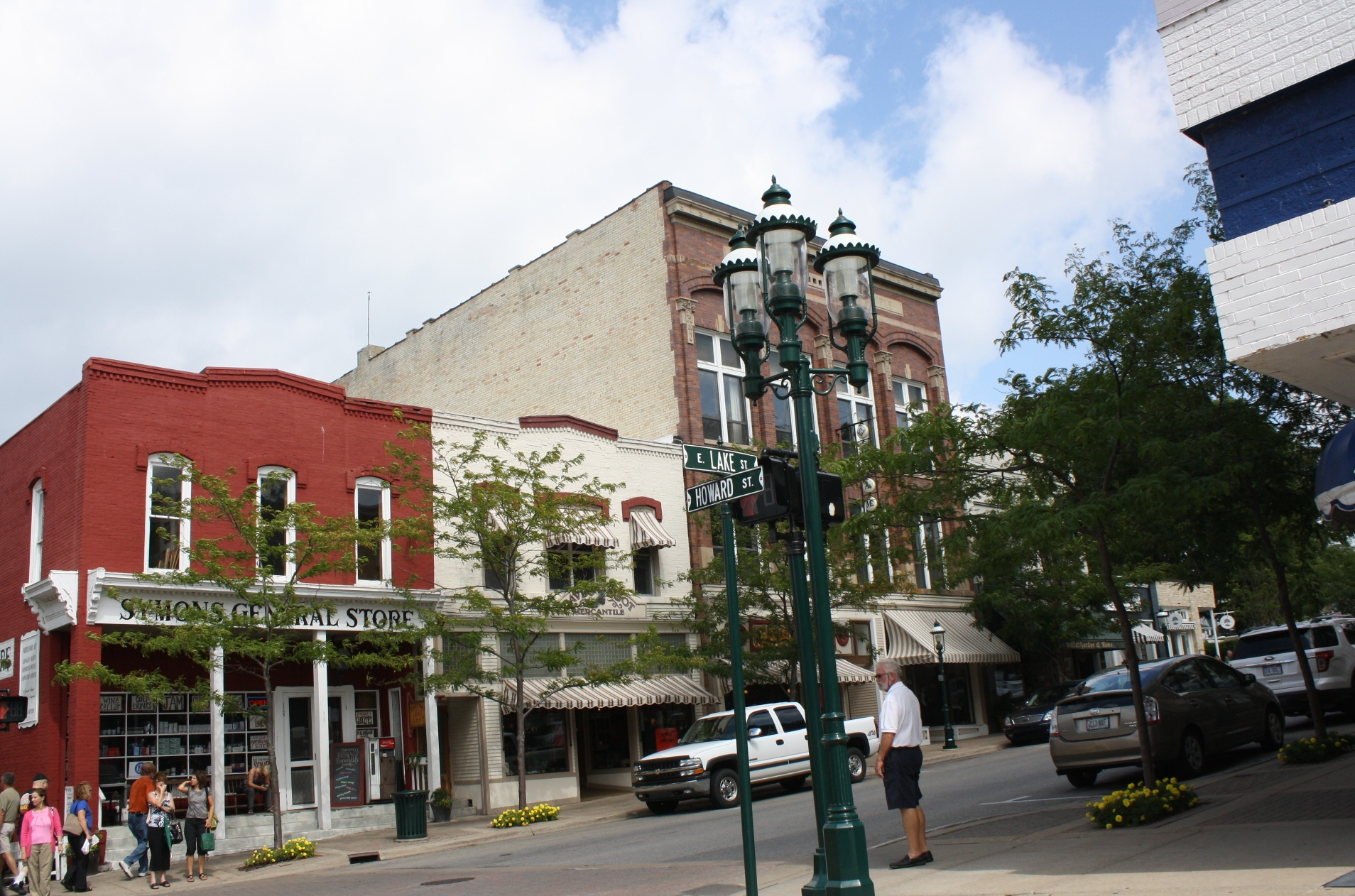
Lake and Howard

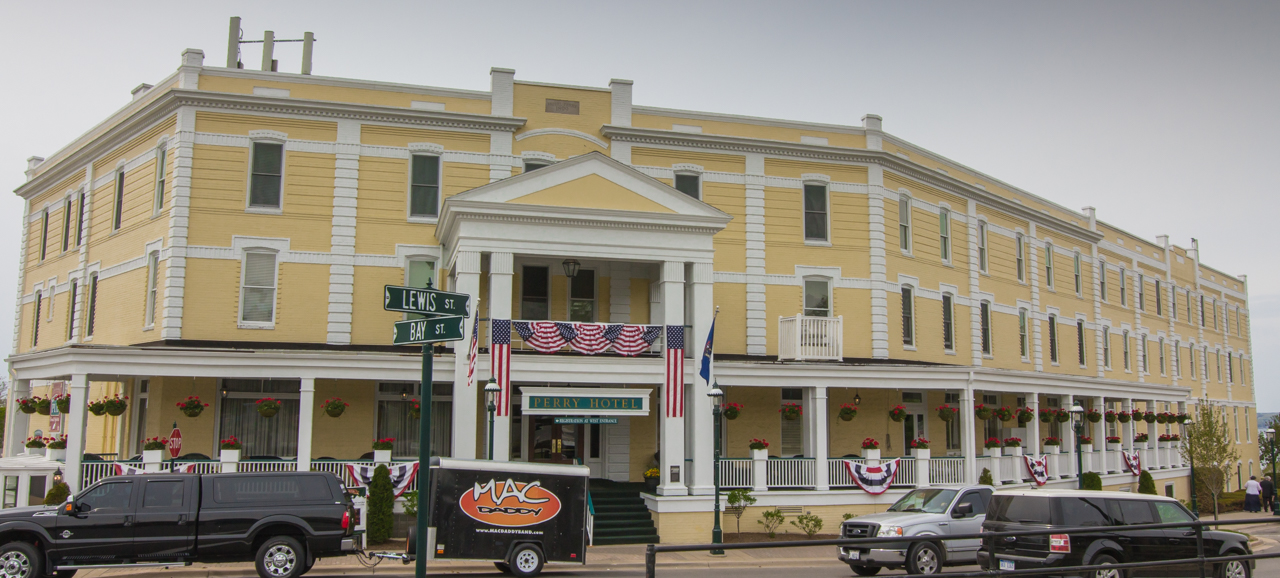
Perry's Hotel
