= Petoskey Grocery Company Building =

Historic place in Michigan, United States

- U.S. National Register of Historic Places
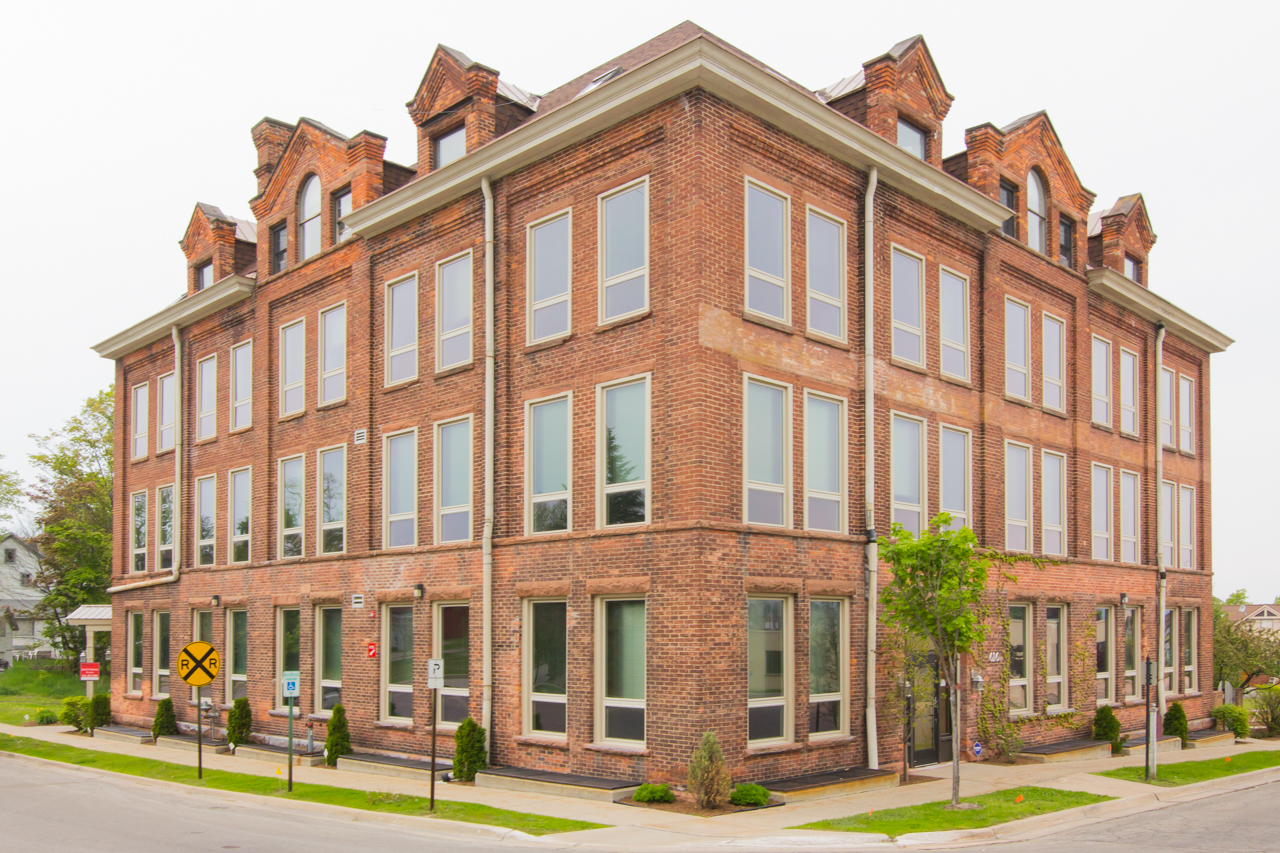

- Location within Michigan Location within the United States
- Interactive map
- Location: 616 Petoskey St., Petoskey, Michigan
- Coordinates: 45°22′17″N 84°57′25″W
- Area: 0.3 acres (0.12 ha)
- Architectural style: Queen Anne
- MPS: Petoskey MRA
- NRHP reference No.: 86002051
- Added to NRHP: September 10, 1986

The Petoskey Grocery Company Building, also known as the George T. Zipp Lumber Company Building, is a commercial building located at 616 Petoskey Street in Petoskey, Michigan. It was added to the National Register of Historic Places in 1986.

The Zipp Lumber Company Building is a three-story brick Queen Anne commercial structure built on a trapezoidal plan, with pedimented dormers and a hipped roof. The trapezoidal plan accommodates the irregular lot adjacent to the railroad tracks. The walls are paneled to simulate pilasters. Windows are one-over-one wood framed units.

The building was first occupied by the Petoskey Grocery Company, which was incorporated in 1900. In 1917, the George T. Zipp Lumber Company moved into the building. Zipp Lumber occupied the building for many years. After they vacated the building, it was refurbished into the Emmet County Professional Office Building.
