= Seventh Day Adventist Church (Petoskey, Michigan) =

Historic church in Michigan, United States

- U.S. National Register of Historic Places
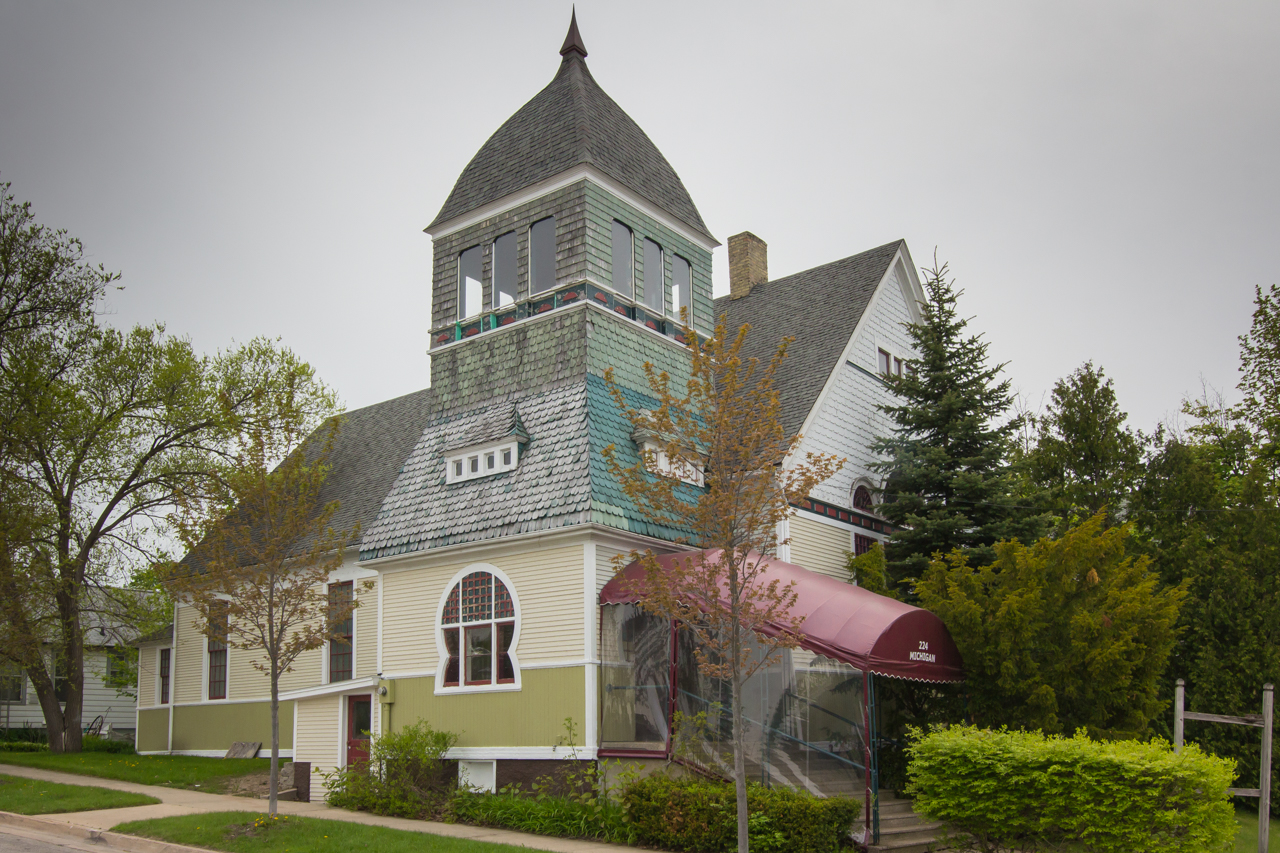

- Location within Michigan Location within the United States
- Interactive map
- Location: 224 Michigan St., Petoskey, Michigan
- Coordinates: 45°22′21″N 84°57′26″W
- Area: 0.3 acres (0.12 ha)
- Built: 1891
- Architectural style: Queen Anne
- MPS: Petoskey MRA
- NRHP reference No.: 86002077
- Added to NRHP: September 10, 1986

The historic building located at 224 Michigan Street in Petoskey, Michigan was originally a place of worship owned by the Seventh-day Adventist Church. It was listed in the National Register of Historic Places in 1986.

== History ==
The building was originally built in 1891 as a Seventh-day Adventist church. The Adventist congregation occupied the building for many years; it was later sold to the Church of Jesus Christ of Latter-day Saints. The building now houses the S. Garrett Beck Law Offices.

== Description ==
The historic site is a two-story frame Queen Anne structure with a front-gable roof. A single-story wing is attached to the rear of the building. The front facade has a large, elaborate window treatment. The first floor is sheathed with narrow clapboard, while the gable above is sheathed with wood singles. The building has an entrance tower at one end topped with an onion-like dome. The entrance itself is through a horseshoe-shaped surround in the base of the tower.
