= St. Francis Solanus Mission =

- U.S. National Register of Historic Places
- Michigan State Historic Site
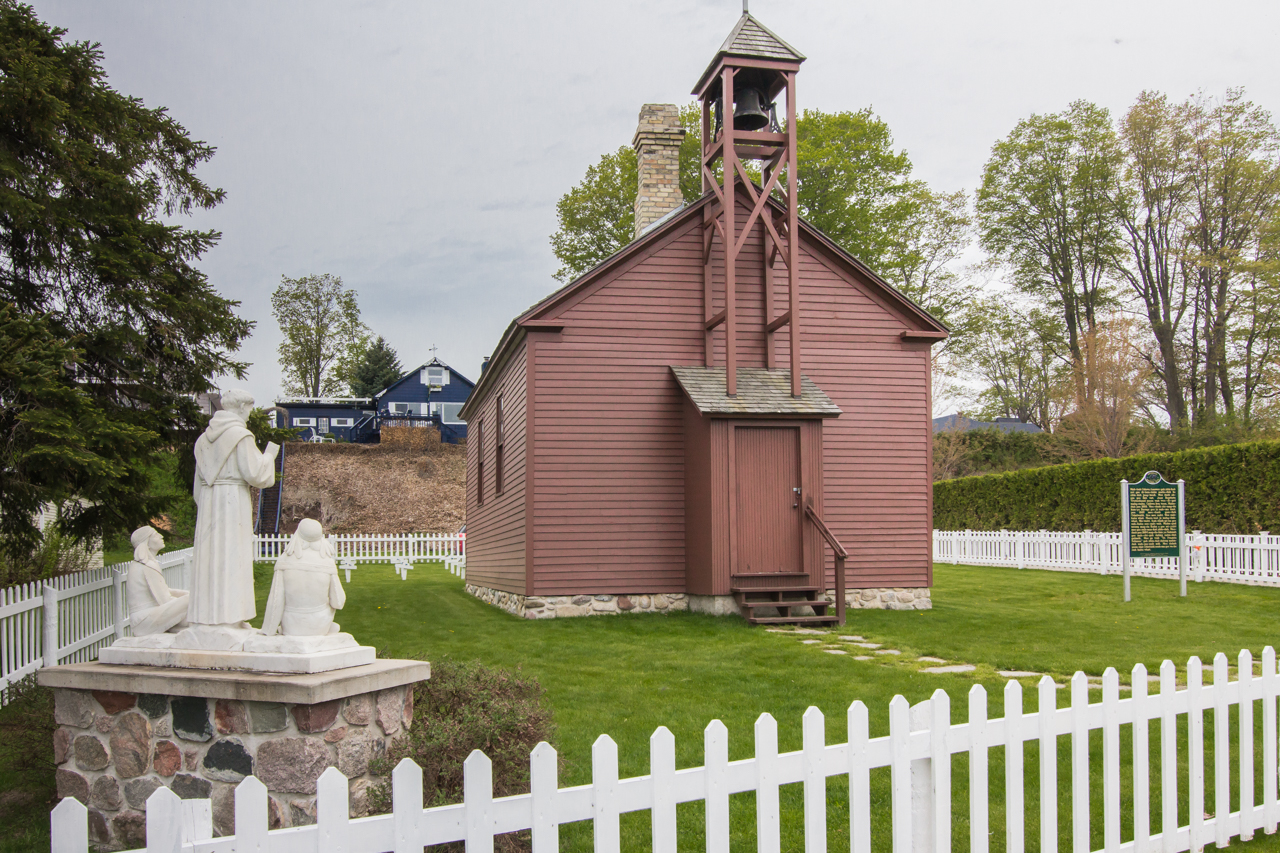

- Location within Michigan Location within the United States
- Interactive map
- Location: W. Lake St., Petoskey, Michigan
- Coordinates: 45°22′32″N 84°58′3″W
- Area: 1 acre (0.40 ha)
- Built: 1860
- Built by: Jean Baptiste Trotochard
- NRHP reference No.: 72000614
- Added to NRHP: March 16, 1972

St. Francis Solanus Mission is a historic mission on W. Lake Street in Petoskey, Michigan. It is the only existing building in the Arbre Croche district dating from the time of Bishop Frederic Baraga, and is the oldest building still standing in Petoskey, as well as one of the oldest in northern lower Michigan. The mission was added to the National Register of Historic Places in 1972.

== History ==
In 1856, Father Lawrence Lautishar attempted to construct a church near this site, but ran into resistance from Protestant missionaries who settled in the area in 1852. Bishop Frederic Baraga requested Lautishar halt construction, and in 1858, Baraga and Indian agent A.W. Fitch effected a compromise between the factions and a site farther from the Protestant mission was agreed upon. In 1859, a carpenter, Jean Baptiste Trotochard, donated an acre of land on which to locate the mission church. Baraga accepted the offer and engaged Trotochard to construct a church. The new church was blessed by Bishop Baraga on July 23, 1860. Native Americans worshipped at this church until 1896.

Petoskey's St. Francis Xavier Church oversees the Solanus property. The church was completely restored in 2008. It is open on select Sundays during the tourist season, and a Mass is celebrated annually in the church on July 14.

== Description ==
The St. Francis Solanus Mission is a small frame gable roofed church measuring 30 feet by 20 feet. Two six-over-six windows are located on each side of the church. An extension on the front contains a skeletal bell tower topped with a Latin cross, and an enclosed entryway with a shed roof. A picket fence surrounds the mission.

The interior of the church is simple, containing four-inch-wide board seats without backs.

== See also ==
- List of churches in the Roman Catholic Diocese of Gaylord
