= Chief Andrew J. Blackbird House =

Historic house in Michigan, United States

- U.S. National Register of Historic Places
- Michigan State Historic Site
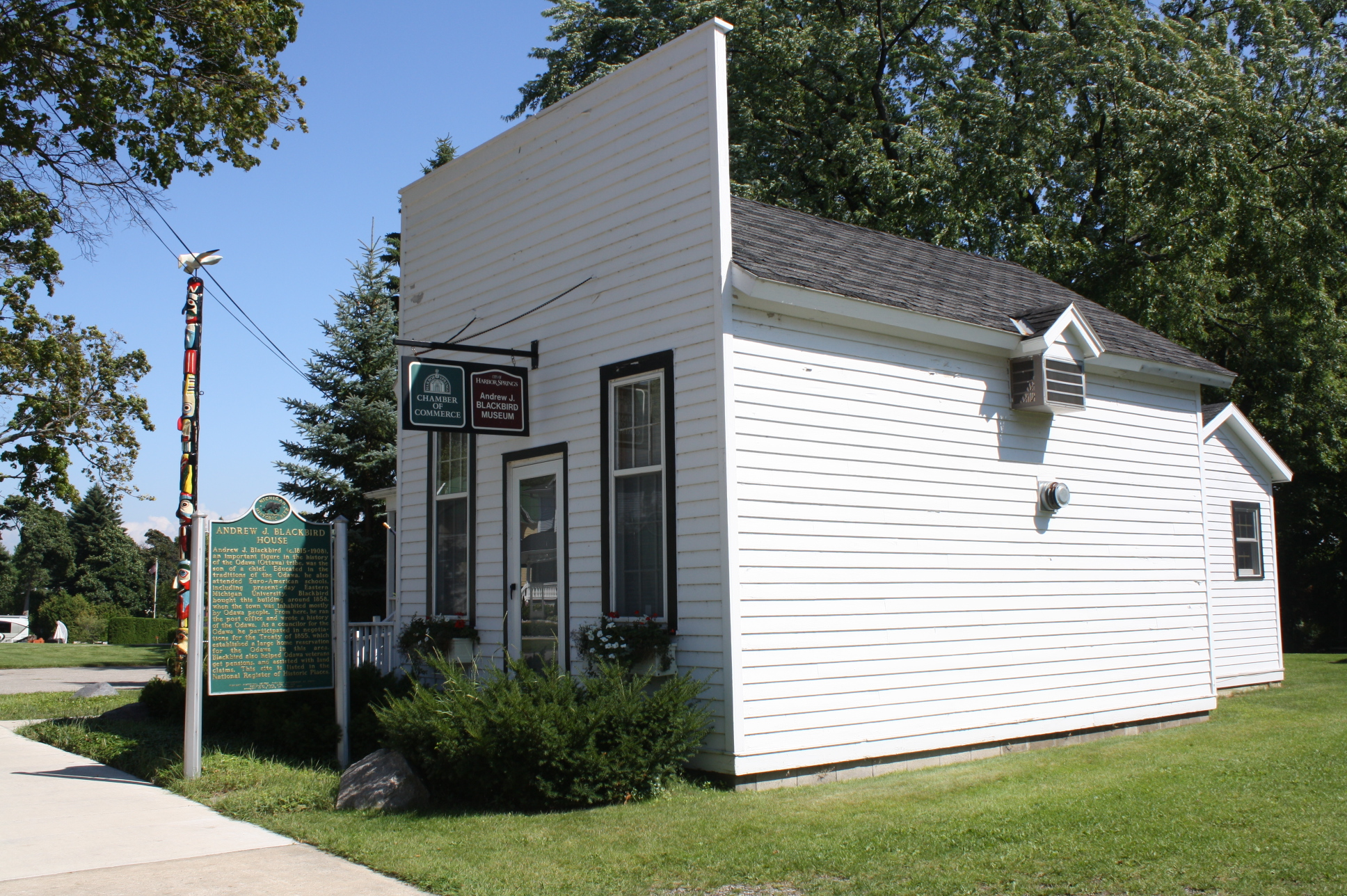
- Chief Andrew J Blackbird House (post office section)

- Location within Michigan Location within the United States
- Interactive map
- Location: 368 E. Main St., Harbor Springs, Michigan
- Coordinates: 45°25′49″N 84°59′5″W
- Area: 1 acre (0.40 ha)
- NRHP reference No.: 72000611
- Added to NRHP: April 14, 1972

The Chief Andrew J. Blackbird House, also known as the Andrew J. Blackbird Museum, is located at 368 East Main Street in Harbor Springs, Michigan. Now a museum, it was built as the home of the Chief Andrew Blackbird family. The house was placed on the National Register of Historic Places in 1972, and currently operates as a museum of American Indian artifacts.

== History ==
Chief Andrew Blackbird was an Odawa (Ottawa) tribe leader, historian, and proponent of Indian civil rights. He was author of the 1887 book, History of the Ottawa and Chippewa Indians of Michigan. He was born in about 1815, and as an adult served in a number of government posts, including being appointed US interpreter for the Mackinac Agency in 1861 and appointed postmaster of Little Traverse (now Harbor Springs) in 1869.

Blackbird purchased this house in about 1858 for the use of his family. When he was appointed postmaster, the house doubled as the post office, and residents picked up their mail in the Blackbird kitchen. As the town grew and the salary of the postmaster increased, new residents disliked the arrangement, and in 1873 petitioned to have Blackbird removed. In response, Blackbird built an addition to his house to serve as the post office. However, Blackbird was removed as postmaster in 1877. Blackbird remained in the house until his death in 1908.

Blackbird's wife, Elizabeth, continued to live in the house until her death in 1920. Her two sons lived there until their deaths, the last in 1947. It was then sold to the Michigan Indian Foundation, and opened as a local museum in 1948. The City of Harbor Springs purchased the house in 1964, with the stipulation that it be used an Indian museum. It now operates as a museum of American Indian artifacts.

== Description ==
The Chief Andrew Blackbird House is constructed in two connected parts, both 1 1/2-story wood-frame buildings clad with white-painted wooden clapboard siding. The original 1860 section has a porch extending across the front, the entry door opens into the kitchen. The connected early 1870s section served as a post office, and has a false front above the entrance. This section still contains some of the original mailboxes. Each section has a brick chimney.
