= Petoskey Public Works Utility Building =

- U.S. National Register of Historic Places
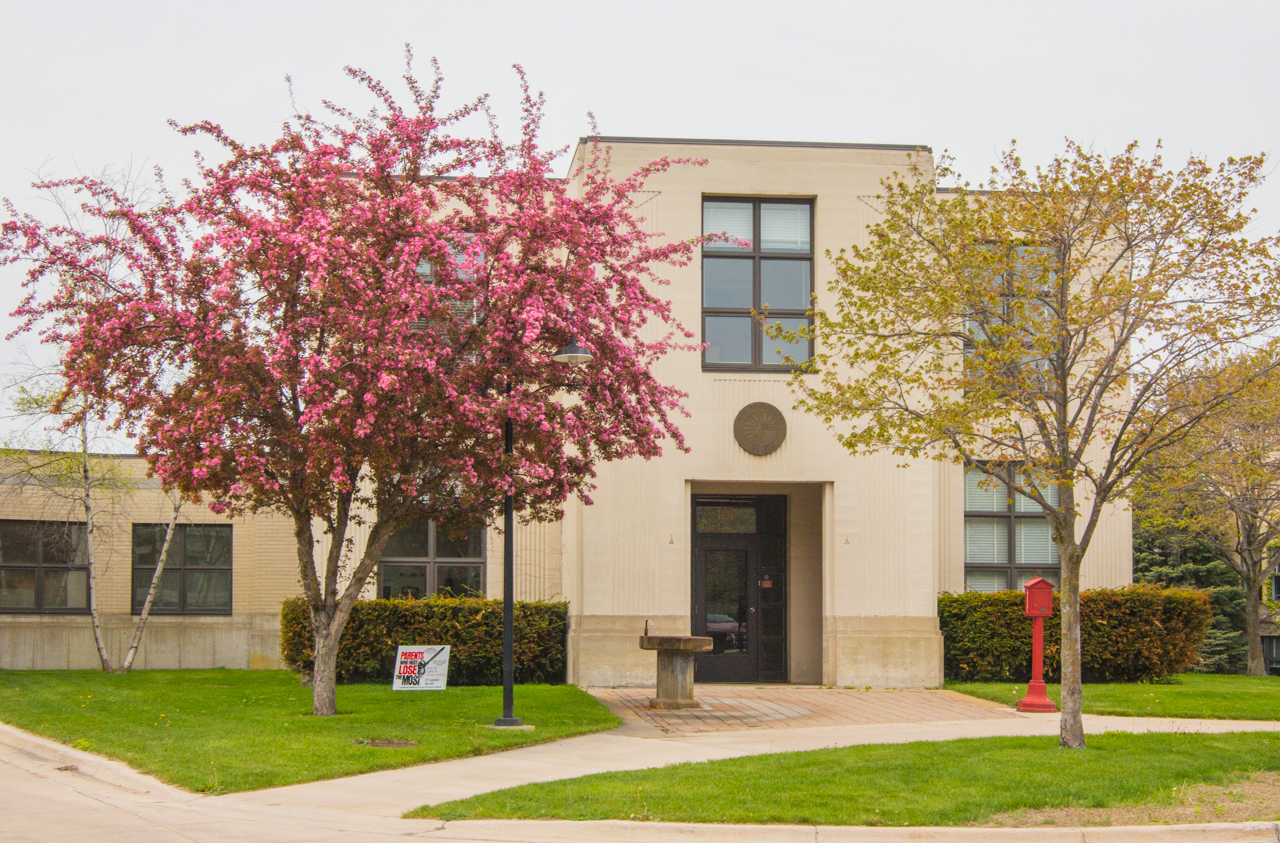

- Location within Michigan Location within the United States
- Interactive map
- Location: 106 W. Lake St., Petoskey, Michigan
- Coordinates: 45°22′32″N 84°57′32″W
- Area: 0.5 acres (0.20 ha)
- Built: 1937
- Architectural style: Moderne
- MPS: Petoskey MRA
- NRHP reference No.: 86002056
- Added to NRHP: September 13, 1986

The Petoskey Public Works Utility Building, is a utility building located at 106 West Lake Street in Petoskey, Michigan. It was added to the National Register of Historic Places in 1986.

The Petoskey Public Works Utility Building is a two-story concrete Moderne structure with metal-framed windows. A single-story addition extends to one side at the rear of the building. The entry bay protrudes forward. The exterior walls are grooved, referencing the fluting seen in classical piers.

The Petoskey Public Works Utility Building was constructed in 1937, replacing another facility that had stood on the site for many years. The building is part of a long-time commitment by the city to generate electrical power for the community.
