= Pellston High School =

Pellston Middle/High School
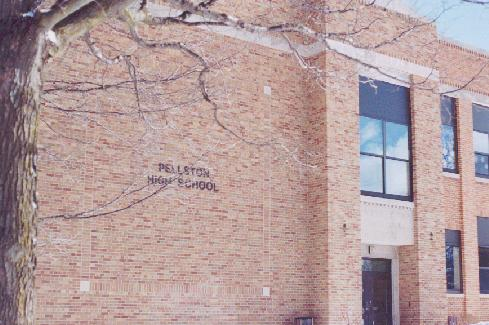

Location
- 172 Park Street; Pellston, Michigan 49769; United States
- 45°33′11″N 84°46′53″W

Information
- Opened: 1935
- School district: Pellston Public Schools
- Superintendent: Stephen Seelye
- Principal: Chris Schlappi
- Teaching staff: 21.92 (on a FTE basis)
- Grades: 6–12
- Enrollment: 258 (2024-2025)
- Student to teacher ratio: 11.77
- Campus type: Rural/Remote
- Colors: Brown and Gold
- Nickname: Hornets
- Website: www.pellstonschools.org

Pellston Middle/High School is a combined middle and high school in Pellston, Michigan, with a shared principal overseeing grades 6–12 in the Pellston Public Schools district. The school serves the Northwest Michigan area, including the townships of Bliss, Burt Lake, Carp Lake, Center, Hebron, Maple River, McKinley, Munro, Pleasantview, Readmond, and Wawatam. The school received a composite grade of B from the Michigan Department of Education, based on several measures of the school's performance for the 2009–2010 school year.

== Demographics ==
The demographic breakdown of the 393 students enrolled for 2013-2014 was:

- Male - 46.8%
- Female - 53.2%
- Native American/Alaskan - 5.4%
- Asian/Pacific islanders - 0.5%
- Black - 0.5%
- Hispanic - 1.0%
- White - 79.4%
- Multiracial - 13.2%

55.2% of the students were eligible for free or reduced price lunch. The school is also recognized as a Title I school under the Elementary and Secondary Education Act (ESEA), and receives federal funding due to the high percentage of low-income students enrolled at the school.

== Attendance boundary ==
Most of the school district, and therefore the high school attendance boundary, is in Emmet County. There it includes Pellston, Carp Lake, Levering, and portions of Brutus. Townships included are all of Bliss, Center, and McKinley, and sections of Carp Lake, Maple River, Pleasantview, Readmond, and Wawatam. Portions of the district are in Cheboygan County. There it includes Burt Township and portions of Hebron Township and Munro Township.

== Hornet Health Center ==
The Michigan Department of Community Health, in partnership with the Michigan Department of Education, provides grant funds to the Health Department of Northwest Michigan to operate the Hornet Health Center at the school. The Hornet Health Center provides primary care and counseling services to all youth between the ages of 5–21 regardless of income or health insurance coverage. The center's mission is, "to improve the health and well being of young people in Emmet County".

== Athletic programs ==
Pellston Middle/High School is considered a Class D school in the Ski Valley Conference. It offers the following athletic programs:

- Girls
  - Basketball
  - Softball
  - Track
  - Volleyball
  - Golf
  - Cross Country
- Boys
  - Basketball
  - Baseball
  - Track
  - Football
  - Golf
  - Cross Country
