= Pellston Public Schools =

School district in Michigan

Address
- 172 Park Street Pellston, Emmet County, Michigan, 49769; United States
- Coordinates: 45°33′10″N 84°46′48″W

District information
- Grades: PreKindergarten–12
- Superintendent: Stephen Seelye
- Schools: 2
- Budget: $8,867,000 2022–2023 expenditures
- NCES District ID: 2627720

Students and staff
- Students: 479 (2024–2025)
- Teachers: 41.92 (on an FTE basis) (2024–2025)
- Staff: 101.25 FTE (2024–2025)
- Student–teacher ratio: 11.43 (2024–2025)
- District mascot: Hornets
- Colors: Brown and gold

Other information
- Website: www.pellstonschools.org

Pickford Public Schools is a public school district in Northern Michigan. Most of the district is in Emmet County. There it includes Pellston, Carp Lake, Levering, and portions of Brutus. Townships included are all of Bliss, Center, and McKinley, and sections of Carp Lake, Maple River, Pleasantview, Readmond, and Wawatam. Portions of the district are in Cheboygan County. There it includes Burt Township and portions of Hebron Township and Munro Township.

== History ==
On February 6, 1932, Pellston's schools burned down. A ten-room school, still currently in use, was built to replace it.

Pellston Elementary's open house and dedication was held on November 7, 1969. The building's architecture firm was Manson, Jackson and Kane of Lansing.

== Schools ==
Schools in Pellston Public Schools District district
School	Address	Notes
Pellston Middle/High School	172 N Park Street, Pellston	Grades 6–12
Pellston Elementary	114 Zipf Street, Pellston	Grades PreK-5
