= Chris Hass =

American basketball player

No. 15 – ČEZ Nymburk
- Position: Shooting guard
- League: Czech Republic NBL

Personal information
- Born: February 19, 1994 (age 32) Pellston, Michigan
- Listed height: 6 ft 5 in (1.96 m)
- Listed weight: 189 lb (86 kg)

Career information
- High school: Pellston (Pellston, Michigan)
- College: Bucknell (2012–2016)
- NBA draft: 2016: undrafted
- Playing career: 2016–present

Career history
- 2016–present: ČEZ Basketball Nymburk

Career highlights
- 2× First-team All-Patriot League (2015, 2016); Third-team All-Patriot League (2014)

Chris Hass (born February 19, 1994) is an American professional basketball player for ČEZ Basketball Nymburk in the Czech Republic National Basketball League. Hass played his college basketball at Bucknell University for the Bucknell Bison of the Patriot League.

On June 1, 2017 Hass signed a one-year deal with ČEZ Nymburk a basketball club based in the Czech Republic. In 8 games Hass averaged 8.9 points, 1.7 rebounds and 1.4 assists per game in his first professional season.
