= Delta County Airport =

Airport in Michigan, U.S.

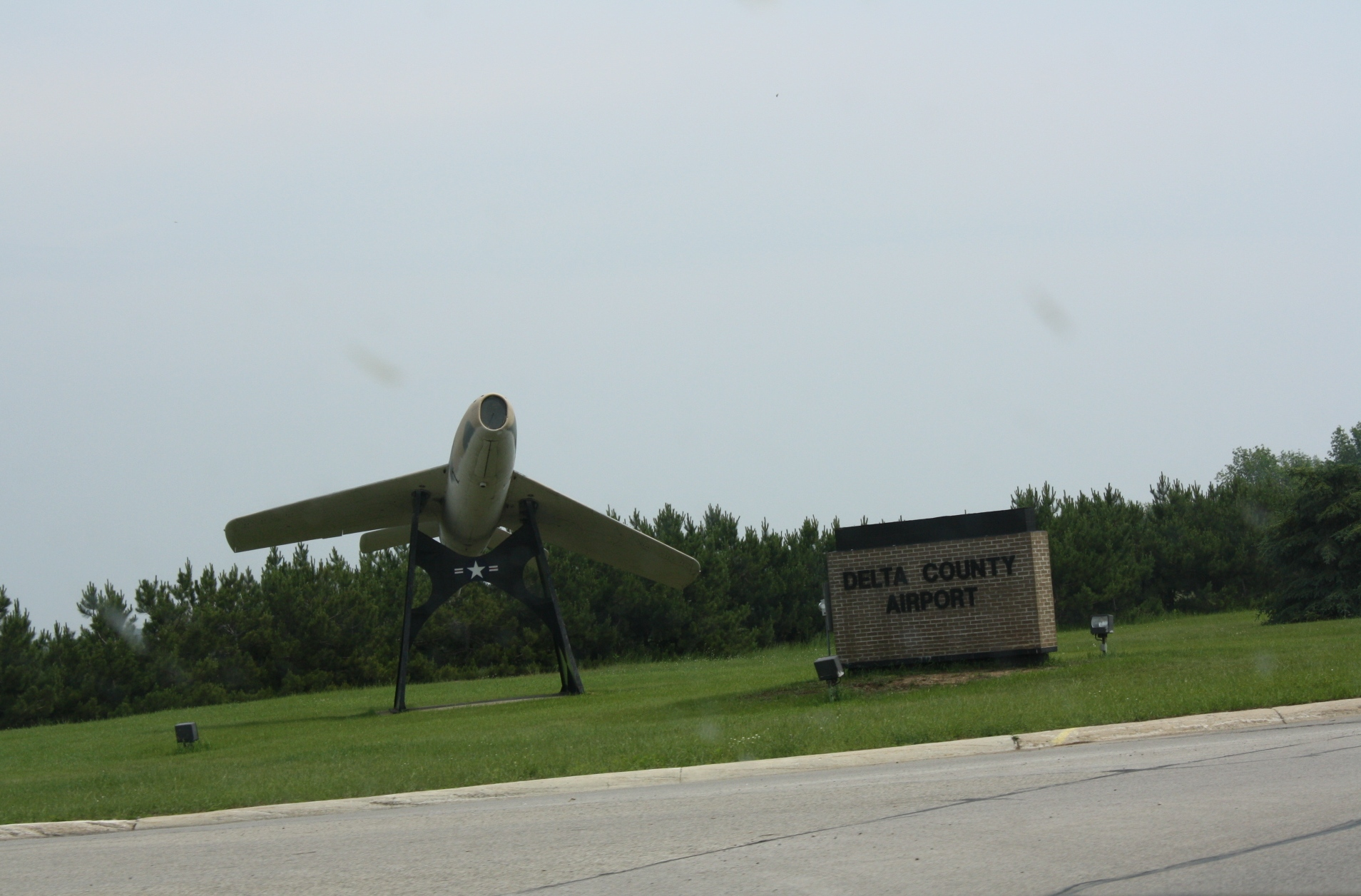
- An F-84F at the entrance along M-35 Highway
- IATA: ESC; ICAO: KESC; FAA LID: ESC

Summary
- Airport type: Public
- Owner: Delta County
- Serves: Escanaba, Michigan
- Opened: April 1940
- Elevation AMSL: 609 ft (186 m)
- Coordinates: 45°43′22″N 087°05′37″W
- Website: flyesc.com

Map
- Location of airport in Michigan ESC (the United States)

Runways
Direction	Length		Surface
Direction	ft	m	Surface
10/28	6,498	1,981	Asphalt
1/19	5,016	1,529	Asphalt

Statistics (12 months ending September 2025 ^{except where noted})
- Passenger volume: 34,520
- Departing passengers: 17,670
- Scheduled flights: 891
- Cargo (lb.): 457k
- Aircraft operations (2022): 6,360
- Based aircraft (2023): 1
- Sources: Federal Aviation Administration, Michigan DOT

Delta County Airport (IATA: ESC, ICAO: KESC, FAA LID: ESC) is a county-owned public-use airport located two nautical miles (3.7 km; 2.3 mi) southwest of the central business district of Escanaba, a city in Delta County, Michigan, United States. It offers limited commercial service, which is subsidized by the Essential Air Service program.

It is included in the Federal Aviation Administration (FAA) National Plan of Integrated Airport Systems for 2021–2025, in which it is categorized as a non-hub primary commercial service facility.

The airport received $1 million from the US Department of Transportation in 2020 as part of the CARES Act to help mitigate the effects of the COVID-19 pandemic.

== Facilities and aircraft ==
Delta County Airport covers an area of 944 acres (382 ha) at an elevation of 609.1 feet (186 m) above mean sea level. It has two asphalt paved runways: primary runway 10/28 measures 6,498 by 150 feet (1,981 by 46 m), and crosswind runway 1/19 measures 5,016 by 100 feet (1,529 by 30 m).

For the 12-month period ending December 31, 2022, the airport had 6,360 aircraft operations, an average of 17 per day: 68% general aviation, 27% air taxi, 5% scheduled commercial, and less than 1% military. In November 2023, there was 1 aircraft based at this airport: 1 ultra-light.

The airport operates a fixed-base operator for general aviation use offering fuel, general maintenance, aircraft parking, courtesy and rental cars, and a crew lounge.

A Republic F-84F is on display at the airport's entrance.

== Airlines and destinations ==
=== Passenger ===
SkyWest Airlines operates flights on behalf of Delta Air Lines in Escanaba. The airport sees daily services both to Detroit and Minneapolis. The airline created controversy when, citing staffing shortages, it operated flights to Detroit as a "tag flight" with a stop in Pellston. These services only lasted one month before the airline returned to nonstop flights. However, another change was announced in December 2022, when the airline announced plans to operate tag flights between Escanaba and Iron Mountain en route to one of their hubs.

Airlines	Destinations
Delta Connection	Detroit, Minneapolis/St Paul

Destinations map
Destinations from Delta County Airport
Red = Year-round destination
Green = Seasonal destination
Blue = Future destination

== Accidents and incidents ==
- On November 3, 2015, a Glimn Kitfox 2-3 impacted terrain while attempting a forced landing at Delta County Airport. The aircraft's propeller had stopped rotating inflight, but the engine was still producing enough power to remain in the air. The probable cause of the accident was found to be the aircraft owner's inadequate maintenance and servicing of the propeller gearbox, resulting in oil starvation, gearbox failure, and a subsequent loss of propeller thrust. A contributing failure was the aircraft's low altitude, which made it impossible to reach the runway in time. The private pilot in control, a prospective buyer of the aircraft, received minor injuries.
- On August 2, 2018, a Gerald Dan Coppock homebuilt experimental aircraft sustained substantial damage during a runway excursion following loss of directional control while landing at Escanaba. The pilot, who was uninjured, reported the aircraft veered left once the tailwheel contacted the runway; both wingtips subsequently contacted the runway surface, and the airplane ground-looped. The right steering cable chain was later found to be broken and hanging out of the tailwheel, but it is undetermined whether the cable break occurred prior to or during the accident sequence.

== See also ==
- List of airports in Michigan

== Other sources ==
- Essential Air Service documents (Docket OST-2003-15128) from the U.S. Department of Transportation:
  - Order 2004-4-3: selecting Skyway Airlines, Inc., d/b/a Midwest Connect, to provide subsidized essential air service at Escanaba, Michigan, at an annual subsidy rate of $290,952 for the period of August 5, 2003, through March 31, 2006.
  - Order 2006-6-23: re-selecting Skyway Airlines, Inc., d/b/a Midwest Connect, to provide subsidized essential air service (EAS) at Escanaba, Michigan, at an annual subsidy rate of $908,903 for the period April 1, 2006, through May 31, 2007.
  - Order 2007-3-21: selecting Great Lakes Aviation, Ltd. to provide subsidized essential air service at Iron Mountain/Kingsford, Michigan, Ironwood, Michigan/Ashland, Wisconsin, Manistee/Lundington, Michigan, and Escanaba, Michigan for the two-year period beginning when the carrier inaugurates full service. The annual subsidy rates will be set at: $797,885 for Iron Mountain/Kingsford, $799,779 for Ironwood/Ashland, $957,978 for Manistee/Ludington, and $617,415 for Escanaba.
  - Order 2008-1-13: selecting Mesaba Aviation, Inc., d/b/a Mesaba Airlines, operating as Northwest Airlink, utilizing 34-seat Saab 340 aircraft to provide subsidized EAS at Iron Mountain/Kingsford and Escanaba Michigan, at a combined annual subsidy rate of $2,251,767.
  - Order 2008-8-14: re-selecting Mesaba Aviation, Inc., d/b/a Mesaba Airlines, operating as Northwest Airlink, utilizing 34-seat Saab 340 aircraft to provide subsidized EAS at Iron Mountain/Kingsford and Escanaba Michigan, at a combined annual subsidy rate of $2,870,236, for a new two-year period, beginning August 15, 2008.
  - Order 2010-6-4: re-selecting Mesaba Aviation, Inc., d/b/a Mesaba Airlines, doing business as Delta Connection, utilizing 34-seat Saab 340 aircraft to provide subsidized essential air service (EAS) at Iron Mountain/Kingsford and Escanaba, Michigan, for a new two-year period, at a combined annual subsidy rate of $4,181,068.
  - Order 2012-4-10: selecting Delta Air Lines, Inc., to provide essential air service (EAS) at Chisholm/Hibbing, Minnesota, and Escanaba, Pellston, and Sault Ste. Marie, Michigan, for $2,517,770, $2,833,558, $1,055,361, and $1,676,136, respectively. At Pellston, the service is to consist of 12 nonstop round trips per week to Detroit in the off-peak, and 14 per week in the peak period. At Sault Ste. Marie, the service will be 13 round trips per week year round. At the remaining two communities, service is to consist of 12 nonstop round trips per week year round. All service is to be operated with 50-seat CRJ-200 aircraft.
