= Center Township, Michigan =

- Civil township
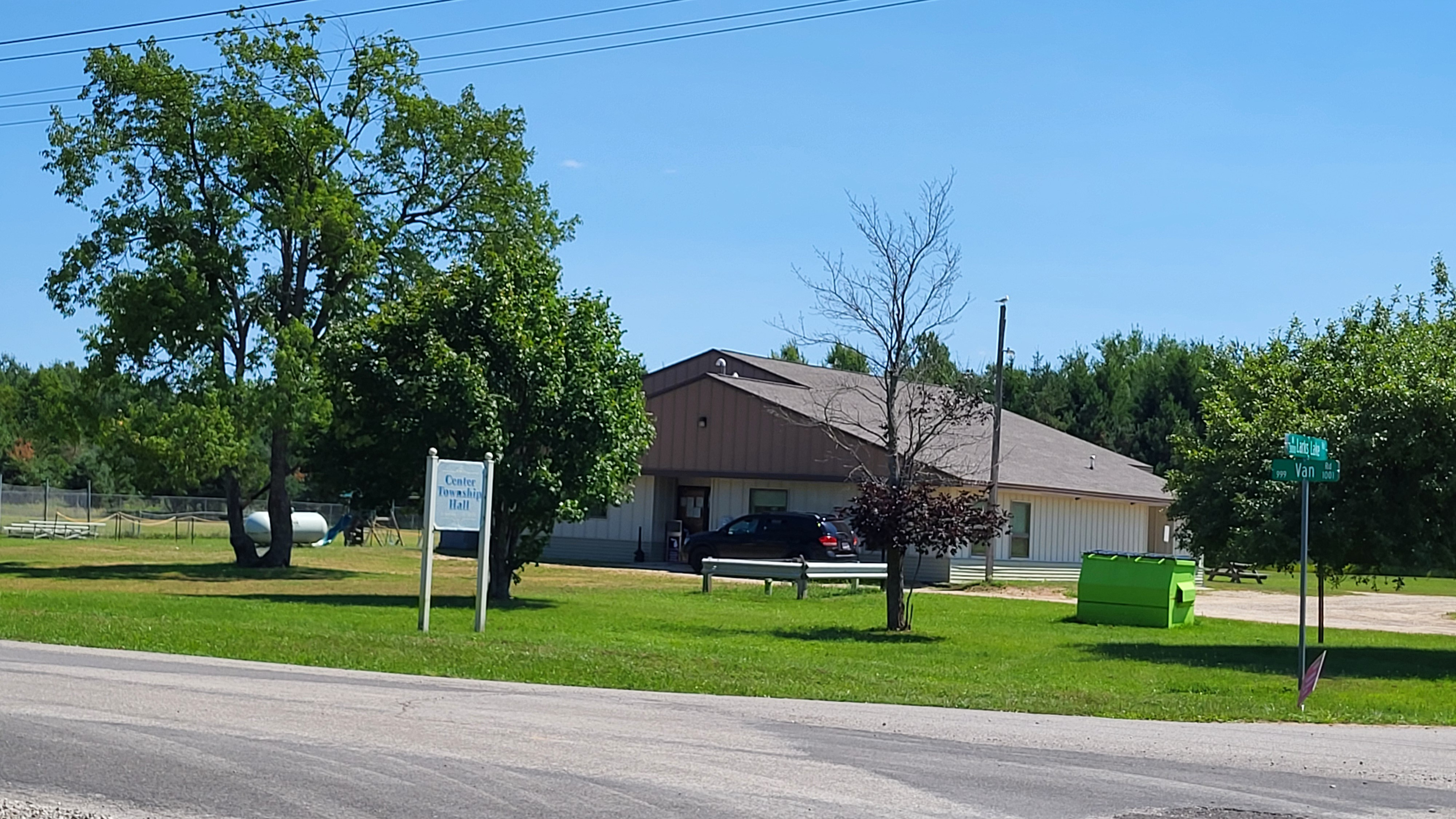
- Center Township Hall

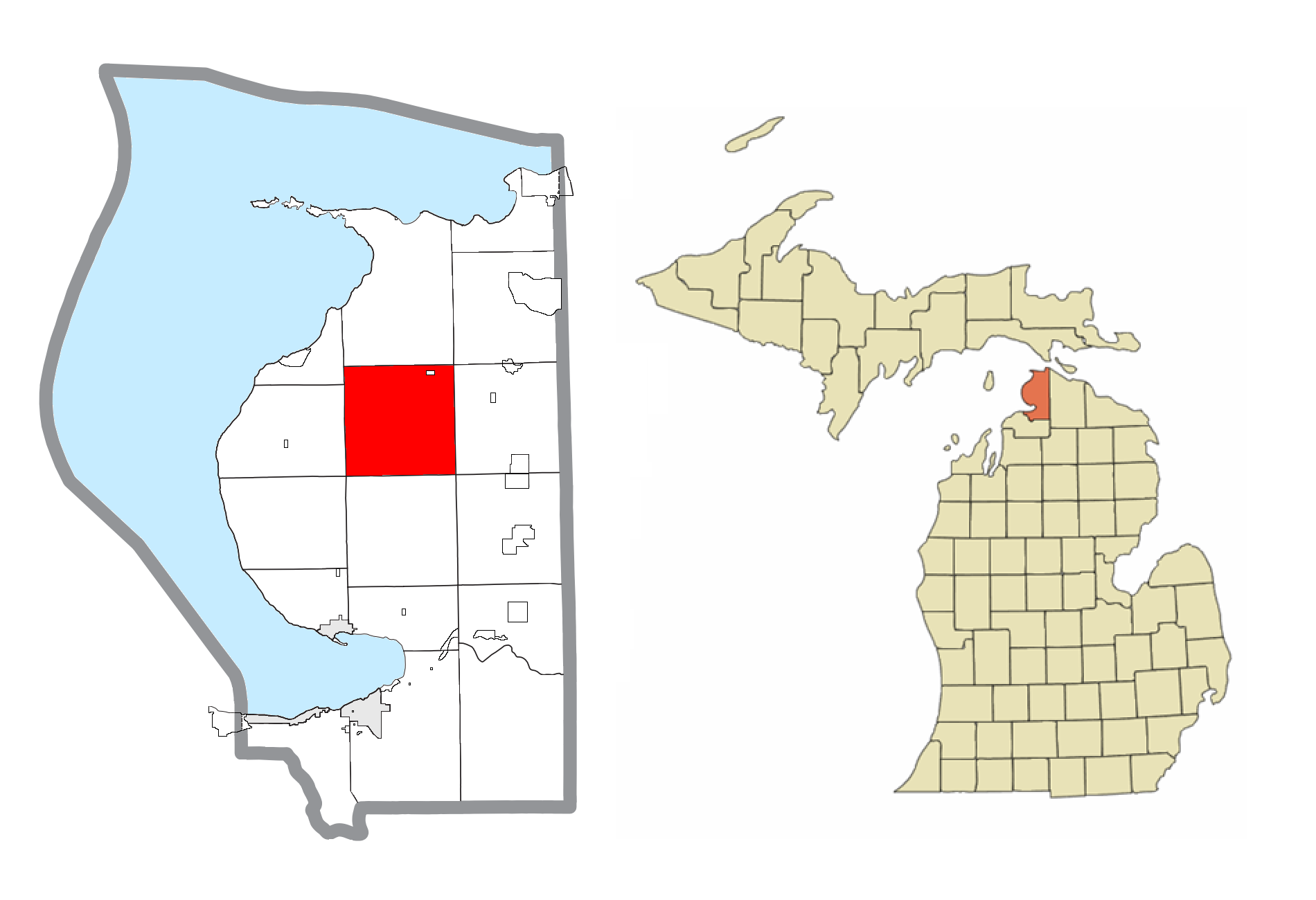
- Location within Emmet County

- Location within the state of Michigan Center Township (the United States)
- Coordinates: 45°35′50″N 84°55′12″W
- Country: United States
- State: Michigan
- County: Emmet

Government
  - Supervisor: Bill Hutto
  - Clerk: Constance Jordan

Area
  - Total: 35.26 sq mi (91.3 km^{2})
  - Land: 34.30 sq mi (88.8 km^{2})
  - Water: 0.96 sq mi (2.5 km^{2})
- Elevation: 735 ft (224 m)

Population (2020)
  - Total: 525
  - Density: 15.3/sq mi (5.91/km^{2})
- Time zone: UTC-5 (Eastern (EST))
  - Summer (DST): UTC-4 (EDT)
- ZIP Code: 49769 (Pellston); 49755 (Levering)
- Area code: 231
- FIPS code: 26-143000
- GNIS feature ID: 1626051
- Website: https://centertownshipmichigan.org/

Center Township is a civil township of Emmet County in the U.S. state of Michigan. The population was 525 at the 2020 census.

== Geography ==
According to the United States Census Bureau, the township has a total area of 35.26 square miles (91.32 km^{2}), of which 34.30 square miles (88.84 km^{2}) is land and 0.96 square miles (2.49 km^{2}) (2.72%) is water.

== Communities ==
- Ely is an unincorporated community in Center Township, which was established in 1876 and had a post office from 1879 until 1908.

== Demographics ==
As of the census of 2000, there were 499 people, 192 households, and 137 families residing in the township. The population density was 14.5 inhabitants per square mile (5.6/km^{2}). There were 301 housing units at an average density of 8.8 per square mile (3.4/km^{2}). The racial makeup of the township was 93.79% White, 2.81% Native American, and 3.41% from two or more races. Hispanic or Latino of any race were 1.40% of the population.

There were 192 households, out of which 37.0% had children under the age of 18 living with them, 55.7% were married couples living together, 9.4% had a female householder with no husband present, and 28.6% were non-families. 24.0% of all households were made up of individuals, and 5.2% had someone living alone who was 65 years of age or older. The average household size was 2.55 and the average family size was 3.05.

In the township the population was spread out, with 28.9% under the age of 18, 5.0% from 18 to 24, 26.5% from 25 to 44, 27.7% from 45 to 64, and 12.0% who were 65 years of age or older. The median age was 37 years. For every 100 females, there were 108.8 males. For every 100 females age 18 and over, there were 105.2 males.

The median income for a household in the township was $38,333, and the median income for a family was $45,556. Males had a median income of $36,375 versus $26,667 for females. The per capita income for the township was $16,201. About 2.9% of families and 6.9% of the population were below the poverty line, including 7.2% of those under age 18 and 11.4% of those age 65 or over.
