= Maple River Township, Michigan =

- Civil township
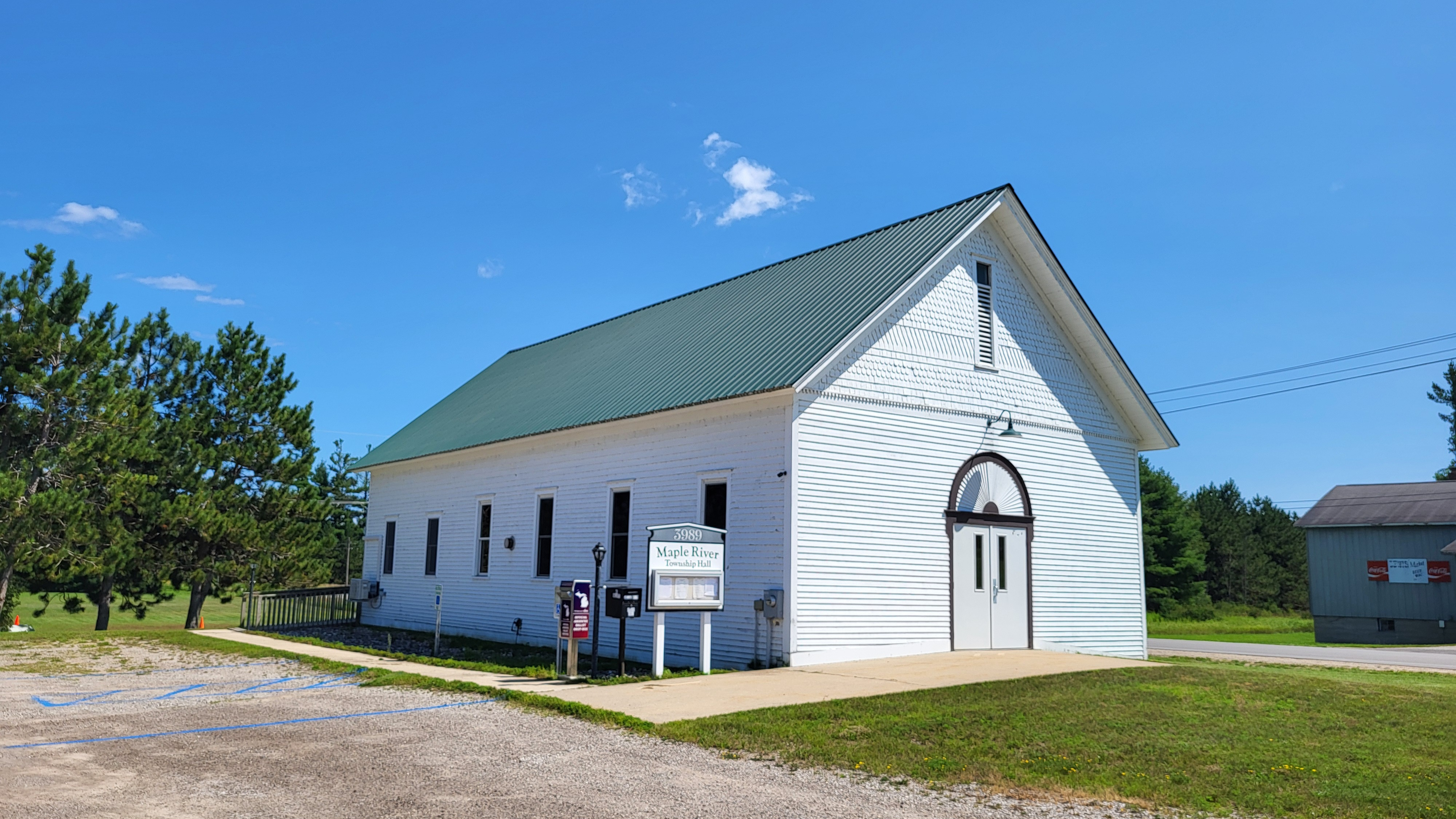
- Maple River Township Hall in Brutus

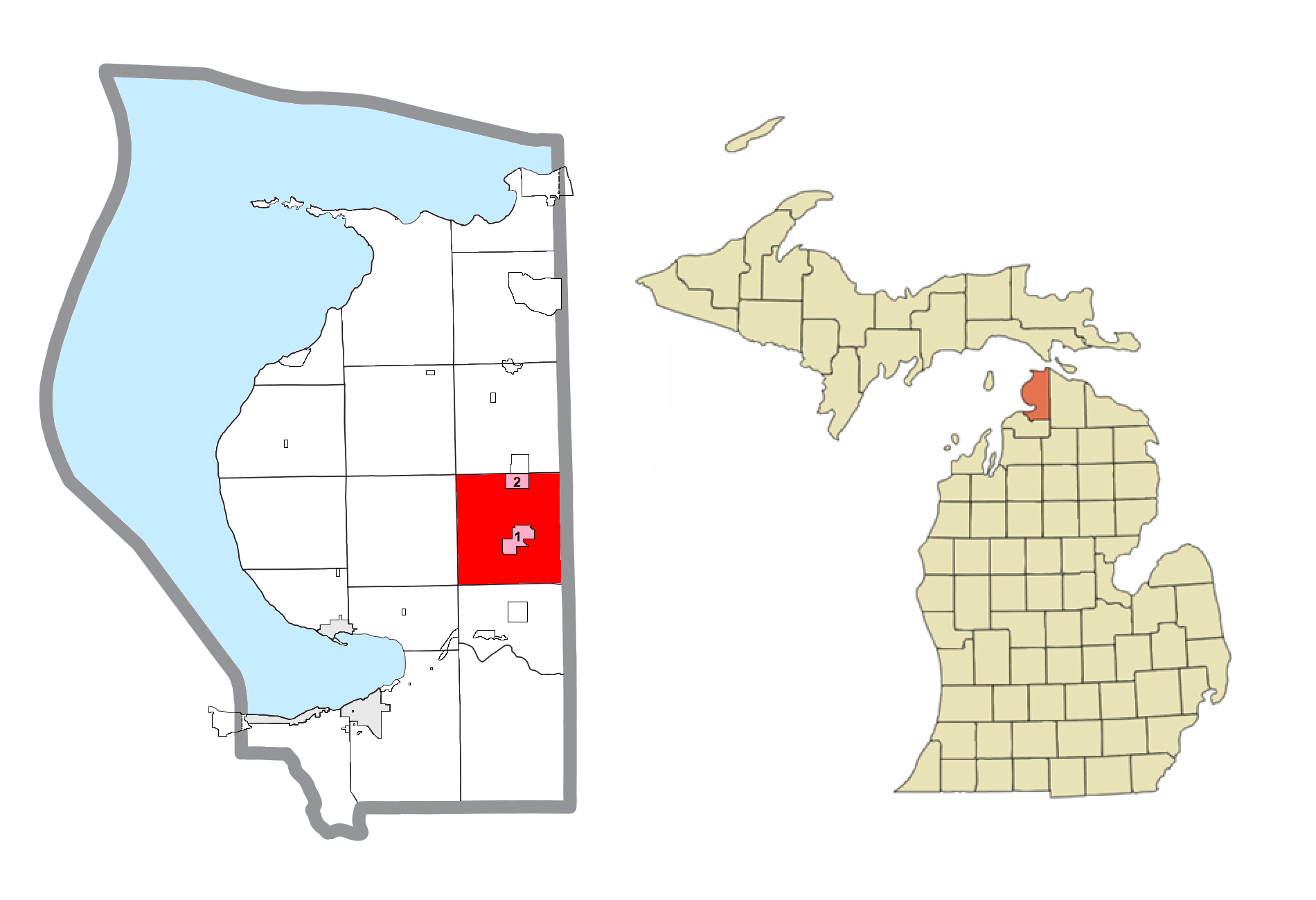
- Location within Emmet County and the administered community of Brutus (1) and portion of the village of Pellston (2)

- Location within the state of Michigan Maple River Township (the United States)
- Coordinates: 45°30′35″N 84°46′54″W
- Country: United States
- State: Michigan
- County: Emmet
- Established: 1877

Government
  - Supervisor: John Eby
  - Clerk: Tammy Gregory

Area
  - Total: 35.5 sq mi (91.9 km^{2})
  - Land: 35.3 sq mi (91.5 km^{2})
  - Water: 0.15 sq mi (0.4 km^{2})
- Elevation: 715 ft (218 m)

Population (2020)
  - Total: 1,295
  - Density: 36.7/sq mi (14.2/km^{2})
- Time zone: UTC-5 (Eastern (EST))
  - Summer (DST): UTC-4 (EDT)
- ZIP code(s): 49706 (Alanson); 49716 (Brutus); 49769 (Pellston)
- Area code: 231
- FIPS code: 26-51280
- GNIS feature ID: 1626679

Maple River Township is a civil township of Emmet County in the U.S. state of Michigan. The population was 1,295 at the 2020 census. Mennonite settlers from Waterloo County, Ontario arrived in Maple River in 1883.

== Communities ==
- The village of Pellston is partially located in the township on the boundary with adjacent McKinley Township.
- Brutus is an unincorporated community and census-designated place in the township on U.S. Highway 31 at 45°29′35″N 84°46′54″W. It is about 4 miles (6 km) south of Pellston and 3 miles (5 km) north of Alanson. It was established with the building of an inn called the Brutus House in 1874.

== Geography ==
According to the United States Census Bureau, the township has a total area of 35.47 square miles (91.9 km^{2}), of which 35.32 square miles (91.5 km^{2}) is land and 0.15 square miles (0.39 km^{2}) (0.42%) is water.

=== Climate ===
This climatic region has large seasonal temperature differences, with warm to hot (and often humid) summers and cold (sometimes severely cold) winters. According to the Köppen Climate Classification system, Maple River Township has a humid continental climate, abbreviated "Dfb" on climate maps.

== Demographics ==
As of the census of 2000, there were 1,232 people, 434 households, and 352 families residing in the township. The population density was 34.9 inhabitants per square mile (13.5/km^{2}). There were 533 housing units at an average density of 15.1 per square mile (5.8/km^{2}). The racial makeup of the township was 94.64% White, 2.84% Native American, 0.08% Asian, 0.16% Pacific Islander, and 2.27% from two or more races. Hispanic or Latino of any race were 0.81% of the population.

There were 434 households, out of which 38.7% had children under the age of 18 living with them, 70.5% were married couples living together, 5.5% had a female householder with no husband present, and 18.7% were non-families. 12.9% of all households were made up of individuals, and 4.4% had someone living alone who was 65 years of age or older. The average household size was 2.84 and the average family size was 3.09.

In the township the population was spread out, with 29.1% under the age of 18, 7.4% from 18 to 24, 29.5% from 25 to 44, 23.4% from 45 to 64, and 10.6% who were 65 years of age or older. The median age was 35 years. For every 100 females, there were 107.8 males. For every 100 females age 18 and over, there were 103.7 males.

The median income for a household in the township was $40,270, and the median income for a family was $41,250. Males had a median income of $27,452 versus $21,750 for females. The per capita income for the township was $16,765. About 5.1% of families and 5.9% of the population were below the poverty line, including 5.8% of those under age 18 and 9.9% of those age 65 or over.
