= Burt Township, Cheboygan County, Michigan =

Burt Township, Michigan
- Civil township
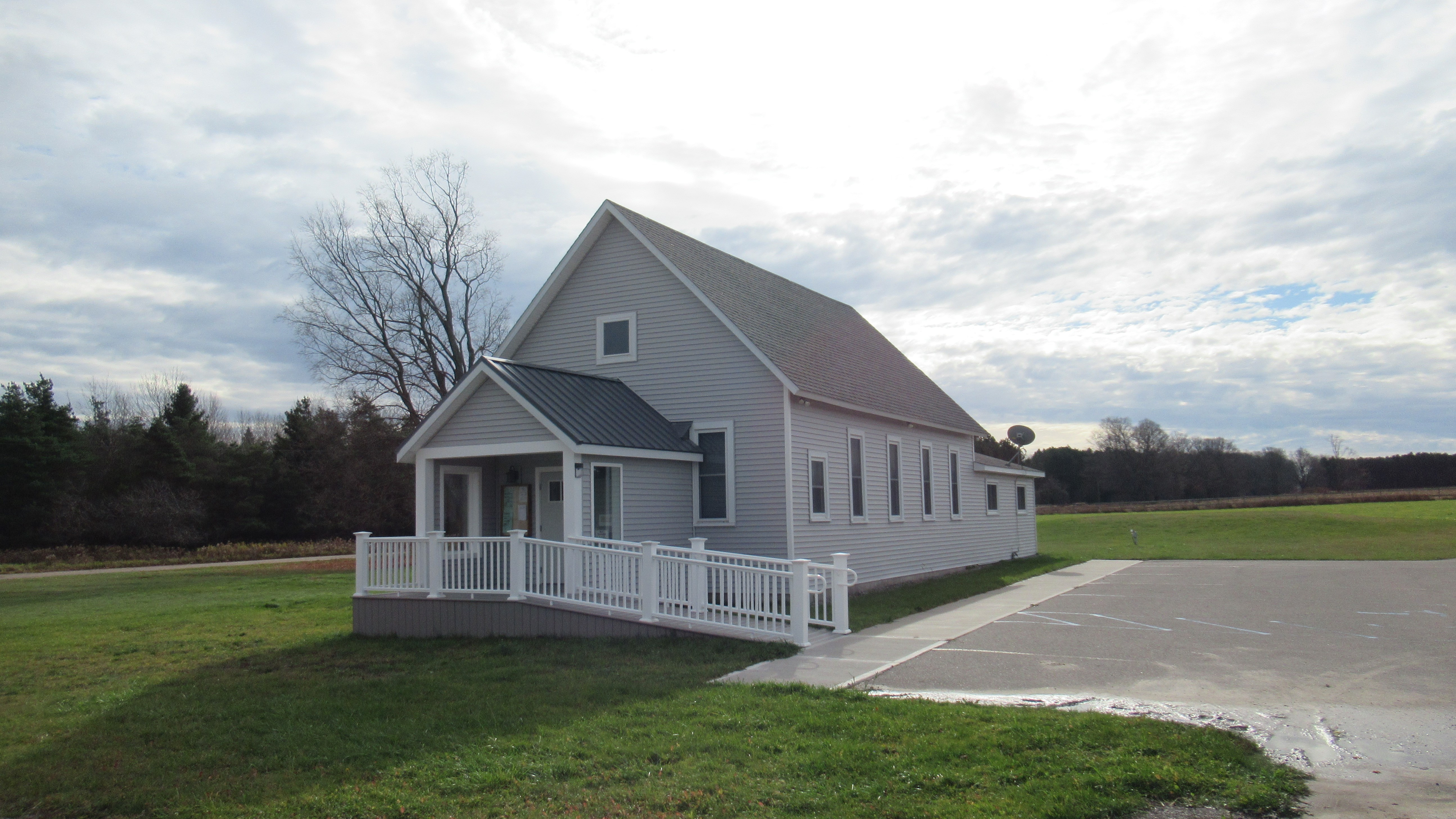
- Burt Township Hall

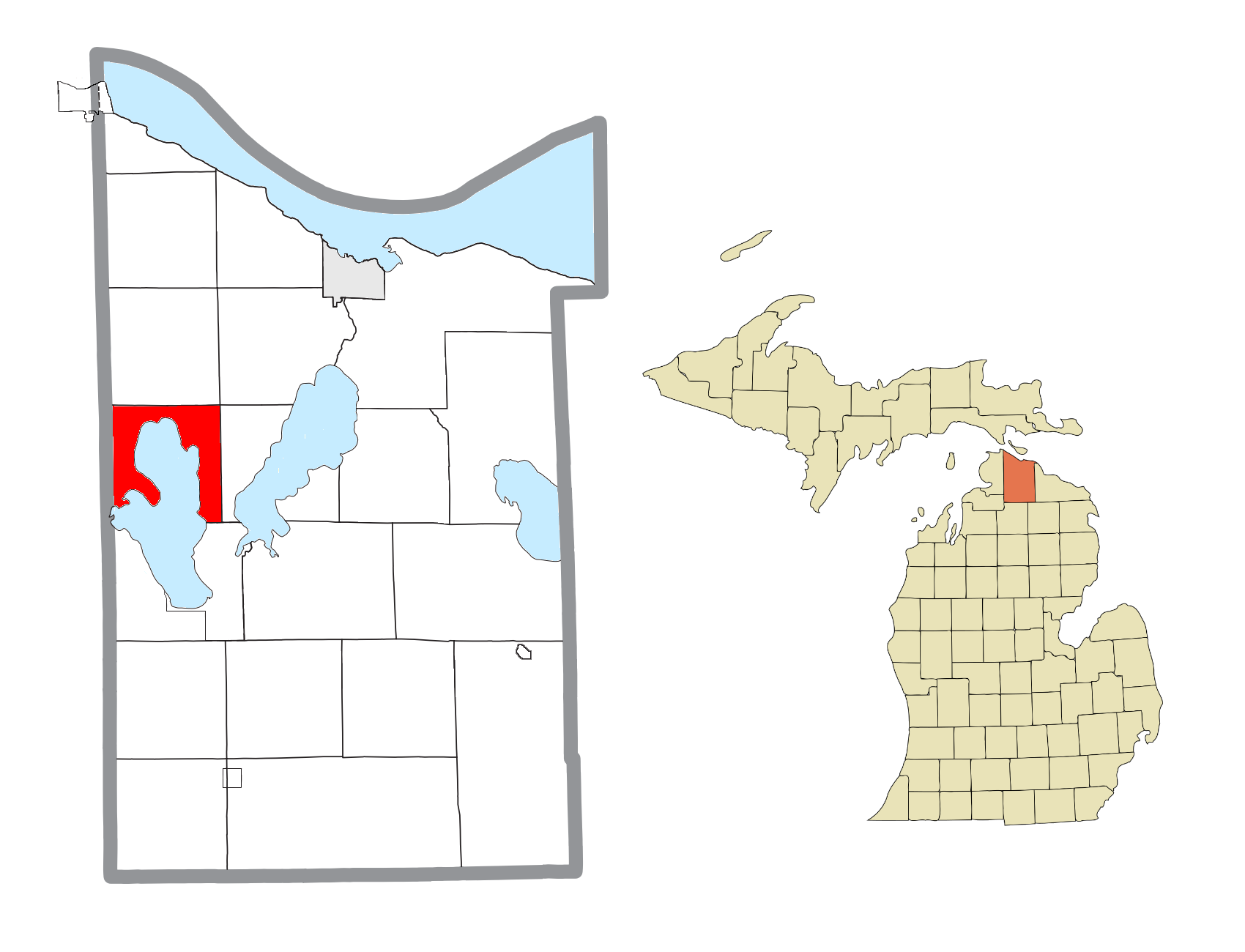
- Location within Cheboygan County

- Location within the state of Michigan Location within the United States
- Coordinates: 45°30′48″N 84°40′00″W
- Country: United States
- State: Michigan
- County: Cheboygan
- Established: 1880

Government
  - Supervisor: Eugene Hodulik
  - Clerk: Christy Kozlowski

Area
  - Total: 35.08 sq mi (90.86 km^{2})
  - Land: 19.73 sq mi (51.10 km^{2})
  - Water: 15.35 sq mi (39.76 km^{2})
- Elevation: 594 ft (181 m)

Population (2020)
  - Total: 710
  - Density: 35.9/sq mi (13.9/km^{2})
- Time zone: UTC-5 (Eastern (EST))
  - Summer (DST): UTC-4 (EDT)
- ZIP code(s): 49716 (Brutus); 49721 (Cheboygan); 49749 (Indian River)
- Area code: 231
- FIPS code: 26-11980
- GNIS feature ID: 1626009
- Website: Official website

Burt Township is a civil township of Cheboygan County in the U.S. state of Michigan. As of the 2020 census, the township population was 710.

== Communities ==
- Elmhurst is a place in the township located on a peninsula on the west side of Burt Lake at 45°29′46″N 84°41′19″W.

== Geography ==
According to the United States Census Bureau, the township has a total area of 35.1 square miles (90.9 km^{2}), of which 19.7 square miles (51.1 km^{2}) is land and 15.4 square miles (39.8 km^{2}), or 43.76%, is water, consisting primarily of the northern half of Burt Lake.

== Demographics ==
As of the census of 2000, there were 654 people, 312 households, and 208 families residing in the township. The population density was 33.2 inhabitants per square mile (12.8/km^{2}). There were 794 housing units at an average density of 40.3 per square mile (15.6/km^{2}). The racial makeup of the township was 95.11% White, 3.36% Native American, 0.15% Asian, and 1.38% from two or more races. Hispanic or Latino of any race were 0.31% of the population. There is also a small Jewish population.

There were 312 households, out of which 13.1% had children under the age of 18 living with them, 59.9% were married couples living together, 3.8% had a female householder with no husband present, and 33.3% were non-families. 30.4% of all households were made up of individuals, and 17.9% had someone living alone who was 65 years of age or older. The average household size was 2.10 and the average family size was 2.57.

In the township the population was spread out, with 13.0% under the age of 18, 4.6% from 18 to 24, 18.0% from 25 to 44, 35.5% from 45 to 64, and 28.9% who were 65 years of age or older. The median age was 54 years. For every 100 females, there were 104.4 males. For every 100 females age 18 and over, there were 107.7 males.

The median income for a household in the township was $38,816, and the median income for a family was $42,813. Males had a median income of $33,750 versus $26,500 for females. The per capita income for the township was $28,059. About 4.4% of families and 4.0% of the population were below the poverty line, including 3.2% of those under age 18 and 3.3% of those age 65 or over.
