= Pellston Regional Airport =

Pellston Regional Airport of Emmet County

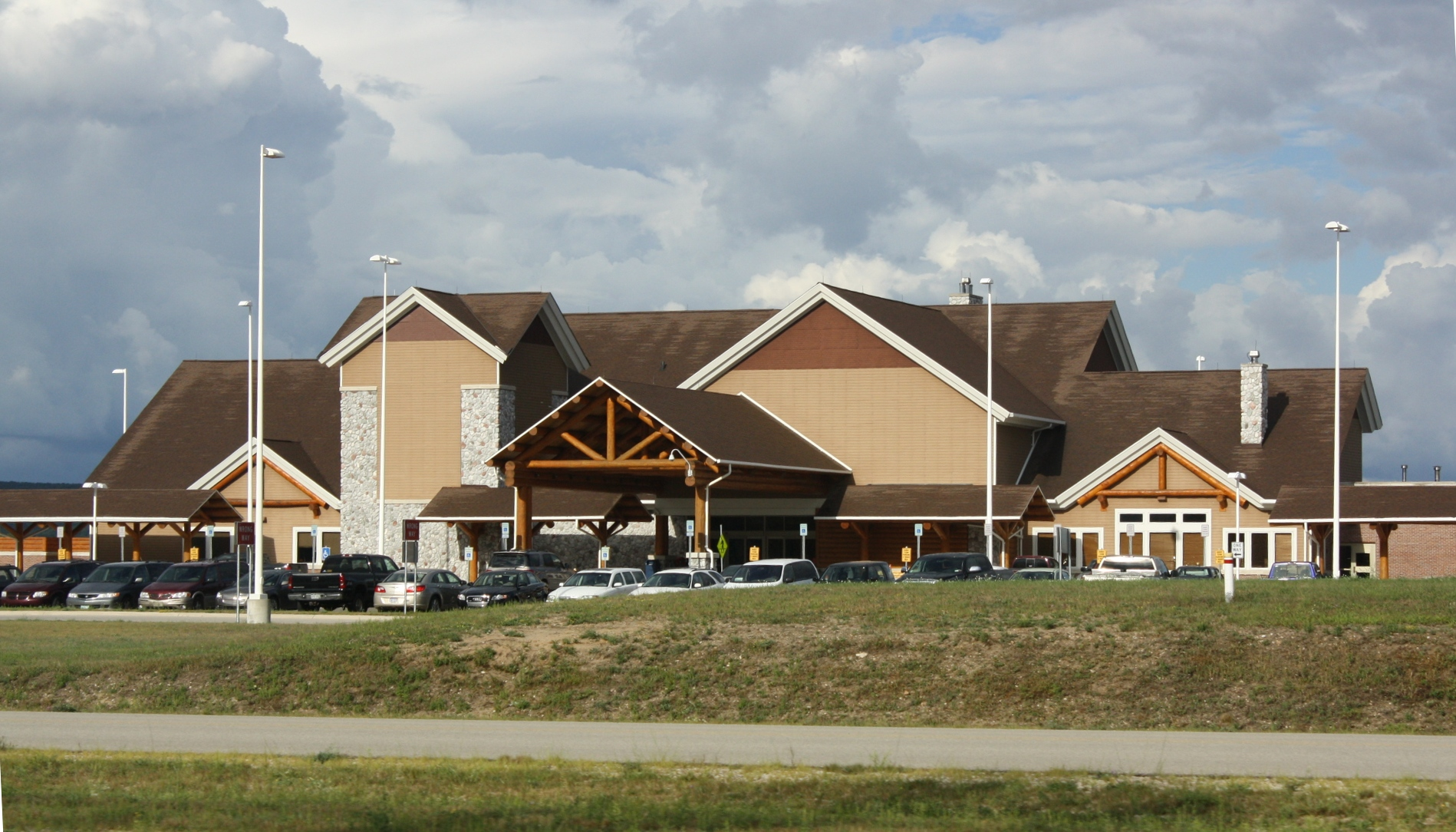
- Terminal building
- IATA: PLN; ICAO: KPLN; FAA LID: PLN

Summary
- Airport type: Public
- Owner: Emmet County
- Operator: The City of Pellston
- Serves: Northern Lower Peninsula of Michigan
- Elevation AMSL: 720 ft (220 m)
- Coordinates: 45°34′15″N 84°47′48″W
- Website: www.PellstonAirport.org

Map
- Interactive map of Pellston Regional Airport of Emmet County

Runways
Direction	Length		Surface
Direction	ft	m	Surface
14/32	6,513	1,985	Asphalt
5/23	5,401	1,646	Asphalt

Statistics
- Total passengers (2019): 57,420
- Aircraft operations (2022): 10,763
- Based aircraft (2020): 32
- Sources: Federal Aviation Administration, Michigan DOT

Pellston Regional Airport (IATA: PLN, ICAO: KPLN, FAA LID: PLN), also known as Pellston Regional Airport of Emmet County, is a public airport located one mile (1.6 km) northwest of the central business district of Pellston, a village in Emmet County, Michigan, United States. It is included in the Federal Aviation Administration (FAA) National Plan of Integrated Airport Systems for 2017–2021, in which it is categorized as a non-hub primary commercial service facility.

Mainly a general aviation airport, Pellston Regional Airport also functions as the primary commercial airport for the sparsely populated northern tip of Michigan's Lower Peninsula, owing to its location halfway between the region's primary cities, Petoskey and Cheboygan, as well as its proximity to the tourist centers of Mackinaw City and Mackinac Island. One commercial airline, SkyWest (doing business as Delta Connection), currently serves Pellston Regional with three departures and three arrivals daily.

The 35,000-square-foot (3,252 m^{2}) northern lodge-themed passenger terminal building was constructed in 2003 and designed by architect Paul W. Powers. The new passenger terminal building replaced a smaller terminal building that was demolished. Wireless internet service is available throughout the terminal at no charge to travelers.

The airport has commercial service on Delta Air Lines with regional jets operated by SkyWest Airlines. SkyWest generated controversy when it announced plans to operate Essential Air Service (EAS) flights to Pellston as tag flights from Detroit continuing on to Escanaba, another EAS community, and then ending in Minneapolis. The airline cited pilot shortages for the need to condense their flights to the two cities. Both communities objected and threatened to call their U.S. Senators, and SkyWest ended the tag services after a month of flying them. However, more plans for tag flights were expected to take effect in December 2022, operating from Detroit to Pellston to Alpena and then back to Detroit.

The airport received $1,000,000 in 2020 as part of the federal CARES act to maintain operations and receive upgrades during the COVID-19 pandemic.

== Facilities and aircraft ==
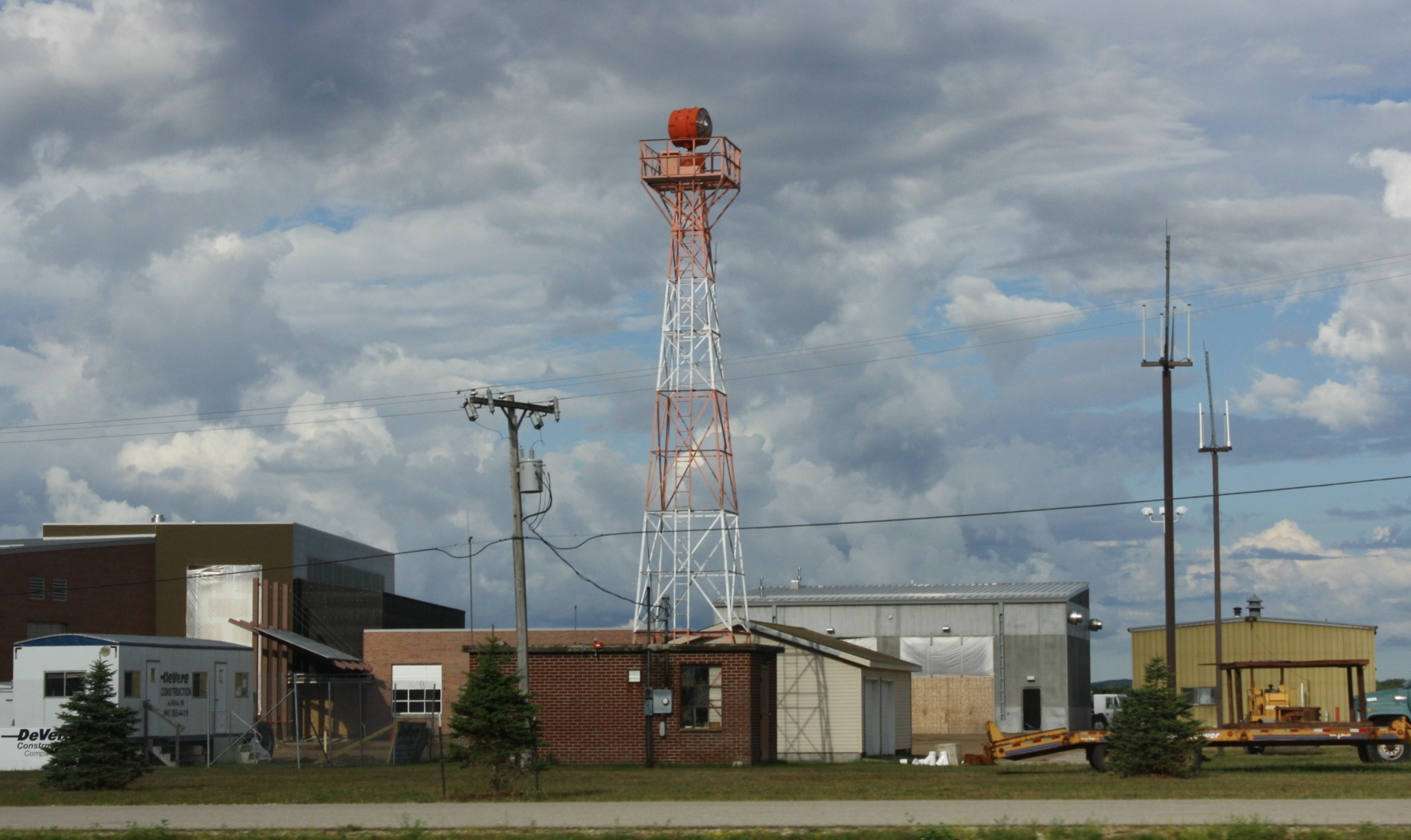
Rotating beacon tower

Pellston Regional Airport covers an area of 1,675 acres (678 ha) and contains two asphalt paved runways: 14/32 measures 6,513 by 150 feet (1,985 m × 46 m) and 5/23 is 5,401 by 150 feet (1,646 m × 46 m).

For the 12-month period ending April 30, 2022, the airport has about 12,000 aircraft operations, or about 32 per day. This includes 84% general aviation, 15% commercial, and <1% military. For the same time period, there are 32 aircraft based on the field: 23 single-engine and 5 multi-engine airplanes as well as 4 jet aircraft.

The airport operates an FBO offering fuel, a courtesy shuttle, conference rooms, crew lounges, snooze rooms, and showers.

== Airlines and destinations ==
=== Passenger ===
Airlines	Destinations
Delta Connection	Detroit
United Express	Seasonal: Chicago–O'Hare

Destinations map
Destinations from Pellston Regional Airport
Red = Year-round destination
Green = Seasonal destination
Blue = Future destination

=== Cargo ===
Airlines	Destinations
Ameriflight	Lansing, Sault Ste. Marie (MI)
FedEx Feeder	Grand Rapids

=== Statistics ===
Carrier shares (September 2025 – August 2026)
Carrier	Passengers (arriving and departing)
Skywest	55,440(100%)

Top domestic destinations (September 2025 – August 2026)
Rank	Airport	Passengers	Airline
1	Detroit, Michigan	20,400	Delta
2	Chicago–O'Hare, Illinois	7,860	United Airlines

== Terminal ==
The current terminal serves as baggage claim, check-in, ticketing, TSA checkpoint and gates. Owing to the airport being very small in size and the number of flights, only two gates are necessary and both are located in the terminal. Since 2009, travel services and offices have been placed at the end of baggage claim. Airline representatives manage check-in, ticketing and work as the gate agents. The others are ground crew and baggage services. Delta/SkyWest currently has two aircraft in use; both are 76-seat Canadair Regional Jets 700/900 series.

== Accidents and incidents ==
- On April 23, 1970, a McDonnell Douglas DC-9, operated by North Central Airlines, destined for Sault Ste. Marie Airport, was hijacked. One hijacker demanded to be taken to Detroit. The hijacker was taken down; there were no fatalities.
- On May 9, 1970, the UAW President, Walter Reuther; his wife, May; architect Oscar Stonorov; Reuther's bodyguard, William Wolfman; and the pilot and co-pilot were killed when their chartered Lear-Jet crashed in flames at 9:33 p.m. Michigan time. The plane, arriving from Detroit in rain and fog, was on final approach to the Pellston airstrip near the union's recreational and educational facility at Black Lake. The Learjet 23, operated by Executive Jet Aviation and registered as N434EJ, crashed into trees and caught fire short of the runway. An investigation concluded that illusions produced by the lack of visual cues during a circling approach over unlighted terrain at night to a runway not equipped with approach lights or other visual approach aids caused the crash. The aircraft was written off; there were six fatalities.
- On May 13, 1978, a brand new Piper Cheyenne with less than twenty hours had a controlled flight into terrain (CFIT) two miles from the departure end of Runway 32 after failing to land at Boyne Falls airport. The NTSB investigation concluded the pilot attempted to land below published minimums for the instrument landing system (ILS) approach. The weather was extremely foggy at the time, with less than 3/8-mile (600 m) visibility and 200-foot (61 m) ceiling, while the approach called for a 600-foot (180 m) ceiling and 2-mile (3.2 km) visibility. A contributing factor was the finding that the middle marker for Runway 32 was not functioning at the time, possibly contributing to the disorientation of the pilot and his location relative to the airfield. The aircraft was destroyed; there were three fatalities.
- On January 21, 1999, a Beechcraft Baron had a CFIT while on an ILS approach to the airport. The probable cause was found to be the pilot's failure to maintain altitude and terrain clearance on approach and flight into known icing conditions, as a Saab 340 operated by Mesaba Airlines had earlier reported moderate icing below 3,000 feet while on approach to Pellston. Contributing factors include the pilot's intoxication, the icing conditions, known equipment deficiencies in the aircraft, and trees on the impacted hill. The pilot and two passengers died.
- On February 10, 2007, a Piper Cherokee Six crashed northeast of the airport. The aircraft lost engine power and came to rest in a wooded area. All four aboard survived.
- On January 15, 2013, a Cessna 208B Cargomaster, operated by Martinaire and registered as N1120N, crashed shortly after takeoff from Pellston Regional Airport. It came down in a wooded area; there was one fatality.

== See also ==
- List of airports in Michigan
