= Brutus, Michigan =

- Census-designated place (CDP) & unincorporated community
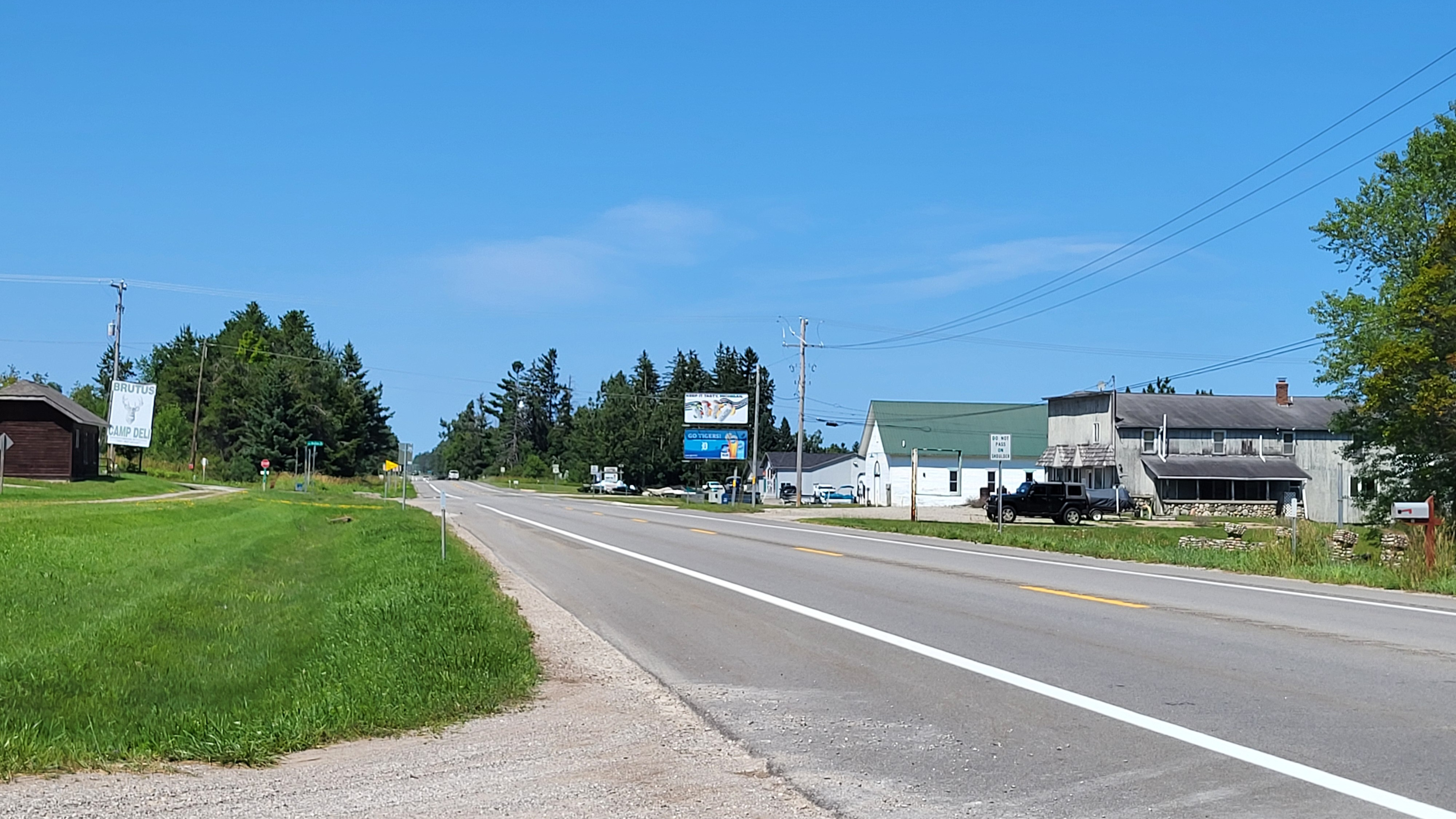
- Looking north along U.S. Route 31

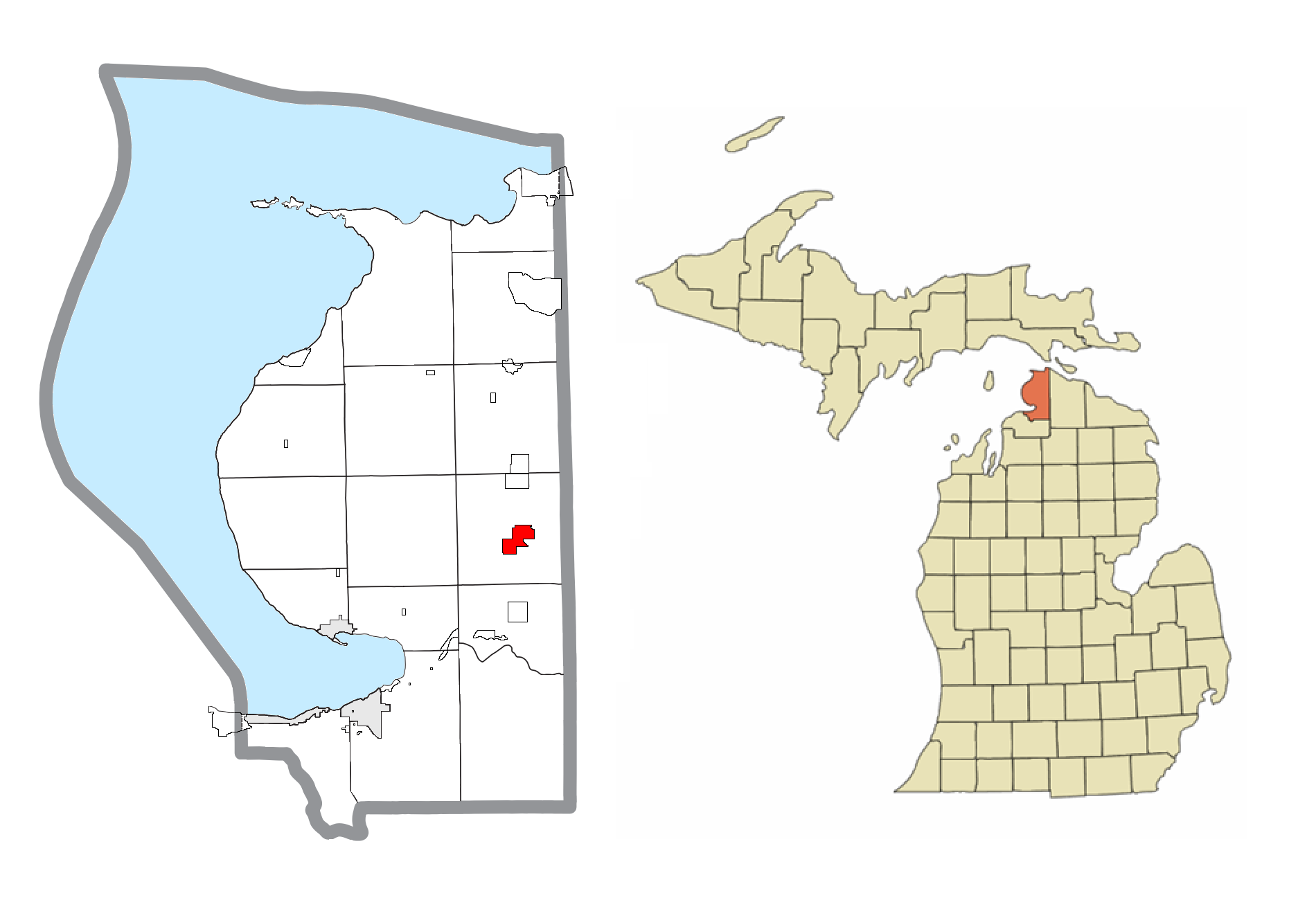
- Location within Emmet County

- Location within the state of Michigan Brutus (the United States)
- Coordinates: 45°29′36″N 84°46′52″W
- Country: United States
- State: Michigan
- County: Emmet
- Township: Maple River
- Settled: 1874

Area
  - Total: 2.83 sq mi (7.32 km^{2})
  - Land: 2.82 sq mi (7.31 km^{2})
  - Water: 0.0039 sq mi (0.01 km^{2})
- Elevation: 679 ft (207 m)

Population (2020)
  - Total: 202
  - Density: 71.5/sq mi (27.62/km^{2})
- Time zone: UTC-5 (Eastern (EST))
  - Summer (DST): UTC-4 (EDT)
- ZIP code(s): 49716
- Area code: 231
- FIPS code: 26-11380
- GNIS feature ID: 622148

Brutus is an unincorporated community and census-designated place (CDP) in Emmet County in the U.S. state of Michigan. As of the 2020 census, Brutus had a population of 202. Brutus is located within Maple River Township.

It was established with the building of an inn called the Brutus House in 1874.

== Geography ==
Brutus is located in eastern Emmet County, near the center of Maple River Township. US Highway 31 passes through the center of Brutus, leading north 4 miles (6 km) to Pellston and south 3.5 miles (5.6 km) to Alanson. Petoskey, the Emmet County seat, is 14 miles (23 km) southbound on US 31.

The community of Brutus was listed as a newly-organized census-designated place for the 2010 census, meaning it now has officially defined boundaries and population statistics for the first time.

According to the U.S. Census Bureau, the Brutus CDP has a total area of 2.8 square miles (7.3 km^{2}), of which 1.5 acres (5,985 m^{2}), or 0.08%, is water.

== Education ==
In much of the CDP, the school district is Alanson Public Schools. In northern parts, the district is Pellston Public Schools.

== Demographics ==
Historical population
Census	Pop.	Note	%±
2020	202		—
U.S. Decennial Census
