= Hebron Township, Michigan =

- Civil township
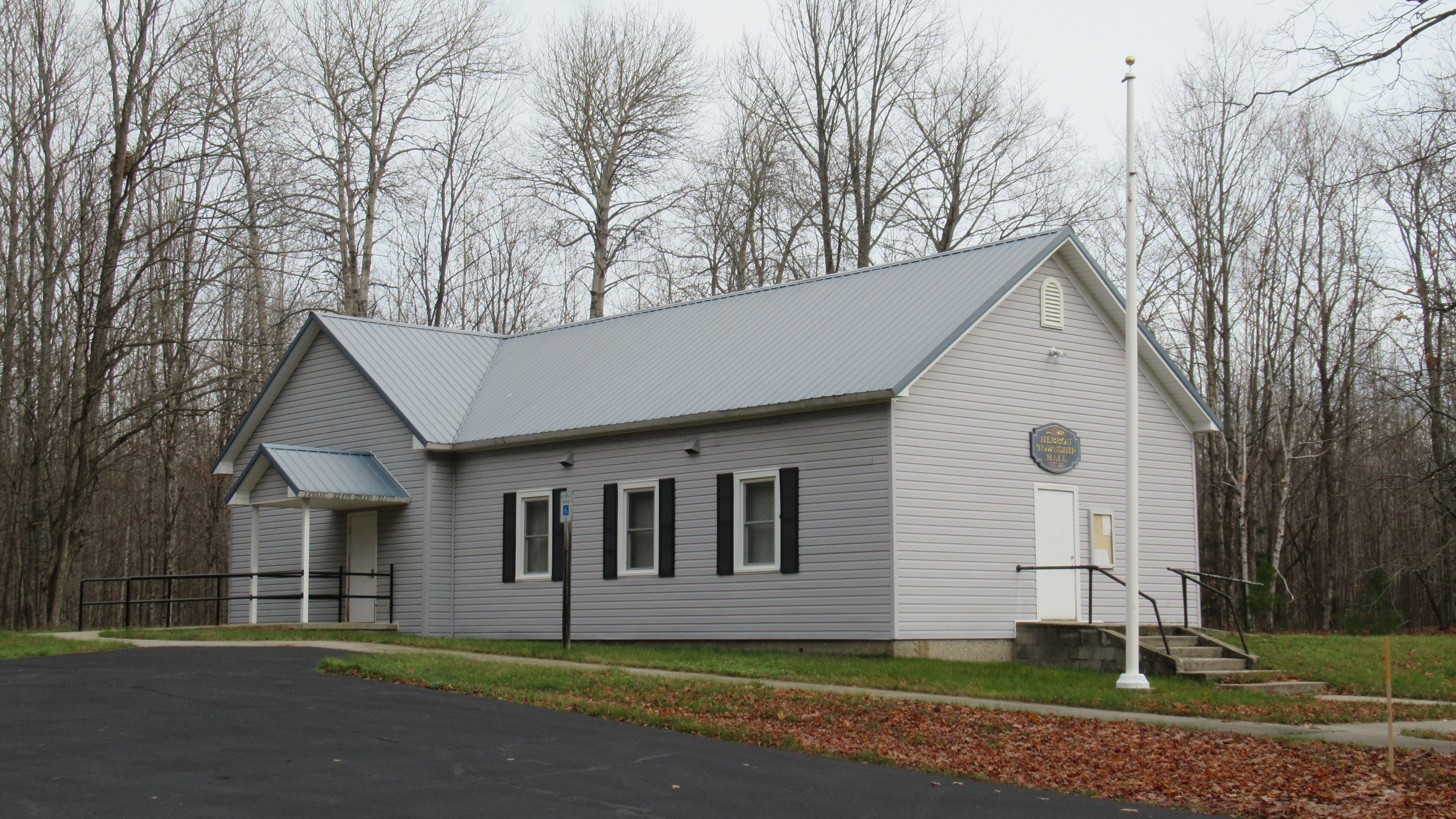
- Hebron Township Hall

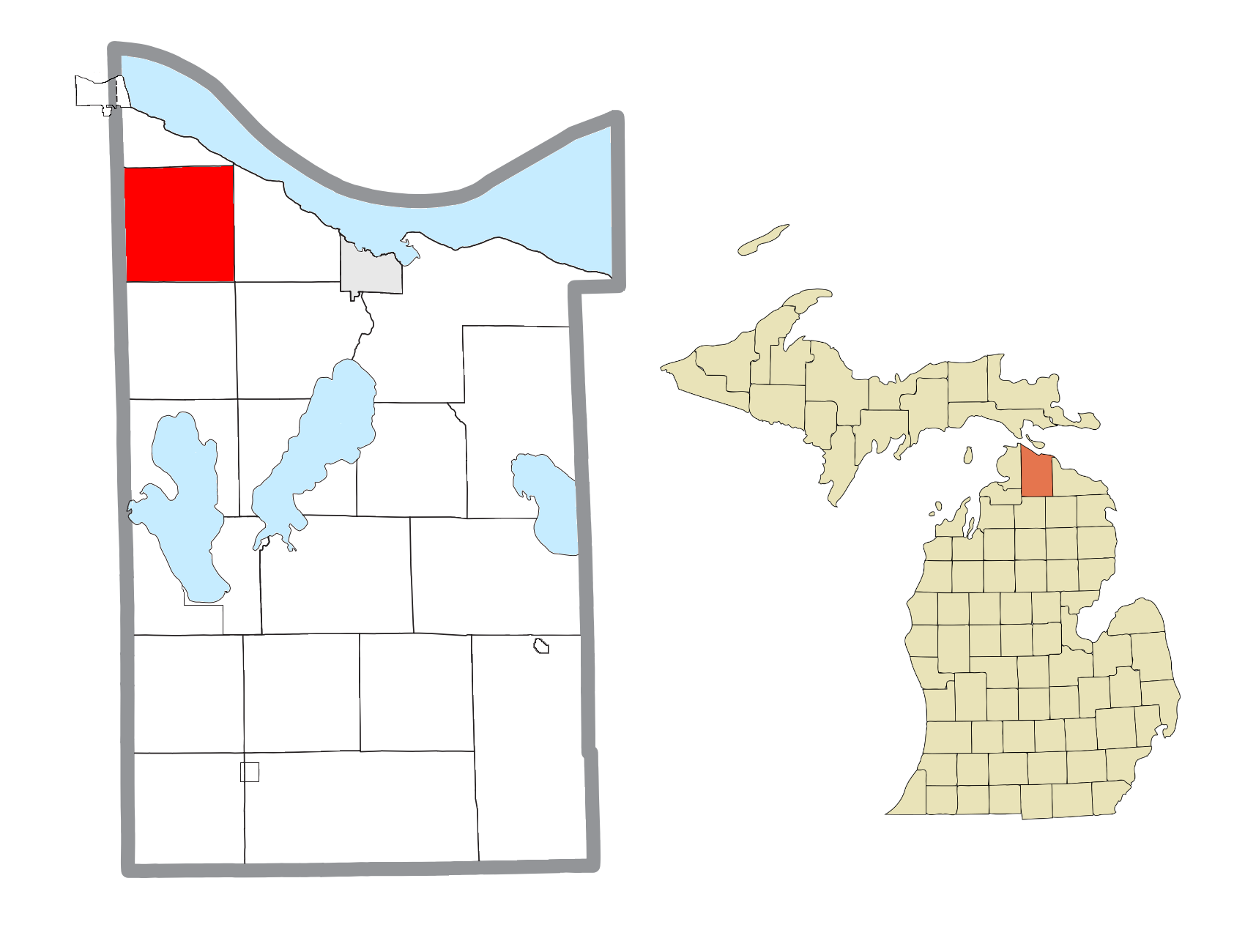
- Location within Cheboygan County

- Location within the state of Michigan Location within the United States
- Coordinates: 45°40′41″N 84°40′48″W
- Country: United States
- State: Michigan
- County: Cheboygan
- Established: 1884

Government
  - Supervisor: Andrew Beethem
  - Clerk: Gary Douglas

Area
  - Total: 34.80 sq mi (90.13 km^{2})
  - Land: 34.05 sq mi (88.19 km^{2})
  - Water: 0.75 sq mi (1.94 km^{2})
- Elevation: 738 ft (225 m)

Population (2020)
  - Total: 298
  - Density: 8.75/sq mi (3.38/km^{2})
- Time zone: UTC-5 (Eastern (EST))
  - Summer (DST): UTC-4 (EDT)
- ZIP code(s): 49718 (Carp Lake); 49721 (Cheboygan); 49755 (Levering)
- Area code: 231
- FIPS code: 26-37480
- GNIS feature ID: 1626460

Hebron Township is a civil township of Cheboygan County in the U.S. state of Michigan. As of the 2020 census, the township population was 298.

== Communities ==
- Dow was the name of a rural post office in this township that began in 1904.

== Geography ==
Hebron Township is located in northwest Cheboygan County, bordered by Emmet County to the west. I-75 crosses the township from southeast to northwest, with access from Exit 326 (Levering Road, C-66) at the township's southern border. Exit 336 with US 31 (Mackinaw Highway) lies just beyond the northwest corner of the township.

According to the United States Census Bureau, the township has a total area of 34.8 square miles (90.1 km^{2}), of which 34.1 square miles (88.2 km^{2}) is land and 0.73 square miles (1.9 km^{2}), or 2.16%, is water.

== Demographics ==
As of the census of 2000, there were 303 people, 118 households, and 86 families residing in the township. The population density was 8.9 inhabitants per square mile (3.4/km^{2}). There were 195 housing units at an average density of 5.7 per square mile (2.2/km^{2}). The racial makeup of the township was 90.76% White, 7.26% Native American, and 1.98% from two or more races. Hispanic or Latino of any race were 1.32% of the population.

There were 118 households, out of which 33.1% had children under the age of 18 living with them, 57.6% were married couples living together, 11.0% had a female householder with no husband present, and 26.3% were non-families. 22.0% of all households were made up of individuals, and 9.3% had someone living alone who was 65 years of age or older. The average household size was 2.57 and the average family size was 2.98.

In the township the population was spread out, with 29.0% under the age of 18, 5.3% from 18 to 24, 32.7% from 25 to 44, 23.4% from 45 to 64, and 9.6% who were 65 years of age or older. The median age was 37 years. For every 100 females, there were 106.1 males. For every 100 females age 18 and over, there were 99.1 males.

The median income for a household in the township was $36,875, and the median income for a family was $37,417. Males had a median income of $30,625 versus $20,750 for females. The per capita income for the township was $15,737. About 7.5% of families and 12.0% of the population were below the poverty line, including 20.5% of those under the age of eighteen and 7.4% of those 65 or over.
