= McKinley Township, Emmet County, Michigan =

McKinley Township, Michigan
- Civil township
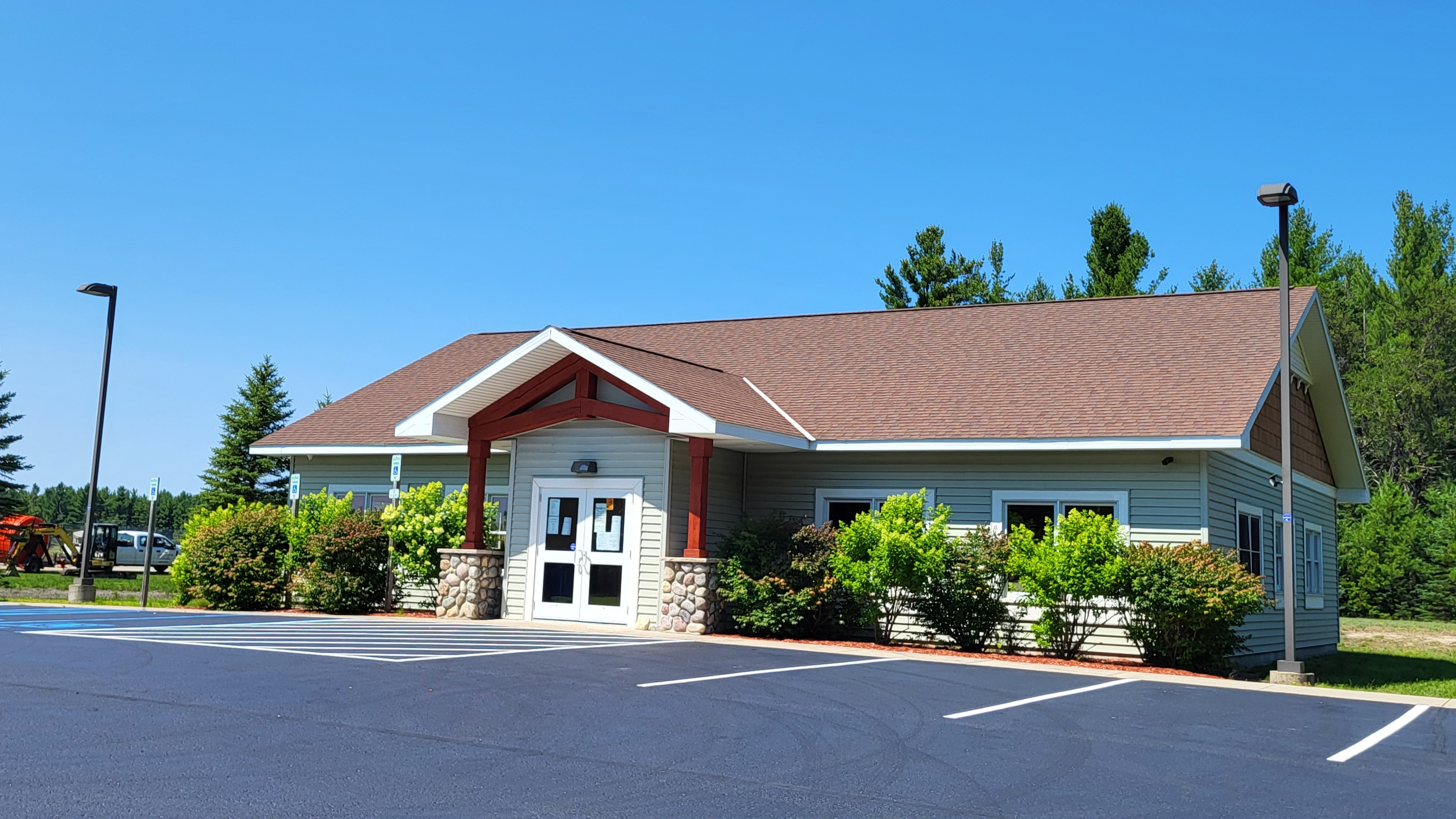
- McKinley Township Hall

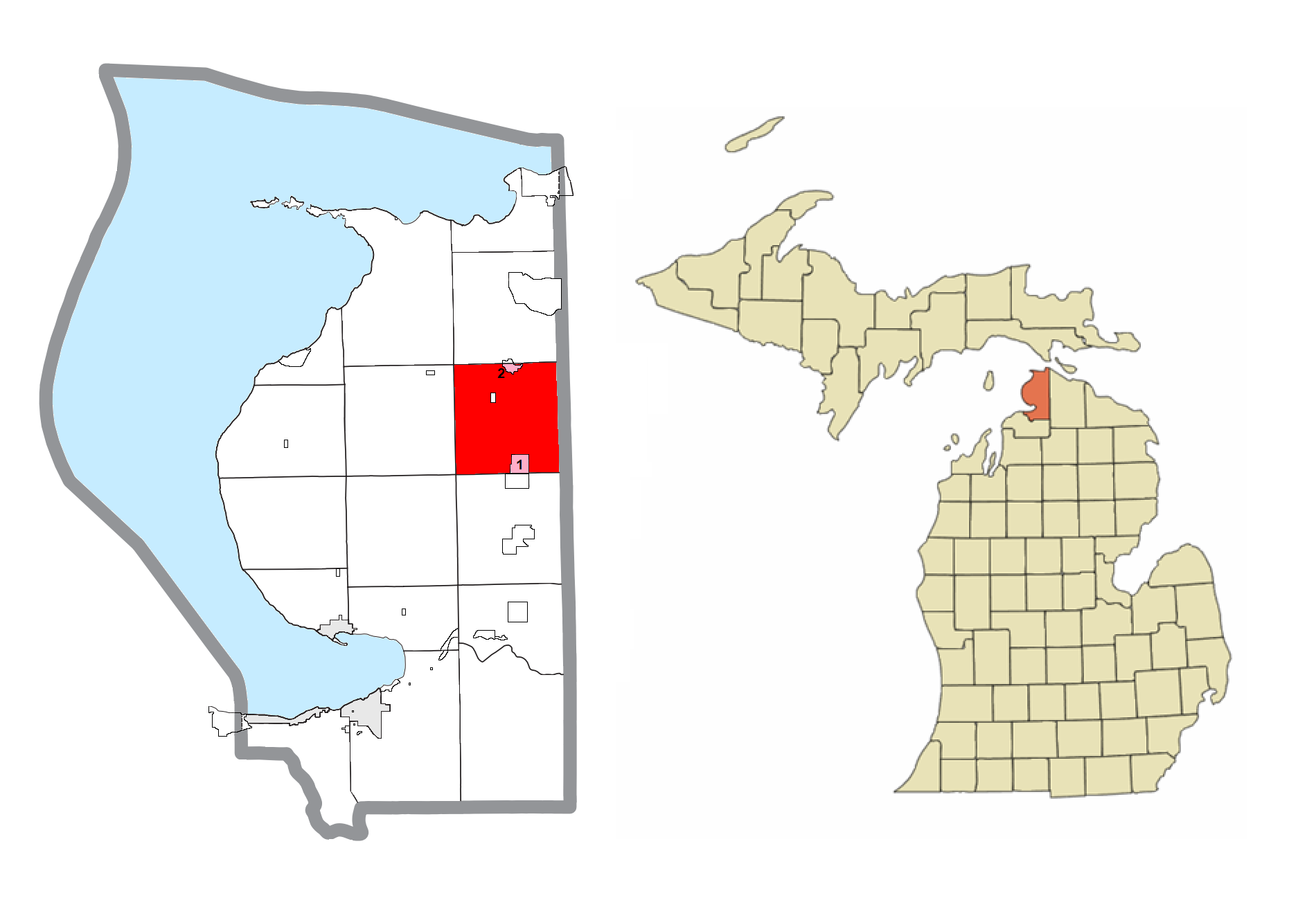
- Location within Emmet County (red) and an administered portion of the village of Pellston (1) and community of Levering (2)

- Location within the state of Michigan McKinley Township (the United States)
- Coordinates: 45°35′13″N 84°47′16″W
- Country: United States
- State: Michigan
- County: Emmet

Government
  - Supervisor: Mark Drier
  - Clerk: Alicia Morrow

Area
  - Total: 35.18 sq mi (91.1 km^{2})
  - Land: 35.11 sq mi (90.9 km^{2})
  - Water: 0.07 sq mi (0.18 km^{2})
- Elevation: 738 ft (225 m)

Population (2020)
  - Total: 1,294
  - Density: 36.86/sq mi (14.23/km^{2})
- Time zone: UTC-5 (Eastern (EST))
  - Summer (DST): UTC-4 (EDT)
- ZIP code(s): 49755 (Levering); 49769 (Pellston)
- Area code: 231
- FIPS code: 26-50340
- GNIS feature ID: 1626656

McKinley Township is a civil township of Emmet County in the U.S. state of Michigan. The population was 1,294 at the 2020 census. McKinley Township is home to Pellston Regional Airport.

== Communities ==
- The village of Pellston is partially within the township.
- Levering is an unincorporated community and census-designated place at the northern border of the township, about 6 miles (10 km) north of Pellston and 4 miles (6 km) south of Carp Lake on US 31 at 45°38′09″N 84°47′13″W.
- Van is an unincorporated community within the township at 45°35′38.04″N 84°46′57.17″W. Van was established in 1898 as Egleston, and renamed in honor of the local Van Every family in 1898. A post office at Van lasted from 1898 to 1933.

== Geography ==
According to the United States Census Bureau, the township has a total area of 35.18 square miles (91.12 km^{2}), of which 35.11 square miles (90.93 km^{2}) is land and 0.07 square miles (0.18 km^{2}) (0.20%) is water.

== Demographics ==
As of the census of 2000, there were 1,269 people, 459 households, and 330 families residing in the township. The population density was 36.0 inhabitants per square mile (13.9/km^{2}). There were 572 housing units at an average density of 16.2 per square mile (6.3/km^{2}). The racial makeup of the township was 90.46% White, 0.87% African American, 6.15% Native American, 0.16% Asian, 0.08% Pacific Islander, 0.08% from other races, and 2.21% from two or more races. Hispanic or Latino of any race were 0.87% of the population.

There were 459 households, out of which 37.9% had children under the age of 18 living with them, 55.8% were married couples living together, 10.9% had a female householder with no husband present, and 28.1% were non-families. 22.0% of all households were made up of individuals, and 8.7% had someone living alone who was 65 years of age or older. The average household size was 2.76 and the average family size was 3.25.

In the township the population was spread out, with 32.4% under the age of 18, 6.9% from 18 to 24, 29.6% from 25 to 44, 20.3% from 45 to 64, and 10.8% who were 65 years of age or older. The median age was 33 years. For every 100 females, there were 97.4 males. For every 100 females age 18 and over, there were 94.1 males.

The median income for a household in the township was $32,961, and the median income for a family was $38,681. Males had a median income of $26,759 versus $20,179 for females. The per capita income for the township was $13,907. About 11.9% of families and 13.9% of the population were below the poverty line, including 14.5% of those under age 18 and 15.6% of those age 65 or over.
