= Levering, Michigan =

- Census-designated place (CDP) & unincorporated community
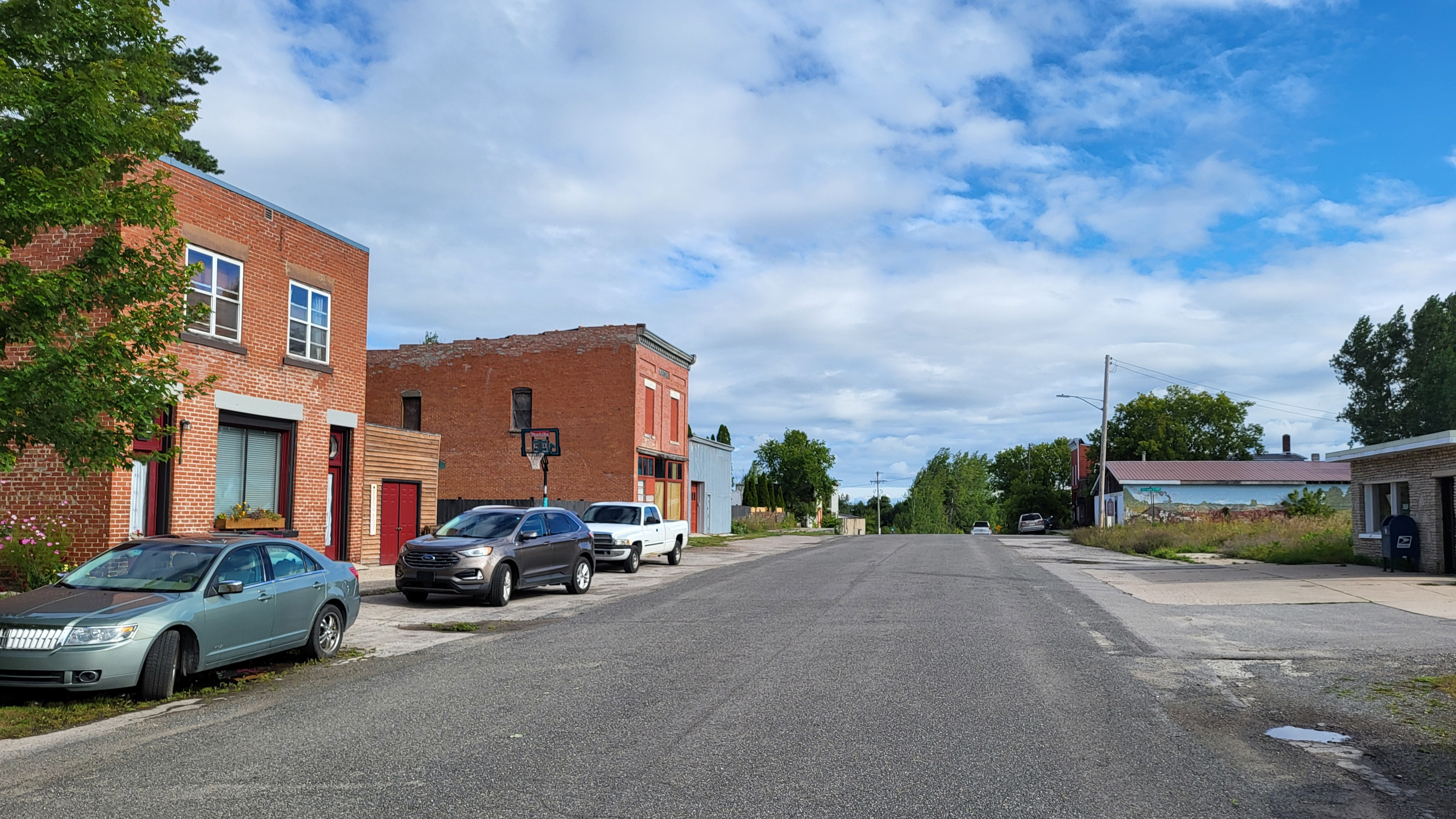
- Looking north along Robinson Street

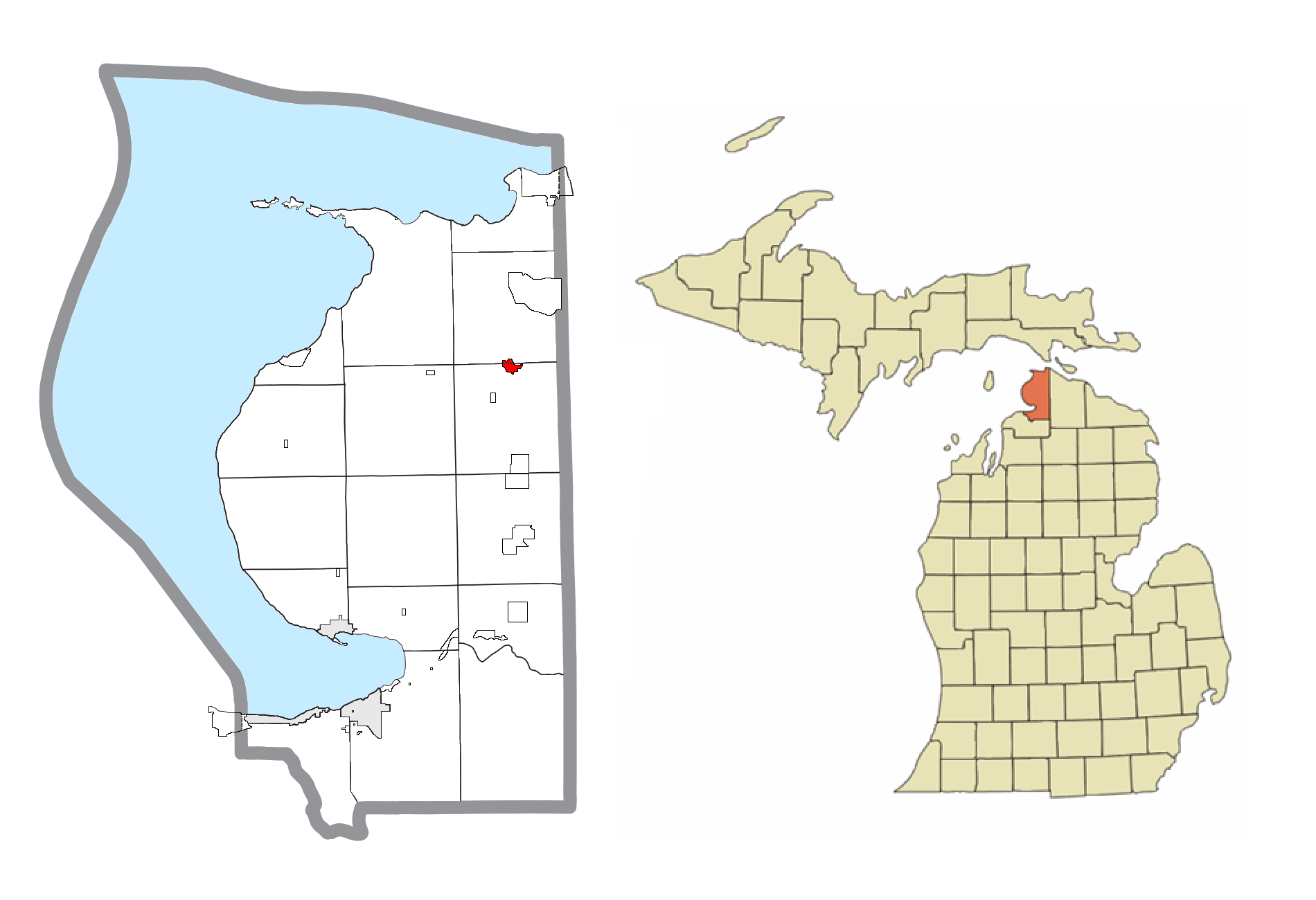
- Location within Emmet County

- Location within the state of Michigan Location within the United States
- Coordinates: 45°38′09″N 84°47′13″W
- Country: United States
- State: Michigan
- County: Emmet
- Townships: Carp Lake and McKinley

Area
  - Total: 0.44 sq mi (1.13 km^{2})
  - Land: 0.44 sq mi (1.13 km^{2})
  - Water: 0 sq mi (0.00 km^{2})
- Elevation: 758 ft (231 m)

Population (2020)
  - Total: 176
  - Density: 403.5/sq mi (155.78/km^{2})
- Time zone: UTC-5 (Eastern (EST))
  - Summer (DST): UTC-4 (EDT)
- ZIP code(s): 49755
- Area code: 231
- FIPS code: 26-47240
- GNIS feature ID: 630340

Levering is an unincorporated community and census-designated place (CDP) in Emmet County in the U.S. state of Michigan. As of the 2020 census, Levering had a population of 176.

== Geography ==
Levering is located in northeastern Emmet County, in northern McKinley Township and southern Carp Lake Township. U.S. Highway 31 passes through the community, leading north 11 miles (18 km) to Mackinaw City and south 6 miles (10 km) to Pellston. Petoskey, the Emmet County seat, is 24 miles (39 km) south on US 31.

The community of Levering was listed as a newly organized census-designated place for the 2010 census, meaning it now has officially defined boundaries and population statistics for the first time.

According to the U.S. Census Bureau, the Levering CDP has a total area of 0.44 square miles (1.1 km^{2}), all of it land.

== Demographics ==
Historical population
Census	Pop.	Note	%±
2020	176		—
U.S. Decennial Census
