= Pellston, Michigan =

- Village
- Village of Pellston
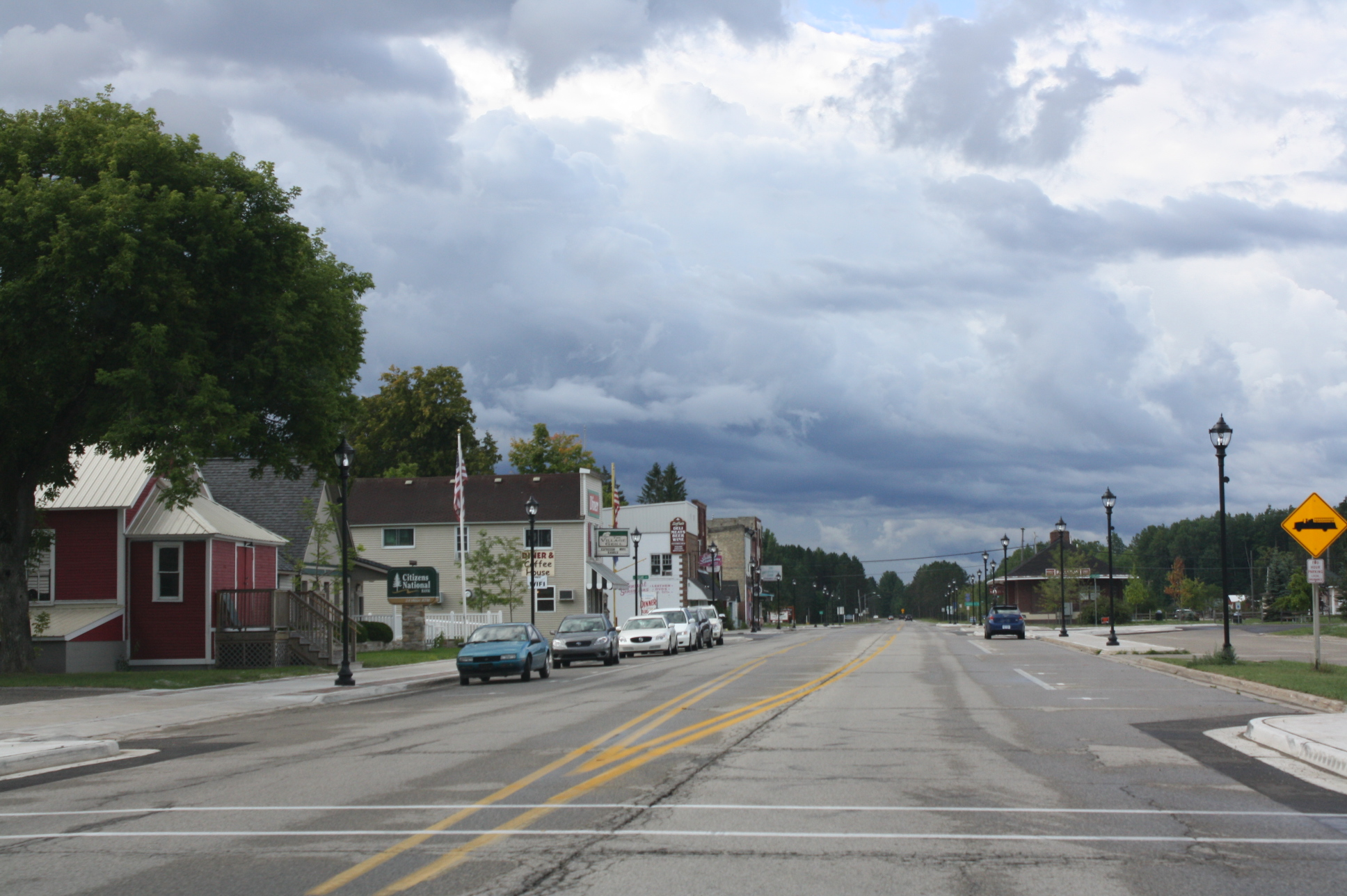
- Downtown Pellston along U.S. Route 31
- Nickname: Ice Box of the Nation
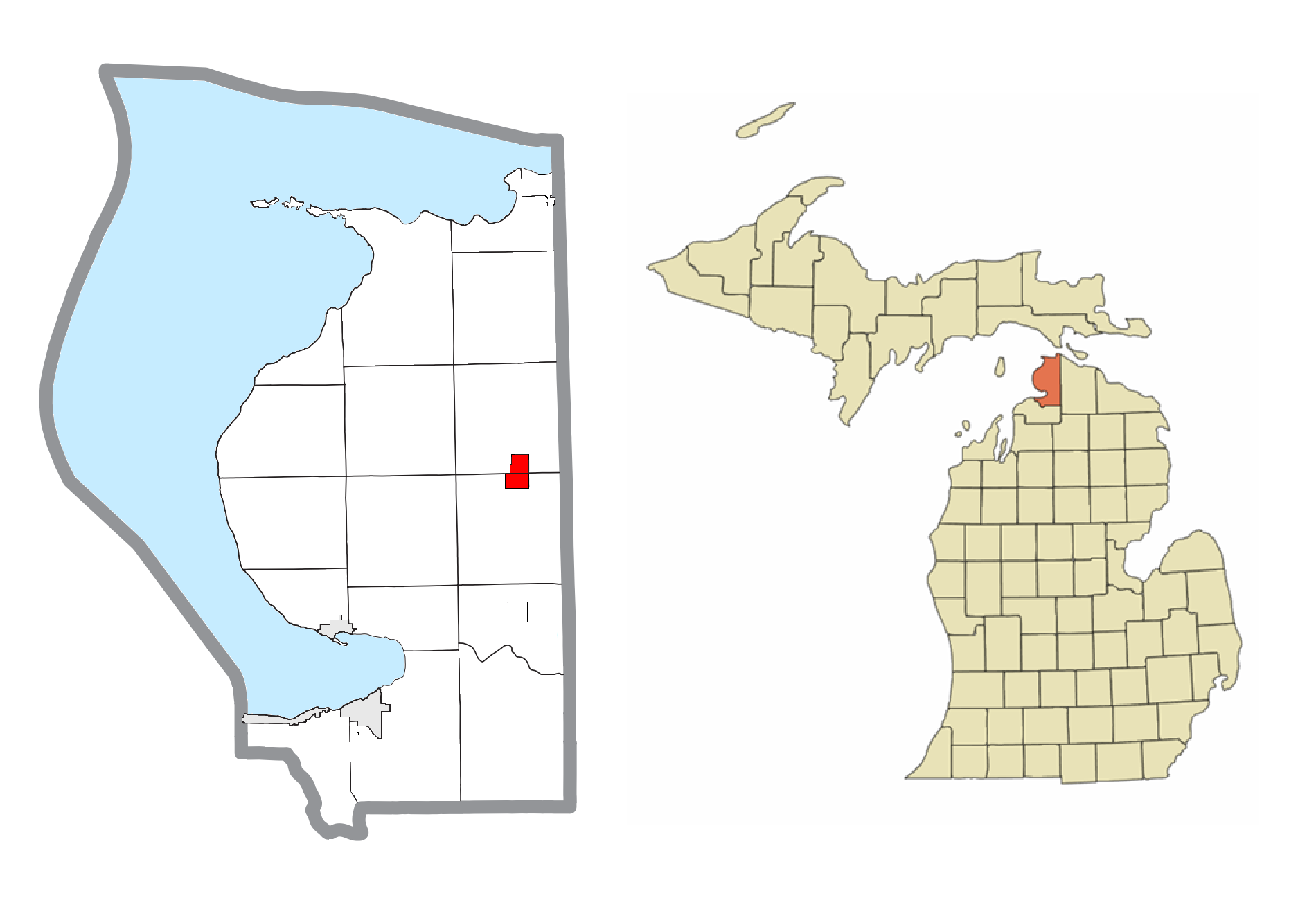
- Location within Emmet County

- Location within the state of Michigan
- Coordinates: 45°33′14″N 84°47′04″W
- Country: United States
- State: Michigan
- County: Emmet
- Townships: Maple River and McKinley

Government
  - Type: Village council
  - President: James Gillett
  - Clerk: Becky O’Neil

Area
  - Total: 1.95 sq mi (5.05 km^{2})
  - Land: 1.95 sq mi (5.05 km^{2})
  - Water: 0 sq mi (0.00 km^{2})
- Elevation: 699 ft (213 m)

Population (2020)
  - Total: 774
  - Density: 396.9/sq mi (153.25/km^{2})
- Time zone: UTC-5 (Eastern (EST))
  - Summer (DST): UTC-4 (EDT)
- ZIP code(s): 49769
- Area code: 231
- FIPS code: 26-63300
- GNIS feature ID: 0634571
- Website: Official website

Pellston (/ˈpɛl.stən/ PELL-stən) is a village in Emmet County in the U.S. state of Michigan. As of the 2020 census, Pellston had a population of 774. The village is the home of Pellston Regional Airport.

The village lies on the boundary between Maple River and McKinley townships on US Highway 31. Interstate 75 is about 10 miles (16 km) east of Pellston. Mackinaw City and the Mackinac Bridge are approximately 18 miles (29 km) north and Petoskey is about 20 miles (32 km) southwest of the village. The University of Michigan Biological Station is on nearby Douglas Lake.

== Demographics ==
Historical population
Census	Pop.	Note	%±
1910	1,089		—
1920	915		−16.0%
1930	810		−11.5%
1940	562		−30.6%
1950	442		−21.4%
1960	429		−2.9%
1970	469		9.3%
1980	565		20.5%
1990	583		3.2%
2000	771		32.2%
2010	822		6.6%
2020	774		−5.8%
U.S. Decennial Census

The University of Michigan has its biological station in Pellston.

=== 2010 census ===
As of the census of 2010, there were 822 people, 308 households, and 216 families residing in the village. The population density was 430.4 inhabitants per square mile (166.2/km^{2}). There were 364 housing units at an average density of 190.6 per square mile (73.6/km^{2}). The racial makeup of the village was 86.5% White, 0.2% African American, 8.0% Native American, 0.1% Asian, 0.2% from other races, and 4.9% from two or more races. Hispanic or Latino of any race were 1.9% of the population.

There were 308 households, of which 41.9% had children under the age of 18 living with them, 47.1% were married couples living together, 16.6% had a female householder with no husband present, 6.5% had a male householder with no wife present, and 29.9% were non-families. 24.0% of all households were made up of individuals, and 7.4% had someone living alone who was 65 years of age or older. The average household size was 2.67 and the average family size was 3.13.

The median age in the village was 34.1 years. 30.8% of residents were under the age of 18; 7.6% were between the ages of 18 and 24; 25.4% were from 25 to 44; 26.9% were from 45 to 64; and 9.2% were 65 years of age or older. The gender makeup of the village was 48.8% male and 51.2% female.

=== 2000 census ===
As of the census of 2000, there were 771 people, 260 households, and 199 families residing in the village. The population density was 402.8 inhabitants per square mile (155.5/km^{2}). There were 308 housing units at an average density of 160.9 per square mile (62.1/km^{2}). The racial makeup of the village was 89.75% White, 0.65% African American, 6.49% Native American, 0.26% Asian, 0.13% Pacific Islander, and 2.72% from two or more races. Hispanic or Latino of any race were 0.78% of the population.

There were 260 households, out of which 43.5% had children under the age of 18 living with them, 60.0% were married couples living together, 11.2% had a female householder with no husband present, and 23.1% were non-families. 16.9% of all households were made up of individuals, and 5.8% had someone living alone who was 65 years of age or older. The average household size was 2.97 and the average family size was 3.33.

In the village, the population was spread out, with 33.3% under the age of 18, 6.9% from 18 to 24, 32.6% from 25 to 44, 18.3% from 45 to 64, and 8.9% who were 65 years of age or older. The median age was 31 years. For every 100 females, there were 98.7 males. For every 100 females age 18 and over, there were 94.0 males.

The median income for a household in the village was $37,292, and the median income for a family was $39,911. Males had a median income of $25,956 versus $20,013 for females. The per capita income for the village was $13,047. About 10.8% of families and 13.7% of the population were below the poverty line, including 14.0% of those under age 18 and 13.0% of those age 65 or over.

== Geography ==
According to the United States Census Bureau, the village has a total area of 1.91 square miles (4.95 km^{2}), all land.

=== Climate ===
According to the Köppen Climate Classification system, Pellston has a humid continental climate, abbreviated "Dfb" on climate maps.

Climate data for Pellston Regional Airport, Michigan (1991–2020 normals, extremes 1948–present)
Month	Jan	Feb	Mar	Apr	May	Jun	Jul	Aug	Sep	Oct	Nov	Dec	Year
Record high °F (°C)	53 (12)	61 (16)	85 (29)	91 (33)	94 (34)	99 (37)	98 (37)	98 (37)	96 (36)	87 (31)	78 (26)	64 (18)	99 (37)
Mean daily maximum °F (°C)	26.7 (−2.9)	28.7 (−1.8)	38.5 (3.6)	51.7 (10.9)	66.1 (18.9)	75.8 (24.3)	79.3 (26.3)	77.9 (25.5)	70.2 (21.2)	56.6 (13.7)	43.5 (6.4)	32.6 (0.3)	54.0 (12.2)
Daily mean °F (°C)	17.8 (−7.9)	18.0 (−7.8)	27.0 (−2.8)	39.5 (4.2)	52.2 (11.2)	61.9 (16.6)	66.0 (18.9)	64.7 (18.2)	57.3 (14.1)	45.9 (7.7)	35.2 (1.8)	25.2 (−3.8)	42.6 (5.9)
Mean daily minimum °F (°C)	8.9 (−12.8)	7.3 (−13.7)	15.5 (−9.2)	27.2 (−2.7)	38.3 (3.5)	48.1 (8.9)	52.8 (11.6)	51.6 (10.9)	44.5 (6.9)	35.2 (1.8)	27.0 (−2.8)	17.7 (−7.9)	31.2 (−0.4)
Record low °F (°C)	−37 (−38)	−37 (−38)	−34 (−37)	−14 (−26)	11 (−12)	25 (−4)	28 (−2)	29 (−2)	19 (−7)	4 (−16)	−23 (−31)	−31 (−35)	−37 (−38)
Average precipitation inches (mm)	1.61 (41)	1.14 (29)	1.74 (44)	2.44 (62)	2.79 (71)	2.57 (65)	2.67 (68)	2.85 (72)	3.38 (86)	4.22 (107)	2.71 (69)	1.89 (48)	30.01 (762)
Average precipitation days (≥ 0.01 in)	15.1	11.2	10.2	11.1	11.4	10.5	9.9	9.8	12.0	15.7	14.8	15.4	147.1
Source: NOAA

== Education ==
Pellston Public Schools is the area school district.

== Transportation ==
Indian Trails provides daily intercity bus service between St. Ignace and East Lansing, Michigan.

Pellston Regional Airport serves the city. Delta Air Lines provides airline service to Detroit Metropolitan Wayne County Airport.

== Images ==
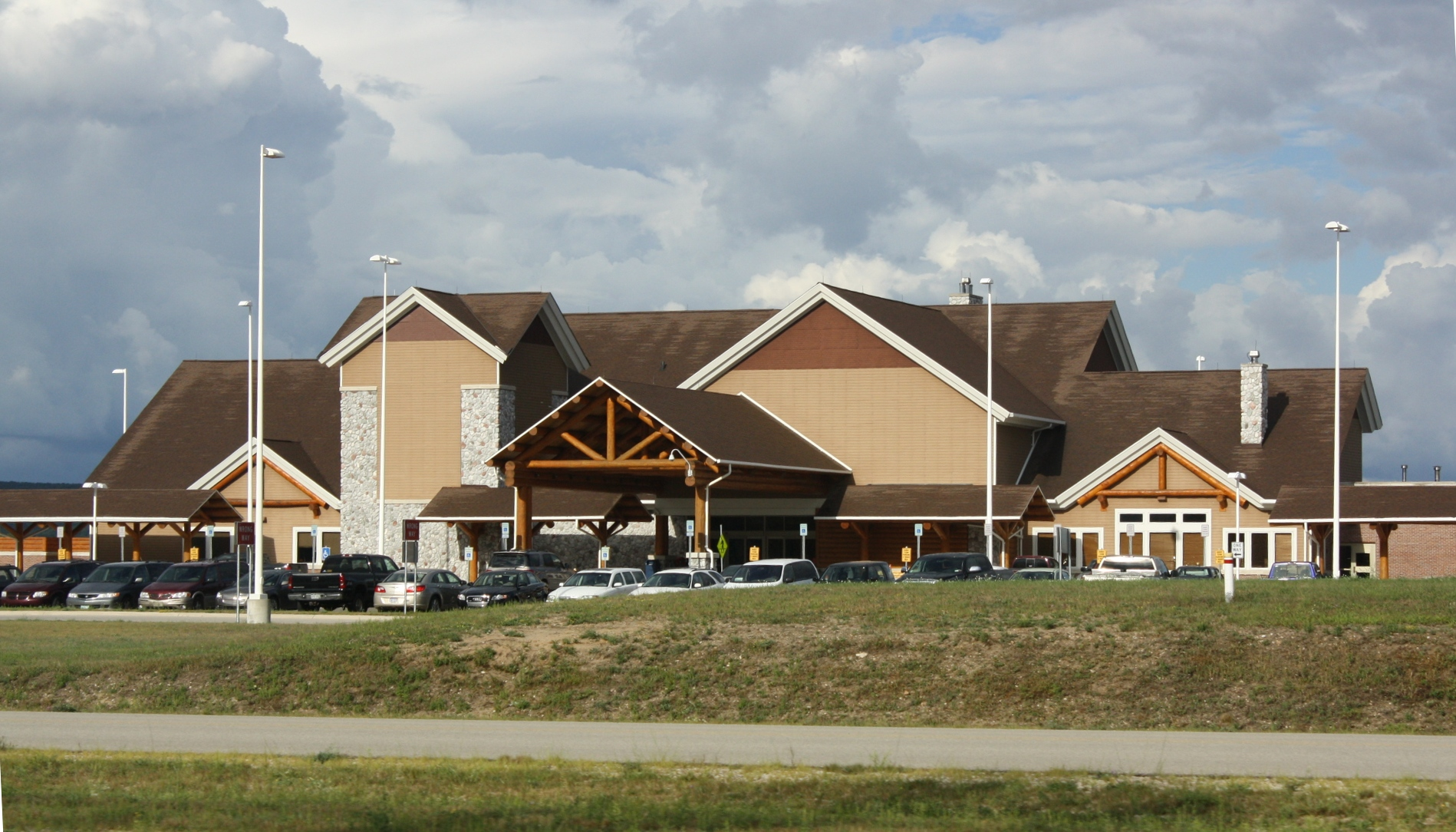
Pellston Regional Airport

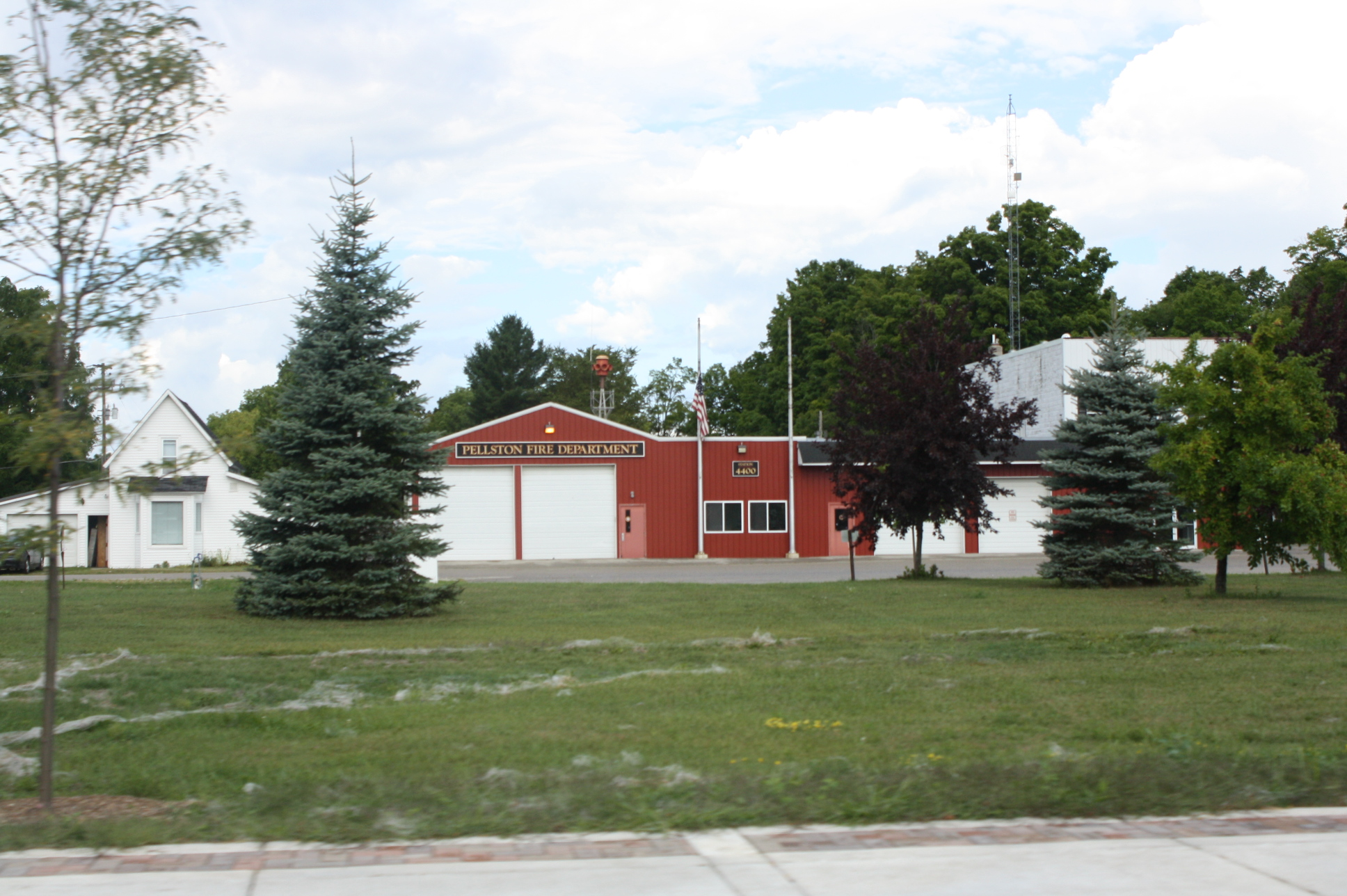
Fire department

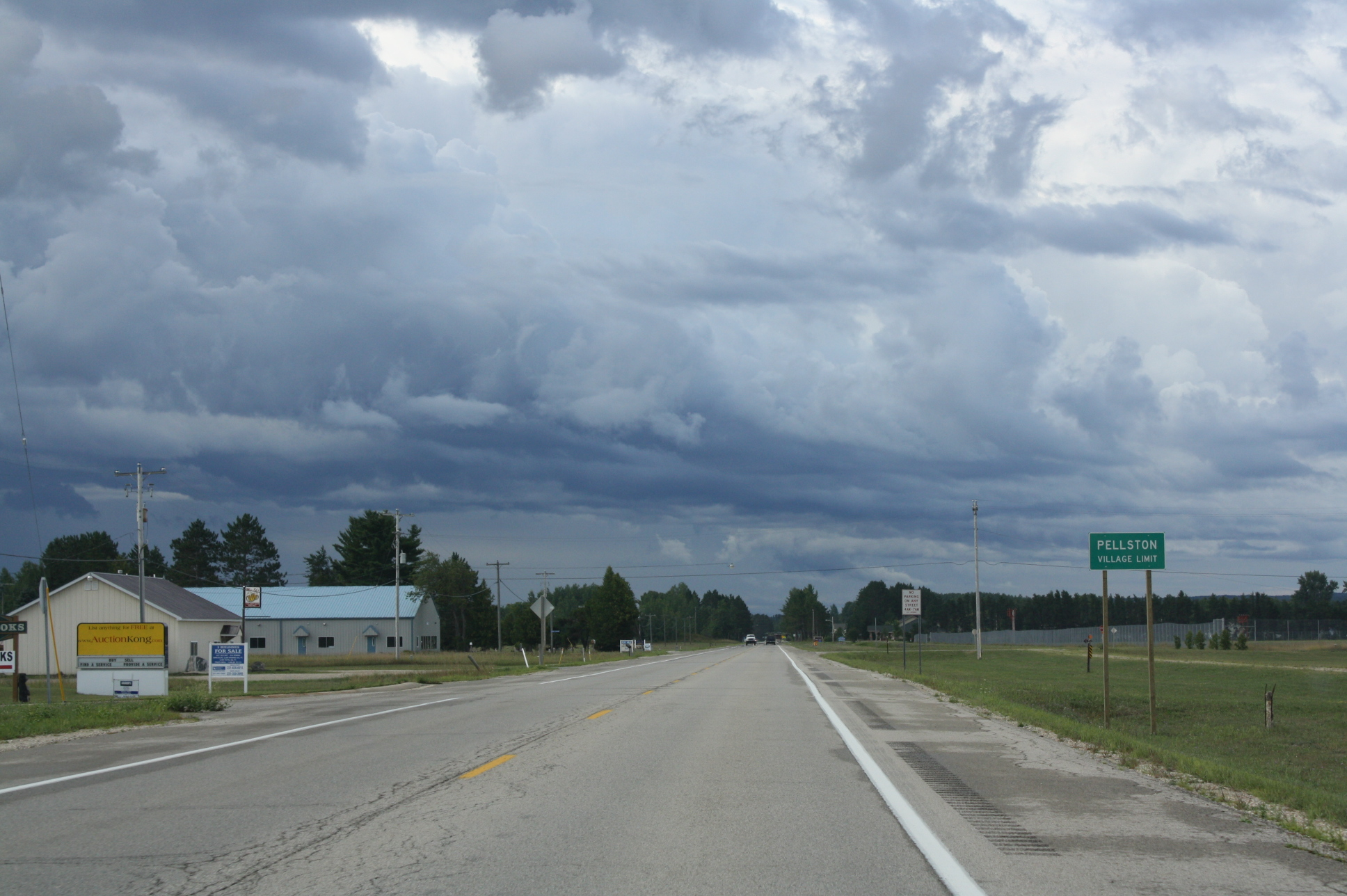
Sign on US 31

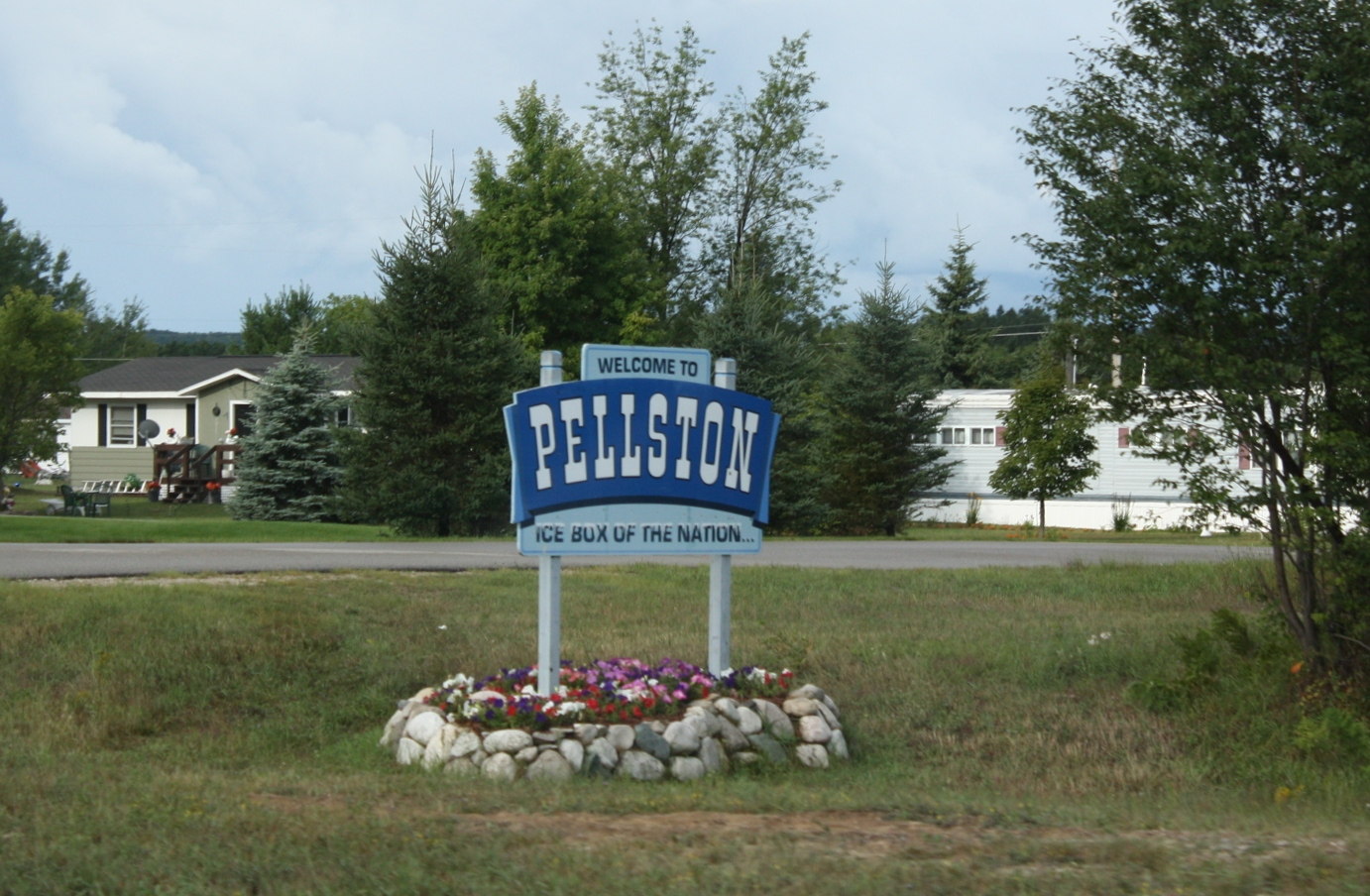
City welcome sign

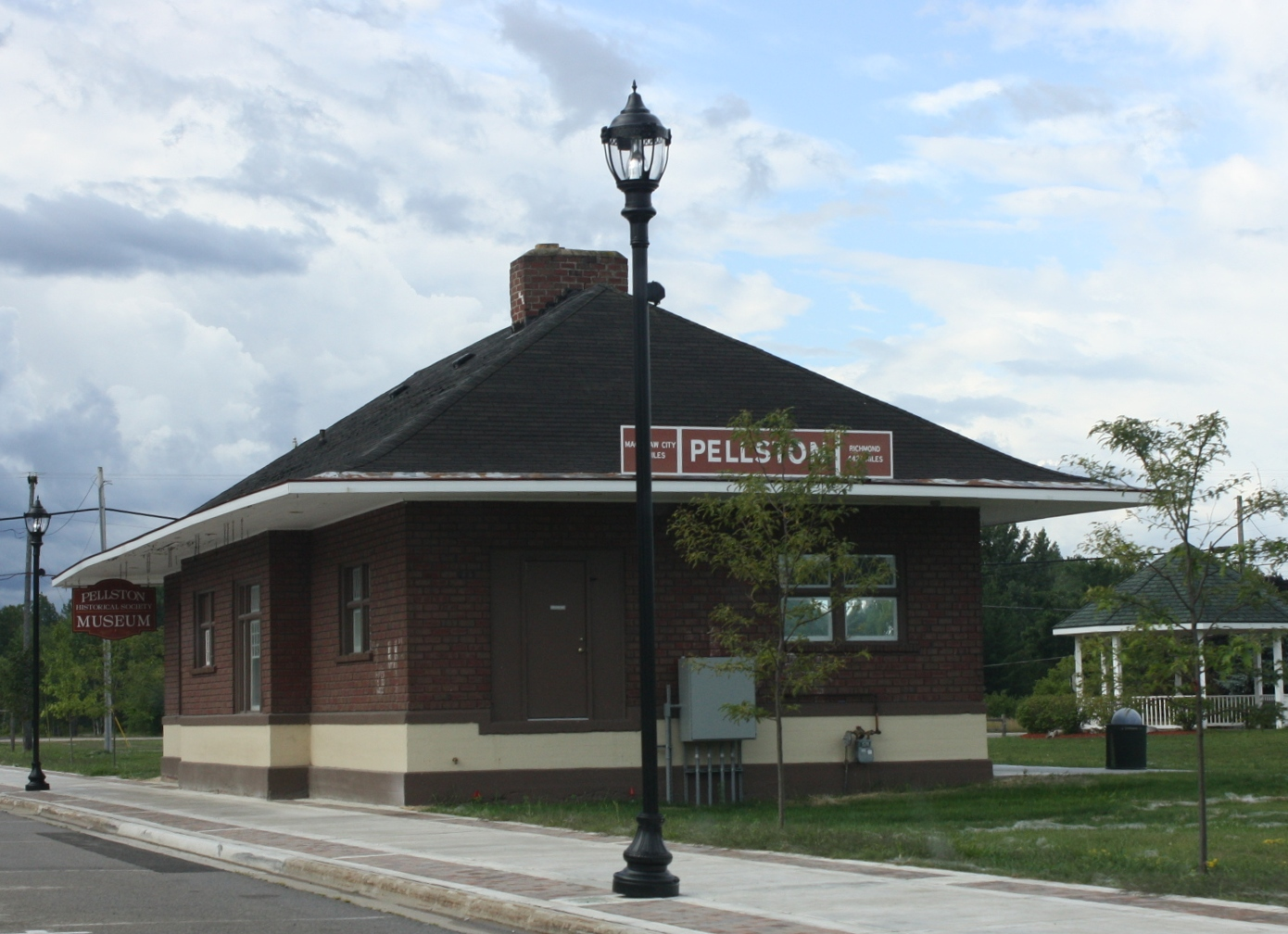
Pellston Historical Society Museum
