= Au Gres =

Au Gres may refer to a location in the United States:

- Au Gres, Michigan
- Au Gres Township, Michigan
- The Au Gres River in Michigan
