= List of highways numbered 17 Business =

Route 17 Business or Highway 17 Business may refer to:

- I-17 Business (former)
- M-17 Business loop (former)
