= U.S. Route 23 in Michigan =

U.S. Highway in Michigan

US Highway 23
- US 23 highlighted in red

Route information
- Maintained by MDOT
- Length: 362.152 mi (582.827 km)
- Existed: November 11, 1926–present
- Tourist routes: Lake Huron Circle Tour; Huron Shores Heritage Route

Major junctions
- South end: US 23 / US 223 near Lambertville
- I-94 near Ann Arbor; I-96 in Brighton; I-75 near Flint; I-69 in Flint; US 10 in Bay City; I-75 near Standish
- North end: I-75 near Mackinaw City

Location
- Country: United States
- State: Michigan
- Counties: Monroe, Washtenaw, Livingston, Genesee, Saginaw, Bay, Arenac, Iosco, Alcona, Alpena, Presque Isle, Cheboygan, Emmet

Highway system
- United States Numbered Highway System; List; Special; Divided; Michigan State Trunkline Highway System; Interstate; US; State; Byways
← M-22	→ Bus. US 23

US Highway 23 (US 23) is a north–south United States Numbered Highway that runs from Jacksonville, Florida, to Mackinaw City, Michigan. In the state of Michigan, it is a major, 362-mile-long (583 km), north–south state trunkline highway that runs through the Lower Peninsula. The trunkline is a freeway from the Michigan–Ohio state line near Lambertville to the city of Standish, and it follows the Lake Huron shoreline from there to its northern terminus. Serving the cities of Ann Arbor and Flint, US 23 acts as a freeway bypass of the Metro Detroit area. Overall, the highway runs through rural areas of the state dominated by farm fields or woodlands; some segments are urban in character in the Ann Arbor, Flint and Tri-Cities areas. The section from Flint north to Standish also carries Interstate 75 (I-75) along a concurrency that includes a segment that carries almost 70,000 vehicles on a daily basis.

The first transportation routes along what is now US 23 in the state were sections of two Indian trails. In the early 20th century, four different auto trail names were applied to roads now a part of the highway. These roads were included as part of two state highways in the initial state highway system in 1919. When the United States Numbered Highway System was first designated on November 11, 1926, the new US 23 replaced the other designations along its route. Since creation, the road has been moved and realigned several times. Through the 1930s and 1940s, the lakeshore routing was created to replace a path that ran further inland through the northern portion of the state. Starting in the early 1950s, various sections in the southeastern and central areas of the Lower Peninsula were upgraded to freeways, bypassing several major cities in the area. These improvements were completed by the end of the 1960s. Since then a new crossing of the Saginaw River at Zilwaukee was built to replace a drawbridge that carried the I-75/US 23 freeway over a shipping channel.

Various memorial or tourist route designations have been applied to US 23 in the state since the 1980s. The highway has been a part of the Lake Huron Circle Tour since the creation of the Great Lakes Circle Tours in 1986. The non-freeway section was designated the Sunrise Side Coastal Highway by the Michigan Department of Transportation (MDOT) in 2004 as a part of what is now the Pure Michigan Byway Program. Since 2009, it has been called the Huron Shores Heritage Route. The highway has also carried two memorial designations related to war veterans and a third related to local civic leaders since a 2001 consolidation of related legislation in the state. MDOT has listed two of the highway's bridges on its historic bridge list, one of which is also on the National Register of Historic Places (NRHP). Future improvements to the route of US 23 include a proposed northerly extension of the freeway from Standish to one of several locations along the Lake Huron shoreline. Another freeway has been proposed in the Flint area that could connect US 23 directly to the south end of I-475.

== Route description ==
US 23 runs for 362.152 miles (582.827 km) through the Lower Peninsula of Michigan, serving as a freeway bypass to the west of Metro Detroit and a scenic highway through the northern portion of the state along Lake Huron. Between Flint and Standish, US 23 runs concurrently with I-75; the combined freeway section from Flint to Bay City can contain between six and eight lanes total while the rest of the US 23 freeway is mostly four lanes. Non-freeway segments of US 23 in the state are two lanes. Like other state trunkline highways, it is maintained by the Michigan Department of Transportation (MDOT). All of US 23 in the state south of the M-32 junction in Alpena has been listed on the National Highway System, a network of roads important to the country's economy, defense, and mobility. From the Standish area north, the highway is also a part of the Lake Huron Circle Tour and the Huron Shores Heritage Route, a Pure Michigan Byway.

=== Southeastern Michigan ===
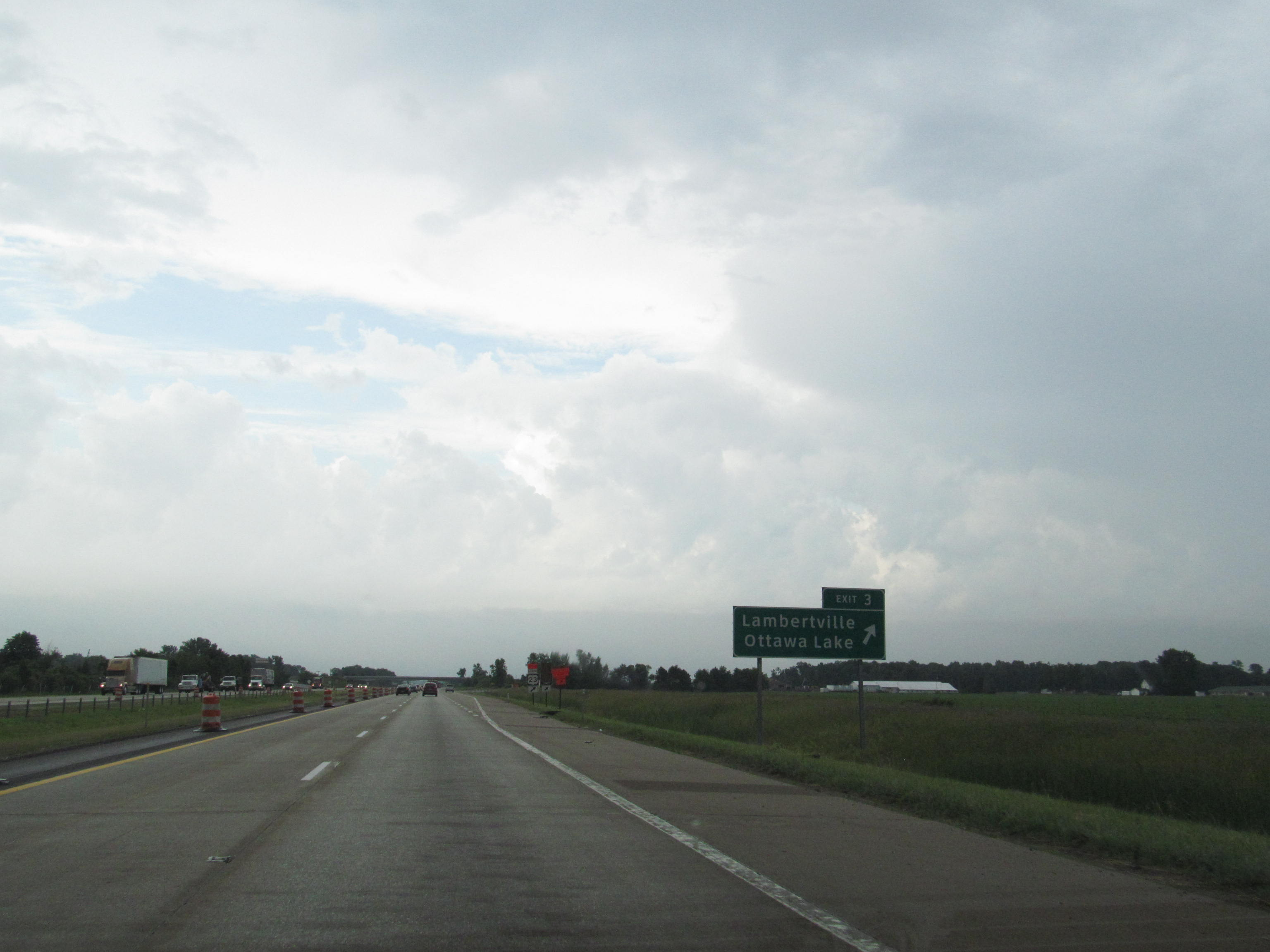
Freeway approaching exit 3 in southern Monroe County

US 23 enters Michigan on a freeway northwest of Toledo, Ohio, concurrent with US 223. This freeway runs north through farm fields in rural western Monroe County near Lambertville. About five miles (8.0 km) north of the state line, US 223 leaves the freeway and turns west onto St. Anthony Road; US 23 continues northward on the freeway. South of Dundee, US 23 crosses the River Raisin before coming to an interchange with M-50 next to the Cabela's store west of town. North of town, the freeway passes near an industrial area. Farther north, it crosses a line of the Ann Arbor Railroad near Azalia as the trunkline runs to the east of Milan at the Monroe-Washtenaw county line. North of Milan, the freeway crosses a line of the Norfolk Southern Railway.

The landscape takes on a more suburban residential character as the freeway approaches the Ann Arbor area. There are separate interchanges for US 12 (Michigan Avenue) and I-94 on the southeast side of the city. Between I-94 and Washtenaw Avenue, US 23 carries the Business Loop I-94 (BL I-94) moniker as well. That secondary designation leaves the freeway and runs west on Washtenaw Avenue into downtown Ann Arbor and the campus of the University of Michigan. At the same interchange, a Business US 23 (Bus. US 23) designation also follows Washtenaw Avenue to the west; east of US 23, M-17 follows Washtenaw Avenue and connects the freeway with Ypsilanti. North of this interchange, US 23 crosses the Huron River near the campus of the local community college and continues north to a junction with the M-14 freeway. The two merge and run westward along the north side of the city before US 23 turns north and M-14 curves south.

North of Ann Arbor, the freeway runs through woodlands and near several lakes and features a flex route system allowing traffic to use the inner shoulder during peak times. In the community of Whitmore Lake, US 23 crosses into Livingston County near the city's namesake body of water. East of Brighton, the freeway intersects I-96 and continues north to an intersection with M-59 south of Hartland. The highway turns northeasterly by Runyon Lake and runs toward the city of Fenton. The trunkline passes through town and bends back toward the northwest, running between lakes Ponemah and Fenton. Continuing north, the environment around US 23 transitions to rural farm fields as the freeway approaches the south side of the Flint area.

=== Flint and the Tri-Cities area ===
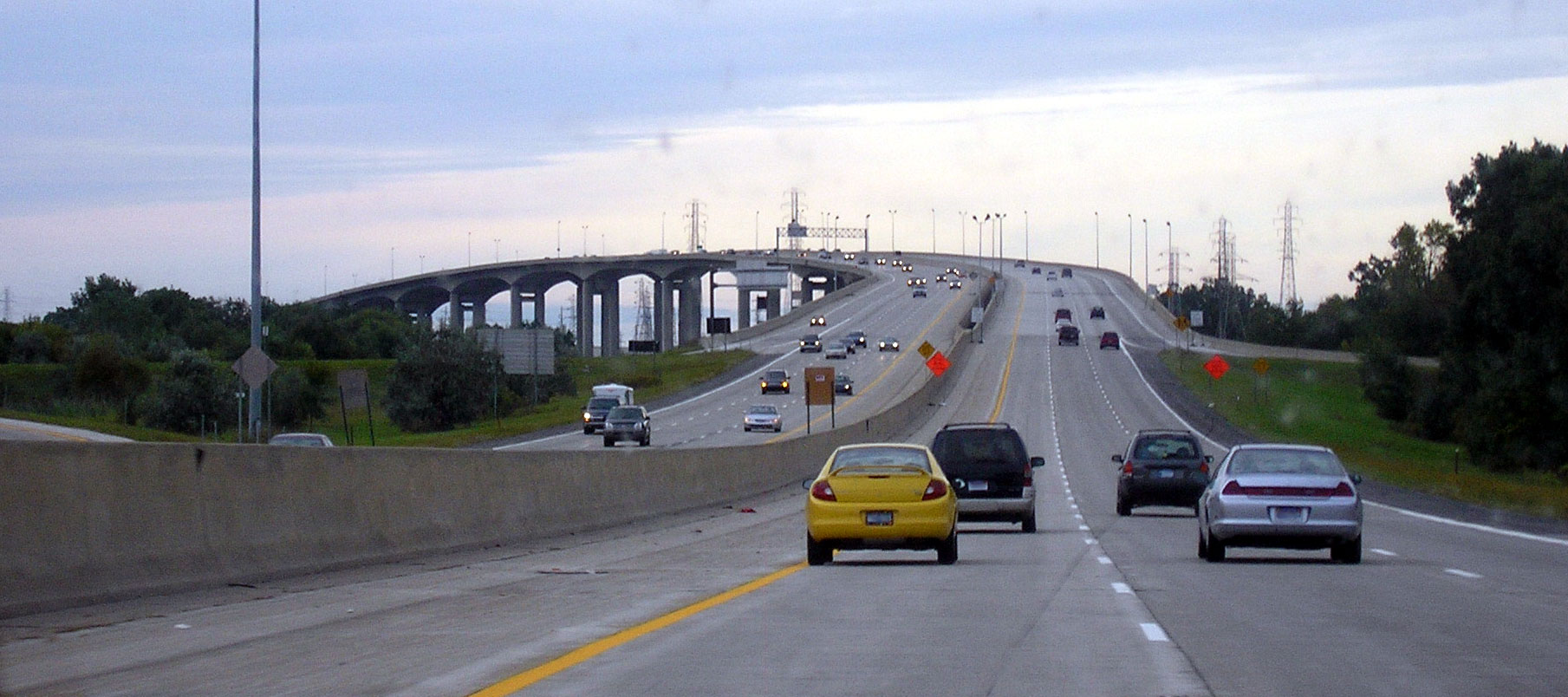
I-75/US 23 northbound approaching the Zilwaukee Bridge near Saginaw

West of Grand Blanc, US 23 meets I-75, and the two freeways merge near the Bishop International Airport and continue along the west side of the Flint metro area. I-75/US 23 has an interchange with I-69 near the crossing with the Canadian National Railway line. Continuing northwards through suburban residential areas, the highway crosses the Flint River while running along the west side of the city. In Mount Morris Township, the freeway intersects the northern end of I-475 before meeting M-57 near Clio. The highest traffic totals along US 23 in the state of Michigan were recorded by MDOT near the M-57 interchange; in 2009 an average 68,800 vehicles used that section of freeway daily. These traffic counts are expressed in terms of annual average daily traffic (AADT), which is a statistical calculation of the average daily number of vehicles on a segment of roadway.

Near Birch Run, the highway turns northwesterly next to a large outlet mall. Between here and the Saginaw area, the freeway runs through more wooded lands, crossing the Cass River near Bridgeport. I-75/US 23 enters the Tri-Cities (named for Saginaw, Bay City and Midland) when it bypasses Saginaw to the east. The freeway intersects M-46 in Buena Vista Township south of the junction with I-675. North of downtown Saginaw, the freeway crosses the Saginaw River on the Zilwaukee Bridge, a "post-tensioned, segmental, [concrete] box girder bridge" that is "infamous" for a series of "construction mishaps, cost overruns, and government foibles."

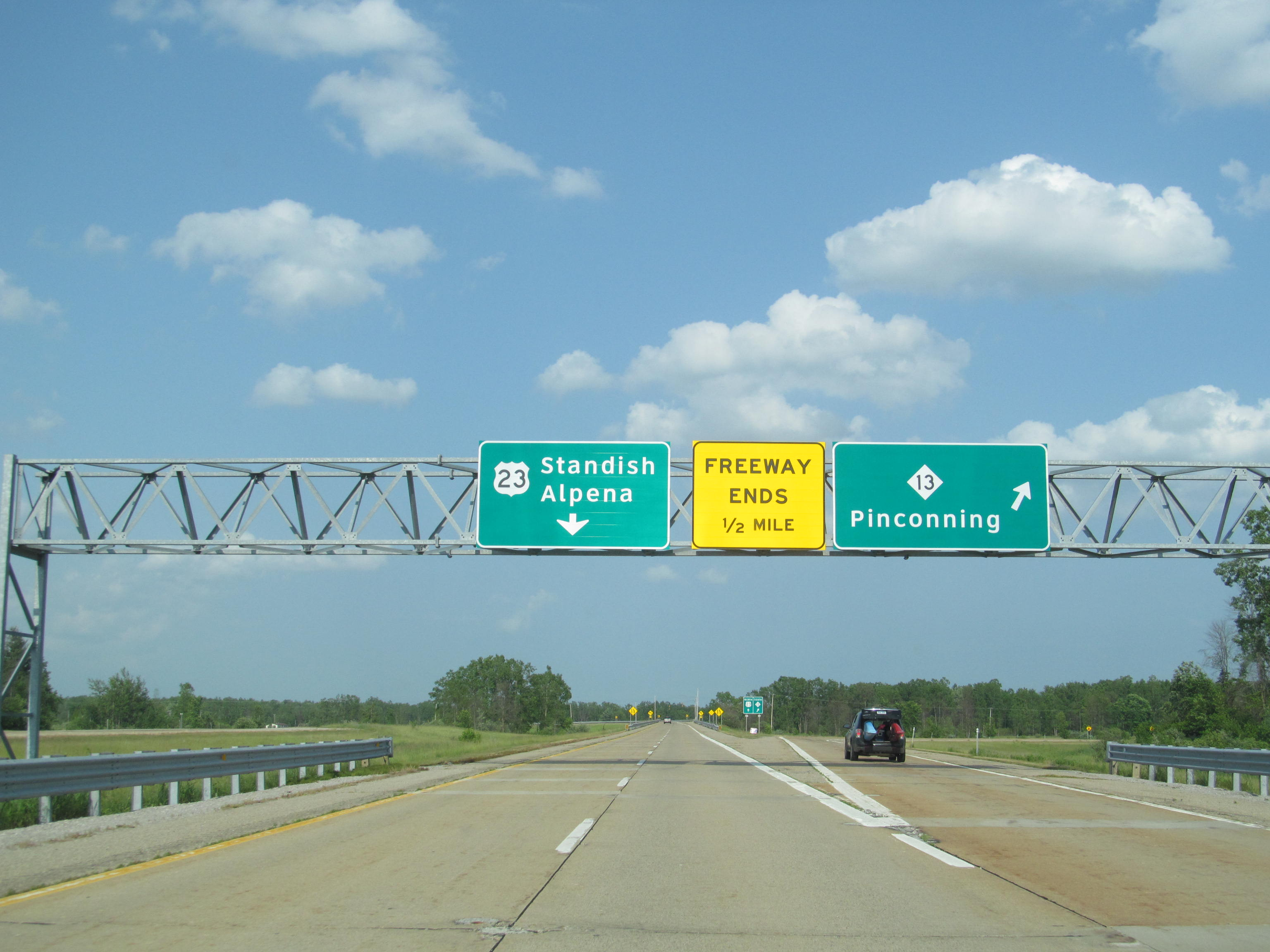
Northern end of the freeway near Standish

Past the bridge, I-75/US 23 meets the northern end of I-675 and continues through fields and woods to the Bay City area. At exit 162, the freeway meets the eastern terminus of US 10 and the western terminus of M-25 west of downtown. The next interchange north is with the Connector M-13 (CONN M-13) freeway, which was the previous northern end of US 23's freeway in Michigan. The connector runs due northward, and I-75/US 23 turns northwesterly to bypass around Kawkawlin. The highway veers north, crosses the Kawkawlin River and the Pinconning Creek before coming to an interchange southwest of Standish. There, US 23 curves east, separating from I-75. US 23 continues for about three miles (4.8 km) as a freeway which ends at the intersection with M-13 south of Standish. The lowest AADT along any freeway section of US 23 in Michigan is the section immediately east of I-75; here the traffic levels drop from 20,763 to 4,466 vehicles per day after US 23 separates from I-75.

=== Northern Michigan ===
US 23 runs north from the end of its freeway along Huron Road through the community of Standish. The trunkline turns northeasterly through lakeshore woodlands after the intersection with Old M-76. Northeast of this intersection, the highest, non-freeway AADT level on US 23 was recorded by MDOT at 16,757 vehicles daily. Running through Omer, the highway crosses the Rifle River and a line of the Lake State Railway. In between the two crossings, it curves due east on its way out of town. At Hale Road, US 23 meets the southern end of M-65 before it continues east to Au Gres, where it runs along the Saginaw Bay and crosses the Au Gres River. Huron Road meanders northward along the lakeshore, staying inland near Point Lookout. US 23 runs through woods as it follows the Saginaw Bays shoreline northeasterly through Alabaster to Tawas City. The highway intersects the eastern terminus of M-55, runs north and east around Tawas Bay to East Tawas and follows the Lake Huron shoreline to Oscoda. Through this area, US 23 runs parallel to the Lake State Railway and crosses into the Huron National Forest.

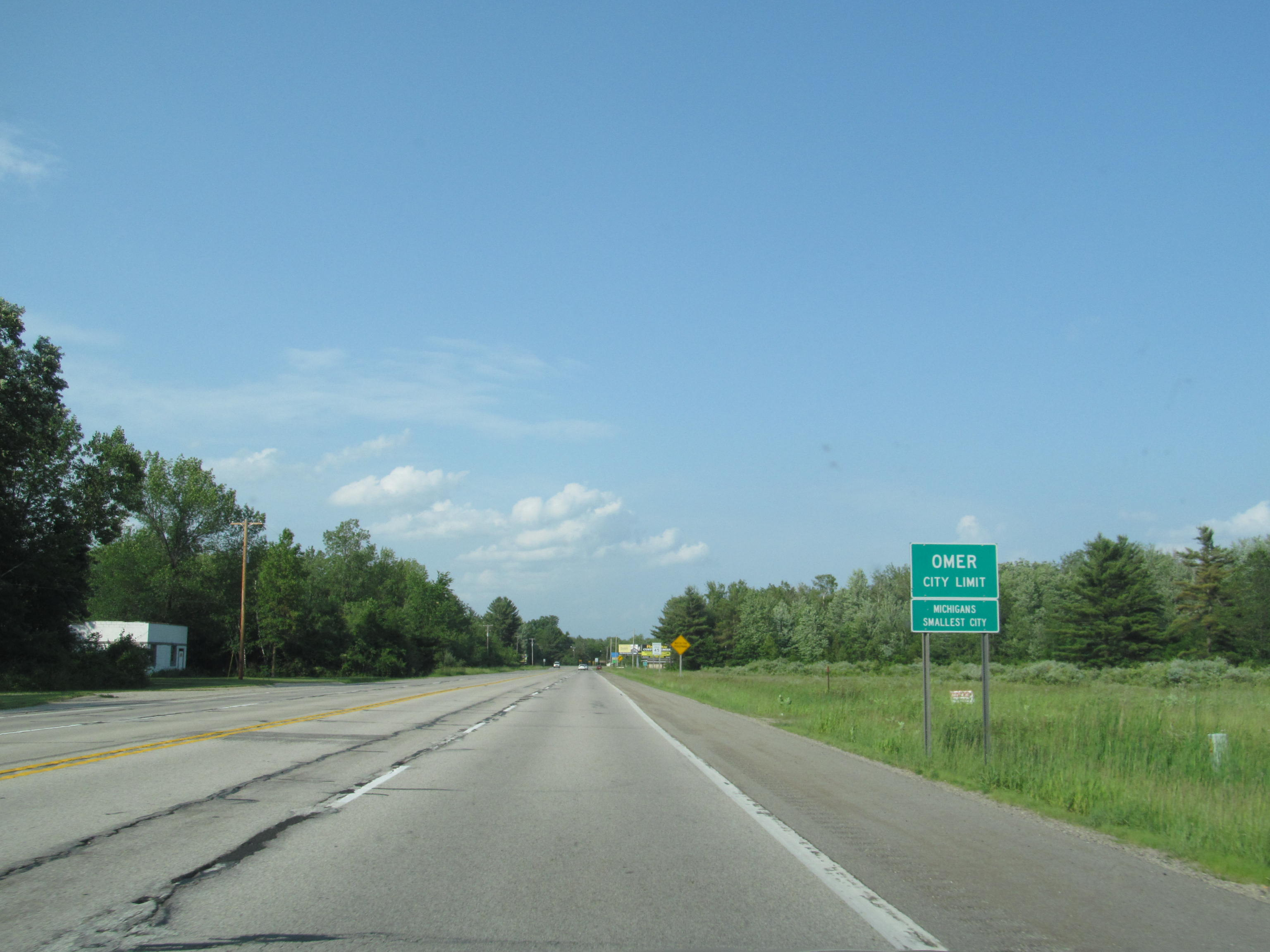
Welcome sign at Omer

Oscoda is the location of the eastern termini of both the River Road National Scenic Byway and County Road F-41. In between those two junctions, the highway crosses the Au Sable River near its mouth, and the trunkline passes by the former Wurtsmith Air Force Base. Huron Road continues north, running next to Van Etten Lake as it leaves the national forest. Further north, it runs along Cedar Lake when it crosses into Alcona County. The highway meets the eastern termini of F-30 and M-72 in Greenbush and Harrisville respectively. It also passes Harrisville State Park in the latter community. The highway shifts a bit further inland north of Harrisville, continuing to parallel the railroad through the Mackinaw State Forest. Near Ossineke, the trunkline turns back toward the lake, running along the shoreline of Thunder Bay.

When US 23 enters Alpena, it follows State Avenue through town and turns northwesterly on Chisholm Street. The intersections of Chisholm Street with Second and Third avenues mark the eastern terminus of M-32. Chisholm Street runs along the Thunder Bay River and crosses the river near Lake Besser. The highway leaves town and runs through rural woodlands to the south shore of Long Lake, curving around the eastern side of the lake. Near the northern end of the lake, US 23 crosses into Presque Isle County and runs along the west shore of Grand Lake. At the north end of that lake, the highway turns west along the Lake Huron shoreline near Thompson's Harbor State Park. The trunkline continues to Rogers City where it bypasses town to the south and west, intersecting F-21 and M-68 in the process; Bus. US 23 runs through downtown. On the other side of Rogers City, US 23 runs along the lake past Hoeft State Park and along Hammond Bay before crossing into Cheboygan County. This area had the lowest AADT levels in 2009 at 1,097 vehicles per day.

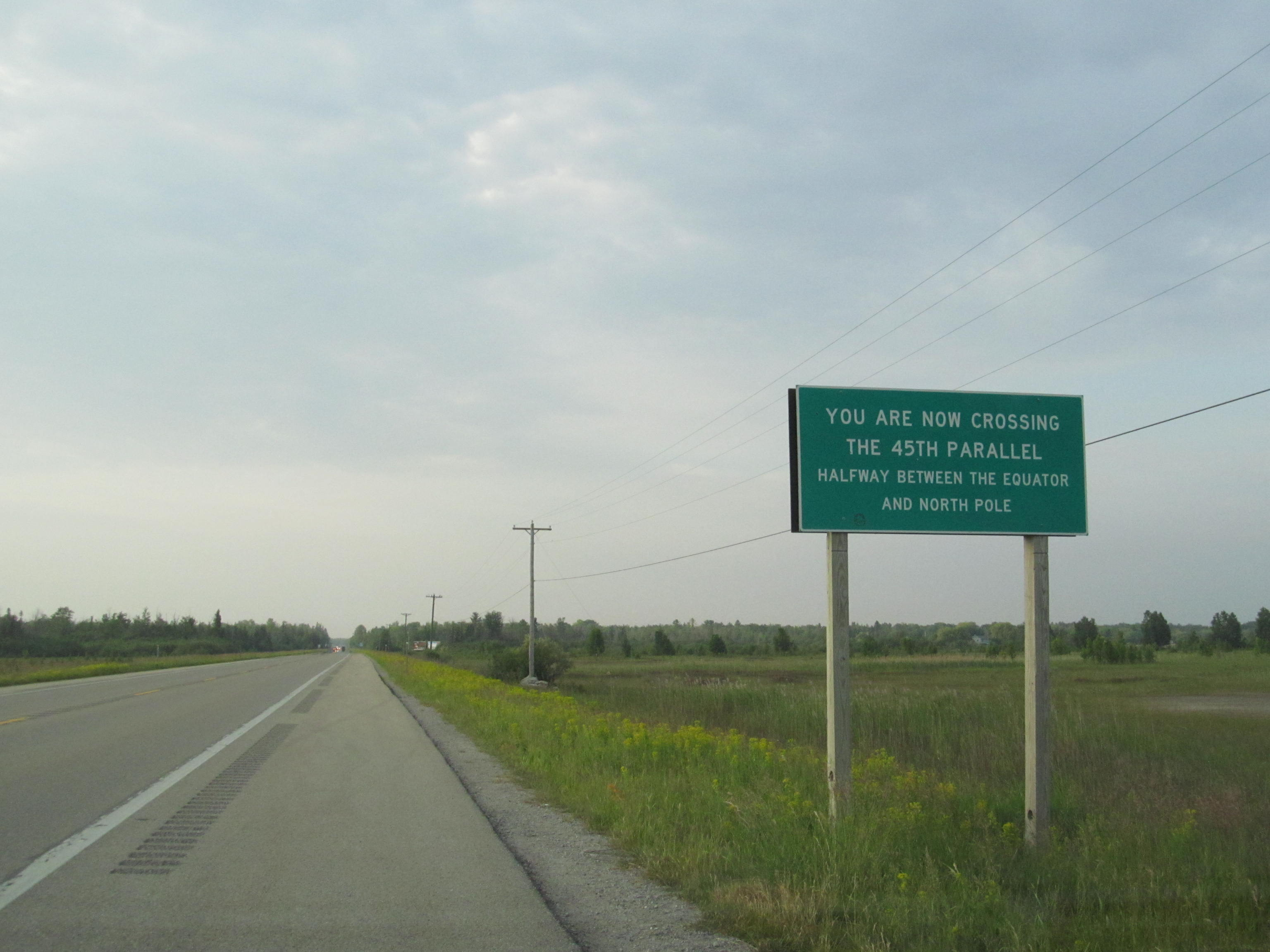
Sign where US 23 crosses the 45th parallel north

US 23 follows the Lake Huron shoreline through Cheboygan County through woodlands past Cheboygan State Park and Duncan Bay. On the eastern edge of Cheboygan the highway intersects F-05 before following State Street through a commercial district. State Street crosses the Cheboygan River on the Cheboygan Bascule Bridge near the mouth of the river and the dock for the USCGC Mackinaw. On the west side of the river, US 23 meets the northern terminus of M-27 at the intersection with Main Street. State Street continues westerly as C-66 as US 23 turns north on Main Street for a block before resuming west on Mackinaw Avenue. The highway continues along the lake toward Mackinaw City. As it approaches the village, it passes Dousman's Mill and several motels. At Nicolet Street in town, the highway crosses into Emmet County for the short distance to the highway's national northern terminus at I-75's exit 338.

== History ==
=== Early history ===
Highway markers for the Dixie Highway (left) and Theodore Roosevelt International Highway (right), both of which predate the modern highway

Before Michigan became a state, the first land transportation corridors were the Indian trails. The original Shore Trail ran roughly parallel to the route of the modern-day US 23 from the Bay City area to Cheboygan. Another section of the current highway followed the Saginaw Trail between Flint and Saginaw.

Later, during the auto trail era, the modern-day US 23 also coincided with the east branch of the Dixie Highway and part of the Lower Peninsula section of the Theodore Roosevelt International Highway. The Dixie Highway was created by William S. Gilbreath after he developed the Lincoln Highway. The highway was designed to link the Great Lakes with the Gulf of Mexico, and to commemorate a half century of peace between the North and the South after the American Civil War. At the urging of Governor Woodbridge N. Ferris, the northern terminus was located at the Straits of Mackinac. The highway had two branches in the Lower Peninsula; the eastern branch followed what later became US 23 north of Standish. The Theodore Roosevelt International Highway was named for former US president Theodore Roosevelt after his death in 1919. Overall, this highway ran from Portland, Oregon, to Portland, Maine, by way of Michigan and the Canadian province of Ontario. In Michigan, it also followed US 23 north of Standish.

The highway was also part of the East Michigan Pike, designed to be a counterpart of the West Michigan Pike on the other side of the Lower Peninsula. The original route of the East Michigan Pike included a section along the coast of The Thumb between Bay City and Port Huron and used the same route as the Dixie Highway north of Bay City. Backers of this auto trail lost out in terms of name recognition to the Dixie Highway, relegating the East Michigan Pike to the list of failed auto trails. The southern part of what is now US 23 in the state was also part of the auto trail craze. The Top of Michigan Trail was designated in 1917 from the state line north to the Bay City area, before turning inland along other roadways. The name faded from shortly after the time the Michigan State Highway Department (MSHD) (Note: The Michigan State Highway Department was reorganized into the Michigan Department of State Highways and Transportation on August 23, 1973, and the name was later shortened to its current form in 1978.) assigned the first highway numbers in the state.

The first state highways along the US 23 corridor were numbered M-65 from the Ohio line north to the Flint area and M-10 from Flint north to Mackinaw City by July 1, 1919. (Note: The first state highways in Michigan were signed in 1919.) When originally designated, M-65 was in two sections: the southern segment ran from the Ohio state line north to the Dundee area; the northern section ran between Ann Arbor and Flint by way of Brighton and Fenton. The gap between the two segments was eliminated by the middle of 1926.

=== United States Numbered Highways ===
US 23 was commissioned on November 11, 1926, with the debut of the United States Numbered Highway System. The MSHD removed the M-10 and M-65 designations from the highway at the time. As it was originally designated, US 23 crossed into Michigan from Ohio south of Temperance and ran north to Ypsilanti via Ida and Maybee. Once the highway entered Ann Arbor, it followed the roads that preceded the modern-day freeway up to Flint. From Flint to Saginaw, US 23 ran concurrently with US 10. On the way north to Bay City, the highway ran on the west side of the Saginaw River before turning north to the Standish area. From Standish to Mackinaw City, US 23 initially took a more inland route through the northeastern Lower Peninsula.

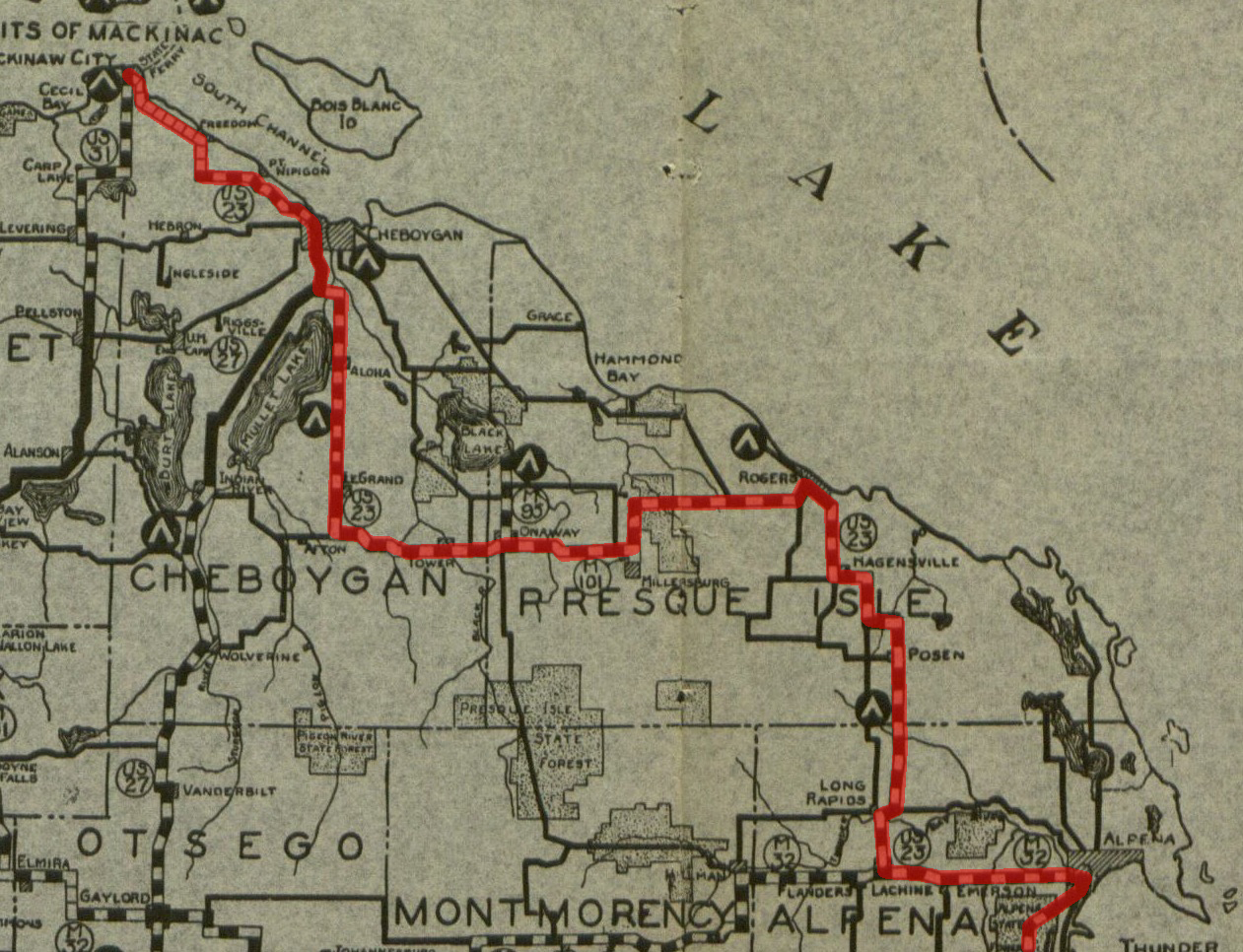
Original 1920s routing of US 23 between Cheboygan and Alpena highlighted in red

Starting in 1929, MSHD started updating the route that US 23 followed through the Lower Peninsula. Late that year, the routing was moved to the east side of the Saginaw River, and M-47 was extended along the former course on the west side of the river. During 1930, a set of changes realigned the highway's route through the southeast corner of the state. Near Ida, US 23 was rerouted along M-50 to Dundee and north through Milan to Ann Arbor, bypassing Maybee and Whittaker. US 23 was moved from its inland routing between Omer and Tawas City via Whittemore to follow a shoreline alignment by way of Au Gres along Saginaw Bay around 1932; the former route through Twining and Whittemore became an extension of M-65 and the section from Whittemore east to Tawas City was added to M-55 as a part of these changes.

In 1932, US 23 was moved closer to the lakeshore between Spruce and Alpena; the former routing was redesignated M-171. The highway was also moved to a route closer to the lakeshore between Tawas City and Oscoda, with part of the old inland route taking the designation Old US 23. A few years later in 1936, US 23 replaced M-72 between Oscoda and Harrisville and followed a new roadway north to the Spruce area. The M-171 designation was removed from its original routing and applied to the 1932 routing of US 23 by way of Mikado and Lincoln. In the middle of 1937, US 27 was extended concurrently along US 23 between Cheboygan and Mackinaw City. Around the end of the decade, US 23's routing was moved in another location to follow the lakeshore; this time the highway was rerouted between Alpena and Rogers City. M-65 was extended northwards from Lachine through Posen to terminate over the former US 23 routing.

US 23 was moved to its current lakeshore routing between Rogers City and Cheboygan in 1940, and M-33 was extended westerly from Onaway to Afton and north to Cheboygan over the former US 23 roadway while M-68 was extended eastward through Onaway to Rogers City. In early 1941, a bridge across the Saginaw River connecting Salzburg and Lafayette avenues in Bay City was added to the route of US 23 in the city; at the same time the former routing was redesignated Bus. US 23. The highway was also realigned between Hartland and Fenton in 1941. By 1945, the northernmost segment of M-65 in downtown Rogers City was redesignated Bus. US 23, and M-65 was truncated to its junction with US 23 southeast of town, removing the concurrency that existed since 1940. North of Dundee, a more direct alignment to Azalia was added to US 23, turning the former routing back to local control in late 1947 or early 1948; at the same time, the last gravel section of the highway was paved near Hammond Bay in northwestern Presque Isle County.

=== Freeway conversion ===
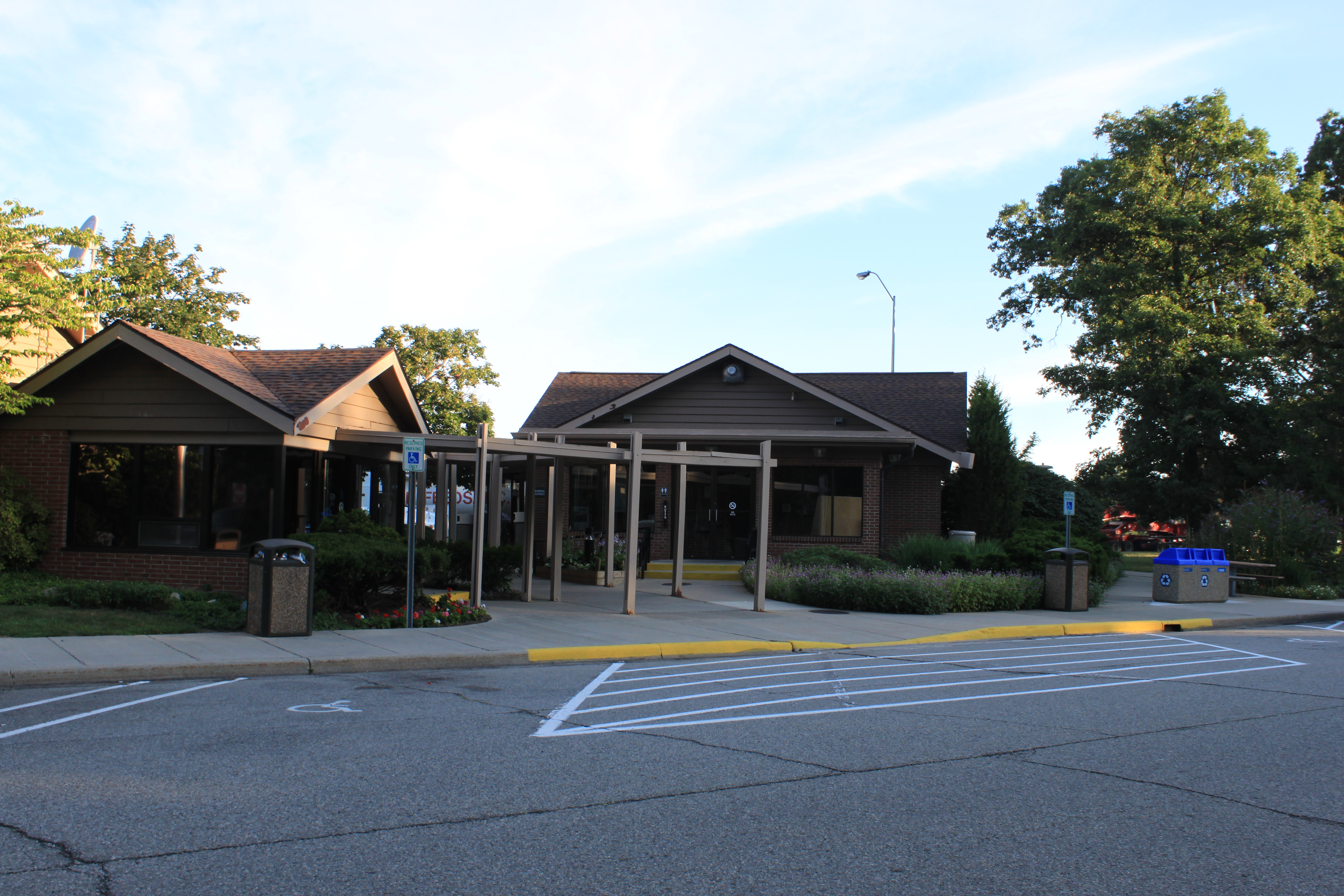
Rest area and welcome center near Samaria in Monroe County

One of the first pieces of what would later become part of US 23's freeway route was completed in late 1951 or early 1952, when a two-lane bypass was built around the eastern side of Milan. Two years later, a similar bypass was built from Bridgeport to M-81 on the east side of Saginaw, with the old route becoming a Bus. US 23 designation. Both bypasses would later be upgraded to four-lane freeways by 1961, with the Saginaw one later incorporated into the route of I-75. When the Mackinac Bridge opened on November 1, 1957, US 23, US 27 and US 31 were extended along the access roadways to the foot of the bridge.

The first future freeway portion of US 23 was built in 1957 from north of Ann Arbor to Whitmore Lake as a divided highway. On June 30, 1958, the first stretch of the "Fenton–Clio Expressway" opened, stretching from Fenton to Birch Run. The freeway connection from Dundee south to Ohio was opened on October 1, 1959. In late 1959, the portion from Flint to Birch Run also gained the I-75 designation.

In late 1960 or early 1961, a new I-75/US 10/US 23 freeway was built from the north end of the Saginaw bypass to Kawkawlin, utilizing the Zilwaukee drawbridge (later replaced by the Zilwaukee Bridge) over the Saginaw River; when it opened, MSHD extended M-13 along the former route of US 23 from the northside of Saginaw into Bay City to the end of the freeway at Kawkawlin. Another section connected the Whitmore Lake area with Brighton in the same timeframe. General Motors was bidding in 1961 to construct an electronic highway. US 23 between Ann Arbor and Toledo was under consideration to be the location of this project; the testing for such a roadway was ultimately done at Ohio State University instead. By the end of the year, freeway sections opened to bypass Saginaw south and ran south to Birch Run, another connected south from Fenton to Hartland, and a third connected Milan with Dundee. The remaining gaps were eliminated with additional freeway openings in 1962: Brighton to Hartland opened in September, and Milan to Ann Arbor opened in November. The I-75/US 23 freeway north of the Kawkawlin area to Standish opened in 1967, and M-13 was shown on maps following US 23's former route through Linwood and Pinconning after the change.

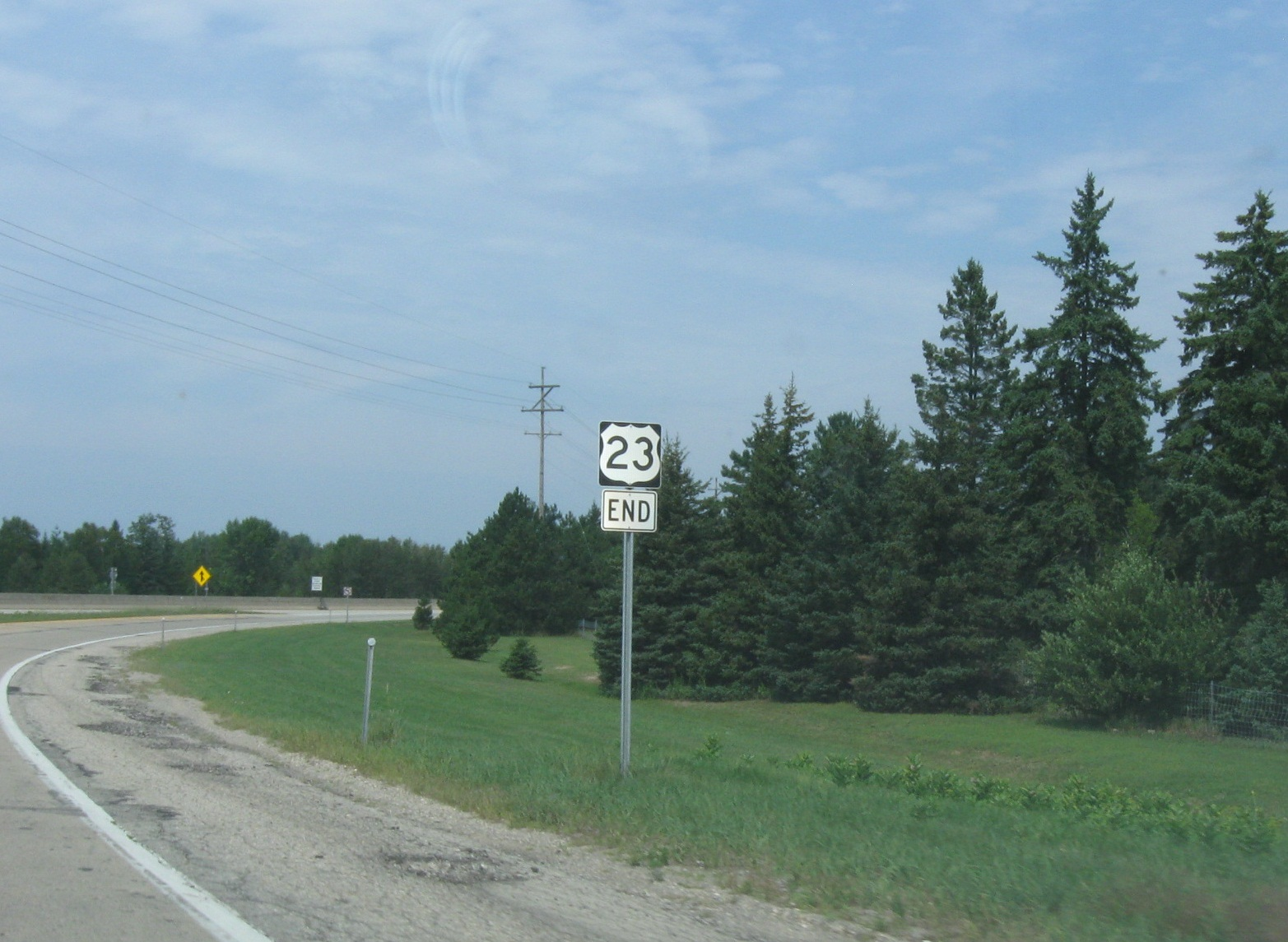
Northern terminus in Mackinaw City

The MSHD requested additional Interstate Highway mileage in 1968 under the Federal-Aid Highway Act of 1968 including a freeway along US 23 between Standish and Mackinaw City. This extension was rejected by Congress on December 13, 1968; instead, Michigan was allotted additional mileage for an extension of I-69 to Flint. Once the last piece of I-75 was completed along the M-76 corridor in November 1973, the I-75 designation was extended north of Bay City on US 23.

The MSHD first proposed a realignment of US 223 in 1965; this change would reroute that highway to replace M-151 in southern Monroe County, and use the US 23 freeway to connect to Sylvania, Ohio. The rerouting change was made in 1977 when Michigan shifted its segment of US 223 as proposed twelve years prior. Instead of running south through Ottawa Lake, US 223 continued east to the US 23 freeway and south into Ohio.

The original bridge across the Saginaw River at Zilwaukee was built in 1960 as a bascule bridge to allow shipping traffic to use the river. Opening the drawbridge would back traffic up on I-75/US 10/US 23 for upwards of four hours on holiday weekends. Approved in 1974, construction on the replacement bridge started in October 1979. A major construction accident in August 1982 delayed completion of the new Zilwaukee Bridge; a bridge pier partially collapsed when contractors overloaded a section under construction. The affected 300-foot (91 m) deck segment tilted to rest three feet (0.91 m) higher on one end and five feet (1.5 m) lower on the other. The structure was originally supposed to cost $76.8 million with a 1983 completion date; in the end it cost $131.3 million (equivalent to $300 million in 2024) when the southbound span finally opened on September 19, 1988. The structure is the largest segmental concrete bridge in the country.

While that construction was being done, MDOT truncated US 10 at Bay City in 1986; this removed the concurrency between US 10 and US 23 that existed since 1926. A few years later in 1992, the freeway concept for the northeastern LP was revived again when MDOT initiated plans to study and build a new US 23 freeway from Standish northerly to Tawas City, Oscoda or Alpena. This proposal was brought up due to a high level of tourist traffic along the current routing since the mid-1960s. The FHWA mandated additional environmental studies for the project in 2000, and MDOT withdrew the proposals two years later.

External videos
- US-23 Ann Arbor, Michigan - Flex Lanes at YouTube

In November 2016, construction work on a $92 million project began on the freeway between Ann Arbor and Whitmore Lake. This construction includes replacement of bridges and reconstruction of off ramps. A year later, the flex route system opened, using intelligent traffic management and electronic signs to monitor and redirect traffic. The system can open a temporary travel lane on the inner shoulder during rush hour. The flex route project was nationally recognized by American Association of State Highway and Transportation Officials (AASHTO) in 2018 for Operations Excellence. A $150 million extension to the interchange with I-96 began in 2023 and be completed in 2026.

In March 2022, construction work began at the northern end of the freeway portion of US 23 just south of the city of Standish. This removed a bridge and on-ramp at the end of the freeway, replacing it with a roundabout.

== Future ==
Officials in the Flint area have proposed extending a freeway to directly connect I-475 to US 23. Such an extension, if built, would "include a new freeway coming out of I-475, which would snake across Fenton and Cook roads before connecting into US 23 at Baldwin Road". Proposals for the freeway connection have been around since the late 1990s, but they were indefinitely postponed in 2011.

== Memorial highway designations and tourist routes ==
Most of US 23, along with US 2 in the Upper Peninsula, has been designated the United Spanish War Veterans Memorial Highway. The designation was conferred in Public Act 207 of 1945, with companion legislation for US 2 in 1949. Signs marking the highway were not erected until 1968 when Governor George W. Romney had them installed.

North of Standish, US 23 is a part of the Lake Huron Circle Tour (LHCT). This tour was created in May 1986 as part of the overall Great Lakes Circle Tour through a joint effort between MDOT and its counterparts in Wisconsin, Minnesota and Ontario.

When the Michigan State Legislature consolidated the statutes defining the various memorial highways in 2001, they included the Veterans of World War I Memorial Highway in the law. Defined along I-75/US 23 between Saginaw and Bay City, the designation was included in Public Act 142. That act also affected another previously designated moniker between the two cities. The Roberts-Linton Highway was named in 1931 for local leaders who championed the construction of a highway along the Saginaw River. This name was applied to the original highway routing between Saginaw and Bay City (now a part of M-13). After the 2001 change, the name was moved to the US 23 freeway.

In May 2004, the highway north of Standish was named the Sunrise Side Coastal Highway, a scenic highway designation through what is now called the Pure Michigan Byway Program. Since 2009, they local committee that manages the byway designation has started using the Huron Shores Heritage Route name for the corridor. At the end of 2011, the Northeast Michigan Council of Governments (NEMCOG) was working on funding a tourist promotion called "Telling Stories of the Sunrise Coast" through the US 23 Heritage Route Interpretive Program. Past efforts by NEMCOG included print media, logos, and other marketing efforts.

== Historic bridges ==
MDOT maintains a listing of the historic bridges in the state; along US 23, the department has listed two structures. The bridge over the Ocqueoc River in Ocqueoc Township in Presque Isle County was built in 1937. The 106-foot-long (32 m) structure is one of the last three deck truss bridges in the state. The roadway on the bridge is 38 feet (11.6 m) wide and carries two lanes of traffic. The bridge was reconstructed in 1994.

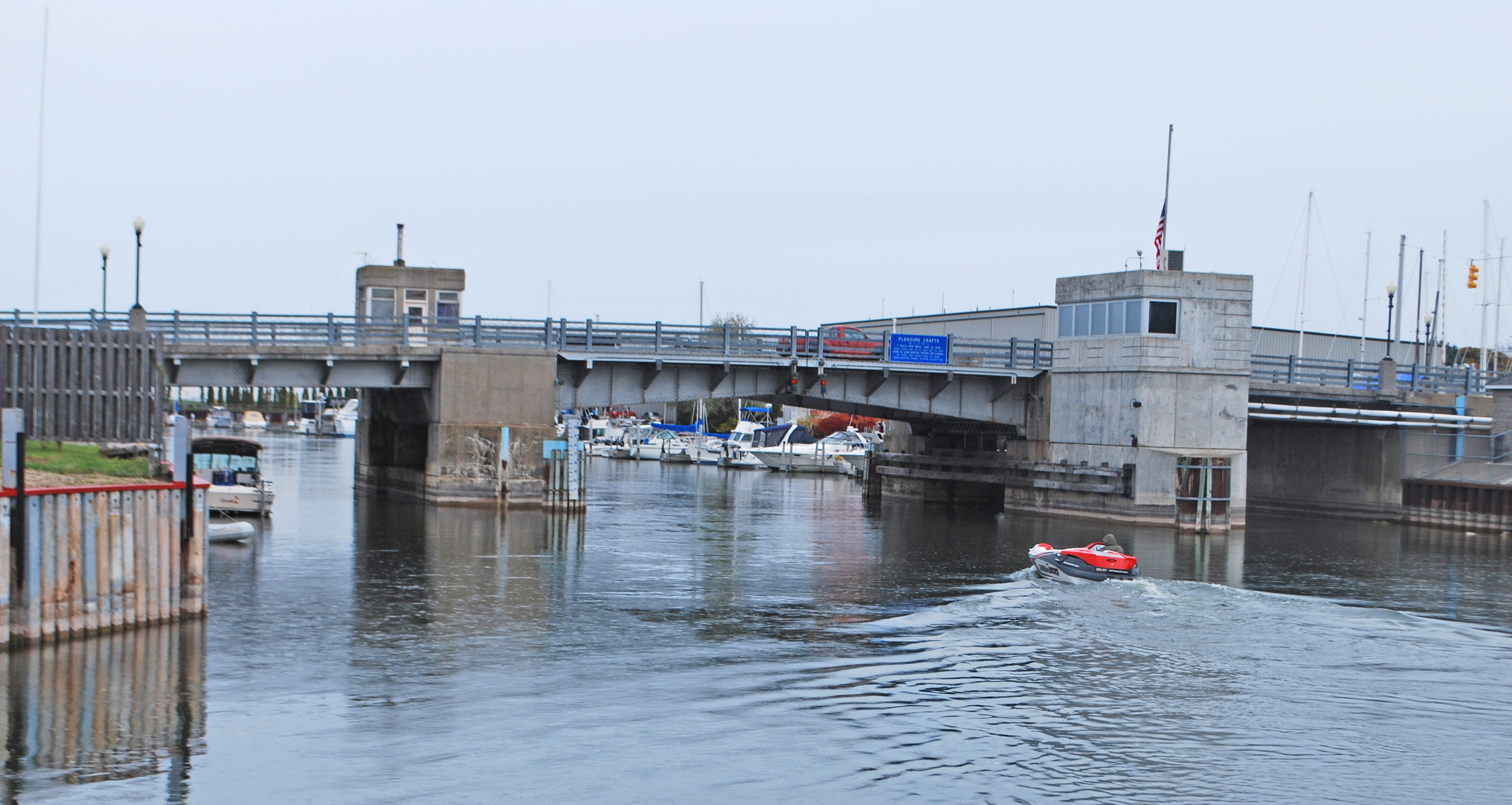
The drawbridge that carries US 23 across the Cheboygan River

The second bridge is the Cheboygan Bascule Bridge in Cheboygan. This bascule bridge was built in 1940 over the Cheboygan River as the last of its kind before World War II. It was built as a "two-leaf bridge in a place where a single-leaf bridge probably would have sufficed." The initial construction of the structure was delayed when the contractor died, but it was completed in December 1940. It was the second moveable bridge on the site, replacing an iron swing bridge built in 1877. The structure is 155 feet (47 m) long, composed of two 42-foot (13 m) spans on either side of the central 70-foot (21 m) span; the roadway is 40 feet (12 m) wide with four lanes for vehicle traffic. There are also pedestrian sidewalks on either side of the roadway. When the bridge is opened to allow river traffic to pass, boats have a 60-foot-wide (18 m) channel for navigation. The bridge was added to the National Register of Historic Places on December 1, 2000, and reconstructed in 2003.

== Exit list ==
County	Location	mi	km	Exit	Destinations	Notes
Monroe	Whiteford Township	0.000	0.000		US 23 south / US 223 south – Toledo	Ohio state line
Monroe	Whiteford Township	1.487	2.393	1	Sterns Road	
Monroe	Whiteford Township	2.980	4.796	3	Ottawa Lake, Lambertville	Connects to Consear Road
Monroe	Whiteford Township	5.098	8.204	5	US 223 north – Blissfield, Adrian	Northern end of US 223 concurrency
Monroe	Summerfield Township	8.711	14.019	9	Summerfield Road	
Monroe	Summerfield Township	13.75	22.13	13	Petersburg, Ida	Connects to Ida West Road
Monroe	Dundee Township	14.563– 15.315	23.437– 24.647	15	Lloyd Road	Northbound exit and southbound entrance via Dixon Road
Monroe	Dundee	16.685	26.852	17	M-50 – Dundee, Monroe	
Monroe	Milan Township	21.888	35.225	22	Cone Road – Azalia	
Monroe	Milan	25.133	40.448	25	Plank Road	
Washtenaw	Milan	26.674	42.928	27	Carpenter Road	
Washtenaw	York Township	30.638	49.307	31	Willis Road	
Washtenaw	Pittsfield Township	34.026	54.760	34	US 12 (Michigan Avenue) – Saline, Ypsilanti	Ypsilanti signed northbound only
Washtenaw	Ann Arbor	35.371– 35.382	56.924– 56.942	35	I-94 – Detroit, Chicago BL I-94 west	Southern end of BL I-94 concurrency; both directions use collector-distributor lanes; exit 180 on I-94
Washtenaw	Ann Arbor	37.395	60.181	37	BL I-94 west / Bus. US 23 north – Downtown Ann Arbor M-17 east – Ypsilanti	Northern end of BL I-94 concurrency; western terminus of M-17; signed as exits 37A (M-17, Ypsilanti) and 37B (BL I-94 and Bus. US 23, Ann Arbor); BL I-94 and Bus. US 23 signed northbound only
Washtenaw	Ann Arbor	38.901	62.605	39	Geddes Road	
Washtenaw	Ann Arbor	41.286	66.443	41	Plymouth Road	
Washtenaw	Ann Arbor	42.411– 42.856	68.254– 68.970	42	M-14 east – Plymouth, Livonia	Eastern end of M-14 concurrency; exit 8 on M-14
Washtenaw	Ann Arbor Township	44.873– 45.402	72.216– 73.067	45	Bus. US 23 south / M-14 west – Downtown Ann Arbor	Western end of M-14 concurrency; no exit number on M-14
Washtenaw	Northfield Township	49.137	79.078	49	North Territorial Road	
Washtenaw	Northfield Township	50.239	80.852	50	6 Mile Road	
Washtenaw	Northfield Township	52.217	84.035	52	Barker Road	Northbound exit and southbound entrance
Washtenaw–Livingston county line	Northfield–Green Oak township line	52.656	84.742	53	Hamburg, Whitmore Lake	Hamburg signed northbound only; connects to 8 Mile Road
Livingston	Green Oak Township	53.835	86.639	54	M-36 west – South Lyon, Pinckney	Signed as exits 54A (South Lyon) and 54B (M-36, Pinckney) northbound; eastern terminus of M-36
Livingston	Green Oak Township	55.549	89.397	55	Silver Lake Road	
Livingston	Green Oak Township	58.209	93.678	58	Lee Road – Brighton	Brighton signed northbound only, Lee Road signed southbound only
Livingston	Brighton	59.452– 59.643	95.679– 95.986	60	I-96 – Detroit, Brighton, Lansing	Signed as exits 60A (east) and 60B (west); exit 148 on I-96
Livingston	Hartland Township	67.387	108.449	67	M-59 – Howell, Pontiac	
Livingston	Hartland Township	70.464	113.401	70	Clyde Road – Clyde	
Livingston	Tyrone Township	74.625	120.097	75	Center Road	
Livingston	Tyrone Township	76.949	123.837	77	White Lake Road	
Genesee	Fenton	78.550	126.414	78	Owen Road – Fenton	
Genesee	Fenton	79.673	128.221	79	Silver Lake Road – Fenton, Linden	Former Bus. US 23
Genesee	Fenton	79.847	128.501	80	Torrey Road, North Road	Northbound ramps connect to Torrey Road; southbound ramps connect to North Road
Genesee	Fenton Township	83.888	135.005	84	Thompson Road	
Genesee	Mundy Township	87.678	141.104	88	Grand Blanc, Rankin	Connects to Grand Blanc Road
Genesee	Mundy Township	89.710	144.374	90	Hill Road	Connector to I-475; access to southbound I-75
Genesee	Mundy Township	90.225– 90.446	145.203– 145.559	115	I-75 south – Detroit	Southern end of I-75 concurrency; US 23 follows I-75 exit numbers; southbound exit and northbound entrance
Genesee	Flint	91.763	147.678	116	Bristol Road	Signed as exits 116A (east) and 116B (west) southbound; former M-121; exit to Bishop International Airport
Genesee	Flint Township	92.650– 93.091	149.106– 149.815	117	I-69 / Miller Road – Port Huron, Lansing	Signed as exits 117A (I-69) and 117B (Miller Road); exit 133 on I-69
Genesee	Flint Township	94.185	151.576	118	M-21 (Corunna Road) – Owosso	
Genesee	Mount Morris Township	97.397	156.745	122	Pierson Road – Flushing	
Genesee	Mount Morris Township	100.620– 101.275	161.932– 162.986	125	I-475 south – Downtown Flint	
Genesee	Mount Morris Township	101.421	163.221	126	Mt. Morris	Connects to Mt. Morris Road
Genesee	Vienna Township	105.507	169.797	131	M-57 – Clio, Montrose	
Saginaw	Birch Run	111.588	179.583	136	M-54 south / M-83 north – Birch Run, Frankenmuth	Northern terminus of M-54, southern terminus of M-83
Saginaw	Bridgeport Township	119.991	193.107	144	Frankenmuth, Bridgeport	Signed as exits 144A (Frankenmuth) and 144B (Bridgeport) northbound; connects to Dixie Highway
Saginaw	Buena Vista Township	124.714	200.708	149	M-46 (Holland Avenue) – Sandusky, Buena Vista	Signed as exits 149A (Sandusky) and 149B (Buena Vista)
Saginaw	Buena Vista Township	125.022	201.203	150	I-675 north – Downtown Saginaw	
Saginaw	Buena Vista Township	127.194	204.699	151	M-81 – Caro, Reese	
Saginaw	Buena Vista Township	128.406	206.649	153	M-13 (East Bay City Road) – Saginaw	
Saginaw	Saginaw River	128.041– 129.573	206.062– 208.528	Zilwaukee Bridge		
Saginaw	Zilwaukee	129.351	208.170	154	Zilwaukee	Connects to Adams Street
Saginaw	Zilwaukee Township	130.278– 130.304	209.662– 209.704	155	I-675 south – Downtown Saginaw	
Bay	Frankenlust Township	134.647	216.693	160	M-84 (Saginaw Road)	
Bay	Monitor Township	138.128– 138.140	222.295– 222.315	162	US 10 west – Midland M-25 east (BS I-75) – Downtown Bay City	Eastern terminus of US 10; western terminus of BS I-75/M-25; signed as exits 162A (east) and 162B (west); exit 140 on US 10
Bay	Monitor Township	139.412	224.362	164	Conn. M-13 north – Kawkawlin	Northbound exit and southbound entrance; southern terminus of Conn. M-13
Bay	Monitor Township	140.204	225.636	164	Wilder Road	Southbound exit and northbound entrance
Bay	Kawkawlin Township	144.374	232.347	168	Beaver Road	
Bay	Fraser Township	149.341	240.341	173	Linwood Road – Linwood	
Bay	Pinconning Township	157.353	253.235	181	Pinconning Road – Pinconning	
Arenac	Lincoln Township	163.906	263.781	188	I-75 north – Mackinac Bridge	Northern end of I-75 concurrency
Arenac	Standish Township	166.288	267.615	—	M-13 south / LHCT south – Pinconning	Southern end of LHCT concurrency; northern end of freeway; northern terminus of M-13; converted from interchange to roundabout in 2022
Arenac	Standish	168.672	271.451		M-61 west – Gladwin	Eastern terminus of M-61
Arenac	Standish	169.066	272.085		Old M-76 – Sterling	
Arenac	Arenac–Au Gres township line	177.138	285.076		M-65 north – Whittemore, Hale	Southern terminus of M-65
Iosco	Tawas City	204.565	329.215		M-55 west – West Branch	Eastern terminus of M-55
Iosco	Oscoda	220.181	354.347		River Road National Scenic Byway west	Eastern terminus of the River Road National Scenic Byway
Iosco	Oscoda	221.046	355.739		F-41 north – Oscoda–Wurtsmith Airport	Southern terminus of F-41
Alcona	Greenbush Township	232.193	373.678		F-30 west – Mikado	Eastern terminus of F-30
Alcona	Harrisville	236.989	381.397		M-72 west – Curran	Eastern terminus of M-72
Alcona	Caledonia Township	252.168	405.825		F-41 south (Barlow Road) – Lincoln	Northern terminus of F-41
Alpena	Alpena	267.740– 267.829	430.886– 431.029		M-32 west – Atlanta, Gaylord	Eastern terminus of M-32; M-32 follows a one-way pairing along Second (eastbound) and Third (westbound) avenues
Presque Isle	Pulawski Township	296.960	477.911		M-65 south – Posen	Northern terminus of M-65
Presque Isle	Rogers Township	302.806	487.319		Bus. US 23 north / LHCT north (Petersville Road) – Downtown Rogers City	Southern terminus of Bus. US 23; Petersville Road signed southbound only
Presque Isle	Rogers City	305.128	491.056		F-21 south – Hillman	Northern terminus of F-21
Presque Isle	Rogers City	305.398	491.490		M-68 (Erie Street) – Onaway, Downtown Rogers City	
Presque Isle	Rogers City	306.320	492.974		Bus. US 23 south / LHCT south (Third Street) – Downtown Rogers City	Northern terminus of Bus. US 23
Cheboygan	Benton Township–Cheboygan line	344.183	553.909		F-05 south (Eastern Street)	Northern terminus of F-05
Cheboygan	Cheboygan	346.327	557.359		M-27 south – Indian River C-66 west (State Street)	Northern terminus of M-27; eastern terminus of C-66
Cheboygan–Emmet county line	Mackinaw City	361.682	582.071		To I-75 south (Nicolet Street)	Former M-108 on the county line; access to southbound I-75
Emmet	Mackinaw City	361.881– 362.152	582.391– 582.827		I-75 north / GLCT – Mackinac Bridge	Northbound exit and southbound entrance; northern end of LHCT concurrency; exit 338 on I-75
1.000 mi = 1.609 km; 1.000 km = 0.621 mi: Concurrency terminus; Incomplete access

== See also ==
- Business routes of U.S. Route 23 in Michigan

== Notes ==
US Highway 23
Previous state: Ohio	Michigan	Next state: Terminus
