= Business routes of U.S. Route 23 in Michigan =

Routes of a highway in Michigan

Business US Highway 23
- Business routes of US 23 highlighted

Location
- Country: United States
- State: Michigan

Highway system
- United States Numbered Highway System; List; Special; Divided; Michigan State Trunkline Highway System; Interstate; US; State; Byways
← US 23	→ M-23

There have been five different business routes of US Highway 23 in the state of Michigan. These business routes were designated along former sections of US Highway 23 (US 23) to provide signed access from the main highway to the downtowns of cities bypassed by new routings of US 23. Two are still extant, connecting through downtown Ann Arbor and Rogers City. Three others have been decommissioned. The former Business US 23 (Bus. US 23) in Fenton was split in half during the 1970s and later completely turned back to local control in 2006. The former business loops through Saginaw and Bay City were renumbered as business loops of Interstate 75 in the 1960s.

== Ann Arbor ==
Business US Highway 23
- Location: Ann Arbor
- Length: 5.781 mi (9.304 km)
- Existed: 1962–present

Business US Highway 23 (Bus. US 23) is a business loop of US 23 through downtown Ann Arbor. The southern end is at an interchange with US 23 on the city line with Pittsfield Township. This interchange also marks the western terminus of M-17, and the eastern end of a concurrency with Business Loop Interstate 94 (BL I-94). From this interchange westward, BL I-94/ Bus. US 23 follows Washtenaw Avenue along a five-lane street past commercial areas to County Farm Park and then continues as a four-lane roadway through residential neighborhoods. Washtenaw Avenue turns more northwesterly at the intersection with Stadium Boulevard southeast of Burns Park. Near the Central Campus of the University of Michigan, Washtenaw Avenue turns due north to cross part of campus before BL I-94/Bus. US 23 turns due west onto Huron Street near Palmer Field. Bus. US 23 follows BL I-94 and the four-lane Huron Street into downtown Ann Arbor to the intersection with Main Street. There, Bus. US 23 turns northward onto Main Street and exits downtown. Main Street has four lanes as it runs northward into a residential area. It parallels part of the Huron River before ending at an interchange with the M-14 freeway about a mile and a third (2.2 km) north of downtown. At that interchange, Bus. US 23 merges onto the freeway and runs concurrently with M-14, crossing the Huron River. There is one interchange for Barton Drive and Whitmore Lake Road on the northern bank of the river. The freeway runs through a wooded area and then after about one mile (1.6 km), it meets US 23 at an interchange in Ann Arbor Township that marks the northern terminus of the business loop.

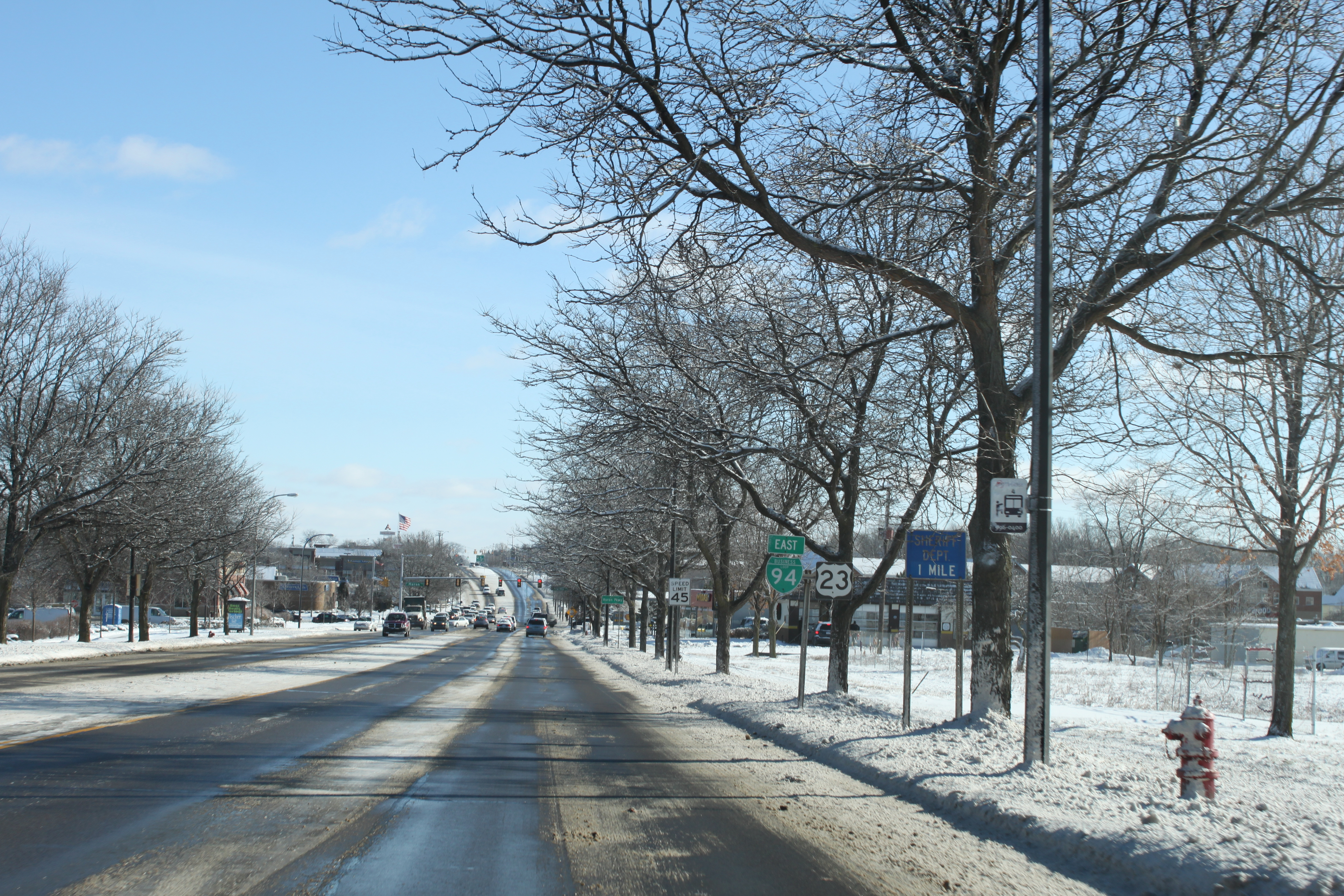
Washtenaw Avenue facing east

In 1962, the northern and eastern freeway bypass of Ann Arbor was completed. At that time, the former routing of US 23 through downtown and a section of freeway north of the Huron River was redesignated as Bus. US 23. Two years later, M-14 was rerouted to follow the US 23 freeway around the north side of Ann Arbor. It overlapped the business loop from the northern end of its freeway segment to Main Street and along Main Street into downtown. The next year, in 1965, this overlap was shortened when the rest of the M-14 freeway westward from Main Street to I-94 was completed.

Major intersections
The entire highway is in Washtenaw County.

Location	mi	km	Destinations	Notes
Pittsfield Township–Ann Arbor city line	0.000– 0.018	0.000– 0.029	BL I-94 east / US 23 – Flint, Toledo M-17 east (Washtenaw Avenue) – Ypsilanti	Eastern end of BL I-94 concurrency; exit 37 on US 23; western terminus of M-17
Ann Arbor	3.429	5.518	BL I-94 west	Western end of BL I-94 concurrency
Ann Arbor	4.795	7.717	M-14 west	Western end of M-14 concurrency; exit 3 on M-14
Ann Arbor	4.991	8.032	Barton Drive, Whitmore Lake Road	Exit 4 on Bus. US 23/M-14
Ann Arbor Township	5.741– 5.781	9.239– 9.304	US 23 / M-14 east – Flint, Toledo, Ohio, Detroit	Eastern end of M-14 concurrency; exit 45 on US 23
1.000 mi = 1.609 km; 1.000 km = 0.621 mi: Concurrency terminus

== Fenton ==
Business US Highway 23
- Location: Fenton
- Length: 3.009 mi (4.843 km)
- Existed: 1958–2006
- History: Southern 1.723 mi (2.773 km) unsigned after 1975

Business US Highway 23 (Bus. US 23) was a business route through downtown Fenton. At the time it was turned over to local control, it was signed as business spur from downtown to the US 23 freeway, but the state maintained a southern section that previously completed the route as a loop. At the southern end, this unsigned highway started at US 23 at the Owen Road interchange (exit 78) and continued eastward on Owen Road past Fenton High School and various businesses. At the intersection with Shiawassee Avenue, Bus. US 23 followed Shiawassee through a residential area toward the southern end of downtown. At the intersection with LeRoy Street, the unsigned business loop turned northward and across the Shiawassee River. At the intersection with River Street, state maintenance ended. On the northern end of downtown at the intersection of LeRoy Street and Silver Lake Road, it resumed. Bus. US 23 followed Silver Lake Road westward out of downtown through a residential area and northwesterly to an interchange with US 23 at exit 79.

The US 23 bypass of Fenton opened as a freeway west of downtown in 1958. The former route of US 23 along Shiawassee Avenue and LeRoy Street in Fenton was redesignated as a business loop at this time, and the state assumed control of Silver Lake Road to connect it back to the freeway northwest of town. Three years later, the US 23 freeway was extended southward from the Livingston–Genesee county line; at that time, the freeway connections were reconfigured and Bus. US 23 was shifted to use Owen Road between a new freeway interchange and the rest of the business loop at Shiawassee Avenue. In the middle of the 1970s, city officials redeveloped downtown and closed two blocks of LeRoy Street in 1975. After this closure, the business loop was split into two sections, and only the northern one was retained as a signed state highway. The southern segment was retained as an unsigned state highway until both segments were turned over to local control in 2006.

Major intersections
The entire highway was in Fenton, Genesee County.

mi	km	Destinations	Notes
0.000	0.000	US 23 – Flint, Ann Arbor	Southern terminus of southern unsigned segment; exit 78 on US 23
1.723	2.773	Leroy Street; River Street	Northern terminus of southern unsigned segment
Gap in route
0.000	0.000	Leroy Street; Silver Lake Road	Southern terminus of northern signed segment
1.286	2.070	US 23 – Flint, Ann Arbor	Northern terminus of northern signed segment; exit 79 on US 23
1.000 mi = 1.609 km; 1.000 km = 0.621 mi

== Saginaw ==
Business US Highway 23
- Location: Saginaw
- Length: 8.006 mi (12.884 km)
- Existed: 1953–1961

Business US Highway 23 (Bus. US 23) was a business loop that ran through downtown Saginaw. It started at an intersection between US 10 and US 23 in Bridgeport southeast of Saginaw. From there, it ran concurrently along US 10 (Dixie Highway) northwesterly into Saginaw. Once in downtown, the business loop turned northward on Washington Street, running parallel to the eastern banks of the Saginaw River through downtown. At the intersection between Washington Avenue, Washington Road and Veterans Memorial Parkway, Bus. US 23 terminated.

In 1953, the initial eastern bypass of Saginaw was built as a two-lane highway, and the former routing through downtown was redesignated Bus. US 23. This bypass was upgraded in 1961 to a full freeway as part of I-75/US 23, and the business loop through downtown was redesignated Business Loop I-75.

Major intersections
The entire highway was in Saginaw County.

Location	mi	km	Destinations	Notes
Bridgeport Township	0.000	0.000	US 10 east / US 23 – Bay City, Flint	Southern end of US 10 concurrency
Saginaw	4.407	7.092	M-46 west (Holland Avenue) – Muskegon, Port Sanilac	
Saginaw	6.005	9.664	US 10 west – Midland M-13 south (Washington Avenue)	Northern end of US 10 concurrency; northern terminus of M-13
Saginaw	8.006	12.884	US 23 (Veterans Memorial Parkway/Washington Road) / M-81 east (Washington Road) – Bay City, Flint, Caro	
1.000 mi = 1.609 km; 1.000 km = 0.621 mi: Concurrency terminus

== Bay City ==
Business US Highway 23
- Location: Bay City
- Length: 2.714 mi (4.368 km)
- Existed: 1941–1961

Business US Highway 23 (Bus. US 23) was a business loop through downtown Bay City. It started at the intersection of where US 23 turned off Broadway Street westward onto Lafayette Avenue. From this point, Bus. US 23 ran east on Lafayette Avenue for two blocks and then turned northward onto Garfield Avenue, running parallel to, but inland from, the Saginaw River into downtown Bay City. As it approached downtown, the business loop jogged off Garfield onto Washington Avenue. At the intersection with 7th Street, Bus. US 23 turned westward to cross the Saginaw River. On the opposite side, the business loop followed Jenny Street westbound and Thomas Street eastbound along a one-way pairing of streets. At the intersection with US 23 (Euclid Avenue), the business loop terminated.

With the construction of a new bridge across the Saginaw River in 1941 to connect Lafayette and Salzburg avenues, US 23 was rerouted to use that new bridge. The former routing of the mainline highway through downtown was redesignated Bus. US 23 at that time. Twenty years later, with the opening of the new freeway for Interstate 75 (I-75) near Bay City, US 23 was rerouted to follow I-75. The route of Bus. US 23 was redesignated as a part of Business Loop I-75 at this time.

Major intersections
The entire highway was in Bay City, Bay County.

mi	km	Destinations	Notes
0.000	0.000	US 23 – Standish, Saginaw	
1.234– 1.302	1.986– 2.095	M-15 south / M-25 east	Eastern end of M-15/M-25 concurrency
1.957	3.149	M-47 north	Northern terminus of M-47
2.714	4.368	US 23 / M-47 – Standish, Saginaw M-20 west – Midland M-15 south / M-25 east	Western end of M-15/M-25 concurrency; eastern terminus of M-20
1.000 mi = 1.609 km; 1.000 km = 0.621 mi: Concurrency terminus

== Rogers City ==
Business US Highway 23
- Location: Rogers City
- Length: 4.074 mi (6.556 km)
- Existed: 1942–present
- Tourist routes: Lake Huron Circle Tour

Business US Highway 23 (Bus. US 23) is a business loop that runs through downtown Rogers City on two-lane streets. The highway starts at an intersection with US 23 in Belknap Township south of downtown and passes the location of Michigan Limestone and Chemical Company's quarry on Petersville Road, the largest such quarry in the world. Farther north, the business loop passes the eastern end of the Rogers City Airport and turns northwesterly, parallel to, but inland from, the Lake Huron shoreline. Now following 3rd Street, Bus. US 23 runs through a residential area on the southern side of town before entering downtown. At the intersection with Erie Street, Bus. US 23 meets the eastern terminus of M-68. Four blocks later, the business loop comes the closest to Lake Huron in another residential area before turning to the west. Another five blocks to the west of this curve, Bus. US 23 terminates at an intersection with US 23 on the western edge of the city. The business route carries the section of the Lake Huron Circle Tour (LHCT) through Rogers City.

In 1940, a new highway routing for US 23 opened between Rogers City and Cheboygan. At the time, the former routing of US 23 through downtown Rogers City was renumbered as a part of M-65, which was also extended northward along the segment of M-91 that was not subsumed into the new US 23 routing. Just two years later, M-65 was pared back to end at US 23 southeast of Rogers City, and the section of M-65 through downtown was renumbered as Bus. US 23.

Major intersections
The entire highway is in Presque Isle County.

Location	mi	km	Destinations	Notes
Belknap Township	0.000	0.000	US 23 / LHCT – Cheboygan, Alpena	Southern end of LHCT concurrency
Rogers City	2.941	4.733	M-68 west – Onaway	Eastern terminus of M-68
Rogers City	4.074	6.556	US 23 / LHCT – Cheboygan, Alpena	Northern end of LHCT concurrency
1.000 mi = 1.609 km; 1.000 km = 0.621 mi: Concurrency terminus
