= M-13 Connector (Michigan highway) =

State highway in Michigan

Connector M-13
- Map of the Bay City area with Conn. M-13 highlighted in red

Route information
- Auxiliary route of M-13
- Maintained by MDOT
- Length: 2.414 mi (3.885 km)
- Existed: 1967–present

Major junctions
- South end: I-75 / US 23 near Bay City
- North end: M-13 near Kawkawlin

Location
- Country: United States
- State: Michigan
- Counties: Bay

Highway system
- Michigan State Trunkline Highway System; Interstate; US; State; Byways
← M-13	→ M-14

Connector M-13 (Conn. M-13) is a north–south state trunkline highway running 2.41 miles (3.88 km) connecting Interstate 75/US Highway 23 (I-75/US 23) to M-13 near the community of Kawkawlin, just north of Bay City. The Michigan Department of Transportation (MDOT) internally calls the road Connector 13. The freeway was once the northern end of the US 23 freeway in the area before I-75 was built to the northwest and US 23 was rerouted to follow it. When these changes were made in 1967, Conn. M-13 was designated for the freeway stub.

== Route description ==
Conn. M-13 starts at exit 164 along I-75/US 23 north of Bay City. At the interchange that marks its southern terminus, the connector route continues to the north while the main I-75 freeway turns northwesterly. About three-quarters of a mile (1.2 km) north, there is an interchange for Wilder Road. Traffic running southbound on the connector that wishes to continue northbound on I-75/US 23 has to use Wilder Road to connect to the latter freeway. The connector route is bordered by fields and residential subdivisions as it continues north to the community of Kawkawlin. The freeway ends at an at-grade intersection with M-13.

Conn. M-13 is maintained by MDOT like other state highways in Michigan. As a part of these maintenance responsibilities, the department tracks the volume of traffic that uses the roadways under its jurisdiction. These volumes are expressed using a metric called annual average daily traffic, which is a statistical calculation of the average daily number of vehicles on a segment of roadway. MDOT's surveys in 2010 showed that the traffic levels along Conn. M-13 were 13,939 vehicles daily south of the Wilder Road and 7,031 vehicles per day north of that interchange. The only section of the freeway that has been listed on the National Highway System (NHS) is from the southern terminus to the Wilder Road interchange.

== History ==
This short freeway was opened in late 1960 or early 1961 as the north end of a new US 23 freeway around Bay City. The freeway was extended farther north to the Standish area in 1967; M-13 was extended north to replace the US 23 designation along the latter's former routing through Pinconning. At that time, the freeway stub north of Bay City became Conn. M-13.

== Exit list ==
The entire highway is in Monitor Township, Bay County. All exits are unnumbered.

mi	km	Destinations	Notes
0.000	0.000	I-75 / US 23 – Saginaw	Exit 164 on I-75/US 23; northbound entrance to Conn. M-13 and southbound exit to I-75/US 23
0.702	1.130	Wilder Road	Provides southbound Conn. M-13 access to northbound I-75/US 23 via Wilder Road
2.414	3.885	M-13 / LHCT	At-grade intersection; freeway ends
1.000 mi = 1.609 km; 1.000 km = 0.621 mi: Incomplete access
