= Au Gres River =

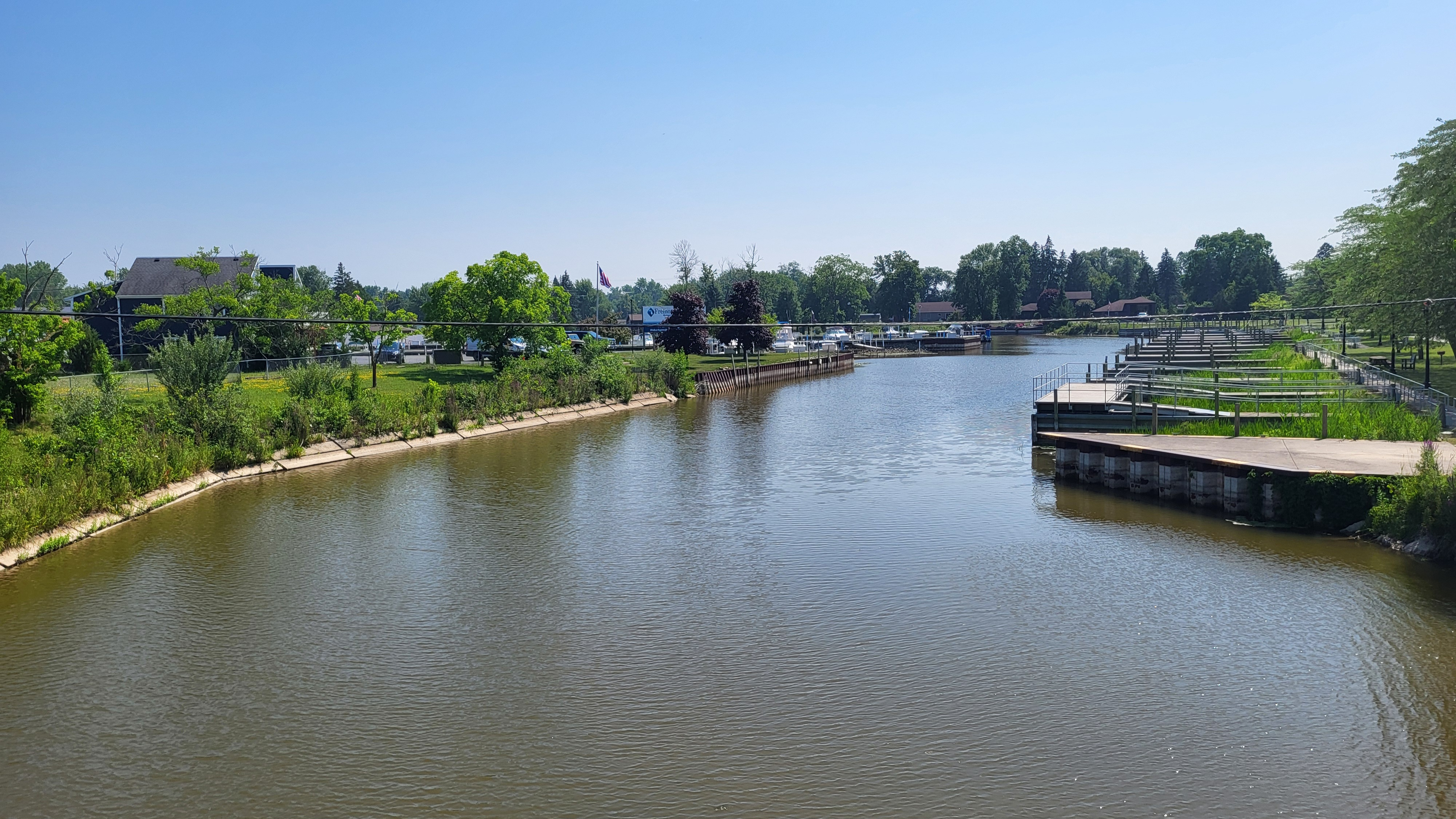
- View from the US 23 bridge in Au Gres

Location
- Country: United States

Physical characteristics
- Source
  - location: Hill Township, Ogemaw County, Michigan
  - coordinates: 44.35418°N 83.96277°W
- Mouth
  - location: Saginaw Bay, Lake Huron, Michigan
  - coordinates: 44.02835°N 83.68192°W
- Length: 47 mi (76 km)
- Basin size: 450 mi^{2} (1,200 km^{2})

The Au Gres River is a river in Michigan. Its mouth is at Lake Huron in the city of Au Gres, Michigan. It flows through Arenac, Iosco and Ogemaw counties. It formerly had an eastern branch, which was severed from the parent river and rerouted along the Whitney Drain to Lake Huron north of Au Gres. The main stream is 46.7 miles (75.2 km) long.

== See also ==
- List of rivers of Michigan
