= M-14 (Michigan highway) =

State highway in Washtenaw and Wayne counties in Michigan, United States

M-14
- M-14 highlighted in red

Route information
- Maintained by MDOT
- Length: 22.250 mi (35.808 km)
- Existed: 1956–present

Major junctions
- West end: I-94 near Ann Arbor
- US 23 near Ann Arbor; M-153 near Dixboro
- East end: I-96 / I-275 near Livonia

Location
- Country: United States
- State: Michigan
- Counties: Washtenaw, Wayne

Highway system
- Michigan State Trunkline Highway System; Interstate; US; State; Byways
← Conn. M-13	→ M-15

M-14 is an east–west state trunkline highway in the southeastern portion of the US state of Michigan. Entirely freeway, it runs for 22.250 miles (35.808 km) to connect Ann Arbor with Detroit by way of a connection with Interstate 96 (I-96). The western terminus is at a partial interchange with I-94 west of Ann Arbor. From there, the freeway curves around the north side of Ann Arbor and runs concurrently with US Highway 23 (US 23). East of that section, M-14 passes through woodlands and fields in Washtenaw County. In Wayne County, the freeway returns to a suburban area of mixed residential neighborhoods and light industrial areas. It crosses two different rivers and a pair of rail lines as it approaches Detroit's inner suburbs, where it terminates at an interchange between I-96 and I-275.

When the state's highway system was first signed in 1919, there was a different M-14 that ran the length of the Lower Peninsula of Michigan. This was later replaced by a pair of different US Highways in the 1920s and 1930s. Another M-14 was designated that lasted until the 1940s. The current highway dates back to 1956 when it was designated along a series of roads that previously carried US 12. During the 1960s and 1970s, M-14 was moved to the freeway alignment it currently uses; sections of the former route are still maintained by the Michigan Department of Transportation (MDOT) as unsigned highways.

== Route description ==
The western terminus of M-14 is west of Ann Arbor, at exit 171 on I-94. This is a partial interchange; only traffic from eastbound I-94 can access eastbound M-14, and traffic from westbound M-14 must follow westbound I-94. From this junction, M-14 runs northeasterly through suburban Scio Township. The freeway is bordered by residential subdivisions to the southeast and woodlands to the northwest. M-14 curves around to the east through an interchange that has ramps that connect Miller and Maple roads; the ramps connect to Maple Road through a pair of roundabouts. As it approaches the Huron River, the freeway has an interchange with Business US 23 (Bus. US 23); the two highways merge and run concurrently to the north over the river. Bus. US 23/M-14 then has an unusual right-in/right-out interchange that uses short connector roads to provide access to Barton Drive on the north side of the river. The freeway then continues north to an interchange with US 23. The business loop ends there, and M-14 turns eastward to follow the US 23 freeway around the north side of Ann Arbor.

The US 23/M-14 freeway runs for about one mile (1.6 km) before US 23 turns southward to run between Ann Arbor and Ypsilanti while M-14 continues east through Ann Arbor Township past Domino's Farms, the office complex for Domino's Pizza that was to be the home to Tom Monaghan's Leaning Tower of Pizza. East of that complex, M-14 runs through woodlands and fields north of the community of Dixboro. The freeway turns northeasterly after the interchange with M-153. At the Napier Road underpass, M-14 crosses into Wayne County.

Once across the county line, the M-14 freeway runs through residential subdivisions from the western Detroit suburbs. There is an interchange for Beck Road and M-14 expands to six lanes, turning back to the east. The freeway crosses a rail line operated by CSX Transportation, and passes the Ford Motor Company's Sheldon Road Plant near the Sheldon Road interchange. There is a crossing for another CSX rail line near the bridges over the River Rouge by the St. Johns Golf Course. The freeway through this area curves around a bit north of its previous course. As M-14 nears the Livonia city line, it meets an interchange with I-96 and I-275 that marks the eastern terminus of M-14 in Plymouth Township.

M-14 is maintained by MDOT like other state highways in Michigan. As a part of these maintenance responsibilities, the department tracks the volume of traffic that uses the roadways under its jurisdiction. These volumes are expressed using a metric called annual average daily traffic, which is a statistical calculation of the average daily number of vehicles on a segment of roadway. MDOT's surveys in 2010 showed that the highest traffic levels along M-14 were the 86,500 vehicles daily east of the Sheldon Road interchange in Plymouth Township; the lowest counts were the 26,641 vehicles per day west of the Miller Road interchange. All of M-14 has been listed on the National Highway System, a network of roads important to the country's economy, defense, and mobility.

== History ==
=== Previous designations ===
In July 1919, M-14 was signed on a north–south route that ran most of the length of the Lower Peninsula, beginning at the Ohio state line south of Hudson to end three miles (4.8 km) south of downtown Cheboygan. It mostly followed the path of present-day US 127, I-75 and M-27. This edition of M-14 was truncated in November 1926 when the US Highway System was formed. From the Jackson area north to Lansing, it was US 127; from Lansing to Cheboygan, it was US 27. In 1930, US 127 was rerouted to replace the remainder of M-14 when US 223 was created. Right afterwards, M-14 was designated from Battle Creek to Edmore. This designation of M-14 was eliminated when M-66 was rerouted to replace it in the mid-1940s.

=== Current designation ===
In 1956, the portion of US 12 from the west side of Ann Arbor into Detroit was rerouted from surface streets to new stretches of freeways running south of Ann Arbor and Ypsilanti. The former route of US 12, much of which was known as Plymouth Road, was retained as a trunkline and redesignated M-14. In 1964, a northern bypass connecting US 23 with M-153 was completed, and M-14 was rerouted onto the new freeway; the highway still ran through Ann Arbor along routes now designated Bus. US 23 and Business Loop I-94. The following year, the freeway was extended to its present western terminus at I-94, and M-14 is removed from the business routes and transferred to the expressway.

In 1977, when the Jeffries Freeway (I-96) was completed, M-14 was shortened to have its eastern terminus at I-275 exit 28 in Plymouth Township, and the portion of Plymouth Road within the city of Detroit was returned to local control. The portion of Plymouth Road–Ann Arbor Road between I-275 and the city boundary with Redford Township was retained as an unsigned trunkline, maintained by the state to this day. In 1979, the final segment of the M-14 freeway, between M-153 and I-275 was completed. The former route of M-14 in Washtenaw County along Plymouth–Ann Arbor Road was returned to local control. The portion of Ann Arbor Road from the Wayne County line east to I-275 also became an unsigned state trunkline, also still maintained by MDOT.

== Exit list ==
County	Location	mi	km	Exit	Destinations	Notes
Washtenaw	Scio Township	0.000	0.000	—	I-94 west – Jackson, Chicago	No connection to eastbound or from westbound I-94; exit 171 on I-94
Washtenaw	Ann Arbor	1.438– 1.788	2.314– 2.878	2	Miller Road, Maple Road	
Washtenaw	Ann Arbor	3.573– 3.658	5.750– 5.887	3	Bus. US 23 south – Downtown Ann Arbor	Western end of Bus. US 23 concurrency; westbound exit and eastbound entrance
Washtenaw	Ann Arbor	3.854	6.202	4	Barton Drive, Whitmore Lake Road	Signed only as Barton Drive northbound; no trucks permitted on northbound exit and entrance ramps
Washtenaw	Ann Arbor Township	4.604– 4.644	7.409– 7.474	—	US 23 north / Bus. US 23 south – Brighton, Flint	Eastern end of Bus. US 23 concurrency; western end of US 23 concurrency; no exit number eastbound; exit 45 on US 23
Washtenaw	Ann Arbor Township	6.686	10.760	8	US 23 south – Ann Arbor	Eastern end of US 23 concurrency; no exit number eastbound; exit 42 on US 23
Washtenaw	Superior Township	10.024	16.132	10	M-153 east (Ford Road)	Western terminus of M-153
Washtenaw	Salem Township	14.233	22.906	15	Gotfredson Road	
Wayne	Plymouth Township	17.660	28.421	18	Beck Road	
Wayne	Plymouth Township	19.150	30.819	20	Sheldon Road	
Wayne	Plymouth Township	21.659– 22.250	34.857– 35.808	—	I-96 (Jeffries Freeway) / I-275 – Detroit, Flint, Lansing, Toledo	Exit 173 on I-96; exit 29 on I-275
1.000 mi = 1.609 km; 1.000 km = 0.621 mi: Concurrency terminus; Incomplete access
