= Au Gres Township, Michigan =

- Civil township
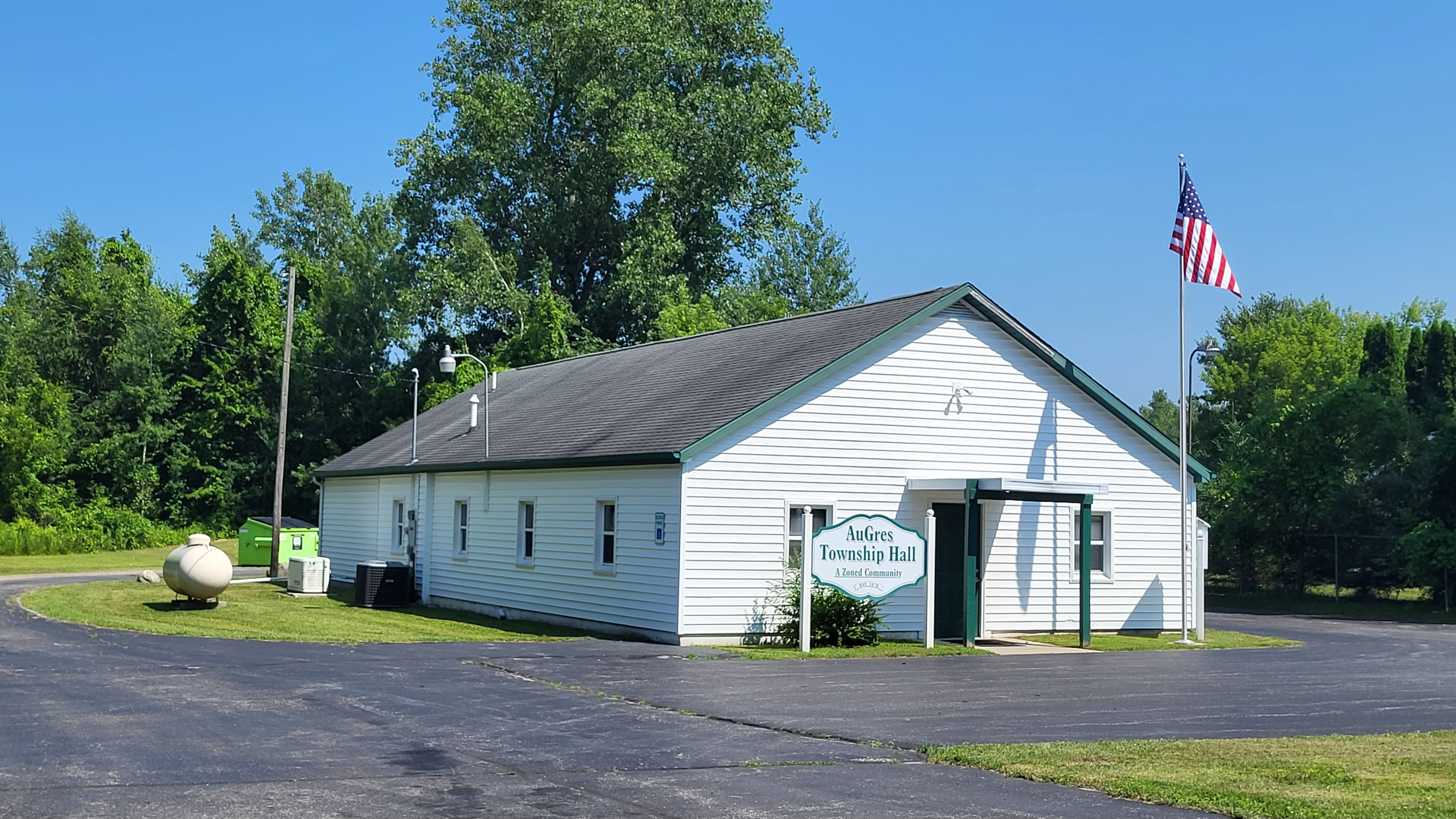
- Au Gres Township Hall

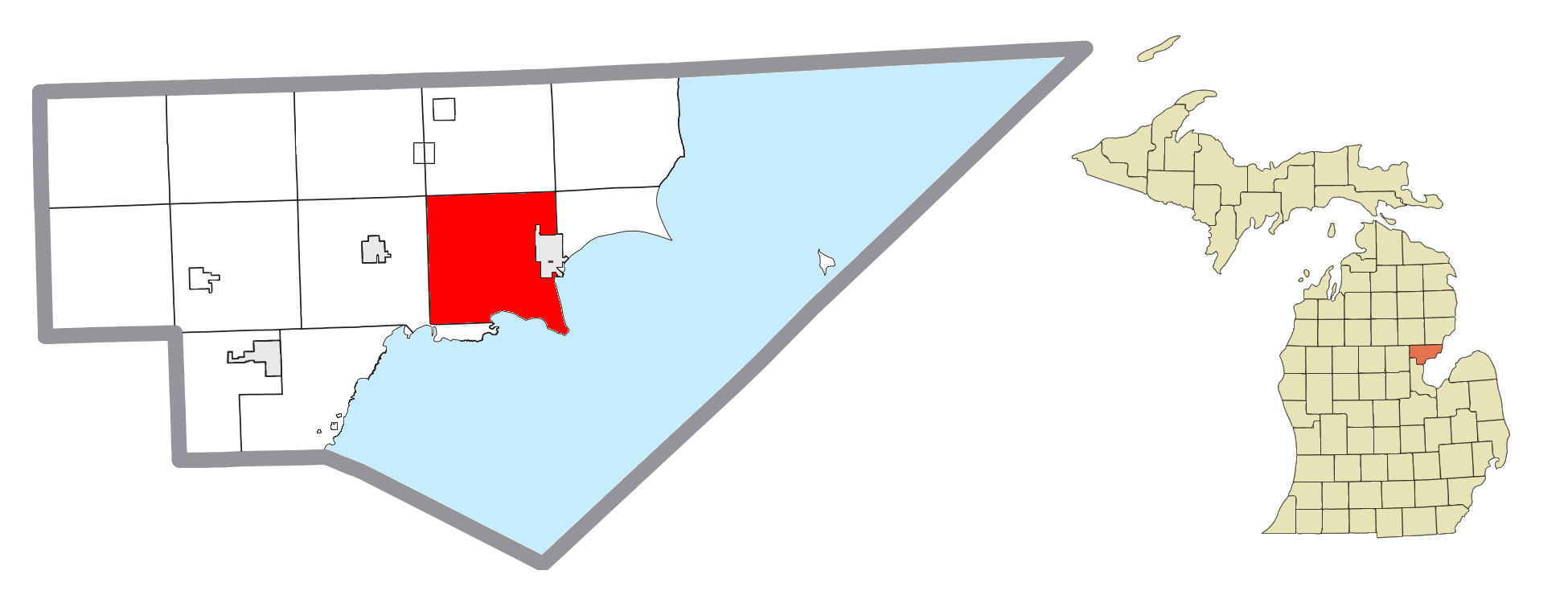
- Location within Arenac County

- Location within the state of Michigan Au Gres Township (the United States)
- Coordinates: 44°02′29″N 83°43′16″W
- Country: United States
- State: Michigan
- County: Arenac

Government
  - Supervisor: Jim Herzog

Area
  - Total: 38.8 sq mi (100.4 km^{2})
  - Land: 33.4 sq mi (86.4 km^{2})
  - Water: 5.4 sq mi (14.0 km^{2})
- Elevation: 590 ft (180 m)

Population (2020)
  - Total: 896
  - Density: 26.9/sq mi (10.4/km^{2})
- Time zone: UTC-5 (Eastern (EST))
  - Summer (DST): UTC-4 (EDT)
- ZIP code: 48658, 48703, 48749, 48765, 48766
- Area code: 989
- FIPS code: 26-04140
- GNIS feature ID: 1625862
- Website: https://www.augrestownship.com/

Au Gres Township (/ˈɔːɡreɪ/ AW-gray) is a civil township of Arenac County in the U.S. state of Michigan. As of the 2020 census, the township population was 896. The city of Au Gres borders the township to the east but both are administered autonomously.

== Geography ==
According to the United States Census Bureau, the township has a total area of 38.8 square miles (100.4 km^{2}), of which 33.4 square miles (86.4 km^{2}) is land and 5.4 square miles (14.0 km^{2}), or 13.95%, is water.

== Demographics ==
As of the census of 2000, there were 1,007 people, 434 households, and 311 families residing in the township. The population density was 29.7 inhabitants per square mile (11.5/km^{2}). There were 636 housing units at an average density of 18.8 per square mile (7.3/km^{2}). The racial makeup of the township was 97.52% White, 0.10% African American, 0.89% Native American, 0.30% Asian, 0.10% Pacific Islander, and 1.09% from two or more races. Hispanic or Latino of any race were 0.10% of the population.

There were 434 households, out of which 24.4% had children under the age of 18 living with them, 63.1% were married couples living together, 4.8% had a female householder with no husband present, and 28.3% were non-families. 24.0% of all households were made up of individuals, and 11.3% had someone living alone who was 65 years of age or older. The average household size was 2.32 and the average family size was 2.70.

In the township the population was spread out, with 20.6% under the age of 18, 5.6% from 18 to 24, 22.1% from 25 to 44, 33.3% from 45 to 64, and 18.5% who were 65 years of age or older. The median age was 46 years. For every 100 females, there were 110.7 males. For every 100 females age 18 and over, there were 105.1 males.

The median income for a household in the township was $34,141, and the median income for a family was $39,167. Males had a median income of $34,231 versus $21,136 for females. The per capita income for the township was $18,049. About 7.4% of families and 9.4% of the population were below the poverty line, including 20.3% of those under age 18 and 3.7% of those age 65 or over.
