= M-17 (Michigan highway) =

State highway in Washtenaw County, Michigan, United States

M-17
- Ypsilanti with M-17 highlighted in red

Route information
- Maintained by MDOT
- Length: 6.390 mi (10.284 km)
- Existed: c. July 1, 1919–present

Major junctions
- West end: US 23 / BL I-94 / Bus. US 23 at Ann Arbor
- East end: US 12 near Ypsilanti

Location
- Country: United States
- State: Michigan
- Counties: Washtenaw

Highway system
- Michigan State Trunkline Highway System; Interstate; US; State; Byways
← US 16	→ M-18

M-17 is a 6.390-mile-long (10.284 km) state trunkline highway in the U.S. state of Michigan, connecting the cities of Ypsilanti and Ann Arbor in Washtenaw County. It was once part of a highway that spanned the southern Lower Peninsula of Michigan before the creation of the U.S. Highway System in 1926. The designation once extended into downtown Detroit, but the eastern terminus was progressively scaled back in the late 1960s to the current location in Ypsilanti. The changes made to the highways in Washtenaw County spawned Business M-17 (Bus. M-17), a business loop for 11 years between 1945 and 1956.

== Route description ==
M-17 begins at exit 37 along US Highway 23 (US 23) on the Ann Arbor – Pittsfield Township border. West of this cloverleaf interchange, Washtenaw Avenue is Business Loop Interstate 94 (BL I-94) and Business US 23 (Bus. US 23). M-17 follows Washtenaw Avenue east of this interchange through Pittsfield Township and Ypsilanti Township. The street is five lanes wide through an urban area between Ann Arbor and Ypsilanti running east-southeasterly. Although there are many residential areas near M-17, particularly to the south, the road itself is dominated by commercial development, including numerous restaurants. M-17 crosses into the city of Ypsilanti at Hewitt Road. This intersection provides access north to Rynearson Stadium, home field for the Eastern Michigan University (EMU) Eagles football team.

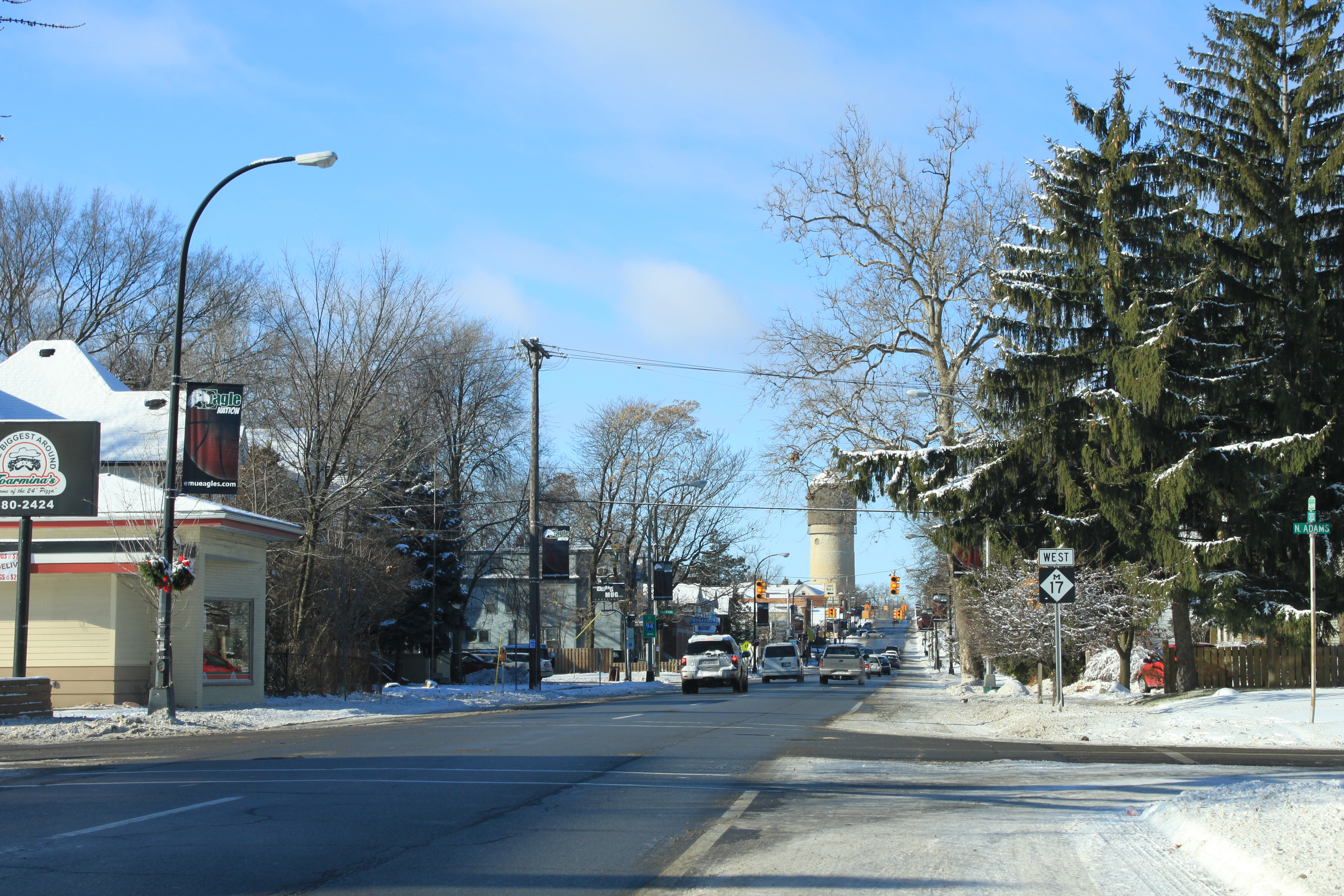
Cross Street, one-way, facing west

Continuing east-southeasterly along Washtenaw Avenue, M-17 meets the southwest corner of the EMU campus at Oakwood Avenue. The highway follows the southern edge of campus to Cross Street, where the highway splits to follow a one-way pairing of streets. Eastbound M-17 continues along Washtenaw Avenue while westbound traffic follows Cross Street. Eastbound traffic turns southward at Hamilton Street for two blocks before turning east along Michigan Avenue, meeting westbound Bus. US 12. The two highway designations merge, running concurrently through downtown Ypsilanti. The section of Michigan Avenue between Hamilton and Huron streets is actually a wrong-way concurrency because although it is a two-way boulevard, the eastbound direction is M-17 and the westbound direction is Bus. US 12. Both directions of traffic for both highways rejoin at Huron Street, as the westbound M-17 traffic uses Huron Street north to Cross Street and westbound Bus. US 12 turns south along Huron Street. Northeast of the Huron Street intersection is Riverside Park. Michigan Avenue forms the extreme southern park boundary just before it crosses the Huron River. At Ecorse Road, M-17 turns south in Ypsilanti Township through a residential area, separating from Bus. US 12. Ecorse Road turns east four blocks north of I-94/US 12 and runs parallel to the freeway. Past Harris Road, US 12 turns northeasterly on a separate expressway. Where it meets Ecorse Road, US 12 follows Ecorse Road, replacing M-17. This junction marks the eastern terminus of M-17 west of Willow Run Airport.

Like other state highways in Michigan, M-17 is maintained by the Michigan Department of Transportation (MDOT). As a part of these maintenance duties, the department tracks the traffic levels along its roadways using a metric called annual average daily traffic (AADT). This is a statistical calculation of the average daily number of vehicles on a segment of roadway. In 2009, MDOT's surveys found that the highest AADT along the trunkline was 26,141 vehicles daily on the westernmost section near the US 23 interchange while the lowest counts were along the north–south section of Ecorse Road at 8,926 vehicles. The section of M-17 from US 23 to the western junctions with Bus. US 12 has been listed on the National Highway System, a network of roadways important to the country's economy, defense, and mobility.

== History ==
M-17 is an original state trunkline dating back to the 1919 signing of the system. On July 1, 1919, the highway started at M-11 in Berrien County in the southwestern Lower Peninsula and ran east to Detroit. The debut of the U.S. Highway System replaced most of M-17 with two different highways. From Watervliet to Ann Arbor, US 12 replaced M-17; east of Ypsilanti to Detroit, US 112 replaced M-17. The M-17 designation also replaced M-23 on Ecorse Road between Ypsilanti and Lincoln Park and then ran concurrently with US 25 into Detroit. The Ann Arbor segment was rerouted along Boulevard Drive (now Stadium Boulevard) between US 12 and US 23.

A realignment in 1937–38 moved the M-17 designation in Allen Park. Changes made moved the highway to turn east on Southfield Road to US 25 and follow US 25 back to the former routing into Detroit. Another larger change came before 1945 with the completion of the Willow Run Expressway. M-17 was rerouted west of the Wayne–Washtenaw county line along the expressway that replaced Ecorse Road. M-17 was joined by Bypass US 112 (BYP US 112) along the Willow Run Expressway to a southern freeway bypass of Ypsilanti. M-17 continued past the end of BYP US 112 at US 112/Michigan Avenue along a two-lane highway to US 23. It then followed US 23 back to Washtenaw Avenue in Pittsfield Township to rejoin the original alignment of M-17 west to Ann Arbor. The former M-17 through downtown Ypsilanti was redesignated Business M-17 (Bus. M-17).

The Michigan State Highway Department (MSHD) completed the freeway bypass of the Ann Arbor–Ypsilanti in 1956, then moved the M-17 designation back to Washtenaw Avenue, Michigan Avenue and Ecorse Road, removing Bus. M-17 in the process. US 12 and US 112 replaced the BYP US 112 designation on the freeway. The former US 112 designation through downtown Ypsilanti was converted to a BUS US 112 designation, including sections concurrent with M-17. Another change was made to the Ann-Arbor section of the highway as it was truncated to end at US 23. The 1962 completion of the US 23 freeway through the Ann Arbor area by MSHD moved the western terminus of M-17 west to meet the new freeway at the current terminus. The eastern terminus was progressively scaled back starting in 1968. The US 25 concurrency was removed and the terminus was moved to M-39/Southfield Road in Allen Park. A second truncation scaled the terminus back to US 12, the current eastern endpoint.

== Major intersections ==
The entire highway is in Washtenaw County.

Location	mi	km	Destinations	Notes
Ann Arbor – Pittsfield Township	0.000	0.000	US 23 – Flint, Toledo BL I-94 west / Bus. US 23 north – Ann Arbor	Washtenaw Avenue continues west as Bus. US 23; exit 37 on US 23
Ypsilanti	4.005	6.445	Bus. US 12 west	Western end of Bus. US 12 concurrency
Ypsilanti	4.558	7.335	Bus. US 12 east	Eastern end of Bus. US 12 concurrency
Ypsilanti Township	6.390	10.284	US 12 – Detroit, Coldwater	Former eastbound exit to eastbound US 12 and westbound entrance from westbound US 12 only; reconstructed in 2022 as at-grade intersection with Michigan left for opposing directions
1.000 mi = 1.609 km; 1.000 km = 0.621 mi: Concurrency terminus

== Business loop ==
Business M-17
- Location: Ypsilanti
- Existed: 1945–1956

Business M-17 (Bus. M-17) was a business route designation used along a section of highway from 1945 until 1956. It was routed along Washtenaw and Michigan avenues and Ecorse Road in the Ypsilanti area. At the time of its commissioning, M-17 was moved to a freeway bypass of downtown Ypsilanti. It was later decommissioned in 1956 when the freeway bypass was completed west around the south side of Ann Arbor. M-17 was moved back to its original routing through downtown Ypsilanti, supplanting Bus. M-17 when US 12/US 112 supplanted M-17 on the freeway.
