= M-13 (Michigan highway) =

State highway in Michigan, United States

M-13
- } M-13 highlighted in red

Route information
- Maintained by MDOT
- Length: 73.339 mi (118.028 km)
- Existed: c. 1932–present
- Tourist routes: Lake Huron Circle Tour

Major junctions
- South end: I-69 near Lennon
- M-57 near Montrose; I-75 / US 23 near Saginaw; BS I-75 / M-25 in Bay City
- North end: US 23 near Standish

Location
- Country: United States
- State: Michigan
- Counties: Shiawassee, Genesee, Saginaw, Bay, Arenac

Highway system
- Michigan State Trunkline Highway System; Interstate; US; State; Byways
← M-12	→ Conn. M-13

M-13 is a 73.339-mile (118.028 km) north–south state trunkline highway that runs through the Saginaw Bay region of the US state of Michigan. It runs from Interstate 69 (I-69) south of Lennon to US Highway 23 (US 23) near Standish. The southern section of the trunkline runs along a pair of county lines in a rural area dominated by farm fields. The highway directly connects the downtown areas of both Saginaw and Bay City. North of the latter city, the Lake Huron Circle Tour follows M-13 along the Saginaw Bay.

The original 1919 version of M-13 ran along the west side of the state, roughly replaced by what is now US 131 in 1926. The current highway was first designated by 1932 with the M-13 moniker. After a series of extensions in the 1930s, the highway ran from Lennon to Saginaw. Another set of expansions in the 1960s added roadways that previously carried US 23 all the way north to the Standish area. A related section of highway is numbered Connector M-13, a connector route that was once part of US 23 in the Kawkawlin area.

== Route description ==
M-13 starts at its junction with I-69 near the village of Lennon along the Genesee–Shiawassee county line. The highway follows County Line Road north into the village where it follows Sheridan Avenue through town, including a crossing of the Huron and Eastern Railway North of Lennon, the trunkline intersects M-21 and continues along the county line through fields. Northeast of New Lothrop, M-13 moves from the Genesee–Shiawassee county line to the Genesee–Saginaw county line. Near Montrose, the highway intersects M-57 before passing into woodlands while crossing fully into Saginaw County.

M-13 angles to the northwest briefly before returning to a due north course along East Road. The highway crosses the Flint River in another area of farm fields. As the road approaches Saginaw, it crosses the Cass River and runs to the east of it as it merges with the Shiawassee River and the Tittabawassee River to form the Saginaw River. M-13 follows Washington Avenue in the city of Saginaw inland from, but parallel to, the Saginaw River through downtown. The trunkline intersects M-46, which follows Rust Avenue, and passes Hoyt Park. Washington Avenue runs by the campus of St. Mary's of Michigan Medical Center. As the highway passes out of downtown, it crosses or runs alongside lines of the Saginaw Bay Southern and Lake State railways.

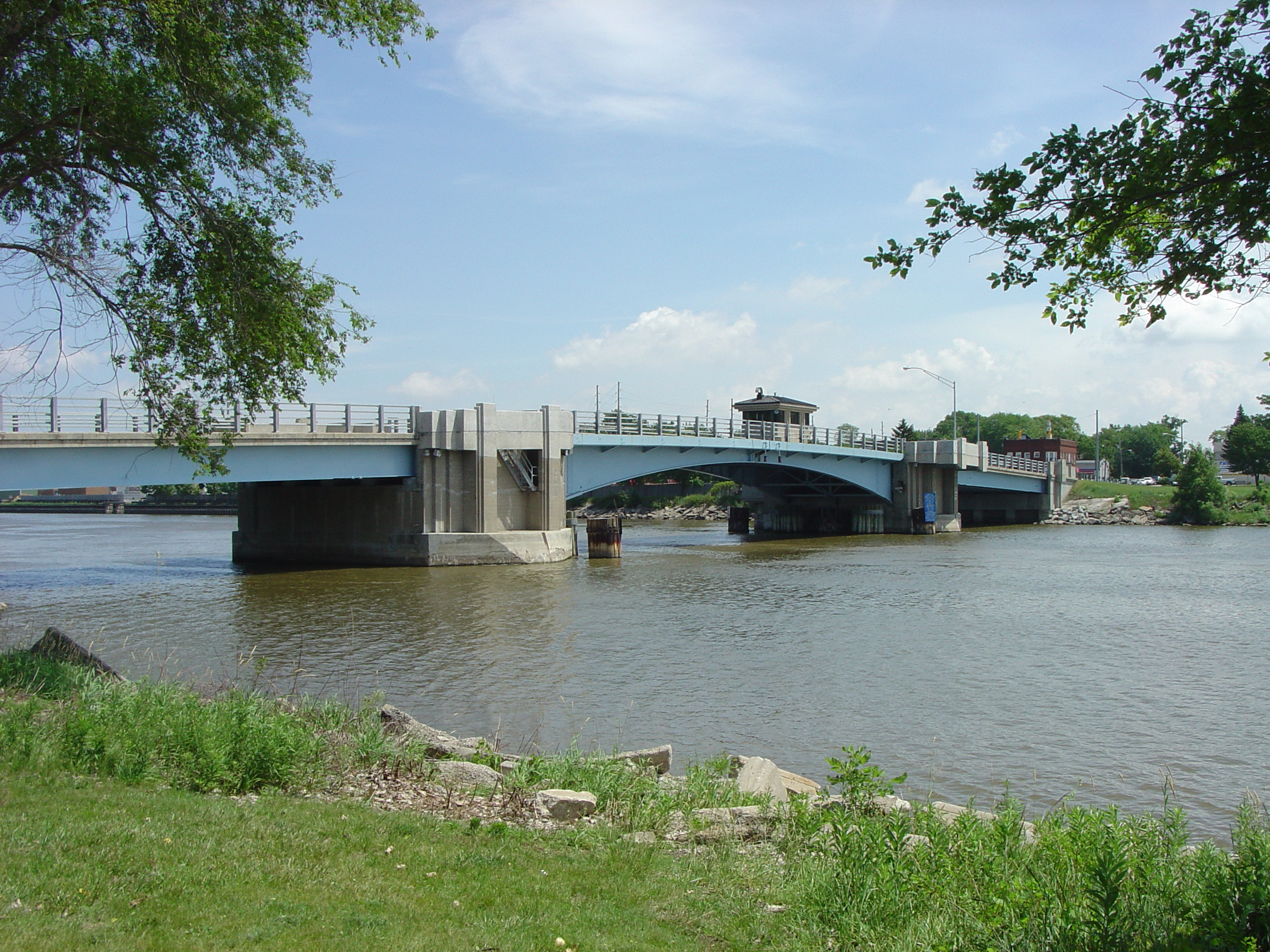
The Lafayette Avenue Bridge carries M-13/M-84 across the Saginaw River in Bay City

Running immediately next to the river, M-13 meets I-75/US 23 at that freeway's exit 153 just southeast of the Zilwaukee Bridge. The highway runs along Bay City Road as it continues to follow the Saginaw River through the Crow Island State Game Area. On the south side of Bay City, the name changes to River Road. M-13 passes the James Clements Municipal Airport and transitions to follow Broadway Street into downtown. At Lafayette Street, M-13 turns west and merges with M-84. The two highways run concurrently across the Saginaw River on the Lafayette Avenue Bridge. The structure's two spans connect the riverbanks with the Middle Ground Island in the center. West of the bridge, M-13/M-84 follows Salzburg Avenue to the intersection with Euclid Avenue. At that location, M-13 turns north along Euclid Avenue, which runs along the western city line. M-13 meets the 2 one-way streets that carry M-25 and the I-75 business spur at the intersections with Thomas and Jenny streets. From this intersection on, M-13 forms a part of the Lake Huron Circle Tour. Farther north, the highway turns northwesterly on Huron Road; Euclid Avenue continues north as M-247.

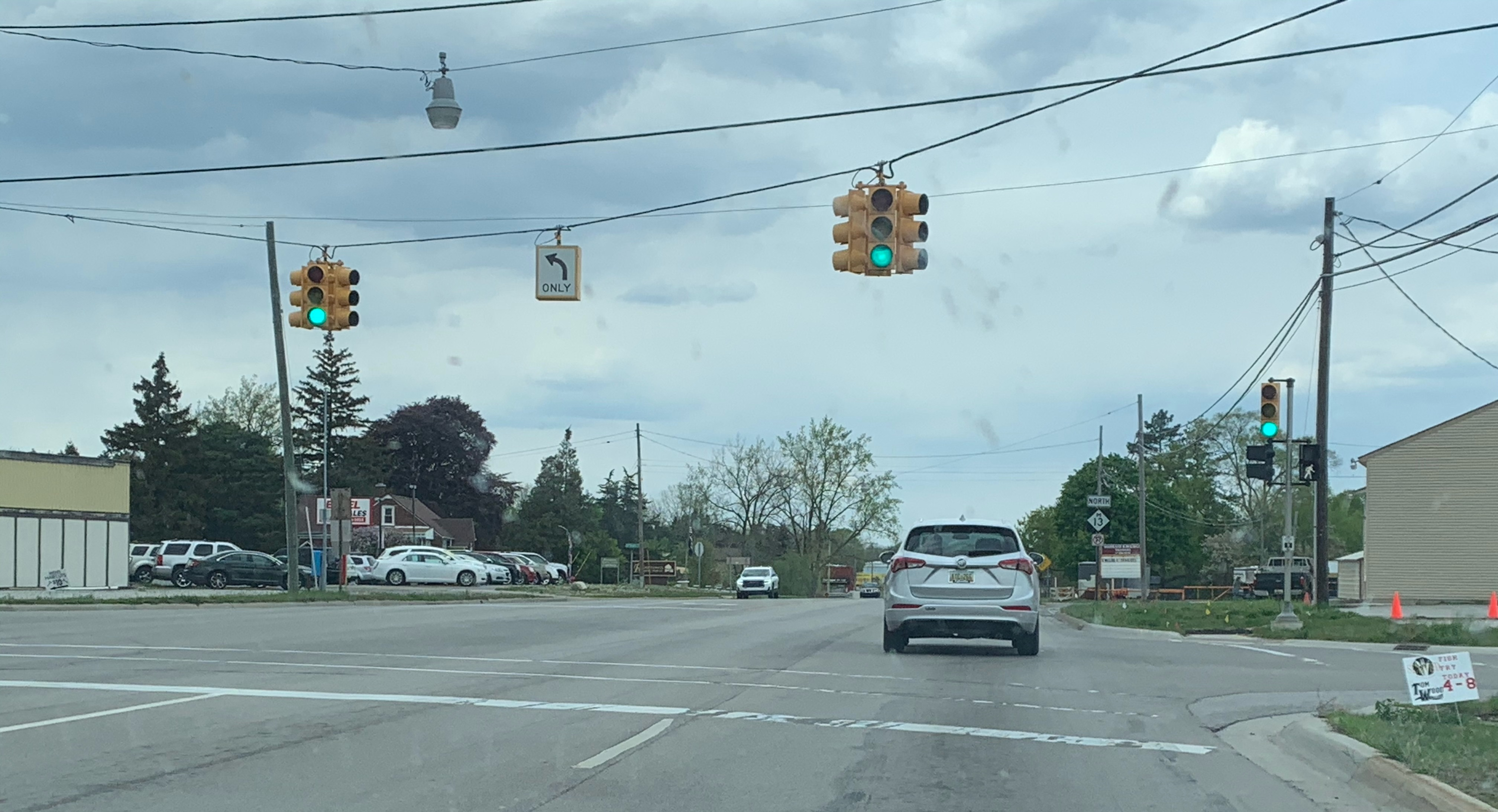
M-13 looking north in Kawkawlin

As the trunkline heads away from Bay City, it runs parallel to the Lake State Railway again. M-13 intersects the northern end of its connector route before Huron Road crosses the Kawkawlin River. The highway runs through the community of the same name on the north side of the river. M-13 and Huron Road continue north across mixed agricultural and forest land as they pass through the communities of Linwood and Pinconning. South of Standish in Arenac County, M-13 meets the northern end of the US 23 freeway and terminates.

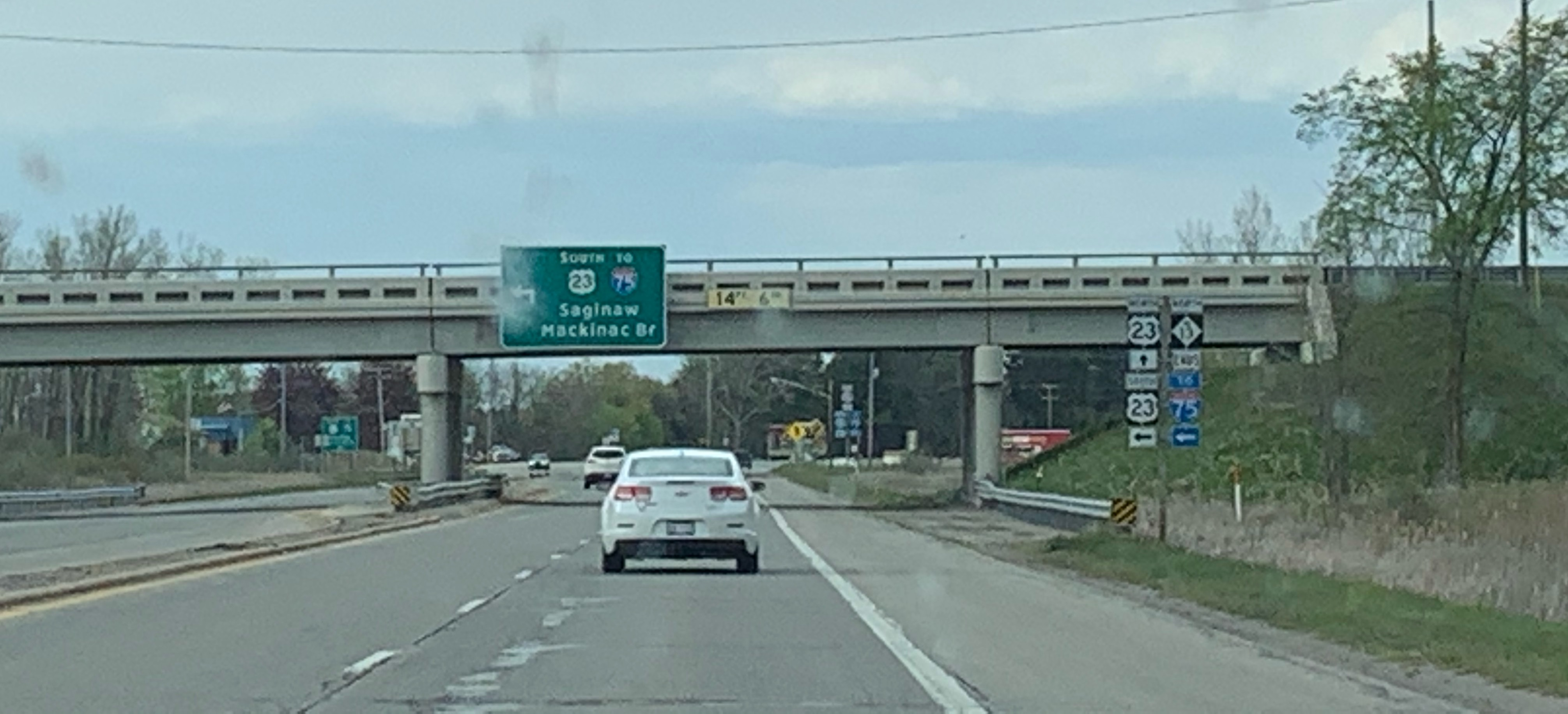
The northern terminus of M-13 in Standish Township

M-13 is maintained by the Michigan Department of Transportation (MDOT) like other state highways in Michigan. As a part of these maintenance responsibilities, the department tracks the volume of traffic that uses the roadways under its jurisdiction. These volumes are expressed using a metric called annual average daily traffic, which is a statistical calculation of the average daily number of vehicles on a segment of roadway. MDOT's surveys in 2009 showed that the highest traffic levels along M-13 were the 28,242 vehicles daily north of the M-25 junction in Bay City; the lowest counts were the 3381 vehicles per day south of the I-75/US 23 interchange near Saginaw. The only sections of M-13 that have been listed on the National Highway System (NHS) are along the M-84 concurrency and Euclid Avenue south of Wilder Road in the Bay City area.

== History ==
=== Previous designations ===
When the state highway system was first signed in 1919, M-13 followed the general path of the modern US 131. The highway specifically ran along what is now M-103, US 12, the pre-freeway US 131, M-113, M-186, US 131, US 31 and M-119 between the Indiana state line south of Mottville to Harbor Springs. When the United States Numbered Highway System was created on November 11, 1926, US 131 replaced M-13 from the state line north to Fife Lake; from Fife Lake north to Harbor Springs, the highway was redesignated M-131.

In 1927, the section of M-19 from Brockway to Avoca was redesignated as M-13 and extended through Avoca. During 1929, the trunkline was extended eastward to terminate at the contemporary M-51 near Gardendale. In 1931 M-13 was redesignated as M-136.

=== Current highway ===
The Michigan State Highway Department (MSHD) used the M-13 designation for a highway at the end of 1932 that connected M-78 and M-21 through Lennon. By the middle of 1936, the highway had been extended northward to end at a junction with M-46 in Saginaw. The entire trunkline was paved in the middle of 1939. Later the next year, the section in Saginaw was extended a bit farther along Washington Avenue to end at a junction with US 10 and US 23. A section of the then-M-78 freeway (now I-69) opened between 1958 and 1960; when this freeway opened, M-13 was truncated northwards slightly in the Lennon area to end at the new highway. The first section of the US 23 freeway around Bay City opened in late 1960 or early 1961. When it opened, MSHD extended M-13 along the former route of US 23 from the northside of Saginaw into Bay City to the end of the freeway at Kawkawlin. The I-75/US 23 freeway north of the Kawkawlin area to Standish opened in 1967, and M-13 is shown on maps following US 23's former route through Linwood and Pinconning after the change. The routing of M-13 has stayed the same since.

== Major intersections ==
County	Location	mi	km	Destinations	Notes
Shiawasee–Genesee county line	Venice–Clayton township line	0.000	0.000	I-69 – Lansing, Flint; Sheridan Avenue	Exit 123 on I-69; roadway continues as Sheridan Avenue
Shiawasee–Genesee county line	Venice–Clayton township line	2.398	3.859	M-21 (Corunna Road) – Flint, Owosso	
Saginaw–Genesee county line	Maple Grove–Montrose township line	14.627	23.540	M-57 – Chesaning, Montrose	
Saginaw	Saginaw	31.196	50.205	M-46 – St. Louis, Sandusky	
Saginaw	Saginaw	35.004– 35.049	56.333– 56.406	M-81 east – Caro	Western terminus of M-81
Saginaw	Buena Vista Township	37.015– 37.033	59.570– 59.599	I-75 / US 23 – Flint, Mackinac Bridge	Exit 153 on I-75
Bay	Bay City	44.517	71.643	M-84 north	Eastern end of M-84 concurrency
Bay	Bay City–Monitor Township line	45.635	73.442	M-84 south (Salzburg Road)	Western end of M-84 concurrency
Bay	Bay City–Bangor Township line	46.817– 46.908	75.345– 75.491	BS I-75 / M-25 / LHCT south to I-75 – Bay City, Midland	South end of LHCT concurrency
Bay	Bangor Township	49.918– 50.008	80.335– 80.480	M-247 north – Bay City State Park	Southern terminus of M-247
Bay	Monitor Township	51.932	83.576	Conn. M-13 south to I-75 south	Northern terminus of Conn. M-13; indirect access from northbound M-13 to southbound Conn. M-13 via Michigan left
Arenac	Standish Township	73.339	118.028	US 23 south to I-75 – Saginaw, Mackinac Bridge US 23 north / LHCT north – Standish, Alpena	North end of LHCT concurrency; roundabout
1.000 mi = 1.609 km; 1.000 km = 0.621 mi: Concurrency terminus

== Connector route ==
Connector M-13
- Location: Kawkawlin
- Length: 2.414 mi (3.885 km)
- Existed: 1967–present

M-13 Connector (Conn. M-13) is a connector route running 2.414 miles (3.885 km) connecting I-75/US 23 to M-13 near the community of Kawkawlin, just north of Bay City. The short freeway was originally the northern end of the US 23 freeway in the area when it opened. The current designation was applied in 1967.
