= Au Gres, Michigan =

- City
- City of Au Gres
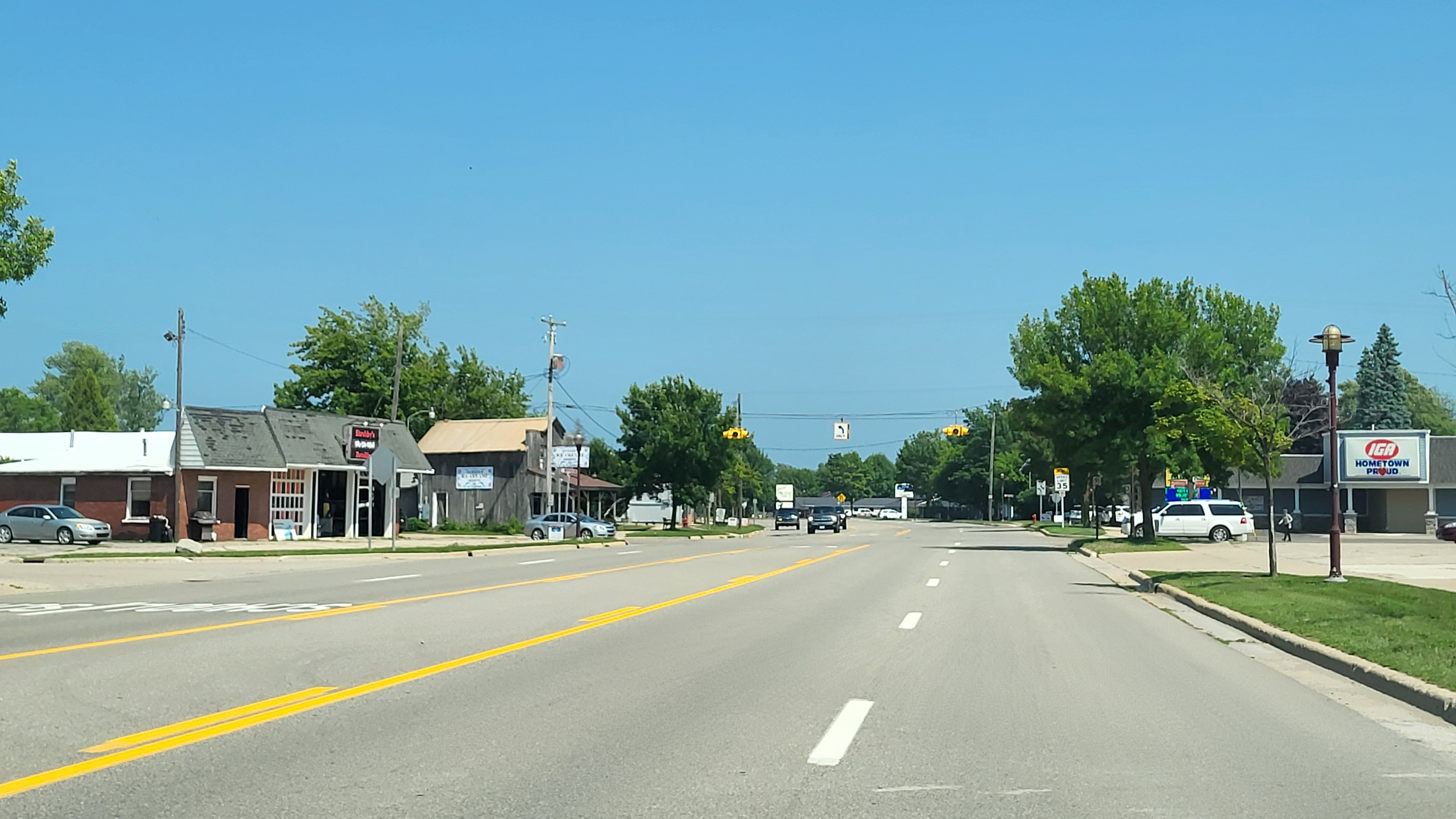
- Looking east along U.S. Route 23

- Flag

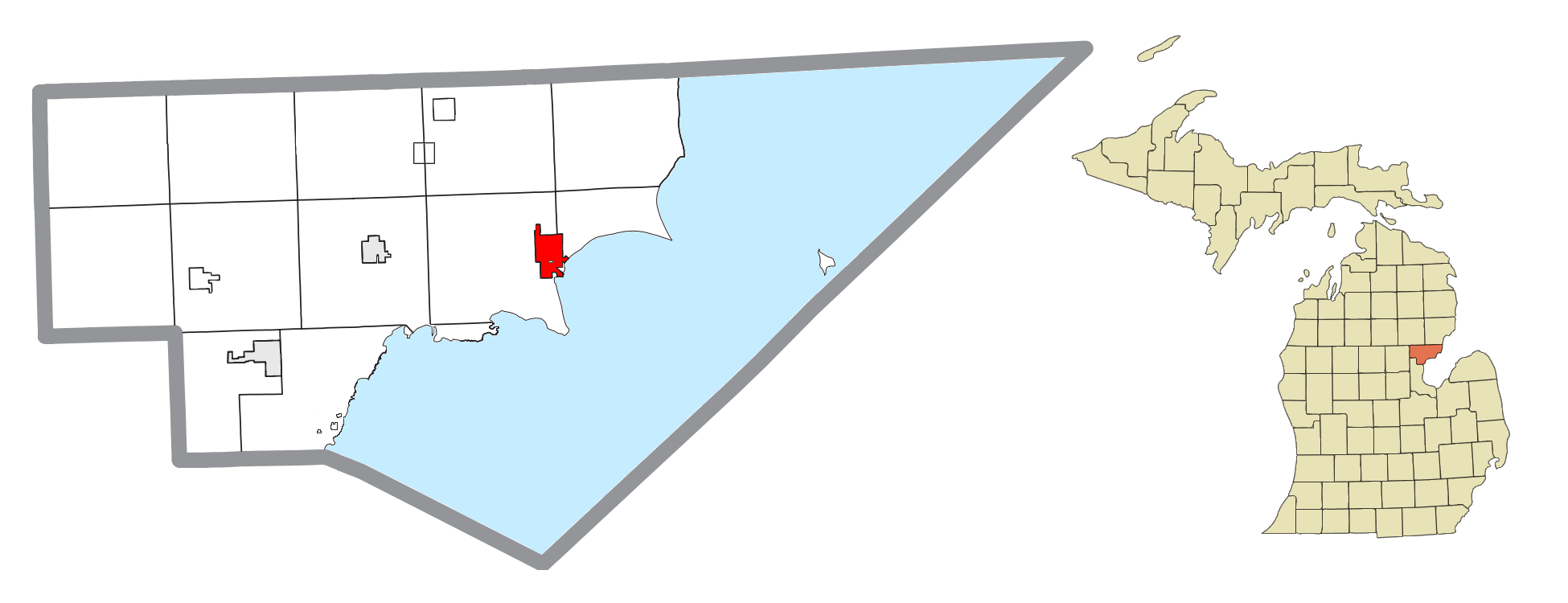
- Location within Arenac County

- Location within the state of Michigan Location within the United States
- Coordinates: 44°02′37″N 83°41′20″W
- Country: United States
- State: Michigan
- County: Arenac
- Incorporated: 1905

Government
  - Type: Council–manager
  - Mayor: Jonathan Sanford
  - City manager: Dale Wiltse

Area
  - Total: 2.38 sq mi (6.16 km^{2})
  - Land: 2.28 sq mi (5.90 km^{2})
  - Water: 0.10 sq mi (0.26 km^{2})
- Elevation: 587 ft (179 m)

Population (2020)
  - Total: 945
  - Density: 415/sq mi (160.2/km^{2})
- Time zone: UTC-5 (Eastern (EST))
  - Summer (DST): UTC-4 (EDT)
- ZIP code(s): 48703
- Area code: 989
- FIPS code: 26-04120
- GNIS feature ID: 0620321
- Website: Official website

Au Gres (/ˈɔːɡreɪ/ AW-gray) is a city in Arenac County in the U.S. state of Michigan. The population was 945 at the 2020 census.

== History ==
French explorers named the location Point Au Grès; grès means "gritty stone" or "sandstone," from which the river and the town take their names. It was first settled in 1862 temporarily by workers on the Saginaw–Au Sable State Road. The first permanent settler was John Edward Bradley, who built the Bradley House in 1866. On August 8, 1867, the location, which was still a part of Bay County, was granted a post office with Bradley as the first postmaster. The post office was closed from March 2, 1874 until April 30, 1874.

The community was incorporated as a city in 1905.

== Geography ==
According to the United States Census Bureau, the city has a total area of 2.33 square miles (6.03 km^{2}), of which 2.23 square miles (5.78 km^{2}) is land and 0.10 square miles (0.26 km^{2}) is water.

== Demographics ==
Historical population
Census	Pop.	Note	%±
1910	252		—
1920	199		−21.0%
1930	203		2.0%
1940	317		56.2%
1950	442		39.4%
1960	584		32.1%
1970	564		−3.4%
1980	768		36.2%
1990	838		9.1%
2000	1,028		22.7%
2010	889		−13.5%
2020	945		6.3%
U.S. Decennial Census

=== 2010 census ===
As of the census of 2010, there were 889 people, 435 households, and 233 families living in the city. The population density was 398.7 inhabitants per square mile (153.9/km^{2}). There were 598 housing units at an average density of 268.2 per square mile (103.6/km^{2}). The racial makeup of the city was 97.5% White, 0.4% Native American, 0.1% from other races, and 1.9% from two or more races. Hispanic or Latino of any race were 1.9% of the population.

There were 435 households, of which 20.5% had children under the age of 18 living with them, 36.6% were married couples living together, 11.7% had a female householder with no husband present, 5.3% had a male householder with no wife present, and 46.4% were non-families. 41.1% of all households were made up of individuals, and 17.7% had someone living alone who was 65 years of age or older. The average household size was 2.00 and the average family size was 2.65.

The median age in the city was 49.8 years. 17.9% of residents were under the age of 18; 6.8% were between the ages of 18 and 24; 19.4% were from 25 to 44; 30.3% were from 45 to 64; and 25.5% were 65 years of age or older. The gender makeup of the city was 52.1% male and 47.9% female.

=== 2000 census ===
As of the census of 2000, there were 1,028 people, 468 households, and 285 families living in the city. The population density was 450.1 inhabitants per square mile (173.8/km^{2}). There were 733 housing units at an average density of 321.0 per square mile (123.9/km^{2}). The racial makeup of the city was 95.43% White, 0.29% African American, 1.17% Native American, 0.29% Asian, 0.10% Pacific Islander, and 2.72% from two or more races. Hispanic or Latino of any race were 0.49% of the population.

There were 468 households, out of which 24.6% had children under the age of 18 living with them, 47.2% were married couples living together, 9.8% had a female householder with no husband present, and 39.1% were non-families. 35.0% of all households were made up of individuals, and 15.6% had someone living alone who was 65 years of age or older. The average household size was 2.15 and the average family size was 2.76.

In the city, the population was spread out, with 21.1% under the age of 18, 8.5% from 18 to 24, 23.6% from 25 to 44, 25.6% from 45 to 64, and 21.2% who were 65 years of age or older. The median age was 43 years. For every 100 females, there were 98.8 males. For every 100 females age 18 and over, there were 92.2 males.

The median income for a household in the city was $24,511, and the median income for a family was $34,348. Males had a median income of $26,641 versus $18,295 for females. The per capita income for the city was $15,229. About 17.5% of families and 17.5% of the population were below the poverty line, including 29.0% of those under age 18 and 10.9% of those age 65 or over.

== Transportation ==
- US 23 serves Au Gres on its way along the Lake Huron shoreline. It has been designated the Sunrise Side Coastal Highway, and runs along (or parallels) the Lake Huron shore.
- Indian Trails provides daily intercity bus service between St. Ignace and Bay City, Michigan.
- A ferry service runs from mid-May to mid-October from Au Gres to Charity Island, which is ten miles (16 km) to the east in the middle of Saginaw Bay.
