= National Register of Historic Places listings in Presque Isle County, Michigan =

Location of Presque Isle County in Michigan

This is a list of the National Register of Historic Places listings in Presque Isle County, Michigan.

This is intended to be a complete list of the properties and districts on the National Register of Historic Places in Presque Isle County, Michigan, United States. Latitude and longitude coordinates are provided for many National Register properties and districts; these locations may be seen together in a map.

There are 15 properties and districts listed on the National Register in the county.

This National Park Service list is complete through NPS recent listings posted August 14, 2026.

== Current listings ==
	Name on the Register	Image	Date listed	Location	City or town	Description
1	Camp Black Lake	Camp Black Lake	April 6, 2021 (#100006365)	7142 Ocqueoc Lake Rd. 45°28′52″N 84°06′45″W	Ocqueoc Township	A former Civilian Conservation Corps camp, this property is now known as the Ocqueoc Outdoor Center, and is used for youth and adult outdoor activities. It is significant as one of only two surviving CCC camps in Michigan, out of the 122 different original camp locations.
2	CHOCTAW (shipwreck)	CHOCTAW (shipwreck)	December 10, 2018 (#100003214)	Lake Huron, approximately five miles east of Presque Isle Light; 45°19′00″N 83°23′00″W	Presque Isle	The Choctaw was a semi-whaleback ship (one of three built) that sank on Lake Huron in 1915 following a collision with the Canadian package freighter Wahcondah.
3	F.T. Barney Shipwreck	F.T. Barney Shipwreck	August 19, 1991 (#91001016)	Lake Huron; 45°29′09″N 83°50′33″W	Rogers City vicinity	The F.T. Barney was a schooner built in 1856. It sank in 1868 in a collision with another schooner; the wreck lay undiscovered until 1987. It is in 160 feet of water, and is one of the most complete of a schooner of its era.
4	Joseph S. Fay Shipwreck Site	Joseph S. Fay Shipwreck Site	February 8, 2018 (#100001838)	Off of Forty Mile Point Lighthouse in L. Huron; 45°29′19″N 83°54′36″W	Rogers City vicinity	
5	Forty Mile Point Light Station	Forty Mile Point Light Station	July 19, 1984 (#84001830)	Presque Isle County Park; 45°29′10″N 83°54′49″W	Rogers Township	In the mid-1800s, as lights were built along the coasts of the Great Lakes, the New Presque Isle Light's range of visibility of 19 miles (31 km) and the Cheboygan Crib Light's visible range of 13 miles (21 km) left an unlighted 18-mile (29 km) intervening stretch of coastline along which mariners had to navigate blind. In 1895, money was appropriated to build this light, 40 miles (64 km) south of Mackinac Point. The plan for this light is nearly identical to the one for the Big Bay Point Lighthouse on Lake Superior that was constructed at the same time.
6	NORMAN (shipwreck)	NORMAN (shipwreck)	November 22, 2016 (#16000819)	Lake Huron, 10.35 miles (16.66 km) east-southeast of Presque Isle Museum; 45°18′42″N 83°16′44″W	Presque Isle Township	The Norman was built in 1890 by the Globe Iron Works in Cleveland, Ohio. She was one of the first propeller-driven steel lakers that hauled iron and coal on the Great Lakes. On May 30, 1895, the Norman and the steamer Jack collided in the fog. She currently lies in 210 feet of water.
7	P. H. Hoeft State Park	P. H. Hoeft State Park	December 8, 2009 (#09001065)	5001 U.S. 23 North; 45°28′34″N 83°54′06″W	Rogers City vicinity	Hoeft State Park is built on land donated in 1922 by lumber baron Paul H. Hoeft. The heavily wooded park sits on 1-mile (1.6 km) of Lake Huron shoreline and offers 143 campsites along with 4 miles (6.4 km) of hiking trails, hunting, play grounds, a picnic pavilion and a lodge erected in the late 1930s by the Civilian Conservation Corps.
8	Ocqueoc Falls Highway–Ocqueoc River Bridge		December 17, 1999 (#99001536)	Ocqueoc Falls Highway over the Ocqueoc River; 45°23′43″N 84°03′28″W	Ocqueoc Township	The Ocqueoc Falls Highway–Ocqueoc River Bridge, built in 1920, is significant as a well-preserved early example of concrete arch bridges constructed by the Michigan State Highway Department.
9	Old Presque Isle Lighthouse	Old Presque Isle Lighthouse	April 11, 1973 (#73000957)	Off CR 405; 45°21′24″N 83°28′46″W	Presque Isle	The Old Presque Isle Light was the first lighthouse in the Presque Isle, Michigan area. The light was built in 1840, and was constructed of two-thirds stone and one-third brick. However, the tower and dwelling did not last long in the harsh weather, however, and by 1867 they were deteriorated enough for Congress to find need for a newer station. The New Presque Isle Light was constructed in 1870, and the Old Presque Isle Light was deactivated in 1871. The old light currently serves as a museum.
10	Onaway State Park	Onaway State Park	December 8, 2009 (#09001066)	3622 M-211 North; 45°25′53″N 84°13′45″W	North Allis Township	One of the oldest state parks in Michigan, Onaway State Park was dedicated in 1921. Located on Black Lake, it contains sand cobblestone beaches, large rock outcroppings, a campground, and a nature trail highlighting a diversity of trees.
11	Presque Isle County Courthouse	Presque Isle County Courthouse	April 3, 1980 (#80001889)	20774 State Street; 45°21′28″N 84°13′47″W	Onaway	This building, also known as the Onaway Courthouse, was constructed in 1908 by Merritt Chandler in an effort to wrest the county seat away from Rogers City. Although he was unsuccessful, as a compromise county court sessions were alternated between Rogers City and Onaway until the 1940s. The building now houses a public library, Historical Museum, the Chamber of Commerce, and offices of the City of Onaway.
12	Presque Isle Light Station	Presque Isle Light Station	August 4, 1983 (#83000890)	Presque Isle; 45°21′23″N 83°29′33″W	Presque Isle Township	The New Presque Isle Light was built in 1870 to replace the deteriorating Old Presque Isle Light. U.S. Army Corps of Engineers Major Orlando M. Poe designed the light, with a tapered tower and connected keeper's quarters. The design was so elegant that several other lighthouses around the Great Lakes were built to similar specifications.
13	Presque Isle Lodge	Presque Isle Lodge	February 1, 2008 (#07001490)	8211 E. Grand Lake Rd. 45°18′06″N 83°28′38″W	Presque Isle	The Presque Isle Lodge is a 10,000 square foot Rustic log structure, constructed in 1920. Currently operating as a bed and breakfast, it contains a large collection of original rustic log furniture.
14	Radka–Bradley House	Radka–Bradley House	August 5, 1991 (#91001019)	176 W. Michigan Ave. 45°25′13″N 83°49′05″W	Rogers City	The Radka–Bradley House, also known as just the Bradley House, was for 13 years the home of Carl D. Bradley, who propelled the Michigan Limestone and Chemical Company to national prominence. After Bradley's death, his successors as Michigan Limestone's CEO lived in the house; it now serves as the Presque Isle County Historical Museum.
15	Rogers Theater	Rogers Theater	August 28, 2024 (#100010780)	257 North 3rd Street; 45°25′15″N 83°49′03″W	Rogers City	
16	KYLE SPANGLER (schooner) Shipwreck Site	KYLE SPANGLER (schooner) Shipwreck Site	August 22, 2016 (#14001098)	Lake Huron, 4 miles (6.4 km) northeast of Presque Isle; 45°23′01″N 83°26′07″W	Presque Isle Township	The Kyle Spangler was a wooden schooner built in 1856. She sank in 1860 after a collision with another schooner; the wreck is remarkably undamaged.

== See also ==
- List of National Historic Landmarks in Michigan
- National Register of Historic Places listings in Michigan
- Listings in neighboring counties: Alpena, Cheboygan
- List of Great Lakes shipwrecks on the National Register of Historic Places
