= List of Michigan State Historic Sites in Presque Isle County =

Location of Presque Isle County in Michigan

The following is a list of Michigan State Historic Sites in Presque Isle County, Michigan. Sites marked with a dagger (†) are also listed on the National Register of Historic Places in Presque Isle County, Michigan.

== Current listings ==
Name	Image	Location	City	Listing date
Burnham's Landing Informational Designation		Burnham's Landing Park, Grand Lake Rd at the foot of Pine View Street	Presque Isle	October 15, 1992
Elowsky Mill		Leer Road at intersection of Long Lake Road	Posen	November 18, 2000
Forty Mile Point Lighthouse† / Lake Huron Graveyard of Ships		Presque Isle County Park along US-23, 7 miles north of Rogers City	Rogers Township	2007
John C. Kauffman House		7993 East Grand Lake Road	Presque Isle	April 22, 1993
Lake Huron Informational Designation		Roadside Park on US-23, Huron Beach, near Hammond Bay Refuge Harbor, 26 miles north of Rogers City	Rogers Township	January 19, 1957
Metz Fire Informational Designation		Metz Township Hall, Gramba Road	Metz	February 27, 1970
Michigan Limestone and Chemical Company Quarry		1035 Calcite Road	Rogers City	May 1, 1959
Old Presque Isle Lighthouse†		5295 Grand Lake Road (Presque Isle Harbor)	Presque Isle Township	October 14, 1964
Presque Isle County Courthouse†		20774 State Street	Onaway	May 17, 1978
Presque Isle Electric Cooperative Monument		Between 10957 and 10981 Michigan Street	Posen	October 23, 1987
Presque Isle Front Range Light		5779 East Grand Lake Rd	Presque Isle Township	2006
Presque Isle Light Station†		4500 Grand Lake Road, N end of Presque Isle Harbor Peninsula	Presque Isle Township	June 30, 1988
Presque Isle Lodge†		8211 East Grand Lake Road	Presque Isle Township	2012

== See also ==
- National Register of Historic Places listings in Presque Isle County, Michigan

== Sources ==
- Historic Sites Online – Presque Isle County. Michigan State Housing Developmental Authority. Accessed May 29, 2011.
