= USLHT Warrington =

US Lighthouse Tender

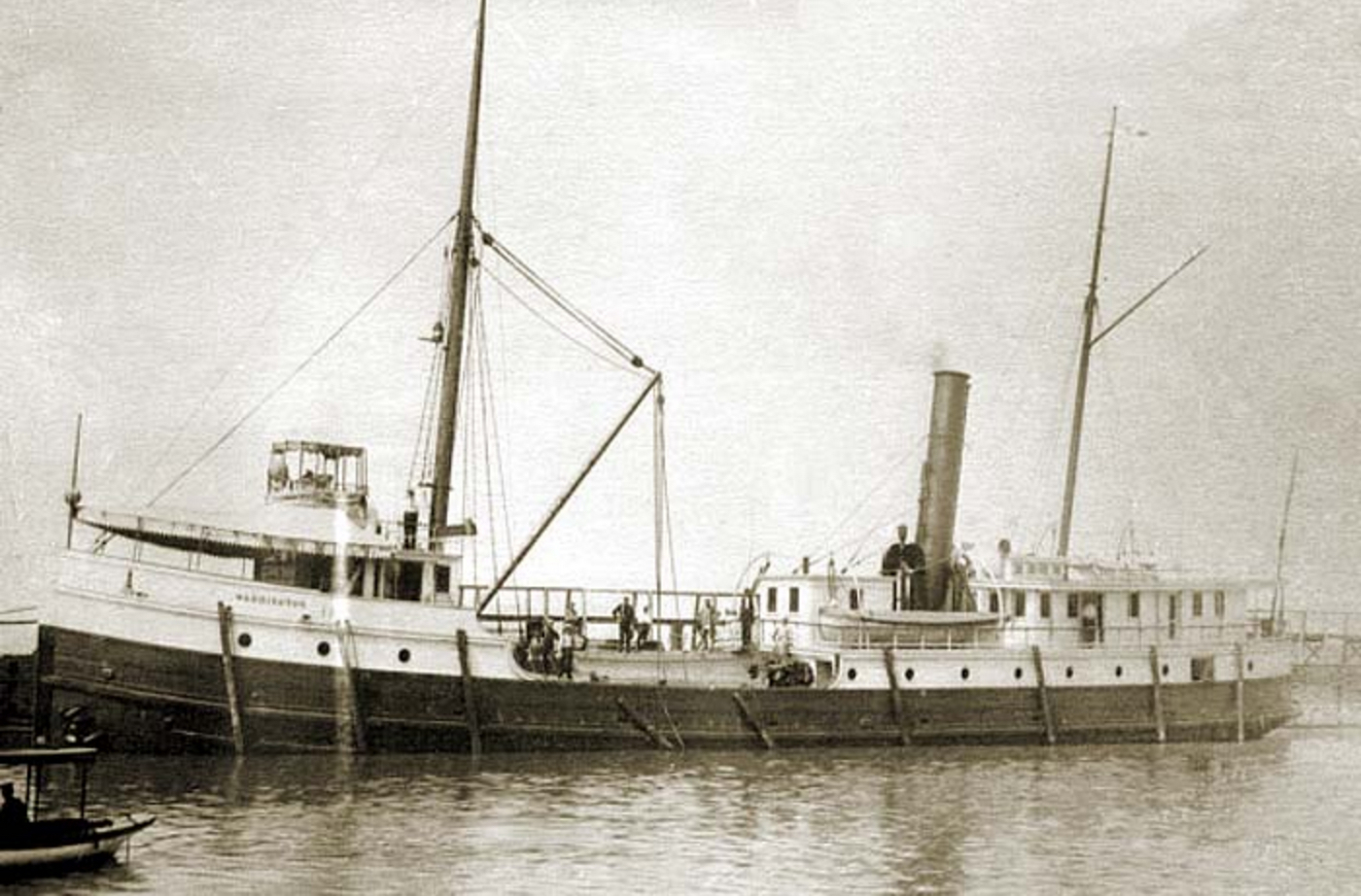
- USLHT Warrington, likely after her 1898 refit

History

United States
- Name: Henry Warrington
- Builder: J. M. Jones
- Cost: $35,000
- Launched: 1868
- Identification: Official number 11857
- Fate: Sold

United States
- Name: USLHT Warrington
- Operator: US Lighthouse Service
- Cost: $25,000
- Commissioned: 1870
- Decommissioned: 1910
- Identification: Signal letters GVMR
- Fate: Sold 11 January 1911

United States
- Name: Warrington
- Operator: Edward Hines Lumber Company
- Cost: $1,400
- Identification: Official number 11857
- Fate: Wrecked 21 August 1911

General characteristics
- Tonnage: 410 Gross register tons; 244 Net register tons
- Length: 260 ft (79 m)
- Beam: 25 ft 6 in (7.77 m)
- Draft: 12 ft 6 in (3.81 m)
- Propulsion: Steam engine; single propeller
- Complement: 20 (1898)

The United States Lighthouse Tender Warrington was a lighthouse tender which served on the Great Lakes. She was built in 1868, and began life as the freighter Henry Warrington. Rechristened Warrington, she began government service in 1870. She participated in the construction and maintenance of a number of significant lighthouses and other aids to navigation over a 40-year career with the U.S. Lighthouse Service. At the end of her government service, she was sold to a commercial shipping company and wrecked in 1911.

== Construction and characteristics ==
Henry Warrington was built in the J. M. Jones shipyard in Detroit, Michigan. She was built as a freighter in a style known on the Great Lakes as a "steam barge". Her owners were Redmond and John Prindiville, and Thomas Brown of Chicago, Illinois. She was launched in 1868. Her initial cost was approximately $35,000.

Henry Warrington's hull was built of wood. She was 155 feet (47 m) long overall, with a beam of 26 feet 6 inches (8.08 m), a depth of hold of 10 feet (3.0 m) Her gross register tonnage was 410, and her net register tonnage was 244.

The ship was propelled by a single propeller which was driven by a steam engine. She had a single coal-fired boiler which was found to be inadequate by the Lighthouse Service and was replaced in August 1870 by a larger boiler which was 18 feet (5.5 m) long and 8 feet (2.4 m) in diameter. Her original high-pressure engine was replaced in 1878 at Detroit Drydock Company. Her new low-pressure machinery was a vertical direct-acting condensing steam engine with a single cylinder with a bore of 36 inches (0.91 m) and a stroke of 30 inches (0.76 m). This engine had an indicated horsepower of 485.

On 12 March 1879, the deckhouse of the ship was substantially damaged by fire. After the fire, Warrington was substantially rebuilt at Clark's Drydock in Detroit. Her hull was substantially replanked, and a significant number of her frames were replaced. Her deck and the stanchions which supported it were replaced, increasing her depth of hold by 20 inches (51 cm). Her house was rebuilt with seven staterooms and a large saloon. The cost of the rebuild was about $13,000.

The ship underwent a major refit from August 1897 to April 1898, just prior to her transfer from the 11th to the 10th Lighthouse Districts. A replacement boiler was installed. Electric lights, including a searchlight, were installed for $1,590. A steam heating system, with radiators in all rooms, was added. Speaking tubes were installed. A forecastle deck was built, and on it were placed the pilothouse, captain's cabin, chart room, and Texas. The mate's and quartermaster's staterooms, and a men's bathroom were built under the forecastle deck on the main deck. The aft cabin on the main deck was rearranged to provide a galley, officers' and crew dining areas, pantry, icebox, storeroom, officers' bathroom, and staterooms for the cook, and two engineers. Above this aft cabin, on what was termed the "spar deck" was a salon, two staterooms, a bathroom, pantry, and linen closet. An office for the District Engineer was built forward of the smokestack on the spar deck.

In 1898 Warrington had a crew of 20.

== Commercial service (1868-1870) ==
On her first paying voyage to her new homeport of Chicago, Henry Warrington carried 250,000 board feet of lumber from Saginaw. She arrived on 26 June 1868. During her commercial service she frequently carried lumber, but also cargos of corn, flour, and pig iron.

=== Significant events ===
The barque Nucleus was leaking and in danger of sinking when she met Henry Warrington underway in Lake Michigan. The steamer took her in tow and loaned her some of her crew to man the pumps. She brought Nucleus safely to Chicago on 5 July 1868.

On 27 August 1868, Henry Warrington was sailing between Chicago and Goderich, Ontario with a cargo of corn when she ran aground near Fox Point, Wisconsin in a thick fog. The tug G. W. Tift was dispatched from Milwaukee and was able to pull her free later that day. Henry Warrington sustained no damage and continued her trip.

Henry Warrington and the tug Union were dispatched on 6 November 1868 to refloat the schooner David Stewart, aground on Pilot Island. The salvage effort was successful.

A series of gales in mid-November 1869 sank or drove ashore 97 vessels in the Great Lakes, Henry Warrington among them. She was blown ashore by the winds in Saginaw Bay near the mouth of the Au Sable River. The tug Champion was able to refloat her.

== U.S. Lighthouse Service (1870-1911) ==
=== 11th Lighthouse District (1870-1898) ===
The U.S. Lighthouse Service purchased Henry Warrington in January 1870 for $25,000. At this time the Lighthouse Service was controlled by the U.S. Lighthouse Board, a bureau of the U.S. Department of the Treasury. In this quasi-military organization, each Lighthouse District had an Inspector, typically a U.S. Navy officer, and an Engineer, typically an officer of the Army Corps of Engineers. Warrington was initially assigned to the Engineer of the 11th Lighthouse District, whose responsibility was constructing and maintaining lighthouses and other aids to navigation in Lake Michigan, Lake Huron, Lake Superior, and adjacent waterways. The ship was based at Detroit. On 1 January 1887, she was reassigned to the Inspector of the 11th Lighthouse District, where her primary responsibility was supplying lighthouses and maintaining buoys. Also in 1887, the Lighthouse Board split the 11th Lighthouse District, creating a new 9th Lighthouse District which had responsibility for Lake Michigan. While Warrington remained assigned to the 11th Lighthouse District, she continued to support light stations in Lake Michigan on behalf of the new 9th District.

Since the freshwater Great Lakes froze in the winter, Warrington's work varied with the calendar. She could only sail during the "navigation season," approximately April to November when the lakes were free of ice. During the winter she was idle or undergoing maintenance. During the first months of 1870, just after her purchase by the Lighthouse Service, she underwent modifications for her new role. Her name was changed to simply Warrington. Her hull and decks were strengthened to carry the stone and rock used to build lighthouses. A steam-powered derrick was added so that she could move these heavy objects.

==== Lighthouse construction and maintenance ====
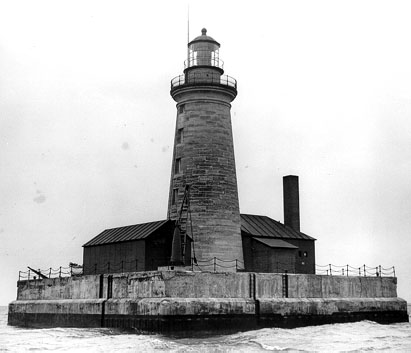
Spectacle Reef Light, which Warrington helped build in 1870-1872

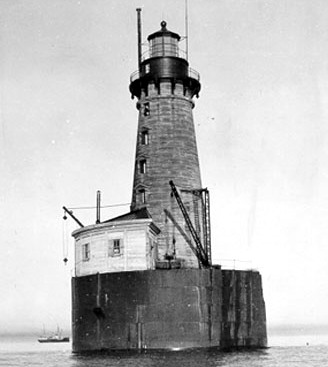
Stannard Rock Light, which Warrington labored to construct from 1877 to 1882

While supporting the District Engineer, Warrington hauled materials and laborers, and towed other vessels carrying construction materials to support the construction of new lighthouses including Bar Point Light, Belle Isle Light, Devil's Island Light, Grand Marais Light, Little Point Sauble Light, Little Traverse Light, Old Presque Isle Light, Passage Island Light, Port Austin Reef Light, Seul Choix Light, Spectacle Reef Light, and Stannard Rock Light. She also repaired or improved a number of lighthouses including Beaver Island Light, Eagle Harbor Light, Fort Gratiot Light, Granite Island Light, Gull Rock Light, Manitou Island, Poverty Island Light, Sherwood Point Light, Waugoshance Light, and Whitefish Point Light.

==== Lighthouse supply and buoy maintenance ====
Due to their remote locations, many lighthouses were supplied from the sea. While assigned to the District Inspector, providing supplies and maintaining buoys were Warrington's main missions. In 1890, for example, Warrington delivered 285 tons of coal, 25 cords of wood, and 9,625 gallons of lamp oil, plus food, fresh water, and other provisions to 95 lighthouses and fog signals. That same year she serviced 132 buoys.

==== Significant events ====
In November 1873, Warrington assisted the schooner Belle Stephens to refloat after she had gone aground near Skillagalee Island Light.

During June 1879, General W. T. Sherman, his daughter, General Godfrey Weitzel, Engineer of the 11th Lighthouse District, and their party toured forts and other military installations in the Great Lakes aboard Warrington.

In May 1887, Warrington towed the coal-laden schooner Owasco off the shore where she had stranded during a gale in Mackinac Straits. Later that same month, Warrington was dispatched to the aid of USLHT Dahlia which had run aground at Presque Isle Harbor due to poor visibility in forest fire smoke.

=== 10th Lighthouse District (1898-1911) ===
On 25 April 1898, Warrington was transferred to the District Engineer of the 10th Lighthouse District. Her new homeport was Buffalo. Once again her main mission was to build and maintain lighthouses, but this time in Lake Erie, Lake Ontario, and surrounding waterways.

The District Engineer used Warrington to deliver materials and workers to remote lighthouse sites. Among the lighthouse construction projects she support were the Toledo Harbor Light, and the Ashtabula Harbor Light. The ship repaired or improved a number of existing lighthouses including the Marblehead Light. As with her service in the 11th Lighthouse District, Warrington delivered fuel, food, and other supplies to the lighthouse keepers in the 10th District. Among those she supplied were the Fair Haven Light.

==== Obsolescence and sale ====
As early as 1888, when Warrington was 20 years old, the Lighthouse Board began considering replacing the ship. It reported that year that, "This steam barge is so old and worn that she will scarcely be fit for duty through another year." The Board's proposal to build Warrington's replacement for $85,000 was rejected by Congress that same year. The ship received a number of costly repairs and refits until 1910 when she was condemned as "unseaworthy; not worth repair." In November 1910, the Inspector of the 10th Lighthouse District sought sealed bids for the sale of Warrington. He received only one, and the ship was sold on 14 January 1911 to the Edward Hines Lumber Company of Chicago for $1,400.

== Commercial service and loss (1911) ==
On 21 August 1911, Warrington was en route from East Jordan, Michigan to Chicago with a load of white pine lumber when she went aground on South Point, about a mile south of Charlevoix, Michigan. Her crew reached shore safely, but the ship was pounded by northwest wind and waves and broke up. Her cargo of lumber washed ashore. Warrington was a total loss.
