= Rogers City Area Schools =

School district in Michigan, United States

Address
- 1033 West Huron Avenue Suite B Rogers City, Presque Isle County, Michigan, 49779; United States

District information
- Grades: Kindergarten–12
- Superintendent: Nicholas C. Hein
- Schools: 2
- Budget: $7,349,000 2022–2023 expenditures
- NCES District ID: 2630060

Students and staff
- Students: 434 (2024–2025)
- Teachers: 25.25 (on an FTE basis) (2024–2025)
- Staff: 64.72 FTE (2024–2025)
- Student–teacher ratio: 17.19 (2024–2025)
- District mascot: Hurons

Other information
- Website: www.rcashurons.org

Rogers City Area Schools is a public school district in Northern Michigan. In Presque Isle County, it serves Rogers City, the townships of Moltke and Rogers, and parts of the townships of Belknap, Bismarck, and Metz.

== History ==
The previous Rogers City High School was built in 1928. Presque Isle County's school districts were reorganized in 1960, and several small districts with one-room schoolhouses consolidated with Rogers City's district.

The current middle/high school opened in fall 1963. J. and G. Daverman Co. of Grand Rapids was the building's architecture firm. They used a new modular steel construction system from U.S. Steel called AmBridge. According to the Bay City Times, the building uses "colorful porcelain enamel on the exterior walls with tinted vinyl-coated steel partitions on the interior. Walls are only 2 1/2 inches thick but provide full thermal and acoustical insulation." The previous high school then became a school for grades five through eight.

== Schools ==
Schools in Rogers City Area Schools district share a campus on the southwest side of Rogers City.

Schools in Rogers City Area Schools District district
School	Address	Notes
Rogers City Middle & High School	1033 West Huron Avenue, Rogers City	Grades 6–12
Rogers City Elementary	532 West Erie Street, Rogers City	Grades K-5
