= Huron Sunrise Trail =

Bicycle and hiking trail in Michigan, USA

Coordinates: 45°25′6″N 83°48′27″W

The Huron Sunrise Trail is a 11-mile (18 km) bicycle and hiking trail in Michigan that follows a section of the shoreline of Lake Huron north and west of Rogers City, Michigan. The trail, which is entirely contained within Presque Isle County, largely follows a section of the former roadbed of the Detroit and Mackinac Railway.

The trail connects a series of recreational areas that were used as quarries for smelter stone and construction aggregate, which are major industries of Presque Isle County. The trail also connects a key harbor, used in former times to ship the aggregate, with the lighthouse that guarded the freight boats on their way to markets in Lake Michigan. Points of interest along the trail, from south to north, include:

- Rogers City
- Hoeft State Park
- Forty Mile Point Light

== See also ==
- Great Lakes Lore Maritime Museum, a small Rogers City museum that describes the work of shipping smelter stone and aggregate.
