= Rogers Theater =

- U.S. National Register of Historic Places
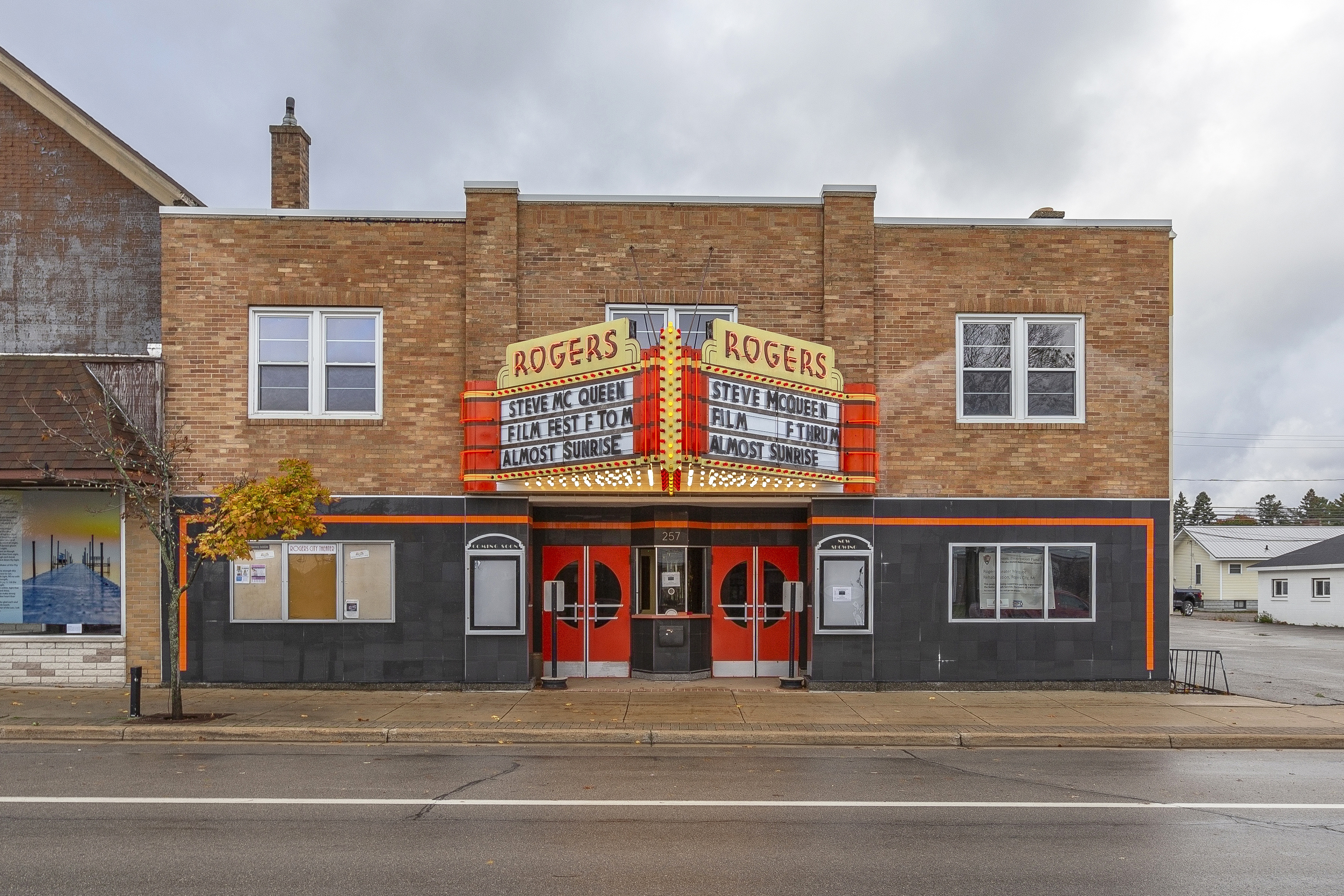
- Interactive map
- Location: 257 North 3rd St., Rogers City
- Coordinates: 45°25′25″N 83°49′3″W
- Built: 1937
- Built by: Karl Vogelheim
- Architect: Charles Vogelheim and Walter Kelley
- Architectural style: Art Moderne
- NRHP reference No.: 100010780
- Added to NRHP: August 28, 2024

The Rogers Theater is a movie theatre located at 257 North 3rd Street in Rogers City, Michigan. It was listed on the National Register of Historic Places in 2024.

== History ==
In approximately 1934, businessman Charles A. Vogelheim and theater operator Walter Kelley began a partnership to construct a new movie theater. Vogelheim owned a lumber company, and construction occurred under the direction of his son Karl. The construction evidently took some years, and the building opened in 1937 as a 500-seat motion picture theater. Kelley managed the theater for ten years until his retirement in 1947, after which Vogelheim took over the business.

In January 1948, a fire started in the building, destroying the interior of the building. However, the building was quickly renovated and expanded, and the theater was reopened later in the year as a 650-seat venue. The Vogelheim family continued to operate the theater with Charles's son Richard taking over in 1961. In 2002, local resident Karl Heidemann purchased the building. He renovated the theater interior to install a stage. In the 2010s, the Presque Isle District Library purchased the building, and in 2023 renovated the façade.

== Description ==
The Rogers Theater is a two-story rectangular Art Moderne movie theater measuring 118 by 48 feet. The façade is three bays wide, with a recessed central entrance bay containing a box office surrounded by two pairs of metal doors. The remainder of the first floor is clad in black structural glass. Above, the second floor is clad in brick. Each bay contains a pair of one-over-one metal windows with projecting brick sills.
