= Hoeft State Park =

Park in Michigan, USA

P. H. Hoeft State Park
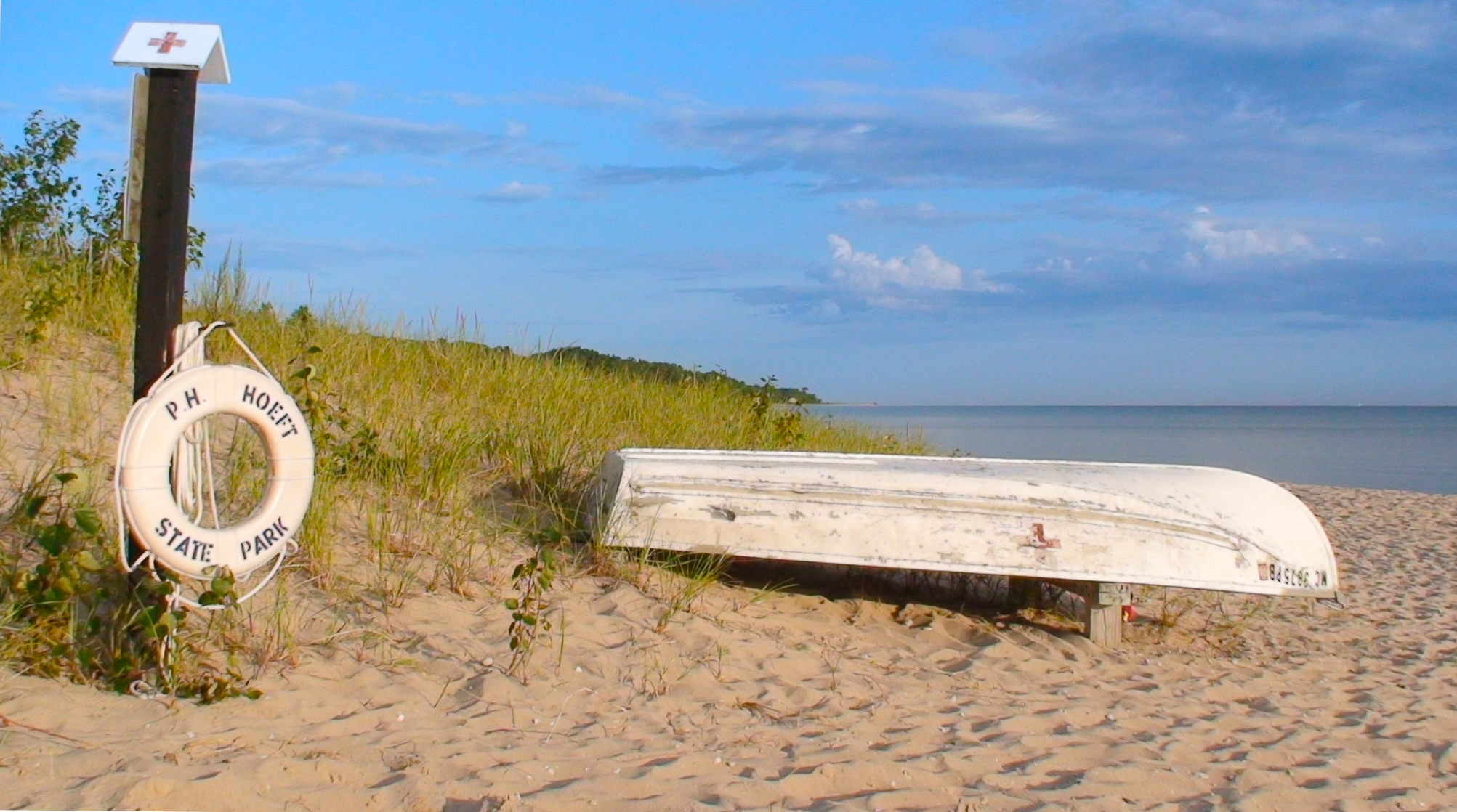
- Beach at Hoeft State Park

- Location within Michigan Location within the United States
- Location: Rogers Township, Presque Isle County, Michigan, United States
- Nearest city: Rogers City, Michigan
- Coordinates: 45°27′45″N 83°52′48″W
- Area: 301 acres (122 ha)
- Elevation: 607 feet (185 m)
- Established: 1920
- Administrator: Michigan Department of Natural Resources
- Designation: Michigan state park
- Website: Official website
- P.H. Hoeft State Park
- U.S. National Register of Historic Places
- Location: 5001 U.S. 23 North, Rogers Township, Michigan
- Architect: Ralph B. Herrick
- NRHP reference No.: 09001065
- Added to NRHP: December 8, 2009

P. H. Hoeft State Park is a public recreation area on the shores of Lake Huron, four miles (6.4 km) northwest of Rogers City on US 23 in Presque Isle County, Michigan. The park was added to the National Register of Historic Places in 2009.

== History ==
Paul H. Hoeft was a local Rogers City lumberman, who acquired parcels of land in the area in the early 1900s. In 1920, soon after the establishment of the Michigan state park system, Hoeft offered to donate land to the state to create a park. At the time the state was also upgrading the main trunkline running through Rogers City - now US23 - and area tourism was on an upswing. Paul H. Hoeft State Park was formally established in 1921. A picnic area was immediately constructed, and substantial development came in 1923 after the US23 improvements were completed. An early campsite loop was developed, and a log and stone bathhouse was constructed. A concrete bandstand and a play area were constructed in 1926–27, and in 1929 a two-story frame house was built for the park manager.

In 1933, additional development was undertaken as part of the Civilian Conservation Corps. CCC workers constructed foot trails, a gravel road, and a garage/workshop. In addition, they implemented an extensive reforestation project, planting over 50,000 seedlings. Over the next few years, the park entrance was moved and a new parking lot was constructed. In addition, water and sewer services were connected to the campground and day use areas. In 1937, the earlier bathhouse was demolished and work began on a new replacement, designed by architect Ralph B. Herrick.

Further infrastructure improvements were made in the 1940s and 1950s, including a new water system, electrical work, and a laundry building. In the 1960s a new campground loop was added, and in the 1970s the campground roads were paved.

== Description ==
The heavily wooded Hoeft State Park sits on 1 mile (1.6 km) of Lake Huron shoreline and offers 144 campsites along with 4 miles (6.4 km) of hiking trails, hunting, playgrounds, a picnic pavilion and a lodge. The Huron Sunrise Trail bicycle path connects the park to Rogers City and the 40 Mile Lighthouse county park.

The day use area contains a parking lot and beach with an associated picnic and play area, and a picnic shelter/bathhouse. The picnic shelter is situated just off of the beach and was erected in the late 1930s by the Civilian Conservation Corps. With its open beam construction, split rock foundation, large floor, fireplace and separate changing rooms this pavilion offers facilities for a family picnic or family reunion.

The campground consists of two loops. The westernmost contains the original 66 campsites constructed in the 1920s. A 1930s CCC landscaping plan gives these sites plenty of shade. In the 1960s, additional campsites were constructed on the western loop, and an eastern loop added, giving the campground 76 new campsites. The campground has a 1937-38 toilet building sided with clapboard on a stone foundation. A second toilet building was constructed in 1962.

The Park Ranger cabin originally purchased from a Sears and Roebuck catalog in 1929 was the home of the park caretaker until its retirement in 2006. It has since been reopened as a year-round lodge that sleeps eight people and offers modern amenities such as electricity, bathrooms and a kitchen.

== Activities and amenities ==
The park offers swimming, a four-and-half-mile hiking trail, cross-country skiing, picnicking, campgrounds, and lodge. A trail connects the park to the Huron Sunrise Trail which parallels Lake Huron from Rogers City to the 40 Mile Lighthouse.
