= Ocqueoc Falls Highway–Ocqueoc River Bridge =

- U.S. National Register of Historic Places
- Location within Michigan Location within the United States
- Interactive map
- Location: Ocqueoc Falls Highway over Ocqueoc R., Ocqueoc Township, Michigan
- Coordinates: 45°23′43″N 84°3′28″W
- Area: less than one acre
- Built: 1920
- Built by: John Decker
- Architect: Michigan State Highway Department
- Architectural style: Spandrel arch
- MPS: Highway Bridges of Michigan MPS
- NRHP reference No.: 99001536
- Added to NRHP: December 17, 1999

The Ocqueoc Falls Highway–Ocqueoc River Bridge is a highway bridge located on the Ocqueoc Falls Highway over Ocqueoc River in Ocqueoc Township, Michigan. It was listed on the National Register of Historic Places in 1999. It is significant as a well-preserved early example of concrete arch bridges constructed by the Michigan State Highway Department.

== History ==
In 1913, the state of Michigan authorized the designation of a state trunkline system, stipulating that the Michigan State Highway Department would build and maintain bridges of 30 feet (9.1 m) or more on trunk line routes. Soon after, a trunkline route across Presque Isle County was designated, with most of the road improvements completed by 1915. However, it was not until 1919 that the Michigan State Highway Department began work on designing this bridge, designated Trunk Line Bridge No. 253. Bids were solicited, and eventually Rogers City contractor John Decker was awarded an $8,849 contract to construct this bridge. Work was completed in 1920.

This section of the trunkline was later incorporated into US-23 and M-68. In 1954, the main highway was rerouted over another bridge, but this one continued to carry local traffic.

== Description ==
The Ocqueoc Falls Highway–Ocqueoc River Bridge is 57 feet (17 m) long, with a structure width of 23 feet (7.0 m) and a roadway width of 20 feet (6.1 m). The structure of the bridge is as a 50 feet (15 m) filled spandrel arch with an elliptical profile sitting on concrete abutments. The ring arch is corbelled and the concrete guardrails include panels. Bronze plates reading "Trunk Line Bridge" are mounted inside the guardrail walls. The structure is somewhat deteriorated, but remains in unaltered condition.
