= Presque Isle Lodge =

- U.S. National Register of Historic Places
- Michigan State Historic Site
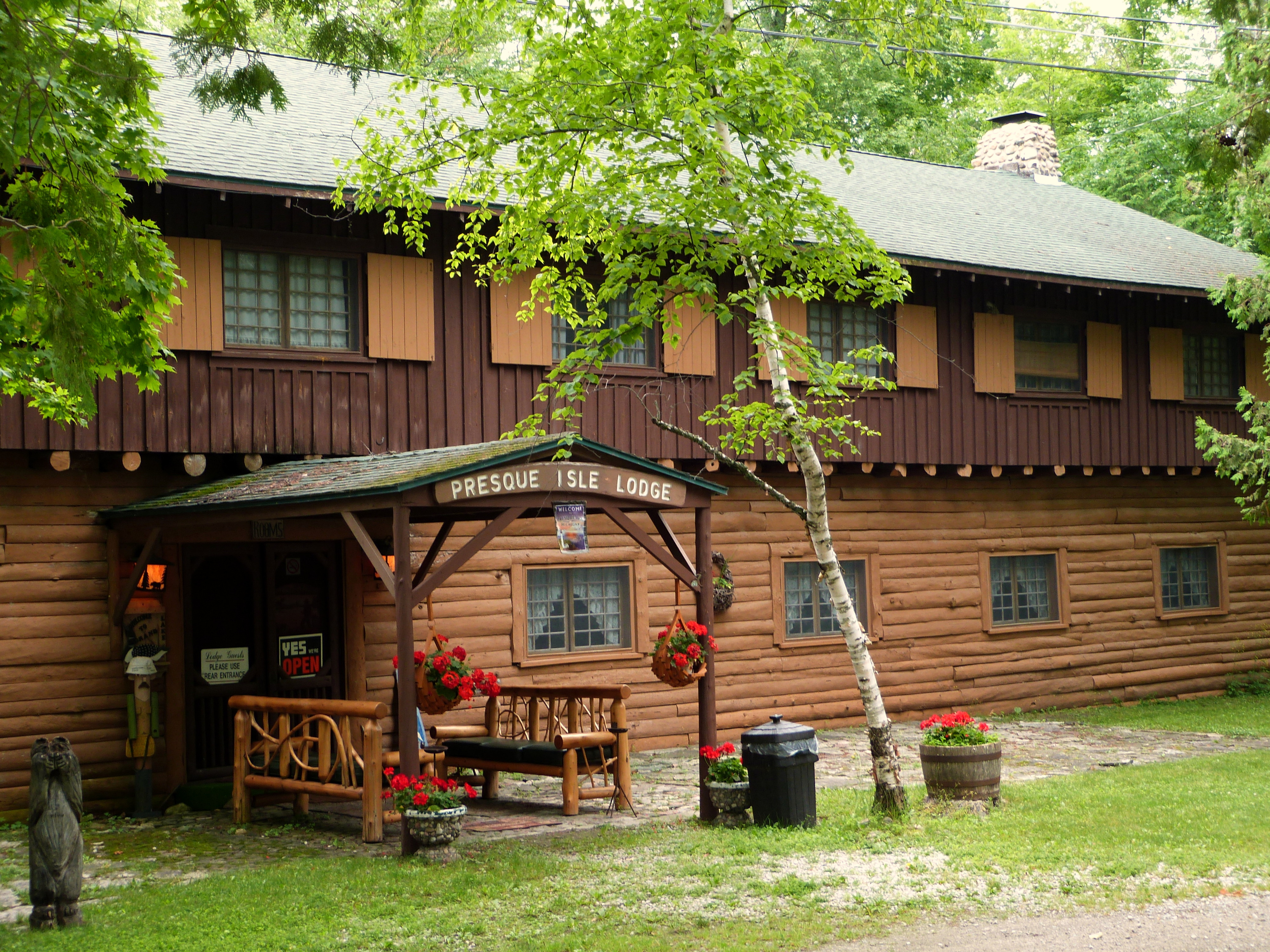

- Location within Michigan Location within the United States
- Interactive map
- Location: 8211 E. Grand Lake Rd. Presque Isle, Michigan
- Coordinates: 45°18′7″N 83°28′37″W
- Area: 4.8 acres (1.9 ha)
- Built: 1920
- Architectural style: Rustic
- NRHP reference No.: 07001490

Significant dates
- Added to NRHP: February 1, 2008
- Designated MSHS: 2012

The Presque Isle Lodge is a rustic hotel located at 8211 East Grand Lake Road in Presque Isle, Michigan. It was listed on the National Register of Historic Places in 2008.

== History ==
In the 1910s, construction began on what is now US-23, opening northern Michigan in general, and this area around Grand Lake specifically, to more tourism. One of the families to take advantage of this was that of Newell A. Eddy, Sr., and his wife, Marianna McRuer Field Eddy. Eddy was a lumberman from the Bay City area, and the couple purchased the land around where the Lodge sits for their personal recreational use. The land was purchased in several transactions over the period 1908–13. Their son Newell A. Eddy Jr. (born in 1880) also used the property.

In about 1920 Eddy Jr. had this lodge constructed on the family's property. Eddy also built the knotty pine furniture within the Lodge, with the help of area craftsmen. After the opening of the Lodge, Eddy established the "Habitant Shops of Presque Isle Lodge," which constructed similar furniture for guests. The shop first operated from the Presque Isle Lodge property, but by 1922 had moved to Bay City.

Newell A. Eddy Jr. died in 1940. His family sold the Lodge in 1944. Milton A. Underwood and his wife, Bessie C. Underwood, purchased it in 1947. They operated the Lodge until Bessie Underwood's death in 1977. Robert G. and Laurie E. Spencer, acquired a partial interest in the Lodge in 1986, and reopened it as a bed and breakfast in 1989. They purchased the remaining interest in 1997. The Lodge continues to operate as a bed and breakfast.

== Description ==
The Presque Isle Lodge is a two-story gable-roof rustic wood-frame structure measuring 150 feet bo 36 feet. The exterior is faced with half-log sidong on the first floor and board-and-batten siding on the second. The main entrance is sheltered under a low gable-roof porch supported by two log front posts. A screened porch is on one end of the building, surrounding a massive fieldstone chimney.

The entryway opens into a lobby with wood flooring and a massive fireplace. Log posts support the second floor, and doors near the fireplace also access the exterior porch. The main floor also houses an office, a small gathering space, bathrooms, and large dining room. The staircase to the second floor is in the center of the lobby. On the second floor, the lodge's visitor rooms are arranged along both sides of a central hall that runs from end to end of the building.

The lodge contains a large collection of the Habitant Shops rustic furniture.
