= Forty Mile Point Light =

Lighthouse in Michigan, United States

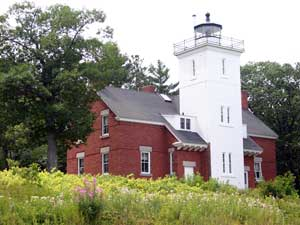
- Forty Mile Point Light
- Location: Rogers Township, Michigan
- Coordinates: 45°29′12″N 83°54′48″W

Tower
- Constructed: 1896
- Foundation: Limestone
- Construction: Brick
- Automated: 1969
- Height: 52 feet (16 m)
- Shape: Square
- Markings: white w/black lantern
- Heritage: National Register of Historic Places listed place, Michigan State Historic Site

Light
- First lit: 1897
- Focal height: 66 feet (20 m)
- Lens: Fourth order Fresnel lens
- Range: 16 nautical miles (30 km; 18 mi)
- Characteristic: white 3 second flash every 6 seconds.
- Forty Mile Point Light
- U.S. National Register of Historic Places
- Michigan State Historic Site
- NRHP reference No.: 84001830
- Added to NRHP: July 19, 1984

Forty Mile Point Light is a lighthouse in Presque Isle County near Hammond Bay on the western shore of Lake Huron in Rogers Township, Michigan USA.

Unlike many Great Lakes lighthouses, Forty Mile Point Light does not mark a significant harbor or river mouth. Rather, it was constructed with the intent that as one sailed from Mackinaw Point to the Saint Clair River, one would never be out of viewing range of a lighthouse. The light is named because it is on 40 mile Point which is 40 miles (64 km) sailing distance from Old Mackinaw Point.

It is part of U.S. Coast Guard District No. 9.

== History ==
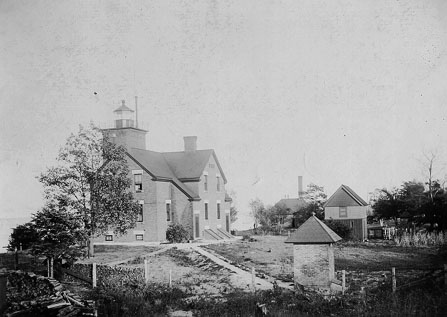
Vintage image of the station

While the Presque Isle Peninsula had been lighted since 1840, and the entrance to the Cheboygan River fifty miles to the north had been lighted since 1851, the New Presque Isle Light's range of visibility of 17 nautical miles; 31 kilometres (19 mi) and the Spectacle Reef Lighthouse, exhibited the light for the first time on June 1, 1874 had a visible range of 16 nautical miles; 29 kilometres (18 mi) left an unlighted 8.7-nautical-mile; 16-kilometre (10 mi) intervening stretch of coastline along which mariners had to navigate blind. In its annual report for the fiscal year 1890, the board recommended that $25,000 be appropriated for the construction of a new light and fog signal at Forty Mile Point near Hammond's Bay, at the approximate midpoint between the two lights.

Congress was unimpressed with the request and it was five years before it was approved and funded. The plan for this light is nearly identical to the one for the 14 Mile Point (Built in 1894 and the Big Bay Point Lighthouse( Built in 1896) both on Lake Superior . The penury of Congress concerning light stations on the Great Lakes was not limited to Forty Mile Point.

The footings are wood pilings, and the structure is 35 by 57 feet (11 m × 17 m) made of red brick, the walls being made with 3 courses of brick, a 2" dead air space and one more course of brick. The integrated tower is 12 feet (3.7 m) square and 52 feet (16 m) high. The house contains two identical apartments (One for the keeper and one for the assistant keeper).

The light was completed in November 1896, but traffic on the Great Lakes is not a year-round event, so it wasn't until the spring (April 1) of 1897 that it was first lit. The station was automated in 1969 and is still operational. Markings are white with a black lantern. The original lens was a fourth order Fresnel lens /freɪˈnɛl/ designed and manufactured by Sauttier And Co. in Paris. It had six bulls-eye flash panels, and the clockwork would rotate it so that it would emit a white flash every ten seconds. This lens was transferred to the new Sand Hills Lighthouse near Eagle River on Lake Superior in 1919 The lens now in place is the second lens to occupy that position. It is a unique lens in that it was made up of parts from at least 3 different lenses. One panel was made by Henry-Lepaute of Paris in 1872. This new lens was a fixed lens with an internal rotating shield mechanism to make a characteristic of 15 seconds on and 15 seconds off. The current characteristic is 3 sec on 3 sec off. This is the last working classic lens on Lake Huron.

== Current operations, maintenance, viewing and events ==
During the Big Blow of 1905, twenty-seven wooden vessels were lost. The steamer Joseph S. Fay ran aground, and a part of its hull rests on the beach approximately 200 feet (61 m) north of the lighthouse. There is a Michigan historical marker honoring Forty Mile Light, there is a marker concerning the "Graveyard of Ships". The marker states:

- Registered Historical Marker Site L2186 was erected 2007 Forty Mile Point Lighthouse / Graveyard of Ships. The Graveyard of Ships marker states:
  - Named by seventeenth century French explorers La Mer Douce the sweet or freshwater sea, Lake Huron is the second largest of the five Great Lakes. It has over 3,800 miles (6,100 km) of shoreline and contains 30,000 islands, among them Manitoulin, the world's largest freshwater island. Violent storms on the "sweet sea" have made it dangerous for ships. As of 2006, 1,200 wrecks had been recorded. During the Big Blow of 1905, twenty-seven wooden vessels were lost. One of these, the steamer Joseph S. Fay, ran aground. A portion of its hull rests on the beach approximately 200 feet north of the Forty Mile Lighthouse. The Great Storm of 1913 was responsible for sinking many modern ships.

The site is now a county park (well-marked) 6 miles (9.7 km) north of Rogers City on US 23, a/k/a the Sunrise Side Coastal Highway. A map with the lights in the area is available at lighthousesRus. The park is accessible from the highway—do not turn on to 40 Mile Point road.

The lighthouse anchors one end of a 7-mile (11 km) bike path, the Huron Sunrise Trail, that is near and sometimes in the right of way along US 23, and runs by Hoeft State Park and to Rogers City. The bike trail was completed in late May 2009.

The lighthouse is owned by Presque Isle County and the museum and gift shop are operated by the 40 Mile Point Lighthouse Society. The park grounds are open to the public year-round from 8.00 AM to sundown. The lighthouse is open for tours from the Friday before Memorial Day through mid October. Tour hours are Tuesday to Sunday 10:00 a.m. to 4:00 p.m. More information may be obtained from the Forty Mile Point Lighthouse Society at (989) 734-4907. or https://fortymilepointlighthouse.org

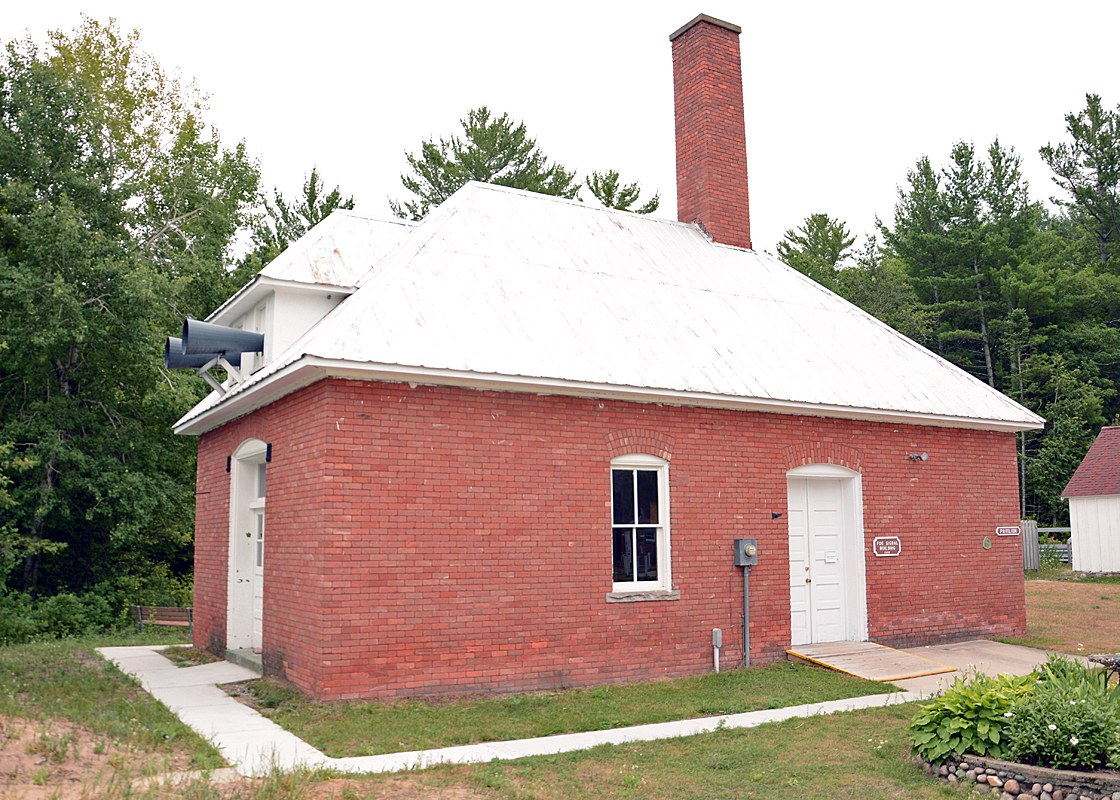
Foghorn signal building

Importantly, the many structures that were part of the installation remain: lighthouse; Lighthouse keeper quarters; barn (bunkhouse)(renovated in 2006-2007 as the gift shop), foghorn signal building (the diaphone has been removed), oil house, and brick outhouse. The surrounding park also houses the wheelhouse of the first Calcite freighter.

The fourth order Fresnel lens is in place and in use, and access to the tower provides a view of it and the Lakeshore. The Fresnel lens is still operative, being one of only 70 such lenses that remain operational in the United States, less than sixteen of which are use on the Great Lakes of which less than eight are in Michigan.

There are many recurrent events at the lighthouse. A calendar is available. Half of the lighthouse is now a museum, the other half is caretaker's quarters. Membership of the 40-Mile Point Lighthouse Society is $20.00 per year.

== Access ==
- U.S. Route 23
- Huron Sunrise Trail

== See also ==
- Lighthouses in the United States
