= Presque Isle Harbor, Michigan =

- Census-designated place (CDP) & unincorporated community
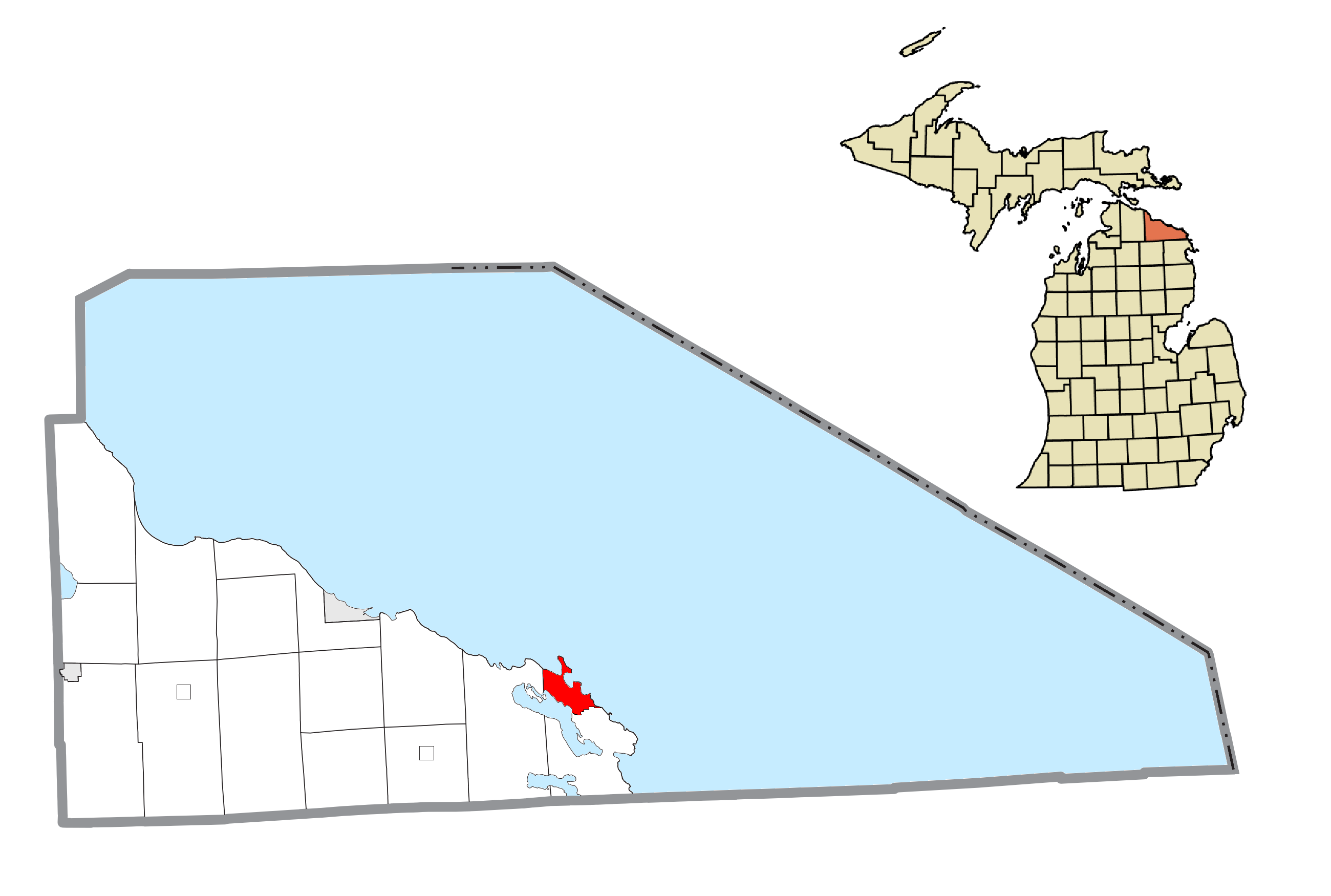
- Location within Presque Isle County

- Location within the state of Michigan Presque Isle Harbor (the United States)
- Coordinates: 45°19′21″N 83°29′06″W
- Country: United States
- State: Michigan
- County: Presque Isle
- Township: Presque Isle

Area
  - Total: 7.00 sq mi (18.12 km^{2})
  - Land: 6.37 sq mi (16.51 km^{2})
  - Water: 0.62 sq mi (1.61 km^{2})
- Elevation: 620 ft (190 m)

Population (2020)
  - Total: 643
  - Density: 100.9/sq mi (38.95/km^{2})
- Time zone: UTC-5 (Eastern (EST))
  - Summer (DST): UTC-4 (EDT)
- ZIP code(s): 49777 (Presque Isle)
- Area code: 989
- GNIS feature ID: 2583762

Presque Isle Harbor is an unincorporated community and census-designated place (CDP) in Presque Isle County in the U.S. state of Michigan. As of the 2020 census, Presque Isle Harbor had a population of 643. The CDP is located along the shores of Lake Huron within Presque Isle Township.

== History ==
The community of Presque Isle Harbor was listed as a newly organized census-designated place for the 2010 census, meaning it now has officially defined boundaries and population statistics for the first time.

== Geography ==
According to the United States Census Bureau, the community has an area of 6.87 square miles (17.79 km^{2}), of which 6.25 square miles (16.19 km^{2}) is land and 0.62 square miles (1.61 km^{2}) (9.02%) is water.

== Demographics ==
As of the 2023 census from the ACS, Presque Isle Harbor has a population of 722, from which 100% are citizens, with the median age of 65.8. The largest ethnic group in Presque Isle Harbor are white (99.4%), with the rest of the population being mixed (0.554%).

Out of 722 people, 219 people in Presque Isle Harbor were employed. The largest form of business in this community is the finance industry, with 41 people working at that sector, and the highest paying industry is in the construction sector.

Historical population
Census	Pop.	Note	%±
2020	643		—
U.S. Decennial Census
