= Grand Lake (Michigan) =

Lake in the state of Michigan, United States

- Location within Michigan Location within the United States
- Location: Presque Isle County, Michigan
- Coordinates: 45°18.14′N 83°29.76′W
- Type: spring fed
- Basin countries: United States
- Max. length: 7 mi (11 km)
- Max. width: 1.5 mi (2.4 km)
- Surface area: 5,660 acres (22.9 km^{2})
- Surface elevation: 594 feet (181 m)

Grand Lake is a 5,660-acre (22.9 km^{2}) spring fed lake in Presque Isle County in the U.S. state of Michigan. Grand Lake is a substantial lake of approximately 7 miles (11 km) in length and up to 1.5 miles (2.4 km) in width. The lake is on the boundary between Presque Isle Township to the east and Krakow Township to the west, approximately 15 miles (24 km) north of Alpena on U.S. Highway 23, which passes to the south and west of the lake.

Fishing species include: bluegill, bullhead catfish, northern pike, garpike, bowfin, pumpkinseed sunfish, rock bass, smallmouth bass, white sucker, yellow perch, and walleye.

The lake lies on the landward side of a prominent promontory in the county that juts out into Lake Huron, thereby making the promontory almost an island and indirectly giving the promontory and county their name of "Presque Isle." The lake contains many islands, such as Brown Island, Grand Island, and Macombers Island.

The two Presque Isle, Michigan lighthouses are nearby to the east: the New Presque Isle Lighthouse at 4500 E. Grand Lake Road and the Old Presque Isle Lighthouse at 5295 Grand Lake Road.

Deposits of Rock salt were discovered at a depth of 1284 feet in the vicinity of Grand Lake. On the west shore of the lake are ledges, which rise to a height of 40 feet above lake level, and include Cerepatora fossils along with crinoid stems.

== See also ==
- List of lakes in Michigan
