= Ocqueoc Outdoor Center =

- Camp Black Lake
- U.S. National Register of Historic Places
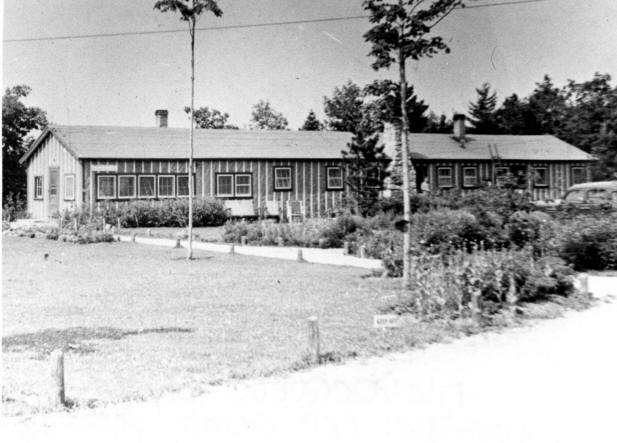

- Location within Michigan Location within the United States
- Interactive map
- Location: 7142 Ocqueoc Lake Rd., Ocqueoc Township
- Coordinates: 45°28′52″N 84°6′45″W
- Area: 17 acres (6.9 ha)
- Built: 1933
- NRHP reference No.: 100006365
- Added to NRHP: April 6, 2021

Ocqueoc Outdoor Center, formerly known as Camp Black Lake, is a former Civilian Conservation Corps located at 7142 Ocqueoc Lake Road in Ocqueoc Township, Michigan. It is now used as a youth and adult outdoor education center. The site is significant as one of only two surviving CCC camps in Lower Michigan, out of the 122 different original camp locations across Michigan. It was listed on the National Register of Historic Places in 2021.

== History ==
The state of Michigan began setting aside land for state forests in the 1920s. In 1928, the Black Lake State Forest was created in Presque Isle County. When Franklin Roosevelt started his New Deal programs, the area became an ideal place to begin some of the New Deal conservation programs. Camp Black Lake was built in 1933 as part of the Emergency Conservation Work (late renamed the Civilian Conservation Corps) program. The camp was used to house unemployed middle-aged veterans of the Spanish American War and WWI. These were replaced by younger men in 1936, but veterans returned the next year. The camp was active year-round until the CCC was disbanded in 1941.

After World War II, most of the buildings at Camp Black Lake were repurposed as a youth outdoor recreation and education center. The State of Michigan owned the CCC buildings and the surrounding state forest, but leased the site to Michigan State University Extension for 4-H camping groups, and later to the Michigan United Conservation Clubs for similar purposes. The MUCC terminated their lease in 2002, and the camp buildings were to be demolished. However, objections from residents and local government officials in Presque Isle County led the state to transfer the buildings and grounds to Presque Isle County in 2004. The county continues to own and operate the site as a youth and adult outdoor education, recreation, and event venue.

== Description ==
Camp Black Lake consists of eight buildings: two barracks, a wash house (originally a third barracks), mess hall, administrative headquarters, hospital, garage and oil storage building. Two additional buildings located on the site, a frame and a log classroom, were constructed later. The buildings sit on a 17-acre site on Ocqueoc Lake. All of the original buildings are modular, intended to be erected quickly by inexperienced workers. The barracks, washhouse, mess hall and headquarters modules are located in a cluster. They were all constructed using wood framing members and sheathing, tarpaper and wood batten siding and rolled asphalt roofing. The tarpaper and wood batten siding has been replaced with cement shingle siding. The original camp hospital is a small residential structure located overlooking Ocqueoc Lake. A masonry oil storage building and a wood garage are located along the entry drive.
