= Great Lakes Lore Maritime Museum =

Museum in Rogers City, Michigan, United States

The Great Lakes Lore Maritime Museum is a museum located in Rogers City in the U.S. state of Michigan. The museum is located in a noted Lake Huron port city, and the museum specializes in the maritime history of the Great Lakes with an emphasis on the lives of marine personnel.

== Description ==
The Great Lakes Lore Maritime Museum remembers many of the seafarers and seamen of the Great Lakes. Rogers City is a noted producer of aggregate. A thick stratum of limestone is quarried nearby and shipped all over the U.S. Midwest for construction purposes and to serve as flux in the steelmaking process. Many youngsters from Rogers City have "shipped out" over the years. Some have returned as retirees to help staff the museum, and others have been lost and are memorialized here.

A boat of particular importance to the history of maritime Rogers City is the SS Carl D. Bradley, once the largest vessel carrying bulk freight on the Great Lakes. The Bradley, caught in a severe storm off Gull Island in Lake Michigan while returning to her home port in ballast, broke apart and foundered on the night of November 18, 1958. Only two men survived, while 33 were lost. Of the men killed, 23 were from Rogers City. The museum contains displays in honor of the lost vessel.

The museum is located at 367 North 3rd Street, Rogers City, Michigan 49779.

== See also ==
- List of maritime museums in the United States
