= Presque Isle County Courthouse =

- U.S. National Register of Historic Places
- Michigan State Historic Site
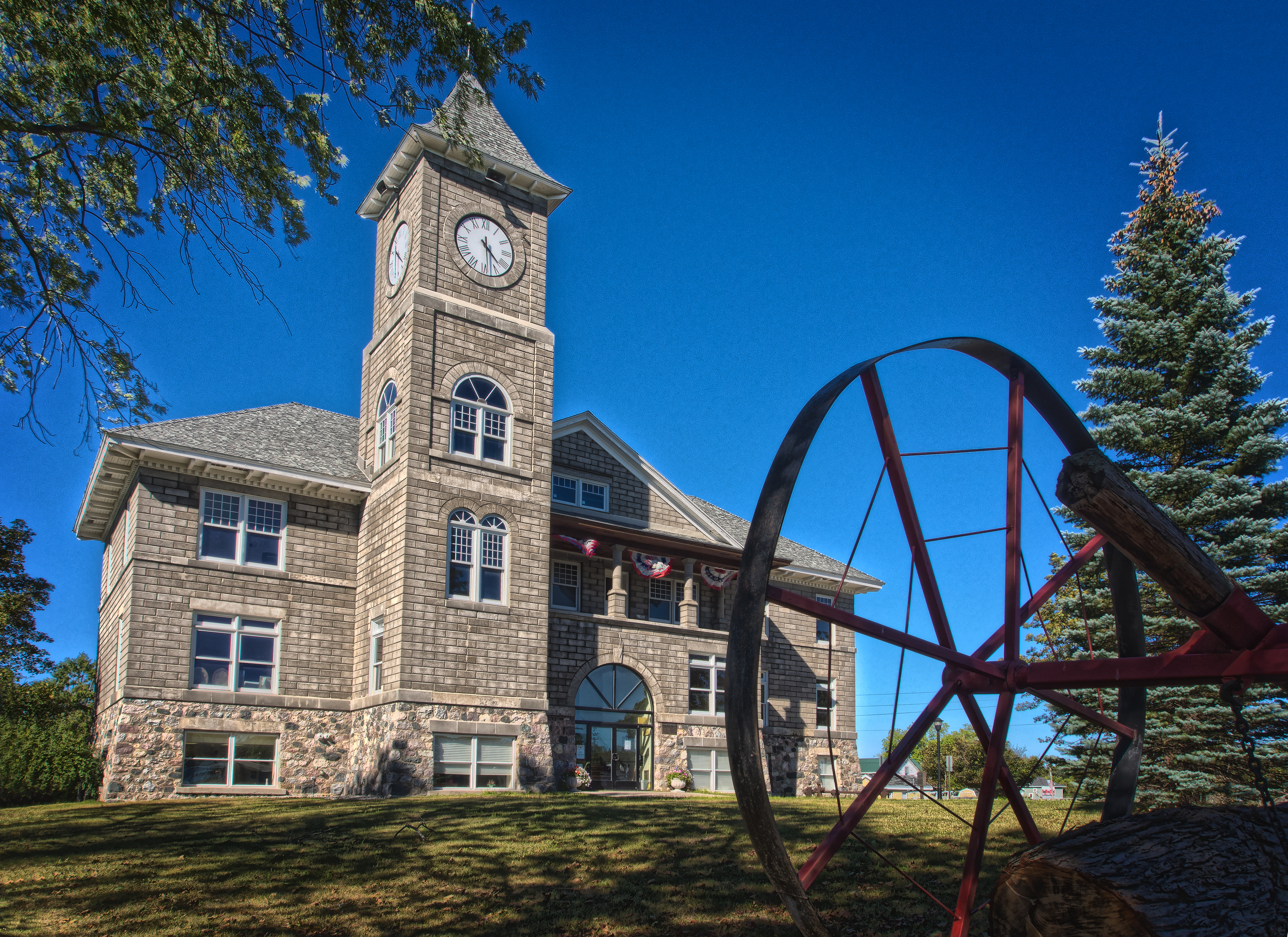

- Location within Michigan Location within the United States
- Interactive map showing the location for Presque Isle County Courthouse
- Location: State and Maple Sts., Onaway, Michigan
- Coordinates: 45°21′28″N 84°13′47″W
- Area: 4 acres (1.6 ha)
- Built: 1908
- Architectural style: Late Victorian, Eclectic
- NRHP reference No.: 80001889

Significant dates
- Added to NRHP: April 3, 1980
- Designated MSHS: May 17, 1978

The Presque Isle County Courthouse, also known as the Onaway Courthouse, is a government building located on the corner of State and Maple Streets in Onaway, Michigan. It was designated a Michigan State Historic Site in 1978 and listed on the National Register of Historic Places in 1980.

== History ==
Merritt Chandler was born in 1843 near Adrian, Michigan. He made a fortune in lumbering and then in building roads; in 1886 he platted the village of Onaway. By 1903, Onaway had a population of 3000, making it the largest settlement in Presque Isle County. In 1908, Chandler constructed this building and donated it to the county in an effort to wrest the county seat away from Rogers City. He was unable to have the county seat moved, so in 1911 a drive started to carve out a new county for Onaway, to be called "Forest County." The drive failed, but as a compromise, county court sessions were alternated between Rogers City and Onaway until the 1940s.

The building served various functions over the years, but began to fall into disrepair. In the late 1990s, restoration efforts began, and over $1 million was spent to improve the heating and electrical system, replace the roof and windows, refinish the interior, and install a clock in the clocktower.

As of 2009, the building houses the Onaway Branch of the Presque Isle District Library, the Onaway Historical Museum, the Chamber of Commerce, and offices of the City of Onaway.

== Description ==
The Presque Isle County Courthouse is a two-story asymmetric structure built of poured concrete block building on a fieldstone foundation. Its Eclectic design incorporates Italian Villa, Romanesque, and Renaissance Revival styles. It has a low-pitched hip roof with overhanging eaves supported by bracketry, and a square off-center tower.
