= New Presque Isle Light =

Lighthouse in Michigan, United States

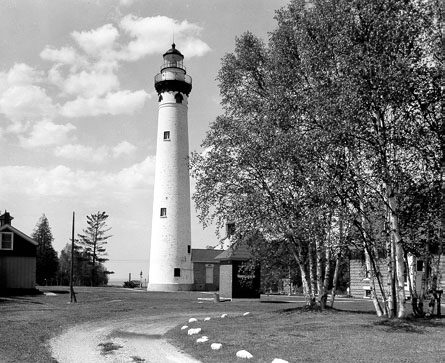
- New Presque Isle Light; Source: U.S. Coast Guard Archives
- Location: 4500 Grand Lake Road; Presque Isle County
- Coordinates: 45°21′23.5″N 83°29′32.4″W

Tower
- Constructed: 1870
- Construction: brick, Italianate bracketing
- Automated: 1970
- Height: 113 ft (34 m)
- Shape: Conical
- Markings: white w/dwelling attached
- Heritage: National Register of Historic Places listed place, Michigan State Historic Site

Light
- First lit: 1870
- Focal height: 123 ft (37 m)
- Lens: Third order Fresnel lens (original), Airport beacon (current)
- Range: 22 nmi (41 km; 25 mi)
- Characteristic: Fl W 15s
- New Presque Isle Light
- U.S. National Register of Historic Places
- Michigan State Historic Site
- NRHP reference No.: 83000890

Significant dates
- Added to NRHP: August 4, 1983
- Designated MSHS: June 30, 1988

The New Presque Isle Light was built in 1870, at Presque Isle, Michigan, east of Grand Lake, and sits on the namesake peninsula. It is one of 149 lighthouses in Michigan, more than any other state. Because of changing shoreline particularly, or alternatively deterioration of the original building, it is not uncommon for a replacement lighthouse to be placed in the vicinity of an earlier light, in this case, the Old Presque Isle Light.

== History ==
It was U.S. Army Corps of Engineers Major Orlando M. Poe who designed the plans for the new lighthouse, and proposed the total construction cost to be 21,000 dollars more than what was previously appropriated; the amount proposed was relatively modest, given the then astounding figures he would expend on building the Spectacle Reef Light. (Poe was also the chief engineer on General William Tecumseh Sherman's famous “March to the Sea” during the Civil War.) When he received enough funding, he gathered construction materials, obtained bids for labor, and organized a working crew.

The tender Warrington brought the working party and materials to the harbor in the summer of 1870. A lighthouse tender was a smaller ship that would take care of its supported lights. They would come to service the station, keeping it stocked with food, supplies, and construction materials. Work was completed in early summer of 1871. The base was 10 ft (3.0 m) below the ground, with the base of nineteen feet tapering off to 12 ft (3.7 m) right below the gallery. The new tower was built with double walls. Though the winds and the waves here at Presque Isle would not be nearly as rough as they could be at more remote locations like Stannard's Rock, the walls would still stand strong against any harsh weather Lake Huron could deliver. A spiral cast iron stairway led the Lighthouse keeper 138 steps to the top gallery. This plan was so unique and elegant that it inspired several other lighthouses around the Great Lakes to copy its design. (Outer Island and Au Sable Point on Lake Superior, and Big Sable Point Light and Grosse Point Light on Lake Michigan were recreated using a similar structure.)

A sixteen-foot covered passageway connected the tower to the two story keeper's dwelling, allowing for extra protection when the keepers would go to the tower in harsh weather. A full cellar was built under the house, and here the keepers would store personal items as well as oil for the lamp.

== Fresnel lens ==
A third-order Fresnel lens, which stood six feet in height—manufactured by Henry LePaute Cie. of Paris—was used for the lamp. This lens was invented by a Frenchman of the same name, and it quickly became popular in towers across the country. Its strong, efficient lens was able to cast light much farther than previous techniques: open flame, light fueled by whale oil, or small wicks. The Fresnel lens system was a great improvement over previous lenses in lighthouses, but it was not until the 1850s that it was commonly adopted in the United States and on the Great Lakes. The lens allowed only a small amount of light to “escape” – that is, disperse and not shine directly to the water and incoming vessels. Fresnel was able to do this by creating various concentric rings surrounding the lens that would bend the light, ultimately focusing it in one direction. A very intense light could thus be seen by boats on the Lakes several miles away. This advantage would be very valuable for the lake freighters or passenger steamers lost in a storm or dangerous weather that is prone to occur on the Lakes.

It also had advantage over a previous system of lenses – the Lewis system. With this system, designed by a former sea captain named Winslow Lewis, a parabolic reflector directed light emitted from a hollow-tube wick. This wick was intensified by a draft of air that would flow over it, creating the light of six or seven candles. Even with the reflectors, the lens still could not produce nearly as much light as the Fresnel lens system. Furthermore, it was difficult to clean and maintain, resulting in constant repair, adjustment, and other maintenance. Clearly, the Fresnel lens system was the optimum choice for the Lighthouse Service and for the Presque Isle Harbor lighthouse.

The light at Presque Isle was not installed with any sort of flashing system, though the option was left available. Often, boats are able to distinguish between two different lights by a Flashing beacon. Either the beacon itself would rotate, and thus illuminate 360° around the lighthouse, or a blinder with only a small portion unshielded would rotate around the lamp, exposing the bright light for only a few seconds. The rotation was controlled by heavy weights that would slowly sink due to gravity. Every few hours the lightkeeper would “wind up” the rotating beacon or blinder. However, Presque Isle's light was a steady beacon.

== Lightkeepers ==
It was Patrick Garraty, selected by Abraham Lincoln as fourth keeper of the old lighthouse, who was also instated as first keeper of the new lighthouse. His wife Mary was appointed by Patrick as assistant keeper. Later, in 1886, his 18-year-old son Thomas took the position, and he tended the light until 1935.

The lighthouse keeper's duty was never-ending. The station was expected to remain neat and orderly, and the lens required a daily cleaning, every two months a wash, and yearly a special polish. Wicks needed to be trimmed daily. Light towers were expected to remain in top shape, and this required sweeping, snow shoveling, and other care. This was to be done before 10 am, in preparation for that night's use. Additionally, many lightkeepers also maintained a garden on the property which would sustain them with enough fresh vegetables when tenders would not come.

The Lighthouse Board would routinely send inspectors to insure the lights, towers, and stations were kept up. Ideally, their arrival would be unannounced, but the installation of telephone in the various stations around the lakes gave keepers a way to warn others that they would soon be visited. In last minute scrambles, the lenses were tidied, the stations were cleaned, and the keeper and family put on cleaner clothes to help promote a more professional appearance at the station. These inspections were not treated lightly.

== Upgrades ==
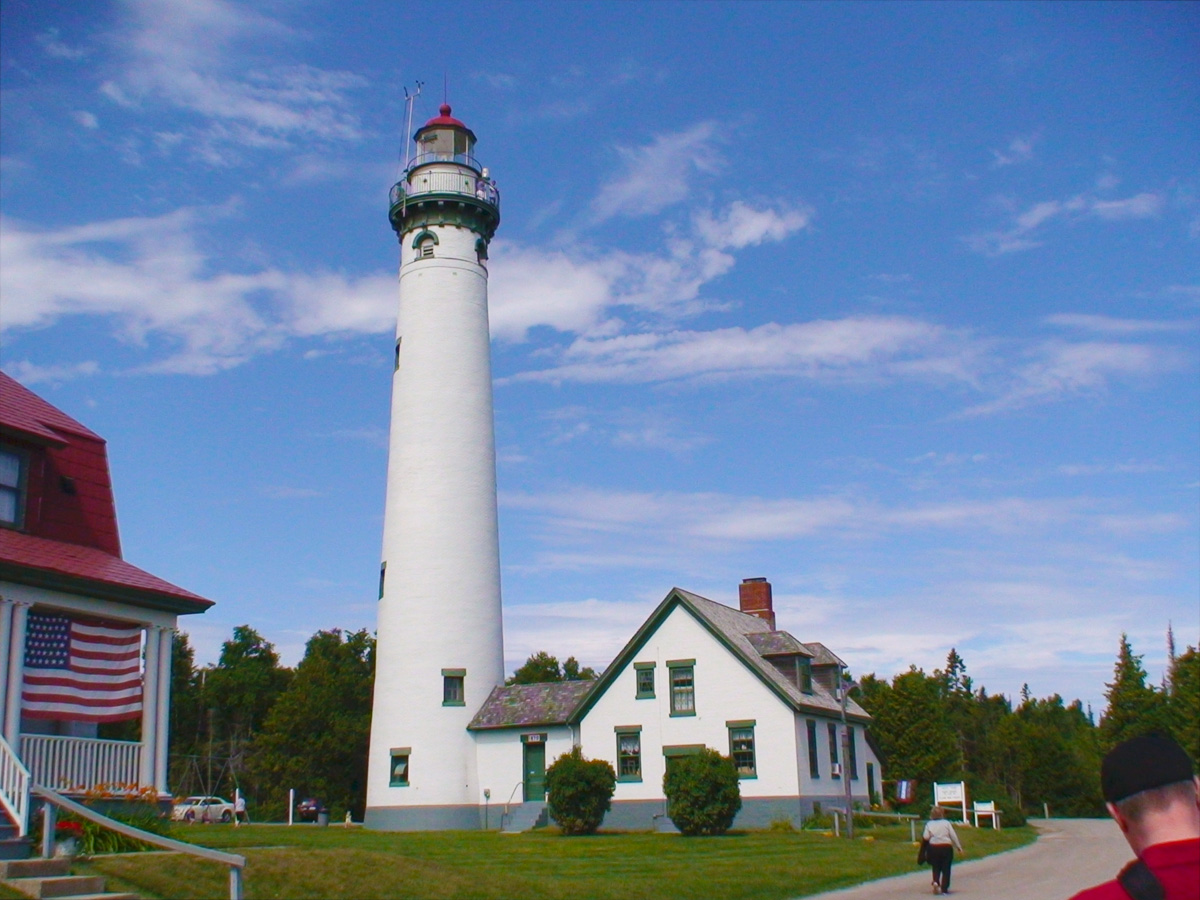

As times progressed and bigger ships and freighters utilized the Presque Isle Harbor, more developments and construction were made. In March 1889, Congress gave another 5,500 dollars to the construction of a steam fog signal at the station. These loud horns were helpful in fog or stormy weather when a vessel had little or no visibility. These signals, though sometimes distorted by the fog itself, could be heard where the light could not be seen. A problem, however, with the steam was the preparation to sound the signal. Sometimes it took as long as 45 minutes to start a boiler fire and wait for the steam pressure to rise. This could pose a hazard to a boat that required immediate assistance from keepers at the station – in those precious minutes, a vessel might be severely delayed upon entering harbor. In time, compressed air was substituted for the steam operation, and this significantly decreased the amount of time needed to prepare for blasting the signal.

In June 1890, the steam barge Ruby arrived at Presque Isle harbor with a working crew. They brought with them the materials to construct the building as well as a 2,240 ft (680 m)-long tramway which would serve as the track for the transportation of tons of coal that fueled the fog signal boilers, as well as oil and other supplies from the dock. (The working crew also rebuilt the landing dock and boat house.) In 1897, due to receding lake levels, the landing dock was extended 120 ft (37 m).

Feeding the fog signal boilers was an arduous task. Dependably performing these jobs daily, among others, often required more than one keeper and one assistant. Eleventh District Inspector Commander Edward H Gheen reported that the Presque Isle Light needed more than two men running the station. Plans for a second dwelling on the property were drawn, and Congress allotted 5,000 dollars to build it. Work arrived on the tender Amaranth, and the new dwelling was constructed and finished by September 1905. The outer crib of the boat landing and a new deck were also built during this time. But for four years, no second assistant keeper was assigned to Presque Isle. In November 1909, Arthur J. Cater came to fill the position.

In September 1912, an incandescent oil vapor system was installed at the light tower. This new system was able to decrease the amount of cleaning needed while increasing the temperature and burn intensity. Kerosene was forced into a heated chamber where it was vaporized. It was then sent into the mantle where it would burn very brightly. (This highly effective and very efficient type of system is similar to what is used in smaller Coleman lanterns carried by campers today.

The Lighthouse Service was transferred to control under the Coast Guard in 1939, and that department gained control of the Presque Isle light. Indoor plumbing and electricity were installed at the station, and the fog signal building was demolished because it was no longer a necessity. The Coast Guard automated the light in 1970, and boarded up the station building.

== Recent developments ==
In the 1990s this lighthouse was given an additional course of brick. Thus, its girth is wider and the light does not look as 'trim' as it once did in old photographs.

The property was leased to the county as Presque Isle Park, and eventually they were given full control of it in 1998. With its beacon visible for 22 nmi (41 km; 25 mi) out in the water, the Presque Isle Lighthouse is today known as one of the highest towers on the Great Lakes.

This light is listed on the National Register of Historic Places, Name of Listing: NEW PRESQUE ISLE LIGHTHOUSE/REF #83000890.

== See also ==
- Lighthouses in the United States
