= Old Presque Isle Light =

Lighthouse in Michigan, United States

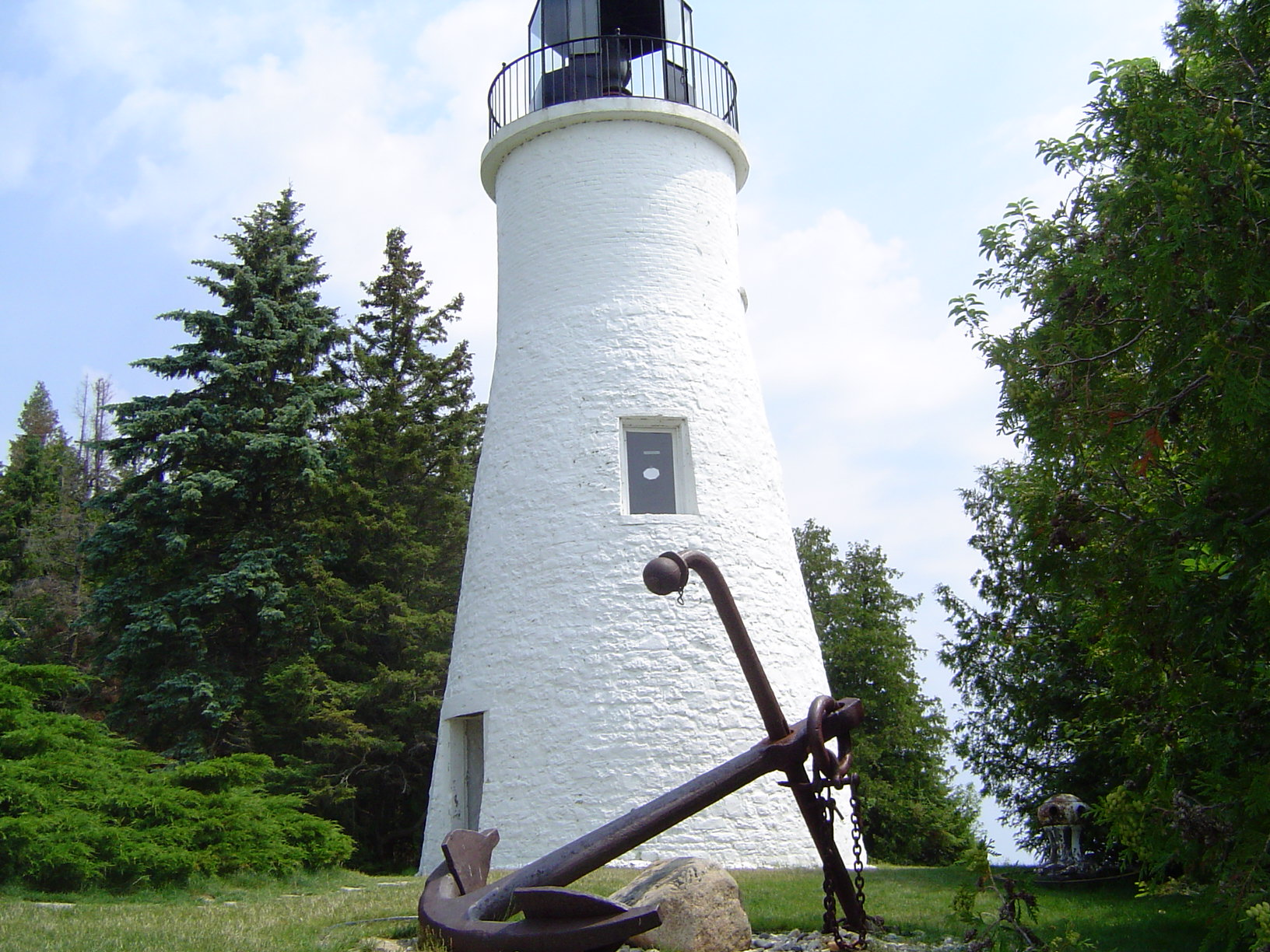
- Location: Presque Isle, Michigan
- Coordinates: 45°20′31.3″N 83°28′41.8″W

Tower
- Constructed: 1840
- Foundation: dressed stone/timber
- Construction: lower 2/3 stone, upper brick
- Height: 38 feet (12 m)
- Shape: conical, separate building
- Markings: white/black lantern & parapet
- Heritage: National Register of Historic Places listed place, Michigan State Historic Site
- Fog signal: Bell

Light
- First lit: 1840
- Deactivated: 1871
- Focal height: 36 feet (11 m)
- Lens: none
- Old Presque Isle Light
- U.S. National Register of Historic Places
- Michigan State Historic Site
- NRHP reference No.: 73000957

Significant dates
- Added to NRHP: April 11, 1973
- Designated MSHS: October 14, 1964

The Old Presque Isle Light was the first lighthouse in the Presque Isle, Michigan, area, built in 1840, supported physically by two-thirds stone and one-third brick, and supported financially by funds appropriated by Congress two years earlier of $5,000. The tower and dwelling did not last long in the harsh weather, however, and by 1867 they were deteriorated enough for Congress to find need for a newer station. It presently is not operational and is a museum.

== History ==
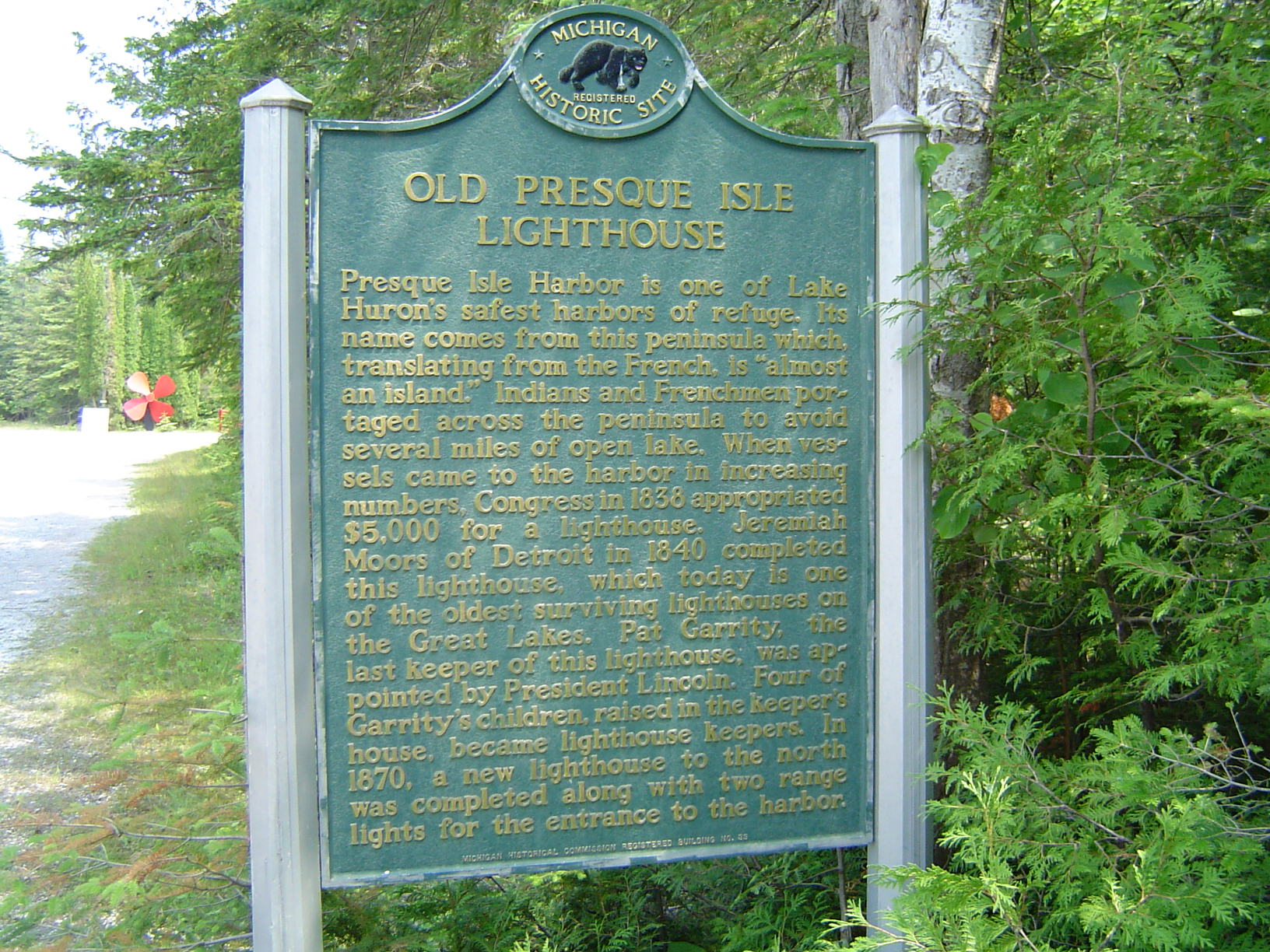
Historical Marker of Old Presque Isle Lighthouse

This old one, though, has not been completely dismissed, at least by the superstitious. Lake legend says the station still provides a residence for ghosts who haunt the light. The ghost of George Parris, a former museum caretaker who is now deceased is said to haunt the light. Though the light has long since been deactivated, the tale says that Parris returns habitually to light the lamp.

Other accounts of Parris include a young girl who was exploring the tower alone. When she returned, she had told her parents that she was talking to a "nice old man" in the tower's lamp room. It was later found that nobody else had been in the tower at that time. The girl correctly identified the man as former keeper George Parris from a photo kept in the adjoining cottage/museum.

One day, Parris' widowed wife was going out to run an errand during an intense lightning storm. She was about to leave the cottage, but she claimed that some unusual force was blocking the exit. Just then lightning struck directly outside the cottage. To this day, Mrs. Parris believes that it was the spirit of her deceased husband that kept her from certain electrocution.

The New Presque Isle Lighthouse located a few miles north, also has its share of hauntings. One keeper's wife, who was locked up and not allowed to leave, suffered from the severe isolation and went insane. Many claim to hear her when visiting the site.

The Lighthouse Board – that service responsible for building and maintaining lights most effectively – decided to move the lighthouse location about 2 miles (3.2 km) north, where vessels which were farther from shore could still easily see the light. The tower was also designed to be 113 feet (34 m) in height, more than 80 feet (24 m) taller than the older one. Congress appropriated 7,000 dollars to make this possible in March 1867, and the New Presque Isle Lighthouse was soon erected.

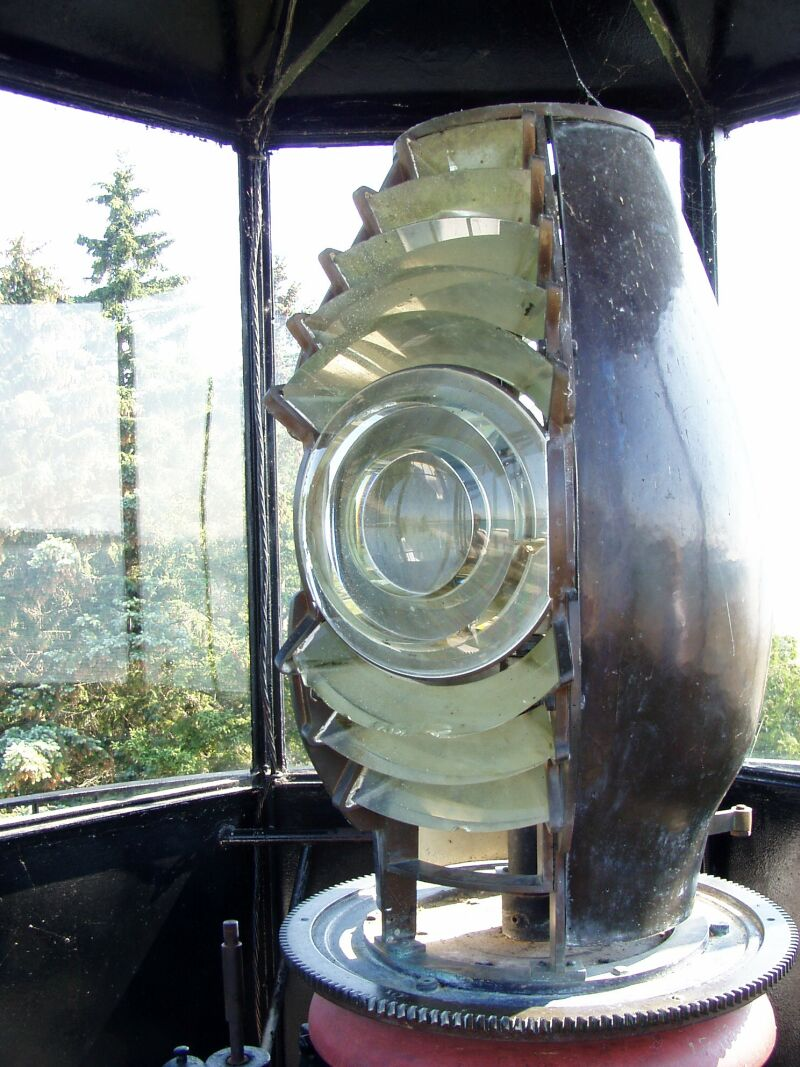
Fresnel Lens from the Old Presque Isle Light

This lighthouse and its sister, the New Presque Isle Light, are east of Grand Lake (Presque Ile, Michigan), and sit on the peninsula.

This light is listed on the National Register of Historic Places, Reference #73000957 Name of Listing: OLD PRESQUE ISLE LIGHTHOUSE.

A Fresnel lens that was associated with this light was donated and is now on display at the Beaver Island Head Light.

== See also ==
- Lighthouses in the United States
