= Rogers Township, Michigan =

- Civil township
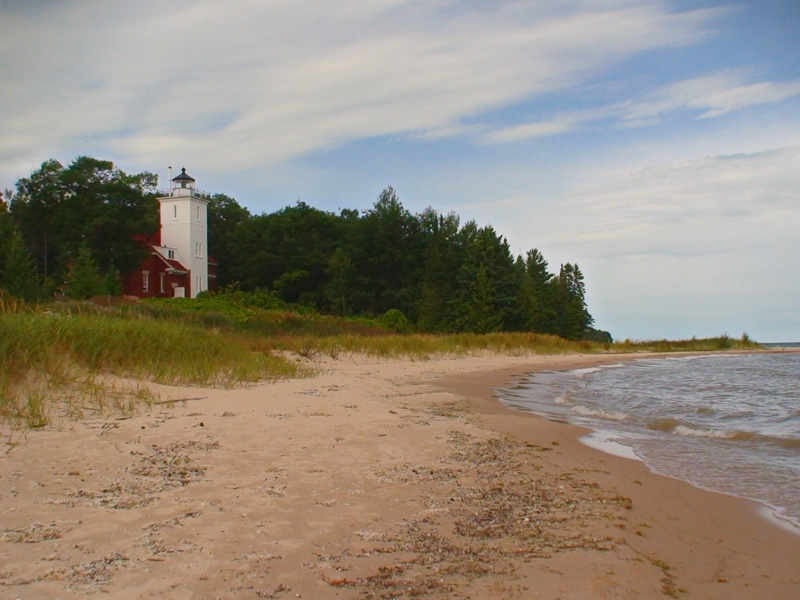
- Forty Mile Point Light along the shores of Lake Huron within Rogers Township

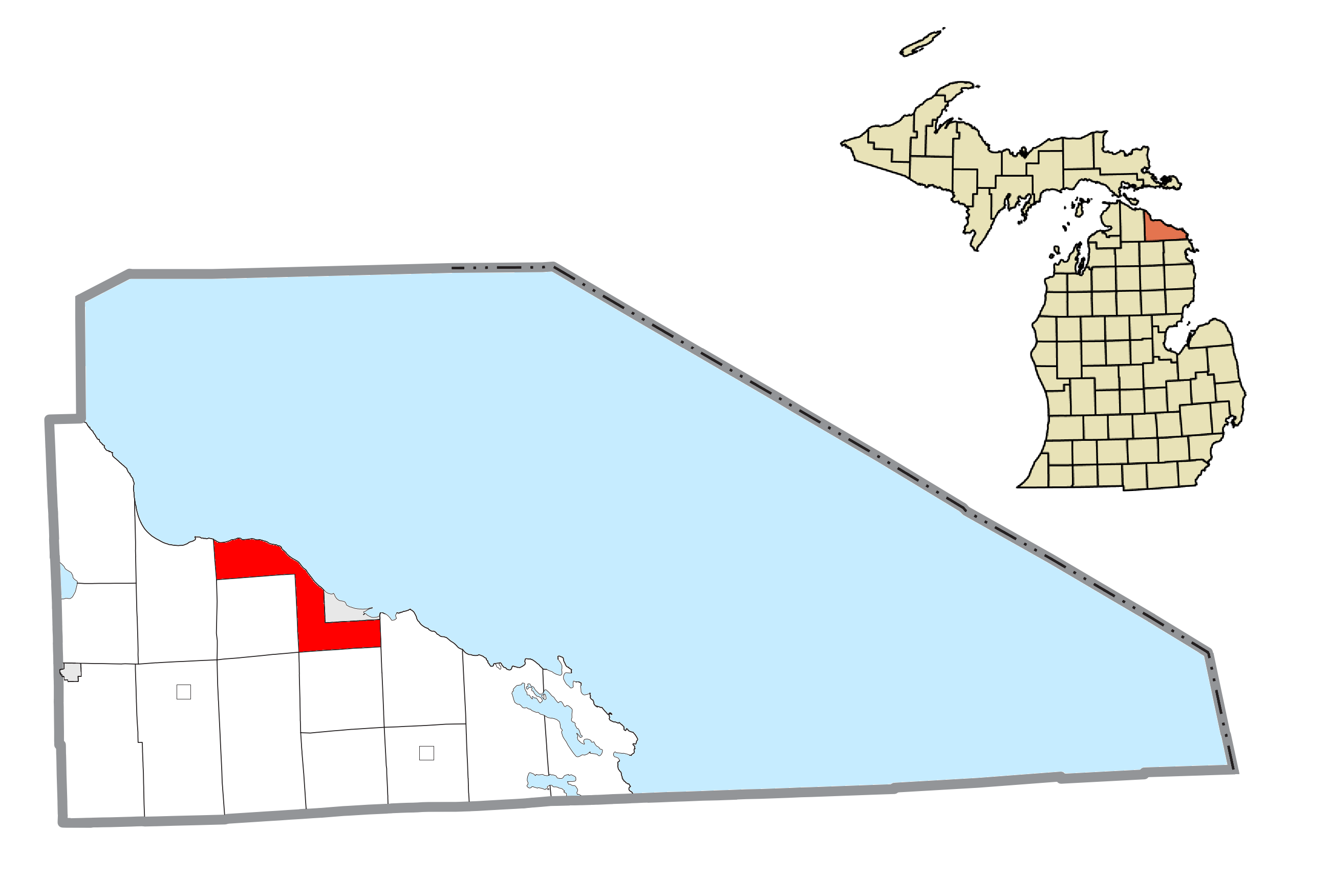
- Location within Presque Isle County

- Location within the state of Michigan Rogers Township (the United States)
- Coordinates: 45°25′10″N 83°51′15″W
- Country: United States
- State: Michigan
- County: Presque Isle

Area
  - Total: 33.6 sq mi (87.1 km^{2})
  - Land: 33.6 sq mi (87.0 km^{2})
  - Water: 0.077 sq mi (0.2 km^{2})
- Elevation: 660 ft (200 m)

Population (2020)
  - Total: 964
  - Density: 28.7/sq mi (11.1/km^{2})
- Time zone: UTC-5 (Eastern (EST))
  - Summer (DST): UTC-4 (EDT)
- ZIP code(s): 49779
- Area code: 989
- FIPS code: 26-69240
- GNIS feature ID: 1626995

Rogers Township is a civil township of Presque Isle County in the U.S. state of Michigan. The population was 964 at the 2020 census. Rogers City is mostly surrounded by the township but is administratively autonomous.

== Communities ==
Manitou Beach is a small unincorporated community within the township.

== Geography ==
According to the United States Census Bureau, the township has a total area of 33.7 square miles (87 km^{2}), of which 33.6 square miles (87 km^{2}) is land and 0.1 square miles (0.26 km^{2}) (0.18%) is water.

== Demographics ==
As of the census of 2000, there were 949 people, 391 households, and 294 families residing in the township. The population density was 28.3 inhabitants per square mile (10.9/km^{2}). There were 597 housing units at an average density of 17.8 per square mile (6.9/km^{2}). The racial makeup of the township was 97.68% White, 0.63% African American, 0.32% Native American, 0.11% from other races, and 1.26% from two or more races. Hispanic or Latino of any race were 0.53% of the population.

There were 391 households, out of which 23.0% had children under the age of 18 living with them, 71.4% were married couples living together, 2.6% had a female householder with no husband present, and 24.8% were non-families. 22.0% of all households were made up of individuals, and 9.2% had someone living alone who was 65 years of age or older. The average household size was 2.42 and the average family size was 2.79.

In the township the population was spread out, with 19.3% under the age of 18, 6.3% from 18 to 24, 19.6% from 25 to 44, 35.0% from 45 to 64, and 19.8% who were 65 years of age or older. The median age was 48 years. For every 100 females, there were 99.4 males. For every 100 females age 18 and over, there were 99.5 males.

The median income for a household in the township was $39,205, and the median income for a family was $42,734. Males had a median income of $33,250 versus $21,719 for females. The per capita income for the township was $18,157. About 5.4% of families and 9.5% of the population were below the poverty line, including 19.0% of those under age 18 and 4.8% of those age 65 or over.
