= Presque Isle Township, Michigan =

- Civil township
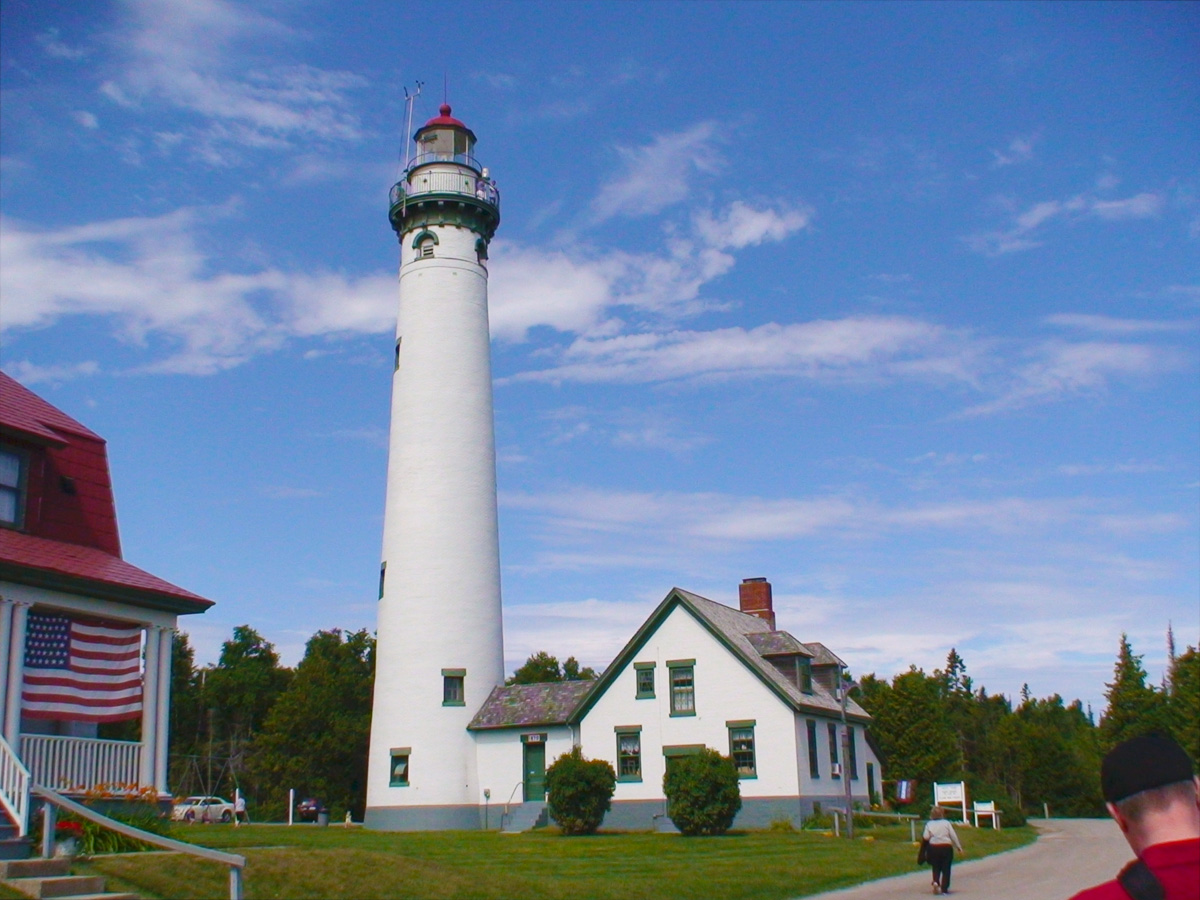
- New Presque Isle Light along the shores of Lake Huron within Presque Isle Township

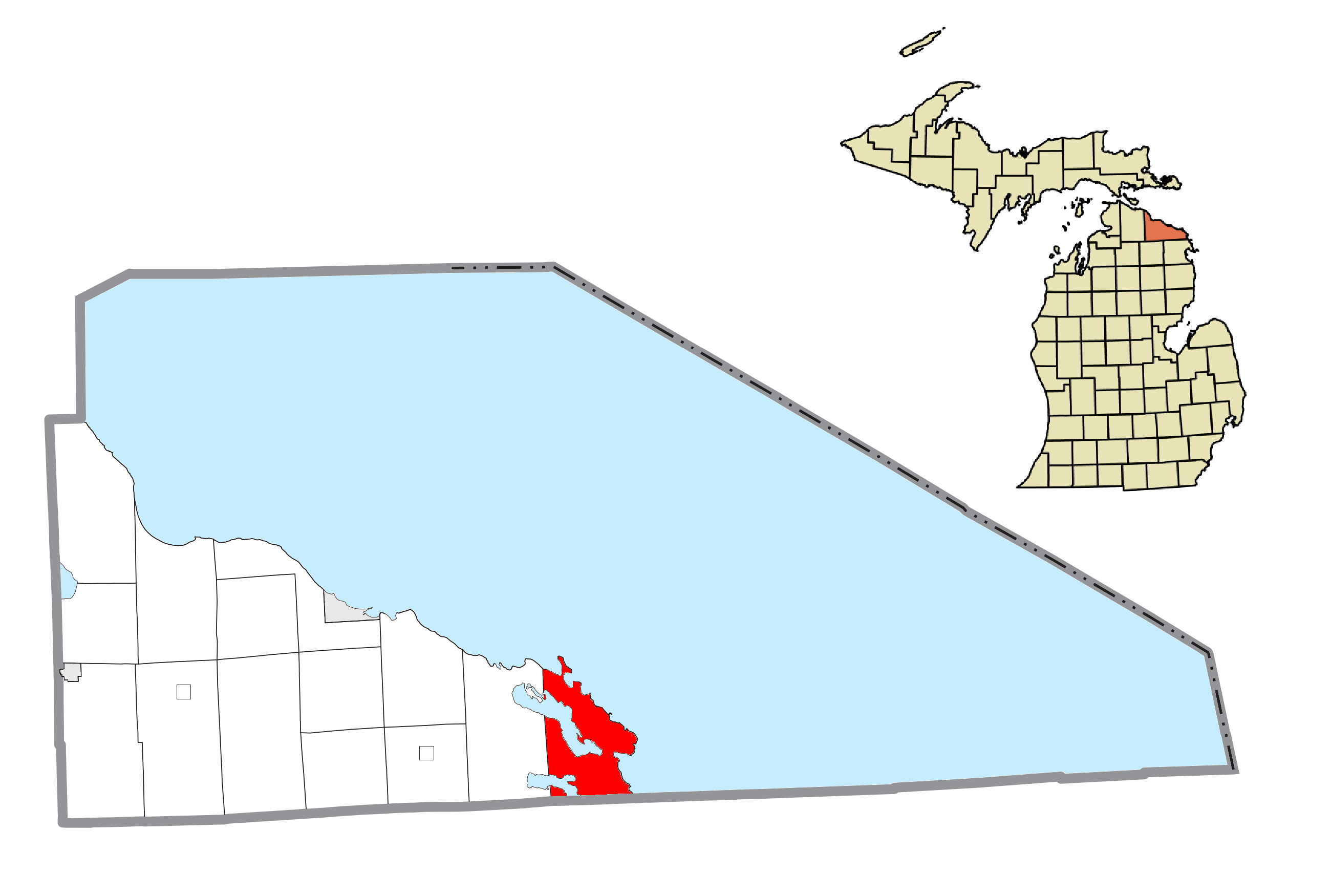
- Location within Presque Isle County

- Location within the state of Michigan Presque Isle Township (the United States)
- Coordinates: 45°17′14″N 83°28′26″W
- Country: United States
- State: Michigan
- County: Presque Isle

Government
  - Supervisor: Stephen Lang

Area
  - Total: 47.2 sq mi (122.2 km^{2})
  - Land: 35.6 sq mi (92.2 km^{2})
  - Water: 11.6 sq mi (30.0 km^{2})
- Elevation: 600 ft (183 m)

Population (2020)
  - Total: 1,698
  - Density: 47.7/sq mi (18.4/km^{2})
- Time zone: UTC-5 (Eastern (EST))
  - Summer (DST): UTC-4 (EDT)
- ZIP code(s): 49777
- Area code: 989
- FIPS code: 26-66340
- GNIS feature ID: 1626943
- Website: Official website

Presque Isle Township is a civil township of Presque Isle County in the U.S. state of Michigan. The population was 1,698 at the 2020 census.

== Communities ==
Presque Isle is a small unincorporated community located within Presque Isle Township along Lake Huron. It is approximately 15 miles north of Alpena, and 15 miles south of Rogers City.

The community and the township are named for Presque Isle (literally, "almost an island") which is French for "peninsula". This peninsula, for which the entire county is named, sits in the northern part of the township and is home to two historic lighthouses. Only one narrow strip of land, a tombolo, at the southern end of the peninsula connects it to the mainland. Sunrise and sunset over Lake Huron are both viewable from the sandy beaches along this strip of land. Presque Isle Harbor Marina, a restaurant, and a gift shop are located there as well. The community of Presque Isle is located a few miles south of this peninsula and includes a post office, seasonal gas station, chapel, community center, library, and a historic inn, the Presque Isle Lodge. The community sprung up around the homestead of John Kauffman, which currently serves as the community center. As early as the 1880s Presque Isle was frequented by hunters, fisherman, and summer vacationers and eventually the Fireside Inn, Birch Hill Hotel, and Grand Lake Hotel were built at the turn of the century to meet this demand.

The Old Presque Isle Lighthouse, built in 1840, is located at the north end of Presque Isle Harbor; according to local legend, it is haunted. The New Presque Isle Lighthouse was built in 1870 and is the tallest climbable tower on the Great Lakes. Both lighthouses have museums, open seasonally to the public. The 1870 lighthouse museum houses a beautifully preserved Third Order Fresnel Lens which remained active in the tower until recent years. Both lighthouses guided sailors to Presque Isle Harbor, the only natural harbor between Detroit and Mackinac, and a critically important wooding station on Lake Huron in the days before coal burning steamships. The many reefs and rocky shoals up and down the coast from Presque Isle Harbor are home to dozens of shipwrecks within the protected waters of Thunder Bay National Marine Sanctuary, which now extends from Alcona County to Cheboygan County.

Presque Isle is also home to Camp Chickagami, a boys' camp on Lake Esau opened in 1929 and currently owned and operated by the Episcopal Diocese of Eastern Michigan.

== Geography ==
According to the United States Census Bureau, the township has a total area of 47.2 square miles (122.2 km^{2}), of which 35.6 square miles (92.2 km^{2}) is land and 11.6 square miles (30.0 km^{2}) (24.57%) is water. Because of its irregular shape, the civil township includes land from portions of two survey townships. Lafarge Presque Isle Quarry (formerly Stoneport, an open-pit limestone quarry) lies along Lake Huron between Presque Isle Harbor and False Presque Isle and is the township's largest employer.

Presque Isle Township contains two nearly identical seven mile long inland lakes, Grand Lake and Long Lake. Each lake is over 5000 acres. Both lakes have been featured twice on the Outdoor Channel program Major League Fishing for their excellent large and smallmouth bass fishing. Grand Lake has upwards of a dozen islands, and both lakes feature "Sandies" or sandbars where boaters gather on weekends.

== Demographics ==
As of the census of 2000, there were 1,691 people, 748 households, and 558 families residing in the township. The population density was 47.5 inhabitants per square mile (18.3/km^{2}). There were 1,595 housing units at an average density of 44.8 per square mile (17.3/km^{2}). The racial makeup of the township was 98.40% White, 0.35% African American, 0.12% Native American, 0.18% Asian, 0.06% Pacific Islander, 0.12% from other races, and 0.77% from two or more races. Hispanic or Latino of any race were 0.77% of the population.

There were 748 households, out of which 20.9% had children under the age of 18 living with them, 70.7% were married couples living together, 2.4% had a female householder with no husband present, and 25.3% were non-families. 22.7% of all households were made up of individuals, and 8.7% had someone living alone who was 65 years of age or older. The average household size was 2.26 and the average family size was 2.63.

In the township the population was spread out, with 17.5% under the age of 18, 4.4% from 18 to 24, 20.2% from 25 to 44, 33.9% from 45 to 64, and 24.0% who were 65 years of age or older. The median age was 50 years. For every 100 females, there were 109.3 males. For every 100 females age 18 and over, there were 107.9 males.

The median income for a household in the township was $41,705, and the median income for a family was $44,671. Males had a median income of $40,724 versus $27,443 for females. The per capita income for the township was $23,938. About 2.7% of families and 3.9% of the population were below the poverty line, including 4.7% of those under age 18 and 2.6% of those age 65 or over.
