= Rogers City, Michigan =

- City
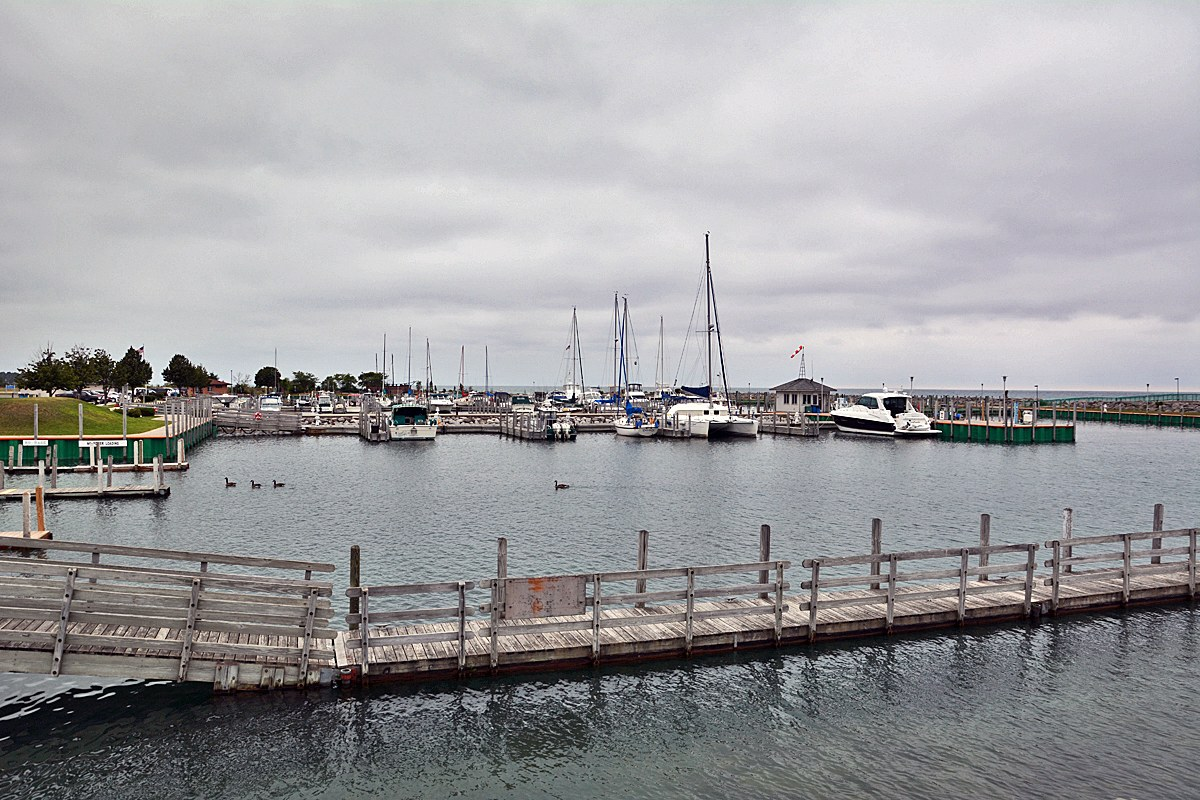
- Rogers City Marina on Lake Huron

- Seal
- Nicknames: "The Nautical City", "R.C."
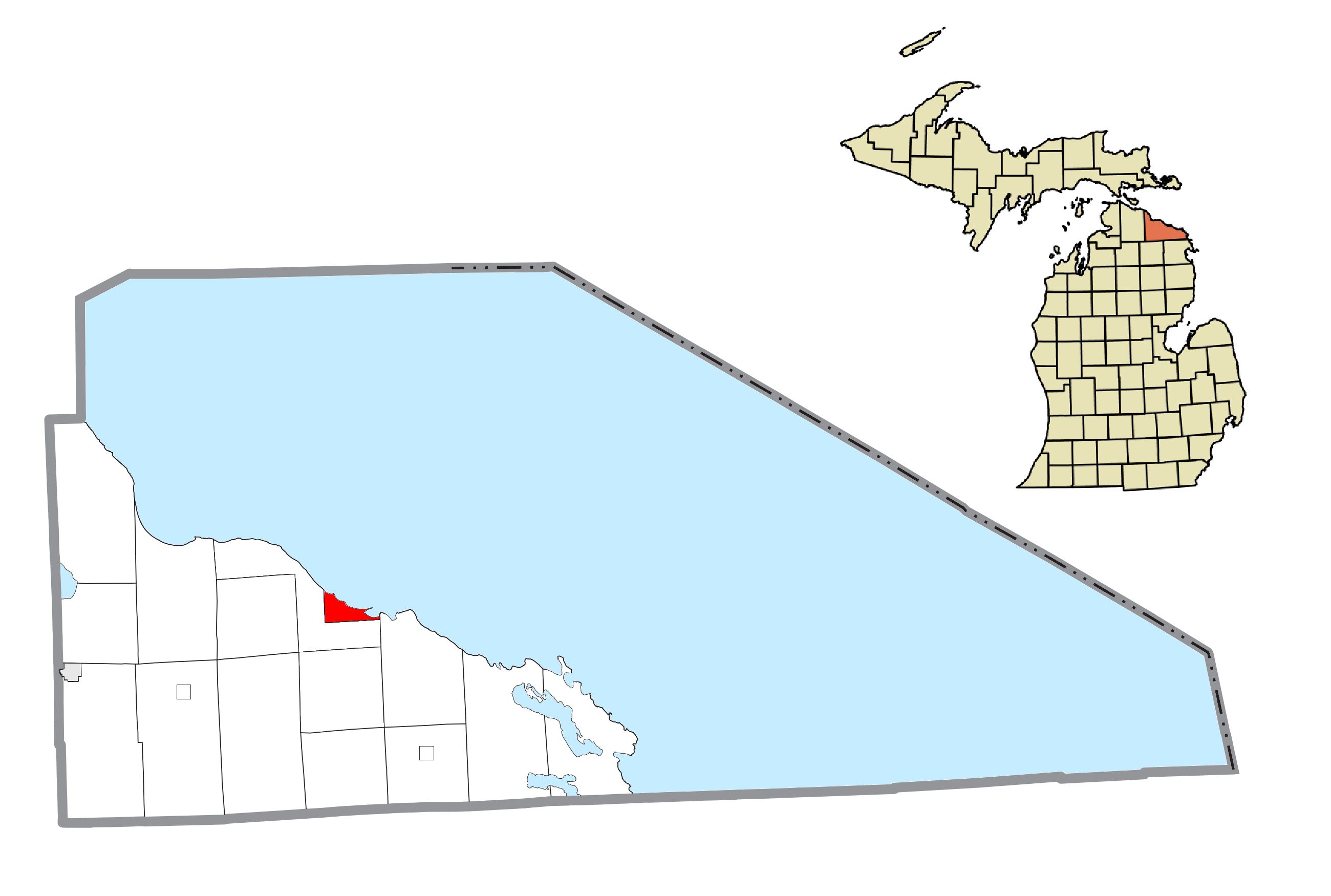
- Location within Presque Isle County

- Location within the state of Michigan
- Coordinates: 45°25′08″N 83°49′06″W
- Country: United States
- State: Michigan
- County: Presque Isle

Government
  - Type: City council
  - Mayor: Scott McLennan

Area
  - Total: 8.36 sq mi (21.65 km^{2})
  - Land: 4.54 sq mi (11.75 km^{2})
  - Water: 3.82 sq mi (9.90 km^{2})
- Elevation: 597 ft (182 m)

Population (2020)
  - Total: 2,850
  - Density: 628.5/sq mi (242.65/km^{2})
- Time zone: UTC-5 (Eastern (EST))
  - Summer (DST): UTC-4 (EDT)
- ZIP code(s): 49779
- Area code: 989
- FIPS code: 26-69260
- GNIS feature ID: 0636115
- Website: Official website

Rogers City is a city in the U.S. state of Michigan. It is the county seat of and the largest city in Presque Isle County. The city had a population of 2,850 at the 2020 census, a slight increase from 2,827 at the 2010 census.

The city is located in the northeast of Michigan's Lower Peninsula, along the shore of Lake Huron. Within the city's limits is the world's largest open-pit limestone quarry, the Port of Calcite. The port is one of the largest shipping ports on the Great Lakes.

== History ==
Rogers City was established in 1868, when William Evans Rogers, Albert Molitor, Frederick Denny Larke, and John Raymond arrived to survey the area and for logging. Molitor came to be seen as a despot by many residents and was assassinated in 1875. In 1870, a post office opened in the settlement under the name Rogers' Mills, though this name was changed several times; to Rogers City in 1872, to Rogers in 1895, and back to Rogers City in 1928. The community was incorporated as a village in 1877, and as a city in 1944.

On November 15, 1958, the freighter, SS Carl D. Bradley, sank in a storm on Lake Michigan. Of the 35 crew members, 33 died in the sinking, and 23 were from Rogers City, the ship's home port.

== Geography ==
According to the United States Census Bureau, the city has a total area of 8.34 square miles (21.60 km^{2}), of which 4.52 square miles (11.71 km^{2}) is land and 3.82 square miles (9.89 km^{2}) is water. The city is considered to be part of Northern Michigan.

=== Climate ===
Climate data for Rogers City, Michigan
Month	Jan	Feb	Mar	Apr	May	Jun	Jul	Aug	Sep	Oct	Nov	Dec	Year
Record high °F (°C)	55 (13)	60 (16)	75 (24)	93 (34)	95 (35)	100 (38)	100 (38)	100 (38)	95 (35)	87 (31)	76 (24)	63 (17)	100 (38)
Mean daily maximum °F (°C)	27 (−3)	29 (−2)	37 (3)	50 (10)	63 (17)	73 (23)	78 (26)	76 (24)	68 (20)	56 (13)	43 (6)	31 (−1)	53 (11)
Mean daily minimum °F (°C)	11 (−12)	10 (−12)	19 (−7)	30 (−1)	41 (5)	50 (10)	56 (13)	55 (13)	47 (8)	38 (3)	29 (−2)	18 (−8)	34 (1)
Record low °F (°C)	−24 (−31)	−37 (−38)	−14 (−26)	2 (−17)	25 (−4)	30 (−1)	41 (5)	33 (1)	29 (−2)	20 (−7)	4 (−16)	−22 (−30)	−37 (−38)
Average precipitation inches (mm)	1.84 (47)	1.22 (31)	1.86 (47)	2.18 (55)	2.55 (65)	2.67 (68)	2.94 (75)	3.68 (93)	2.96 (75)	2.55 (65)	1.99 (51)	1.99 (51)	28.43 (723)

== Transportation ==
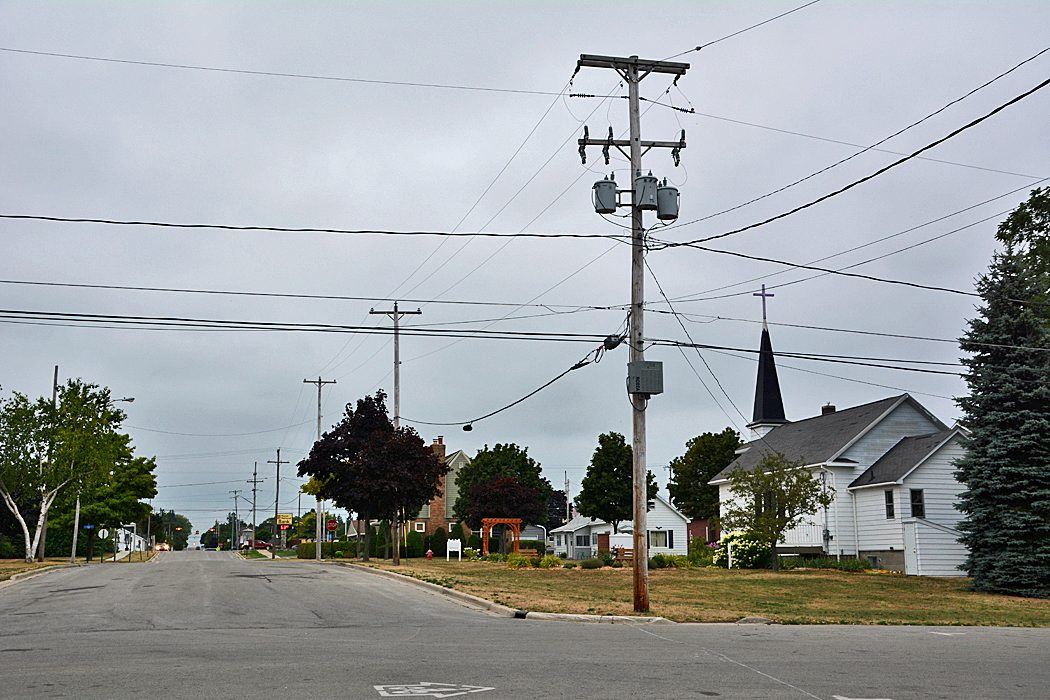
Erie Street

=== Airports ===
- Presque Isle County Airport

The nearest commercial airports are Alpena County Regional Airport and Cherry Capital Airport (Traverse City)

=== Highways ===
- US 23
- Bus. US 23
- M-68
- F-21

=== Bus ===
- Indian Trails provides daily intercity bus service between St. Ignace and Bay City, Michigan.

=== Trails ===
- Huron Sunrise Trail to Forty Mile Point

== Demographics ==
Historical population
Census	Pop.	Note	%±
1880	325		—
1890	431		32.6%
1900	544		26.2%
1910	705		29.6%
1920	2,109		199.1%
1930	3,278		55.4%
1940	3,072		−6.3%
1950	3,873		26.1%
1960	4,722		21.9%
1970	4,275		−9.5%
1980	3,923		−8.2%
1990	3,642		−7.2%
2000	3,322		−8.8%
2010	2,827		−14.9%
2020	2,850		0.8%
U.S. Decennial Census

=== 2020 census ===
As of the 2020 census, Rogers City had a population of 2,850. The median age was 52.5 years. 17.0% of residents were under the age of 18 and 30.6% of residents were 65 years of age or older. For every 100 females there were 90.8 males, and for every 100 females age 18 and over there were 90.2 males age 18 and over.

0.0% of residents lived in urban areas, while 100.0% lived in rural areas.

There were 1,378 households in Rogers City, of which 20.0% had children under the age of 18 living in them. Of all households, 41.7% were married-couple households, 20.4% were households with a male householder and no spouse or partner present, and 32.1% were households with a female householder and no spouse or partner present. About 39.6% of all households were made up of individuals and 20.9% had someone living alone who was 65 years of age or older.

There were 1,612 housing units, of which 14.5% were vacant. The homeowner vacancy rate was 2.1% and the rental vacancy rate was 6.0%.

Racial composition as of the 2020 census
Race	Number	Percent
White	2,674	93.8%
Black or African American	8	0.3%
American Indian and Alaska Native	16	0.6%
Asian	28	1.0%
Native Hawaiian and Other Pacific Islander	0	0.0%
Some other race	9	0.3%
Two or more races	115	4.0%
Hispanic or Latino (of any race)	46	1.6%

=== 2010 census ===
As of the census of 2010, there were 2,827 people, 1,328 households, and 800 families residing in the city. The population density was 625.4 inhabitants per square mile (241.5/km^{2}). There were 1,628 housing units at an average density of 360.2 per square mile (139.1/km^{2}). The racial makeup of the city was 97.3% White, 0.6% African American, 0.5% Native American, 0.7% Asian, and 0.8% from two or more races. Hispanic or Latino of any race were 0.8% of the population.

There were 1,328 households, of which 20.4% had children under the age of 18 living with them, 47.8% were married couples living together, 8.6% had a female householder with no husband present, 3.8% had a male householder with no wife present, and 39.8% were non-families. 36.2% of all households were made up of individuals, and 18% had someone living alone who was 65 years of age or older. The average household size was 2.03 and the average family size was 2.60.

The median age in the city was 51.9 years. 15.7% of residents were under the age of 18; 5% were between the ages of 18 and 24; 19% were from 25 to 44; 31.4% were from 45 to 64; and 29% were 65 years of age or older. The gender makeup of the city was 47.7% male and 52.3% female.

=== 2000 census ===
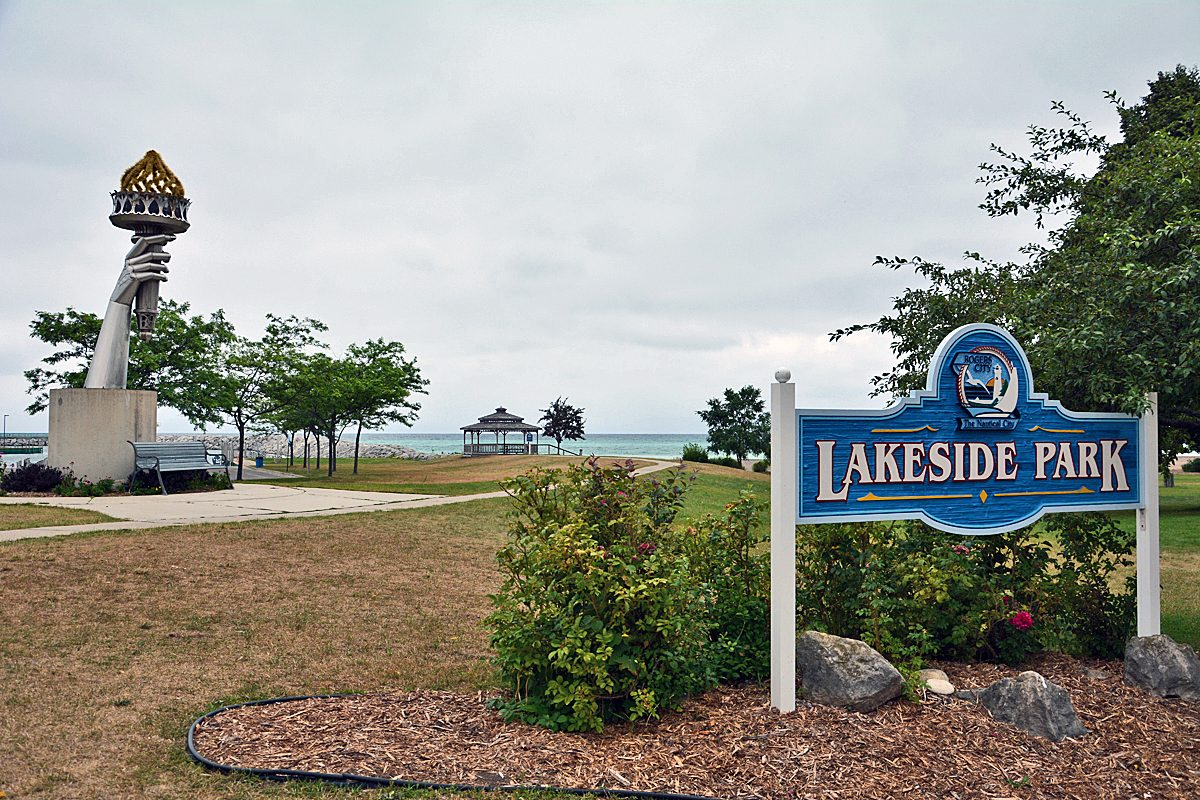
Lakeside Park

As of the census of 2000, there were 3,322 people, 1,480 households, and 914 families residing in the city. The population density was 727.2 inhabitants per square mile (280.8/km^{2}). There were 1,626 housing units at an average density of 355.9 per square mile (137.4/km^{2}). The racial makeup of the city was 98.43% White, 0.03% African American, 0.69% Native American, 0.27% Asian, 0.03% from other races, and 0.54% from two or more races. Hispanic or Latino of any race were 0.45% of the population.

There were 1,480 households, out of which 24.3% had children under the age of 18 living with them, 50.9% were married couples living together, 7.8% had a female householder with no husband present, and 38.2% were non-families. 35.1% of all households were made up of individuals, and 18.9% had someone living alone who was 65 years of age or older. The average household size was 2.17 and the average family size was 2.78.

In the city, the population was spread out, with 20.4% under the age of 18, 7.2% from 18 to 24, 23.2% from 25 to 44, 23.5% from 45 to 64, and 25.8% who were 65 years of age or older. The median age was 44 years. For every 100 females, there were 89.9 males. For every 100 females age 18 and over, there were 84.8 males.

The median income for a household in the city was $29,531, and the median income for a family was $36,310. Males had a median income of $31,515 versus $19,107 for females. The per capita income for the city was $17,750. About 5.3% of families and 7.6% of the population were below the poverty line, including 4.5% of those under age 18 and 10.3% of those age 65 or over.

== Education ==
Rogers City Area Schools consist of an elementary school (K-5) and Middle/High School (6-12). The wrestling, cross country, bowling, volleyball, baseball, football, and softball teams all have a reputation for being successful.

== Economy ==
The northeast corner of Michigan has an industrial base. Rogers City is the locale of the world's largest limestone quarry and one of the world's largest limestone processing plant, which is also used in steel making all along the Great Lakes. Water transport has been formative to the economy. This ties to the world's largest cement plant, which is in Alpena to the south. Both of these landmarks are recognized by historical markers.

== Local attractions ==
- Rogers City Municipal Marina has nearly 100 slips, most on floating docks. There is a fishing platform on the east wall for breakwater fishing.
- P. H. Hoeft State Park has one mile (1.6 km) of sandy shoreline and 301 acres (1.22 km^{2}) on Lake Huron. Hiking trails run through the forest and along the lake. There is a 142 site campground. The day use area has a playground, picnic sites, and a beach. It was one of the fourteen original Michigan state parks, and the land was donated by lumber baron Paul H. Hoeft on January 2, 1922. It is a 'four season park' offering camping even in the winter.
- Great Lakes Lore Maritime Museum tells the story of Rogers City's port activities, the seafarers of the Great Lakes, and the lost limestone carrier SS Carl D. Bradley that was homeported here.
- Presque Isle County Historical Museum
- A list and link for state historical markers is at Presque Isle County.

== Local events ==
- Memorial Day Weekend Open House including Afternoon of Arts & Crafts at Forty Mile Point Light
- Murals on Main Art Festival held downtown mid-June.
- Presque Isle County Fair, Millersburg, Michigan, last weekend in June
- Rogers City Nautical Festival, first complete week in August
- Fat Hogs Fishing Frenzie, annual Salmon Tournament, Labor Day weekend
- Posen Potato Festival, Posen, Michigan, first weekend in September
- Annual Great Lakes Lighthouse Festival—Four days in second week in October, Forty Mile Point Open For Tours All Four Days

== Media ==
=== Newspapers ===
- The local newspaper, the Presque Isle County Advance, has served the area since 1878. The Advance made statewide news itself in February 2006, when it fell victim to a fire that also destroyed Big D's Pizza. Both businesses recovered, with Big D's moving to a new location and the Advance moving into a new building on the same location 10 months later.
- The Alpena News is also widely available in the area.

=== Television ===
The following television stations are available over-the-air:

- Channel 4: WTOM-TV "TV 7&4" (NBC) (Cheboygan; satellite of WPBN-TV, Traverse City)
- Channel 6: WCML "CMU Public Television" (PBS) (Alpena; satellite of WCMU-TV, Mount Pleasant)
- Channel 8: WGTQ "ABC 29&8" (ABC) (Sault Ste. Marie; satellite of WGTU, Traverse City)
- Channel 10: WWUP-TV "9&10 News" (CBS) (Sault Ste. Marie; satellite of WWTV, Cadillac)
- Channel 11: WBKB-TV "Channel 11 News" (CBS, Fox on DT2) (Alpena)
- Channel 45: WFUP "Fox 32" (Fox) (Vanderbilt; satellite of WFQX-TV Cadillac)

Charter Communications is the local cable provider for Rogers City; the system offers all the above channels, as well as WNEM-DT2 (MyNetworkTV, Bay City) and CBMT (CBC Television, Montreal).

=== Radio ===
WHAK-AM 960 is the heritage station in Rogers City. All three local stations licensed to Rogers City now broadcast out of studios in Alpena, leaving Rogers City without a truly locally based station of its own.

The following radio stations can be heard in Rogers City

FM

Call Sign	Frequency	City Broadcast From
WPHN	90.5	Gaylord (contemporary Christian music)
WCML	91.7	Alpena; studios in Mount Pleasant (public radio)
WFDX	92.5	Atlanta; studios in Traverse City (classic hits)
WKJZ	94.9	Hillman; studios in Tawas City (adult hits)
WRGZ	96.7	Rogers City; studios in Alpena (country music)
WHAK-FM	99.9	Rogers City; studios in Alpena (oldies)
WHSB	107.7	Alpena (hot adult contemporary)

AM

Call Sign	Frequency	City Broadcast From
WTCM	580	Traverse City (talk radio)
WHAK	960	Rogers City; studios in Alpena (simulcast of 99.9 FM)

== See also ==
- Forty Mile Point Light
- Rogers City Branch
