= Michigan Limestone and Chemical Company =

Limestone quarry in Michigan, USA

Coordinates: 45.3910°N 83.7874°W

Michigan Limestone
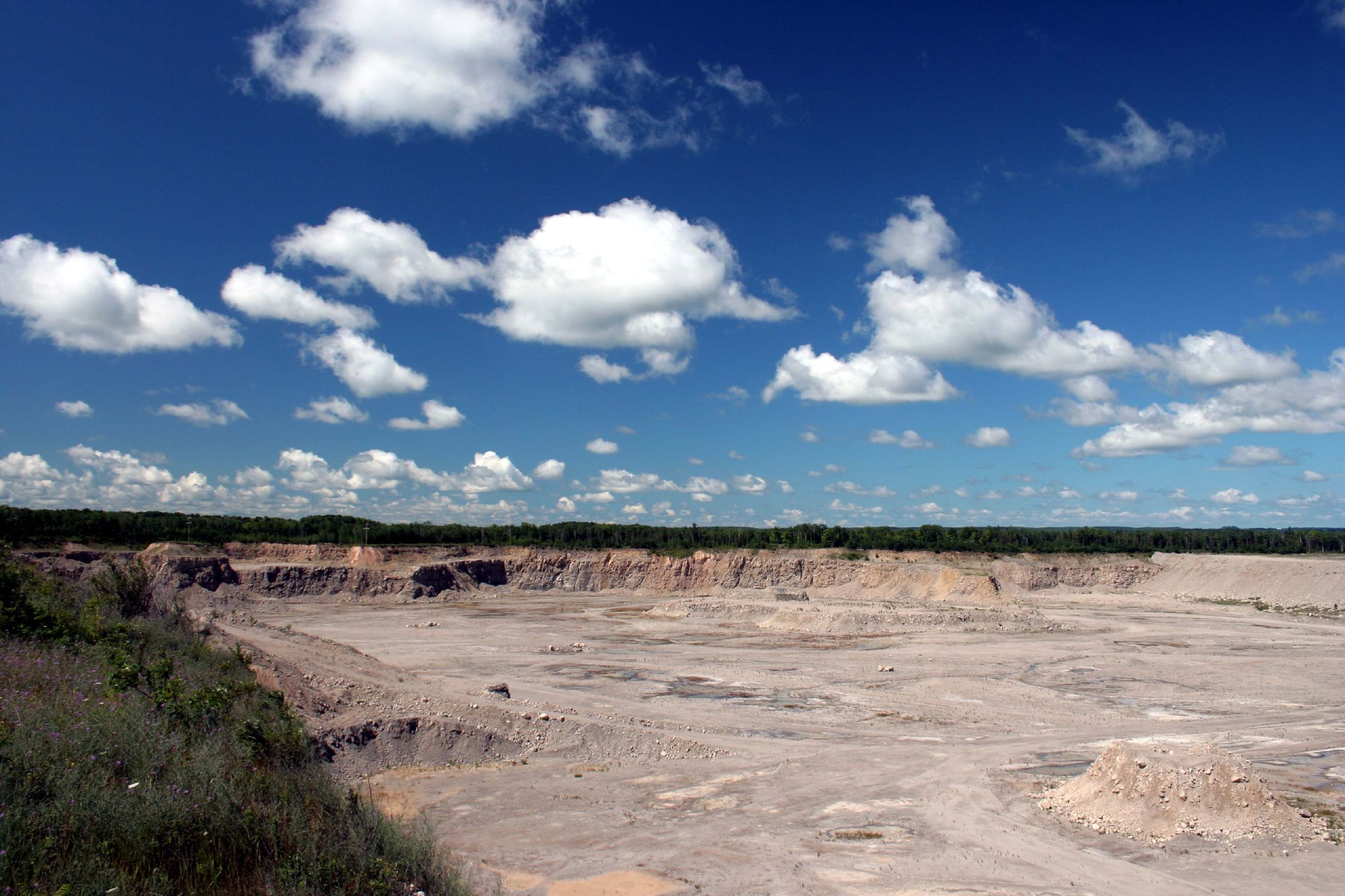
- Type: Public company
- Industry: Manufacturing, Mining
- Founded: 1912
- Headquarters: Rogers City, Michigan, U.S.
- Key people: board of directors
- Products: Chemicals, Mineral Products, and other Specialized Products and Services
- Number of employees: 160 (2008)

The Michigan Limestone and Chemical Company operated the world's largest limestone quarry (Michigan Limestone; a/k/a the "Calcite Quarry"; "Calcite Plant and Mill"; and "Carmeuse Lime and Stone"), which is located near Rogers City in Presque Isle County, Michigan. It was formed and organized in 1910; however, production did not begin until 1912. Ownership of the quarry has changed a number of times, but it is still one of the largest producers of limestone in the United States. The quarry was inextricably interlinked with lake shipping and railroad transportation.

The deposits mined at the quarry are underground in the northeastern part of Northern Michigan near Alpena and south of Rogers City along the shore of Lake Huron. The raw material is essential to a variety of industries; the major uses are for various aggregates, road-base stone cement, flux for iron and steel production, railroad track ballast, mine dusting, agricultural lime, and production of sugar. (Note: From sugar beets. See generally Sugar industry of the United States.)

== History ==
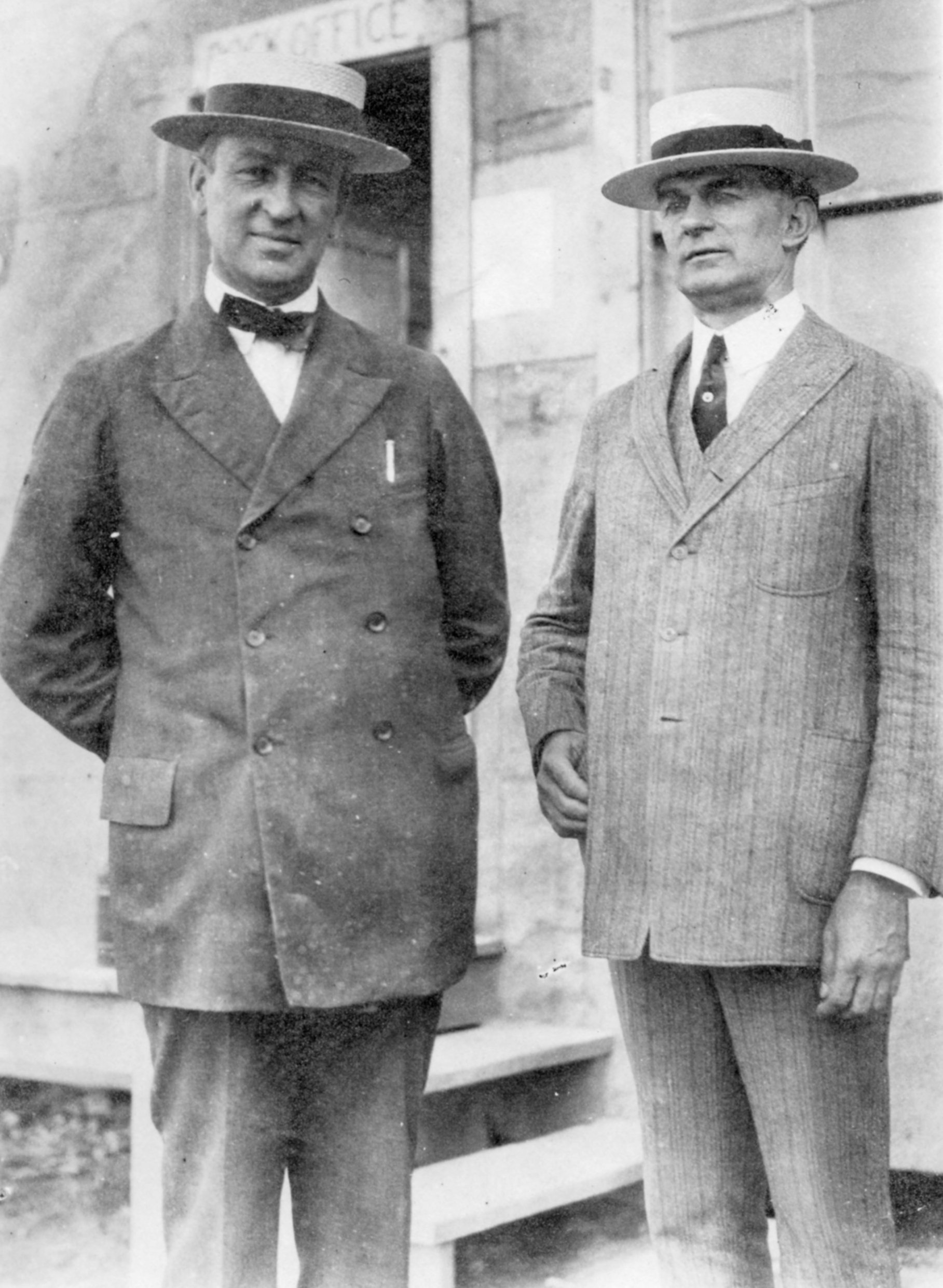
Carl Bradley and William White

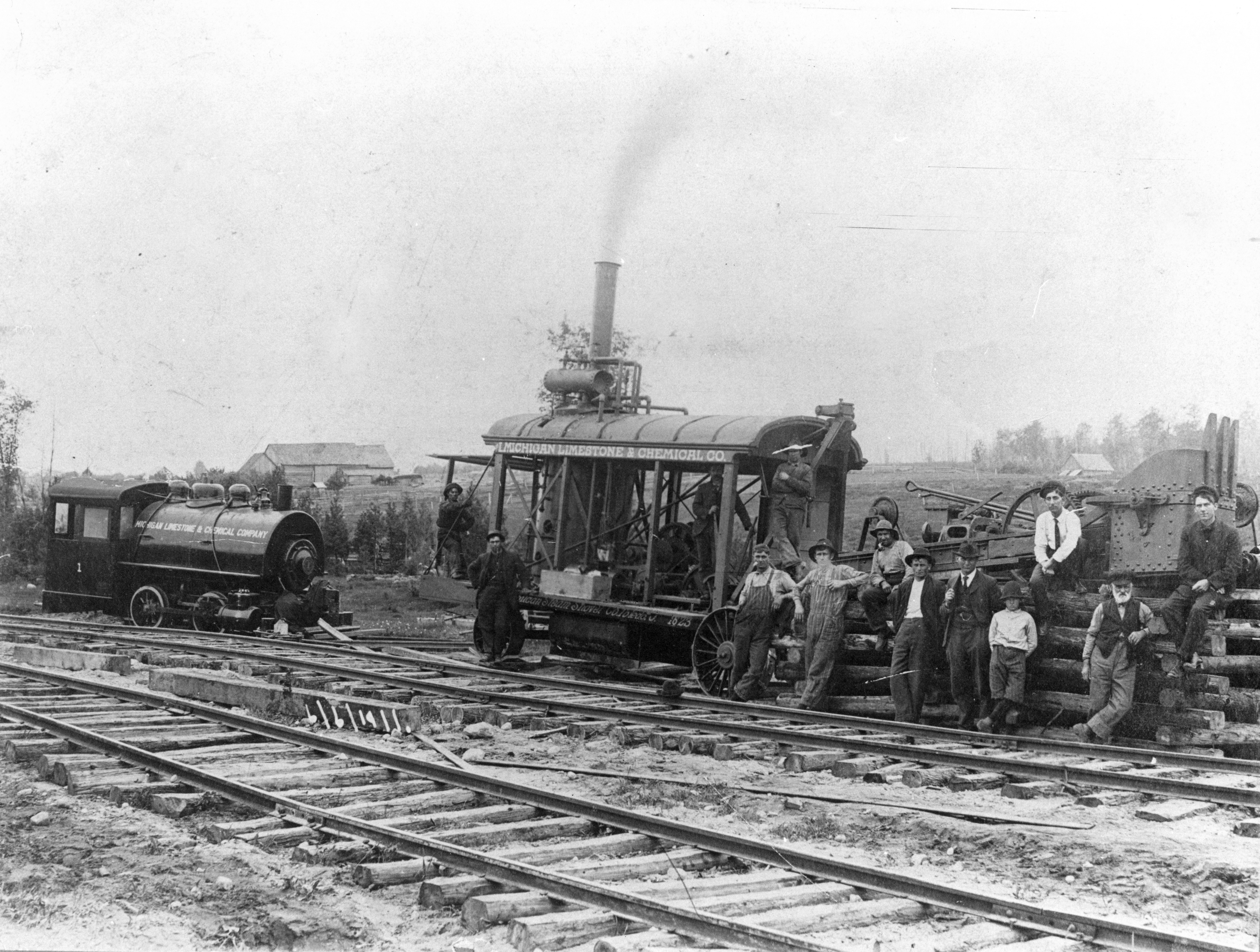
First steam shovel and steam locomotive

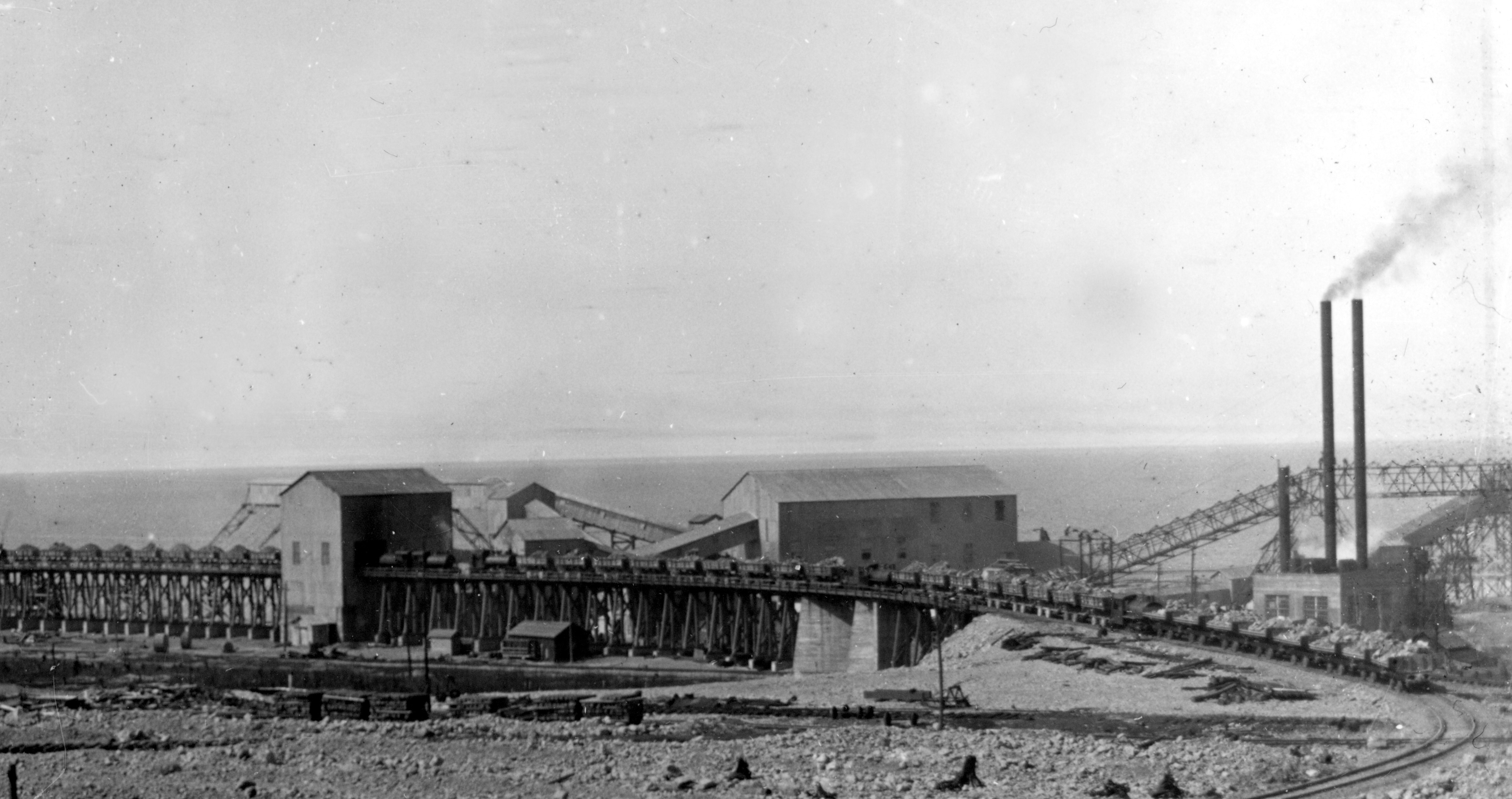
Trains, Crusher, Screen House, and Powerhouse August 5, 1914

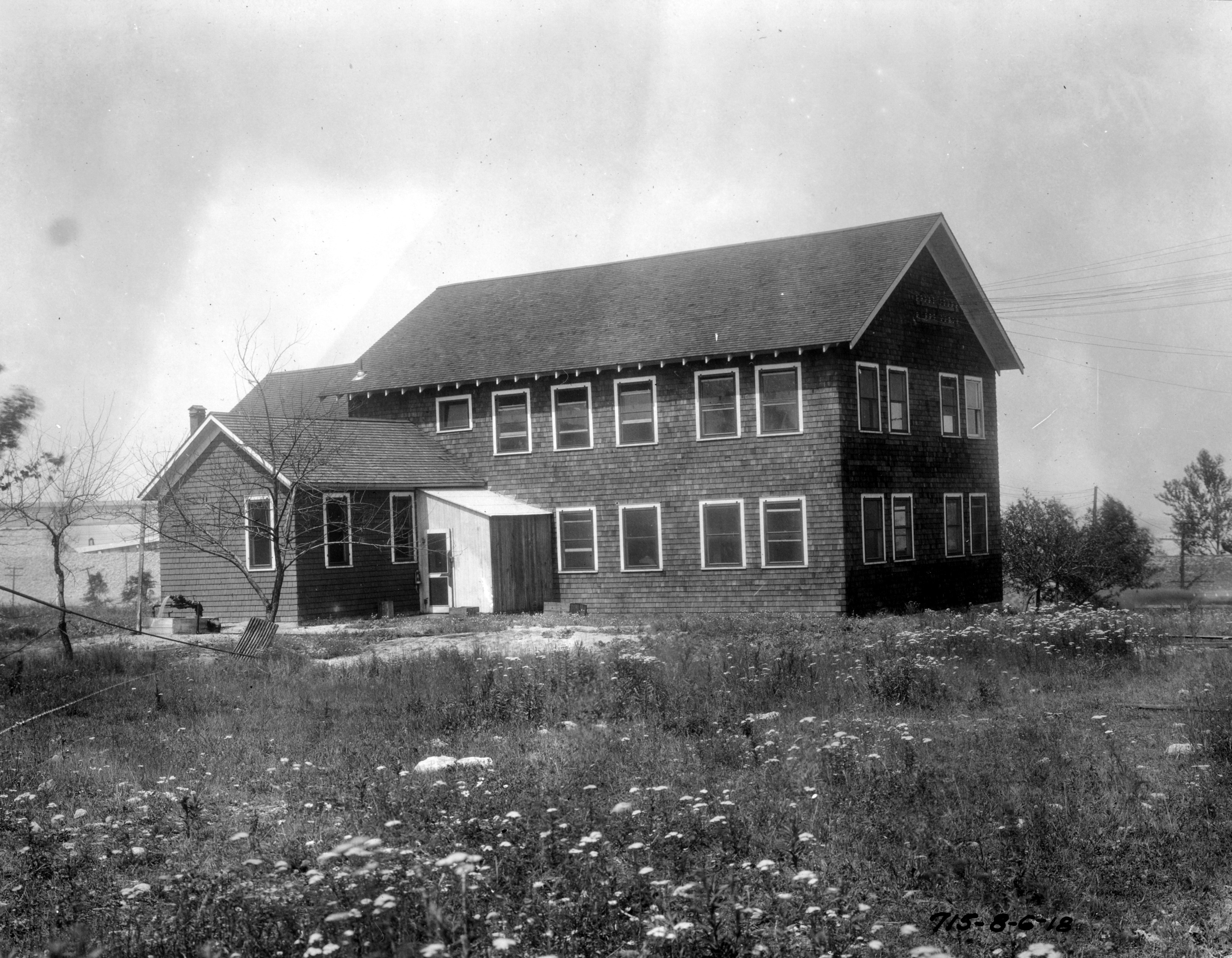
Main offices 1910 to 1926 (burned down)

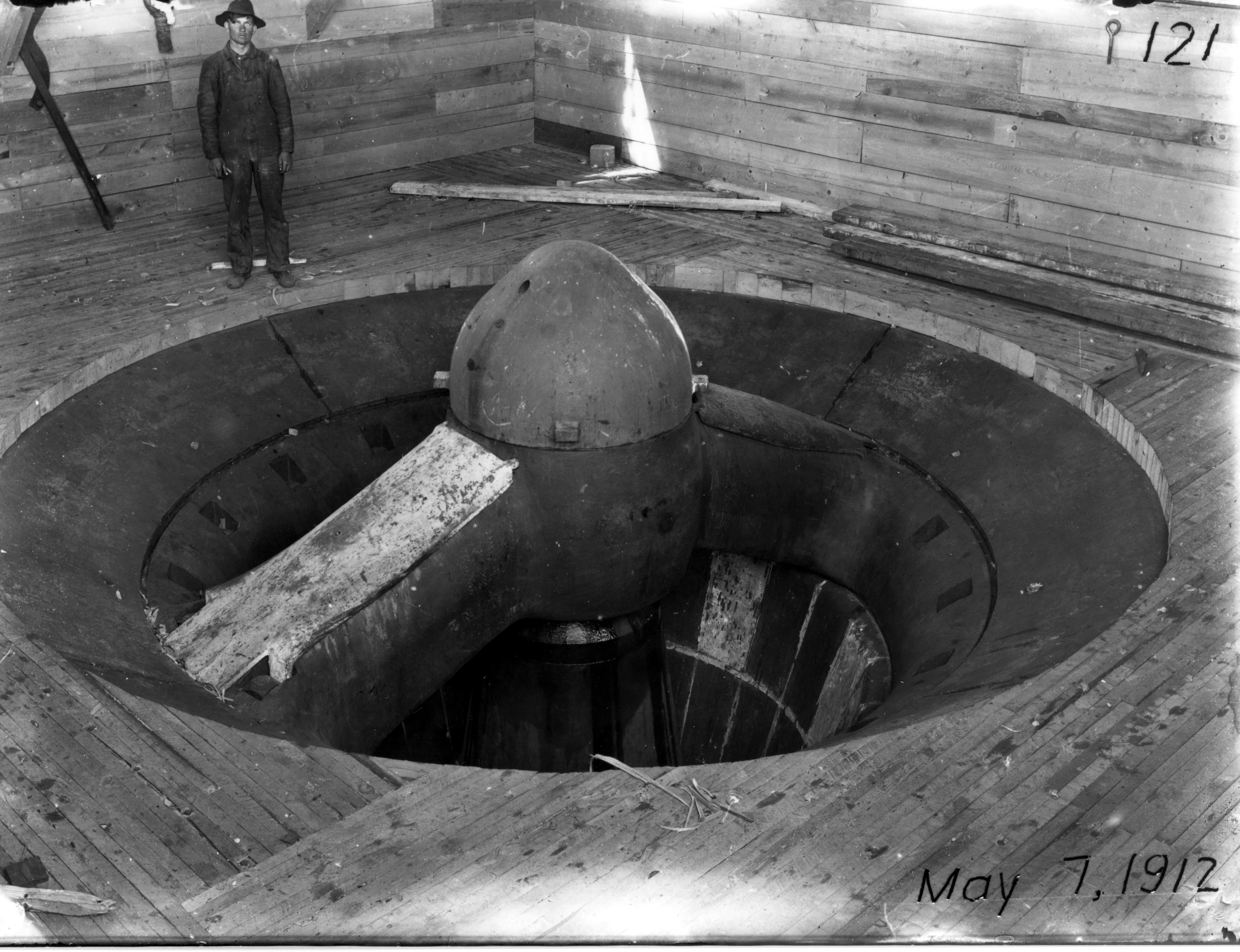
Opening of 42-inch crusher July 5, 1912

The mining engineer and geologist Henry H. Hindshaw, of New York City, started the analysis to establish the commercial value of limestone in Northern Lower Michigan in January 1909. He looked over and evaluated certain properties in the northeastern part of Michigan, between the small lumbering community of Rogers City and the nearby open pit mine of Crawford's Quarry. In February, Hindshaw first drilled samples for the Solvay Process Company of Syracuse, New York. The limestone samples were found to be of commercially usable quality, so the company took an option to purchase all the surrounding land by the Lake Huron shore south of Rogers City. Hindshaw then returned to New York City and got in contact with William F. White of the White Investing Company. The investor showed an interest in the commercial development of the limestone.

Hindshaw originally bought the land with the hope of using the Limestone directly as building material, i.e., stone facades. (Note: Cf. e.g., Indiana Limestone) That aspiration was misplaced; and was displaced by the realization that this would be marketable as a commodity for its chemical composition.

Limestone is a raw material essential in the industry. Major uses are for various aggregates, road-base stone cement, manufacture flux for iron and steel production, railroad ballast, mine dusting, and lime manufacture. Hindshaw determined the value was high due to the unusually high grade and purity of the limestone deposit underground in the northeastern region of Lower Michigan along the shore of Lake Huron, near Alpena and south of Rogers City. The quality and size of the limestone deposit at Rogers City, and the availability of easy water transportation, led to the development of the quarry and a port. Both quarry and port are named "Calcite," after the principal ingredient of limestone.

=== Quarry ===
It is the largest limestone quarry in the world, measuring 4 miles (6.4 km) long by 1.5 miles (2.4 km) wide, amounting to 8,924 acres (3,611 ha). It features mega loader vehicles that haul up to 195 tonnes (192 long tons; 215 short tons), that is 390,000 pounds (180,000 kg), in single trucks that have tires measuring 13 feet (4.0 m) in height.

The quarry and plant are currently owned and operated by Carmeuse Lime and Stone, with 115 employees. It has been described as a "man made Grand Canyon," as it is more than 150 feet (46 m) deep.

This is one of several dozen limestone quarries that have been located in Michigan. The Michigan Basin encompasses large areas of limestone bedrock.

The quarry exploits limestone and dolomite strata, part of the "Michigan Basin" and the "Rogers City" geologic unit and strata. "As proposed, the name Rogers City is applied to limestone and dolomite strata formerly considered part of the Dundee, which is here restricted to lower 140 feet (43 m) of section. Lower 8 feet (2.4 m) to 9 ft of Rogers City is dolomite; the upper part is limestone. Rogers City fauna is distinctive from that of Dundee. Age is Middle Devonian." (Note: "A new species of gastropod from the genus PORCELLIA is described from the Middle Devonian Rogers City Limestone. The Rogers City crops out in the northeastern part of the Michigan basin for about 50 km from Middle Island near Rockport Quarry to just west of Rogers City, where it disappears beneath the glacial cover. It is quarried extensively because of its pure chemical quality. The unit is about 21 m thick and was subdivided into six numbered units by Ehlers and Kesling (1970). Units 1 and 2 (supratidal deposits) are dolostones, 3 and 4 (back-reef lagoonal deposits) are fine-grained limestones with a depauperate fauna, and units 5 and 6 (reef) are very coarse-grained limestone with a very diverse fauna dominated by corals, stromatoporoids, bryozoans, and gastropods. PORCELLIA has been found only in Unit 1, the basal dolostone. The fauna of the Rogers City is dissimilar from that of the underlying Dundee Limestone and also from that of the overlying Traverse Group, both of which can be correlated with sections of the Appalachian basin. The fauna of Rogers City, however, correlates with the fauna of Germany, Manitoba, and western North America. Source: GNU records (USGS DDS-6; Reston GNULEX).")

This open pit mine, operating for 110 years since 1912, was at times called "the Calcite Quarry" "Calcite Plant and Mill" and "Carmeuse Lime and Stone", mines 350 million year old deposits, and has shipped well over 750,000,000 tonnes (740,000,000 long tons; 830,000,000 short tons) of product to customers. It is within the Rogers City limestone, a part of the Dundee Limestone. Of the 7,000 acres (2,800 ha) on the site, about 3,000 are actively mined. The company predicts the site has reserves that can last 100 years.

The quarry is the subject of a well-known astronaut photo. It has been documented in an Emmy Award winning documentary film. As the director of the film notes:

“Initially I thought, it’s (a documentary) about a quarry,” Belanger said. “But it’s a human story. The quarry of course is limestone, it’s rock, but it’s how this natural resource becomes a driving force for our nation. Much of this limestone was used to build the Mackinac Bridge, it helped build the interstate highway system throughout the nation, and it's used in everyday items."

The Detroit and Mackinac Railway opened its Rogers City Branch in 1911. Service inside the mine dates back to before 1926. Pictures indicate that the yard was originally serviced by company-owned switching engines. Trackage included switches and even two interlocks inside the plant which date back to 1926. The railroad for the quarry is currently serviced by Lake State Railway, successor to the D&M.

Rogers City donated land to create a landmark in celebration of the quarry's centennial. Part of the landmark is a 6 foot (1.8 m) X 6-foot mural made of outdoor tiles created by master potter Guy Adamec from the Flint Institute of Arts. Part of the design "represent[s] the history of the quarry by depicting layers of quarry strata ranging from the Devonian Period to the current day. This ... [are depicted] in different colors of cement block to show the strata."

The United States Army and Air Force conduct simulated-fire phases within the Carmeuse Calcite Quarry area during Exercise Northern Strike.

According to the Oglebay Norton, this quarry is "producing high-calcium carbonate limestone ... and shipping between 7 and 10.5 million net tons (NT) per year, depending on market demand." The operation "produces nine base product sizes, from 5-1/2 inches down to sand-sized particles. These products can be blended together to meet most sizing specifications." (Note: Specifying that "We utilize a Quality Management System that is ISO 9001:2000 Certified to assure that customers will receive the product that meets their requirements. The quarry’s reserves have been extensively mapped, and this mapping is regularly updated to provide the customer with the consistent quality product specified.")

=== Company ===
Michigan Limestone and Chemical Company was founded in 1910 by White and a few of his investor capitalist colleagues, who purchased a 5,000-acre (2,000 ha) parcel of land of prime limestone deposits from the Rogers City Land Company. It was the lumber industry that had brought the first settlers to the northern area of the Lower Peninsula of Michigan, around the time of the Civil War. The first pioneer settlers arrived in the Rogers City vicinity in 1869, and they started the Rogers-Molitor Lumber Company. The lumber industry was the backbone of the economy in Rogers City, and Presque Isle County, until the second decade of the 20th century. By that time, most of the forests had been cut down, and the major lumber companies were moving their camps to fresh forests in the Upper Peninsula of Michigan (and into the nearby states of Wisconsin and Minnesota). Around this time Michigan Limestone and Chemical Company began construction of facilities for mining limestone.

White, whose residence was in New York City, served as president of Michigan Limestone and Chemical Company when he filed Articles of Association in the Presque Isle County Clerk's office at Rogers City making the company official on May 26, 1910. The Calcite port and quarry plant started operations in June 1910 and maintained offices in New York City and Rogers City. Hindshaw was the first general manager and was paid $3,500 per year. He was replaced in October by Joseph Jenkins of Alpena, Michigan, who was paid $3,000 a year. Carl D. Bradley of Chicago replaced Jenkins on October 12, 1911.

Bradley managed the construction of the limestone processing factory, which included a powerhouse, stone crusher, screen-house, conveyor power distribution system, a harbor with loading slip, ship loader, repair shop, and executive office building. Steam shovels were purchased for use in mining, and steam locomotives and dump cars were used to move the stone from the quarry to the crusher. A steam locomotive was purchased to haul the limestone from the quarry.

There was a 14-mile (23 km) spur track built by the company that led into the Calcite operations from the Detroit & Mackinac Railroad main line just west of Posen, Michigan. Production at the quarry began in early 1912 and the first cargoes of stone were shipped by steamer freighters in June of that year. The company received orders for limestone that far exceeded the most optimistic expectations.

Most of the stone mined at the Rogers City quarry was shipped on lake freighters to steel mills located along the lower Great Lakes at places like Detroit, Cleveland, Gary, and South Chicago. For most of the plant's history, its biggest customer was United States Steel (also known as U.S. Steel), the world's largest producer of steel products. Eventually, additional markets were found for the limestone in the agricultural, construction, chemical, and cement industries. The Rogers City area continued to develop and grow as the Calcite plant facilities grew. Within 20 years, the quarry at Rogers was the world's largest producer of limestone.

=== U.S. Steel ===
United States Steel Corporation was the first customer of the company. White and his partners were in contact with potential major consumers of limestone even before the company was officially formed. They were in negotiations with several steel companies and other companies that used quantities of limestone and concluded that if they built a massive quarry they would have potential consumers immediately. US Steel signed a contract within months of when the company was officially formed and a year before limestone was actually produced. Iroquois Iron Company of Chicago signed a contract with Michigan Limestone for the purchase of 50,000 tons of limestone. The limestone company was created, at least in part, with the idea that there was a waiting market for their product.

US Steel later purchased a controlling interest in Michigan Limestone in 1920 when the company was producing 1,000 tons of crushed limestone a day.

Bradley was promoted from general manager to president of Michigan Limestone. He also served as president of Michigan Limestone's fleet of self-unloading ships used to deliver the stone. Those ships were operated as the Bradley Transportation Company. Michigan Limestone and Bradley Transportation came under the full ownership of U.S. Steel upon Bradley's death in 1928. At that time U.S. Steel purchased all of the stock of both Michigan Limestone and the associated shipping concern, Bradley Transportation, and made both these companies subsidiaries of U.S. Steel. The company became a division in 1951 when the operations at Rogers City became U.S. Steel's "Northern District", since the main offices were moved to Detroit. The operation is still a major employer in northern Michigan. Its ownership has changed several times in recent years.

== Uses ==
The calcite limestone produced at Michigan Limestone is the white calcium carbonate chemical. It is low in iron, alumina, sulphur, carbonate phosphorus, silica, magnesium and titanium. Steel mills added limestone to molten iron in the blast furnaces. It is used to carry away impurities in the process of making steel. The material is also in widespread use in making cement. The limestone when burned at a temperature up to 2300 degrees Fahrenheit (999 degrees Celsius) produces just pure lime, which is used in everything from making paints, varnishes, sugar, glass, baking powder, and ammonia. Lime is also used in making chemicals such as soda ash, caustic soda, bleaching powders, and water softening salt. Limestone was used to fill the caissons that support the Mackinac Bridge.

Pulverized limestone is used to restore the lime that is needed to make plants grow. Continuous cultivation depletes lime out of the soil, making it acidic. Crops will not grow very well in that type of soil. Pulverized limestone is used to restore lime in the soil so crops grow properly. This type of soil conditioner is known as agricultural lime. Where soils are acidic crushed limestone can improve the crop yield. It does this by making the soil balanced and thereby allowing the plants to absorb more nutrients from the soil like they should through their roots. While lime is not a fertilizer itself, it can be used in combination with fertilizers. Agricultural lime can also be beneficial to soils where the land is used in raising farm animals like cows and goats. Bone growth is key to an animal's development and bones are composed primarily of calcium. Young calves get their needed calcium through milk, which has calcium as one of its major components so dairymen frequently apply agricultural lime to their fields because it increases milk production.

It is the indispensable ingredient for making calcium carbonate, which in turn is used to make white sugar from sugar beets. Michigan is a very large producer of beet sugar. (Note: "From farm fields to your table, the process of turning a sugarbeet seed into all-natural sugar takes many steps – some on the farm and others in the factory. It starts with planting the seeds each spring, continues through harvest in the fall, and wraps up during an annual sugarbeet processing campaign at Michigan Sugar Company’s factories in Bay City, Caro, Croswell, and Sebewaing." Pioneer Sugar and Big Chief Sugar "produce roughly 1.2 billion pounds of sugar each year.")

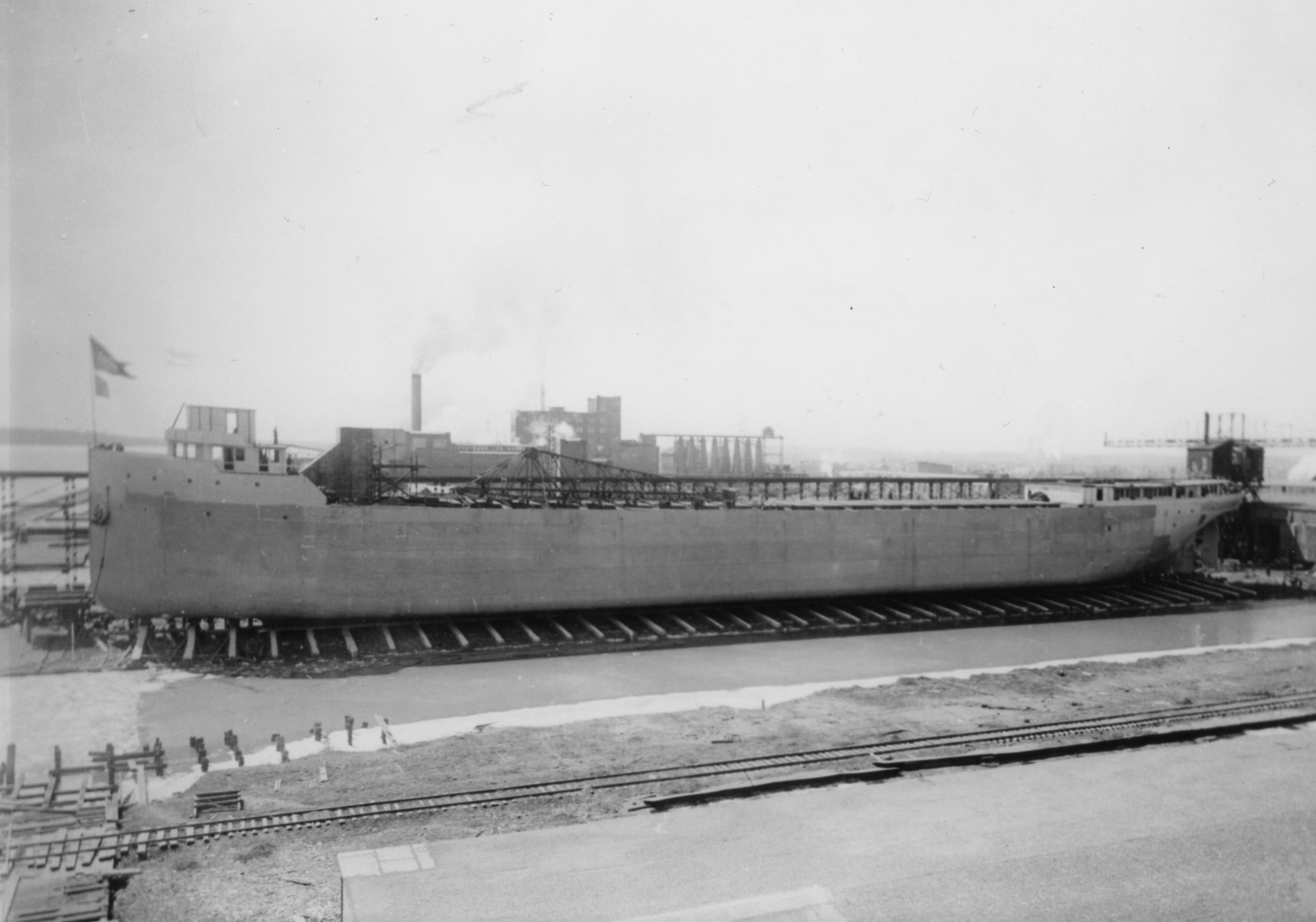
SS Calcite launch - March 30, 1912

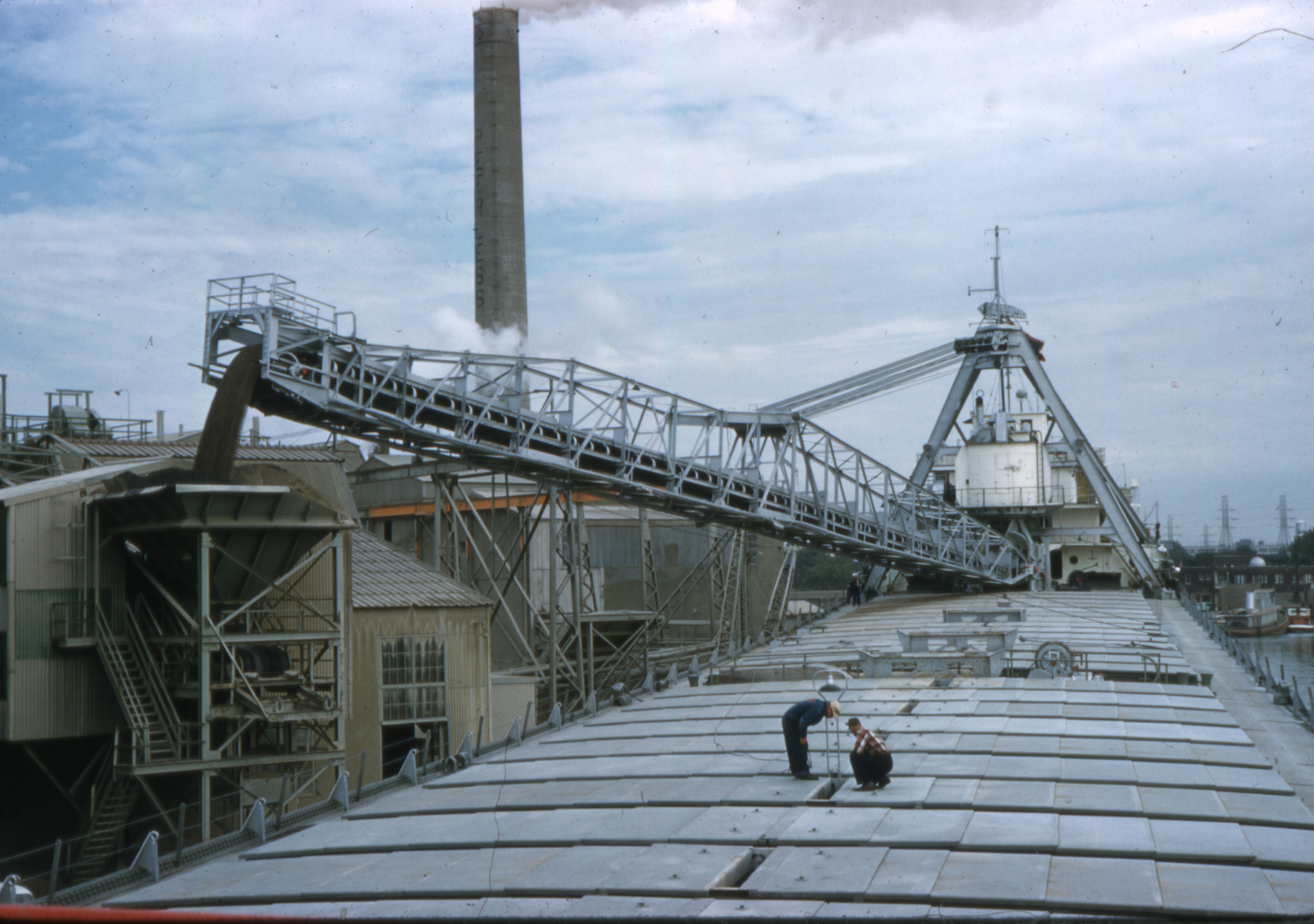
SS Bradley self-unloading in operation.

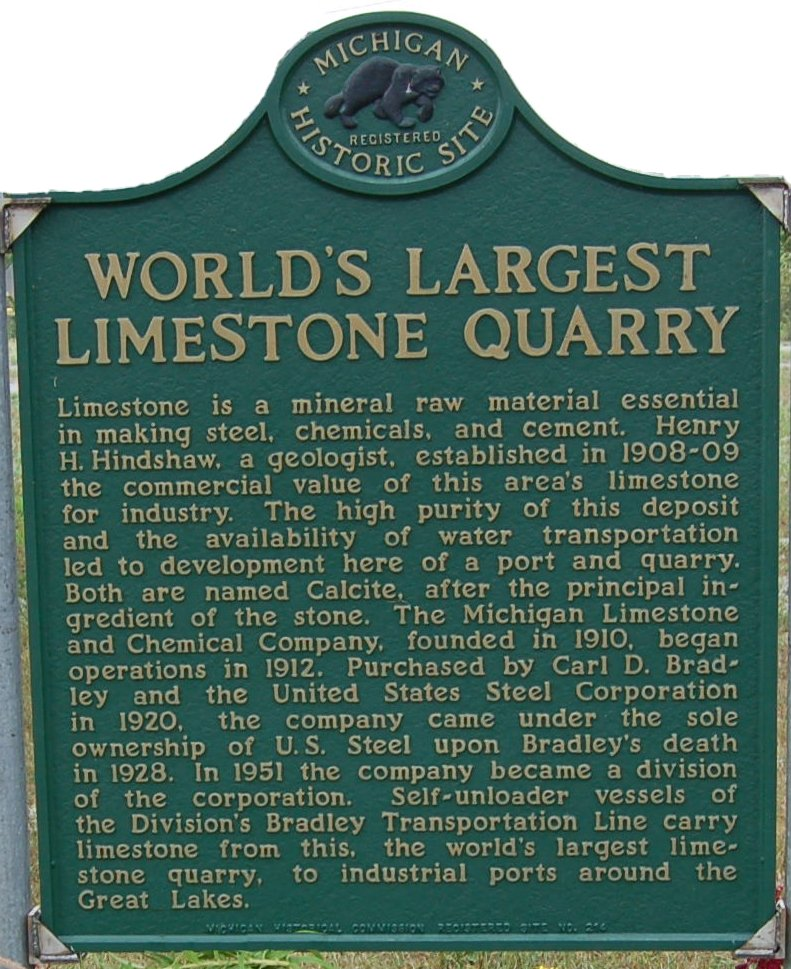
Rogers City limestone quarry

== Self-unloading ships of the company ==
Michigan Limestone and Chemical Company built three "revolutionary" ships between 1912 and 1917. They were named SS Calcite, SS W.F. White and the SS Carl D. Bradley (in 1927, this ship would be renamed John G. Munson, and a new SS Carl D. Bradley would be built). These ships were revolutionary in their own right. They represented the latest technology in "self-unloading" ships, then simply called "unloading ships".

In 1912, the company built its first steamship, SS Calcite. It was considerably larger than the first modern self-unloader ever built on the Great Lakes, which was the SS Wyandotte built in 1908. The Calcite was used to haul limestone from the company's quarry at Rogers City to Buffalo and Fairport, New York. The steamships W.F. White and Carl D. Bradley followed over the next few years. All the steamships' hulls were painted grey to minimize the appearance of the limestone dust that accumulated during loading and unloading.

The design of these early ore carrier self-unloaders was pretty much the same as today. The idea is that the "cargo hold" is built with its sides sloping toward the center of the ship along the keel. Where the two sides come together, a series of steel gates can be opened. This allows the material to drop onto a conveyor belt running the length of the ship beneath the "cargo hold." The conveyor belt carries the material up to an exchanger, where it is transferred to a second belt which runs up to the main deck, then through a long boom on the deck. The unloading swing boom hangs over the ship's side to discharge the material load onto the waiting customer's dock. The advantage of self-unloaders is that they can deliver the limestone material directly to a customer's dock without requiring expensive shoreside unloading rigs.

As the business grew over the years, the company built several more of these self-unloaders. These ships were operated under the name Bradley Transportation Company after 1920 and were known as the Bradley boats or the Bradley fleet. There are still self-unloaders that carry limestone from the Calcite plant through the Port of Calcite to industrial ports all around the Great Lakes. The SS Carl D. Bradley was lost in a storm in November 1958 while returning from delivering a load of limestone; 33 of the 35 crewmembers died, most of whom lived in or around the small town of Rogers City. No larger loss of lives has occurred in the lake freighter fleet since Bradley's sinking.

Ships such as the SS Carl D. Bradley would haul the limestone to steel mills in Gary, Indiana.

== Michigan historical marker ==
The company conducts yearly tours of the quarry. Typically the event is conjoined with Rogers City's annual Nautical City Festival. Then the public is permitted "to see some of the giant equipment" up close and personal that the plant uses. The experience highlights the grand scale of the operation and the equipment. The Alpena News has detailed the numbers, which may be of interest, but are too extensive to repeat here. "The Calcite Operation is one of 28 production facilities Carmeuse owns in North America and one of 94 production facilities the company owns around the world. The plant mines, processes and ships limestone via freighters on the Great Lakes, which haul the raw materials to the next location." As of 2019, 915,931,719 tons have been shipped from the Quarry. 1953 was the high water mark for production at 16.6 million tons. In prior days, the tailings were dumped into the lake, but that has ceased and they are now beneficially used. It would take 4,000 wheelbarrows full to fill the largest truck in the facility, and 12 hours to fill a freighter.

It is surrounded by vantage points.

This site should be considered as part of an effort to mine limestone in other parts of Michigan. For example, the Mill Creek Quarry opened near Mackinaw City, Michigan in 1912. That site is now part of the Michigan state parks system.

There is a Michigan State Historic Site historical marker at a viewing point over Michigan Limestone and Chemical Company facilities. (Note: "Limestone is a mineral raw material essential in making steel, chemicals, and cement. Henry H. Hindshaw, a geologist, established in 1908-09 the commercial value of this area's limestone for the industry. The high purity of this deposit and nearby water transportation led to the development here of a port and quarry. Both are named Calcite, after the principal ingredient of the stone. The Michigan Limestone and Chemical Company, founded in 1910, began operation in 1912. Purchased by Carl D. Bradley and the United States Steel Corporation in 1920, the company came under the ownership of U.S. Steel upon Bradley's death in 1928. In 1951 the company became a division of the corporation. Self-unloaders of the division's Bradley Transportation Line carry limestone from this, the world's largest limestone quarry, to industrial ports all around the Great Lakes.")

== See also ==
- Alabaster Historic District
- Exercise Northern Strike
- List of types of limestone
