= Rogers City Branch =

Railway line in Michigan

- The main line of the Rogers City Branch. Not shown: spurs and industrial track within the limestone quarry.

Overview
- Status: Abandoned
- Owner: Detroit and Mackinac Railway (1911–1992); Lake State Railway (1992–2000)
- Locale: Presque Isle County, Michigan
- Termini: Rogers City, Michigan; Posen, Michigan

History
- Opened: June 18, 1911
- Closed: 2000

Technical
- Line length: 13.6 mi (21.9 km)
- Track gauge: 1,435 mm (4 ft 8 1/2 in) standard gauge

The Rogers City Branch was a railway line in Presque Isle County, Michigan. It ran north from a junction with the Detroit and Mackinac Railway main line near Posen, Michigan, to Rogers City, Michigan, on the shore of Lake Huron. The Detroit and Mackinac opened the line in 1911, and it was abandoned by the Lake State Railway in 2000. A major customer on the branch was the limestone quarry in Calcite, east of Rogers City.

== History ==
The organizers of the Central Michigan Railroad, incorporated in 1888, proposed to build a line from Rogers City, Michigan, on the northern coast of the Lower Peninsula of Michigan, due south to the Indiana state line. This ambitious 330-mile (530 km) project was never built.

In 1893, the Alpena and Northern Railroad opened a line between Alpena, Michigan, where it connected with the Detroit, Bay City and Alpena Railroad, and LaRocque (now Hawks), in Presque Isle County. The line passed 9 miles (14 km) south of Rogers City; the A&N established a stop west of Posen at "Hoffman's" to serve Rogers City, and a stagecoach service linked the two locations.

Rogers City had to wait until 1911 for a direct railroad connection. The Detroit and Mackinac Railway, successor to the Alpena and Northern Railroad and the Detroit, Bay City and Alpena Railroad, constructed a 13.6-mile (21.9 km) from the former A&N main line near Posen to Rogers City. The line opened on June 18, 1911. A major source of traffic for the branch was the limestone quarry east of Rogers City in Calcite, once the world's largest.

The Lake State Railway acquired the Detroit and Mackinac Railway on February 17, 1992. At the time, service on the Rogers City Branch had declined to a single weekly trip, and three customers remained between Rogers City and Alpena. The Lake State Railway abandoned the branch, and the remainder of the old Alpena and Northern main line, in 2000. As of 2022, there are plans to convert the right-of-way into a rail trail, linking the North Eastern State Trail with the Huron Sunrise Trail.
