= Alpena and Northern Railroad =

Railroad in Michigan

- The company's line from Alpena to Hawks. Not shown: the short-lived extension to Lake Jackson

Overview
- Dates of operation: 1893–1895
- Successor: Detroit and Mackinac Railway

Technical
- Track gauge: 1,435 mm (4 ft 8 1/2 in)
- Track length: 68.7 miles (110.6 km)

The Alpena and Northern Railroad (A&N) is a defunct railroad which operated briefly in northern Michigan during the 1890s.

The company incorporated on July 28, 1893, with the intention of building an 85-mile (137 km) line from Alpena to Mackinaw City, on the south shore of the Straits of Mackinac. On November 18 of that same year the company opened a line from Alpena to LaRocque (now Hawks), for a total length of 35 miles (56 km). In Alpena, the railroad used the Detroit, Bay City and Alpena Railroad's station on the north bank of the Thunder Bay River. In 1894, the Alpena and Northern extended its line another 28.6 miles (46.0 km) southwest from LaRocque into Montmorency County.

On April 16, 1895, the A&N was bought by the Detroit and Mackinac Railway and ceased to exist as an independent company. Its original main line between Alpena and LaRocque became part of the D&M's Northern Division, which reached Cheboygan in 1904. The section of the original mainline southwest of LaRocque, known variously as the Valentine Branch or Jackson Lake Branch after its acquisition by the D&M, was abandoned south of Hurst in 1903 as the logging industry moved on to other areas. The D&M abandoned the remainder of that branch in 1923.

The Lake State Railway, successor to the D&M, abandoned the line in its entirety in the early 2000s.
