= SS Cedarville =

Great lakes self-unloading wrecked in a collision

Coordinates: 45°47′08″N 84°40′08″W

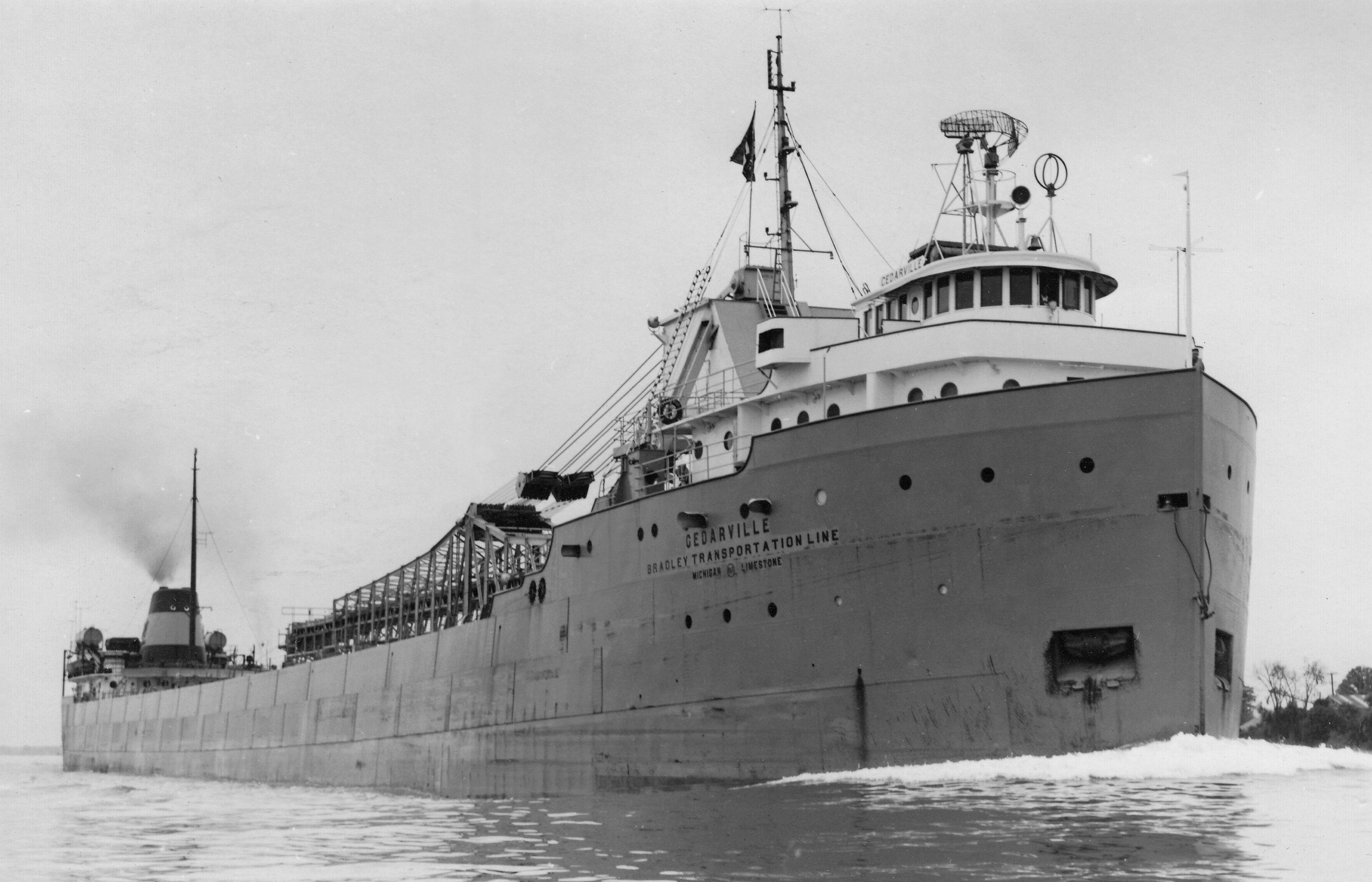
- Cedarville underway

History

United States
- Name: SS A.F. Harvey (1927–1957); SS Cedarville (1956–1965)
- Owner: Pittsburgh Steamship Company (1927–1956); US Steel (1956–1965)
- Builder: Great Lakes Engineering Works
- Launched: 9 April 1927
- In service: 1927
- Out of service: 1965
- Fate: Sank after collision 7 May 1965

General characteristics
- Tonnage: 8,575 GRT
- Length: 588.3 ft (179.3 m)
- Beam: 60.2 ft (18.3 m)
- Height: 30.8 ft (9.4 m)
- Crew: 35

SS Cedarville was a bulk carrier that carried limestone on the Great Lakes in the mid-20th century until it sank after a collision with another ship, MV Topdalsfjord on May 7, 1965.

== Service history ==
Cedarville was built in 1927 by the Great Lakes Engineering Works in River Rouge, Michigan. The ship was launched as SS A.F. Harvey, and entered service for the Pittsburgh Steamship Company division of US Steel. The following year, she received slight damage when she collided with the whaleback steamer John Ericsson in heavy fog. In 1956, the ship was transferred to the Bradley Transportation Company, still owned by US Steel. As part of the transfer, the ship was converted to be a self-unloading vessel and was renamed Cedarville in honor of a port she frequently visited. She was a fleet mate of the SS Carl D. Bradley.

== Final Journey ==
The SS Cedarville left Port Calcite at 5:01 a.m. with a crew of 35 men. She was travelling between Rogers City, Michigan and Gary, Indiana with a load of 14,411 long tons (14,642 t) of open-hearth limestone. Her captain, Martin Joppich, had gotten the position the previous year. Elmer Fleming, one of the two survivors from the SS Carl D. Bradley shipwreck, had been scheduled to command the Cedarville when she came out of winter lay-up in 1964. On March 27, 1964, Fleming had boarded the ship, but left a few minutes later. He never sailed again. There was speculation that the bad weather that day caused traumatic memories of his previous shipwreck to resurface. Ed Brewster, who had served as a wheelsman under Fleming, stated that he was "a real nervous person."

Fleming's sudden departure allowed many deck personnel to move up in position, including the promotion of first mate Martin Joppich to captain. In the early morning hours of May 7, third mate Charles Cook had left the SS W F White to join the crew of the Cedarville. Since he had more seniority, current third mate Len Gabrysiak was demoted to wheelsman. Wheelsman Ed Brewster was bumped down to watchman.

As the Cedarville continued on her upbound course, the dense fog worsened. Due to conditions of low visibility, two ships had grounded near the Soo Locks and the J E Upson had crashed into the Gray's Reef Lighthouse. Despite this, Captain Joppich maintained top speed of about 12.3 mph. Headed for the busy Straits of Mackinac, the Cedarville made radio contact with the Benson Ford. Through radio communication and whistle blasts, they were able to plan and execute a successful port-to-port passing arrangement.

Third mate Cook was monitoring his radar screen for approaching ships. Captain Joppich attempted radio contact with the nearest one. Captain Werner May of the MV Weissenburg responded. The captains agreed on a port-to-port passing arrangement. Captain May then advised Joppich that another ship was directly ahead of his, and they would encounter her shortly. Captain Gilbert of the George M Steinbrenner, directly ahead of the Cedarville, contacted Captain Joppich. Gilbert cautioned him about the approaching Topdalsfjord, stating that she had "nearly run us down a few minutes ago."

In the pilothouse, Cook watched the radar as the ships neared one another. Wheelsman Gabrysiak was following a series of course changes ordered by the captain, who was attempting to radio the other ship. Joppich ordered the engine room to slow ahead. Cook told the other two men in the pilothouse that they were about to get hit. Deck watchman Ivan Trafelet, who was serving as lookout on the portside, yelled, "There she is!" Gabrysiak saw the bow come out of the fog. They attempted to avoid the collision by putting the wheel hard left, but it was too late.

== Collision ==
One mile (1.6 km) east of the Mackinac Bridge, Cedarville collided with the Norwegian ship MV Topdalsfjord as a result of miscommunication between the two ships. Both changed course a mile away from each other, with Topdalsfjord's captain, Rasmus Haaland, steering his ship on a course that would lead to the two vessels passing each other on their starboard sides. Haaland claimed that he had also been attempting radio contact, and that their intentions had been broadcast. When it became apparent that collision was unavoidable, he ordered the engines to emergency full reverse.

The captain of Cedarville, however, intended for his vessel to cross the bow of Topdalsfjord. His message stating such was not received by Topdalsfjord. Although the engine was put in reverse, momentum carried her forward into Cedarville's port side. The collision caused only superficial damage above the waterline of the Cedarville, consisting mainly of broken railings and deck plates. However, there was significant damage below the waterline. The bow of Topdalsfjord, which was reinforced for working in ice, had created a large hole in Cedarville's hull below near the seventh hatch. The number two cargo hold quickly began to flood.

Captain Joppich rang the engine room to stop the engine and ordered Gabrysiak to sound the general alarm. Then he got on the radio to issue a mayday. Joppich unsuccessfully attempted to reach Joseph Parilla, the director of Marine Operations at U.S. Steel. The Cedarville dropped her anchor. Gabrysiak asked for permission to leave his post at the wheel to get lifejackets. Along the way, he had a fleeting conversation with another wheelsman, Stanley Haske. When Gabrysiak returned to the pilothouse with three lifejackets, he quickly put his on. Joppich and Cook placed theirs on the floor.

The impact of the collision woke Ed Brewster. Another sleeping crewman, watchman Bob Bingle, had been awoken by Art Furman right before impact. Furman informed Bingle of their situation. Bingle quickly put his lifejacket on and went up to the deck. Brewster and Bingle joined first mate Harry Piechan on deck. The men tried to cover the hole with the collision tarp, but the gash was too large.

== Sinking ==
Within minutes of the collision, a list to the port had developed. In the engine room, chief engineer F. Donald Lamp and his assistant, W. Tulgetske, began pumping out water. Captain Joppich then ordered water to be pumped into the starboard ballast tanks to counteract the list. Joppich radioed the Weissenberg to ask for the name of the other ship in the collision.

Captain May, convinced that the Cedarville was sinking and would need assistance, had been following her since the collision. He had already ordered his men into lifeboats that he was waiting to lower. Captain May asked if they needed help. Joppich refused the offer. May told his men to get out of the boats, but leave them ready to launch. Joppich once again attempted contact with Parilla. As the men talked, a decision was made to beach the Cedarville. The anchor was pulled up with a great deal of difficulty, as it had gotten hung up in the bottom.

Third Mate Cook plotted a course that would take Cedarville to a sandy beach 4.3 miles from the collision site. As the ship moved towards land, the weight of the water within the hull forced the bow down. Joppich, realizing they would not make it to the intended beaching spot, ordered the engines stopped. He called Mayday, which was heard by the crew of the Weissenberg. Captain May ordered his crew back into the lifeboats.

Captain Joppich told some of the men on the Cedarville to prepare to abandon ship. As the seas washed over the decks, the men rushed to the lifeboats and life rafts. Ed Brewster, on the starboard lifeboat, reached out to help stokerman Eugene "Casey" Jones get onto the raft. As their fingers touched, a huge wave appeared and swept Jones away.

The lifeboats were swung out, awaiting for the order to abandon ship. The order was never given. At 10:25 a.m., Cedarville rolled to her starboard side and sank. She had travelled only 2.3 miles from the collision site, a full 2 miles from the site where they intended to beach her.

== Rescue ==
All survivors of the collision, in which ten out of the 35 aboard died, were picked up by the German freighter MV Weissenburg, and subsequently transferred to the US Coast Guard cutter Mackinaw.

=== Inquiry into sinking ===
A U.S. Coast Guard inquiry into the incident found that the captain of Cedarville was at fault for the sinking and was charged with four counts of faulty seamanship. He initially pleaded innocent, but in August 1965 changed his plea to guilty. His license was suspended for a year as a result of the inquiry.

== Wreck site ==
The wreck of Cedarville lies in two halves, in the Straits of Mackinac Shipwreck Preserve in water around 110 feet (34 m) deep, although the highest point of the hull is around 35 feet (11 m) below the surface and the cabins of the ship are around 75 feet (23 m) underwater. Expert divers are able to enter the ship, as most parts remain fairly undamaged. It is not recommended for those with less experience, as three divers have lost their lives at the site. Cedarville is the fourth-largest ship lost on the Great Lakes after Edmund Fitzgerald, Daniel J. Morrell and fleet mate Carl D. Bradley.

== Bibliography ==
- Stonehouse, Frederick (2006). Steel on the Bottom. Gwinn: Avery Color Studios, Inc. ISBN 978-1-892384-35-5.
- Mixter, Ric (2009). The Wheelsmen. Saginaw: Airworthy Productions.ISBN 978-0-615-33540-7
- Cox, Stephen L. (2005). The Cedarville Conspiracy: Indicting U.S. Steel. University of Michigan Press. ISBN 0-472-03063-9
- Ratigan, William (1977). Great Lakes Shipwrecks & Survivals. Grand Rapids: Wm. B. Eerdman Publishing Company. ISBN 0802870104.
- Schumacher, Michael (2008). The Wreck of the Carl D: A True Story of Loss, Survival, and Rescue at Sea. New York: Bloomsbury. ISBN 9781596914841.
