= Oglebay Norton Corporation =

Former ore mining company

The Oglebay Norton Corporation was an ore mining company and operated lake freighters on the Great Lakes. At one point their flagship was the SS Edmund Fitzgerald through their Columbia Transportation Division.

== History ==
The company's roots go back to 1851, when Hewitt & Tuttle, an iron ore brokerage, formed a shipping subsidiary. After several mergers over the years, the firm became Oglebay, Norton in 1890, named for Earl Oglebay and David Z. Norton. In the 1890s, Oglebay, Norton and Company acted as the sales and shipping agent for Rockefeller's Lake Superior Consolidated Iron Mines. The company was incorporated in 1924. Oglebay Norton was acquired by Carmeuse Lime & Stone, Inc. in 2008.

House flag used by Oglebay Norton Corporation

House flag used by Columbia Transportation Division of the Oglebay Norton Company

An additional ship name flag used alongside the house flag, this design belonged to SS Edmund Fitzgerald.

Chronological Company Timeline

- 1854: H.B. Tuttle & Co., predecessor to Oglebay Norton, created as a two-partner iron ore agency.
- 1855: John D. Rockefeller hired at $3.50 a week. Quits later over salary dispute.
- 1884: New partnership formed when Wheeling, West Virginia, industrialist Earl W. Oglebay joins firm.
- 1890: Cleveland banker David Z. Norton joins; Oglebay, Norton & Co. formed.
- 1890: Company starts to manage Rockefeller's ore properties on the Mesabi Range in Minnesota.
- 1921: Company assembles its first Great Lakes shipping fleet with 11 freighters, which became the Columbia Steamship Company.
- 1930s: Company began to manage four docks along the Great Lakes.
- 1931: Columbia Steamship Company. renamed the Columbia Transportation Company
- 1939: Company initiated a study of low-grade minerals and established the Reserve Mining Company to develop taconite.
- 1957: Company adopted the name Oglebay Norton Company and began trading publicly.
- 1960s: Company established taconite mine in Eveleth, Minnesota.
- 1975: Oglebay-leased ship, the Edmund Fitzgerald, sinks in Lake Superior. Ship owned by Northwestern Mutual Insurance Company.
- February 1998: John Lauer takes over as CEO; stock is around $40; company has $52 million in debt. He completes half-dozen acquisitions in first 18 months, pushing company into limestone business.
- June 1998: Debt rises to more than $300 million.
- April 1998: Stock reaches all-time high, $50.50.
- 2000: Company buys Michigan Limestone Operations (MLO) and Jebco Abrasives; MLO executive Michael Lundin begins rise at Oglebay.
- October 2001: Company stopped paying dividends to shareholders.
- November 2001: Lundin named president.
- 2002: Recession and weak construction market pummel stock to $3. Debt rises to more than $400 million. Lundin becomes CEO.
- January 2004: Company misses bond interest payment.
- February 2004: Oglebay files for Chapter 11 bankruptcy protection. Week later, stock falls to less than $1, delisted from Nasdaq stock exchange.
- November 2004: Bankruptcy court approves reorganization plan.
- January 2005: Company exits bankruptcy after reorganizing finances and reducing debt to $275 million.
- August 2006: Last three freighters sold to another Great Lakes shipper; Oglebay to concentrate on limestone and lime.
- July 2007: Harbinger Capital Partners launches $31-a-share hostile takeover. Oglebay adopts anti-takeover plan.
- September 2007: Oglebay says it has multiple proposals to buy the company for more than Harbinger's bid.
- October 2007: Subsidiary of Belgian-based Carmeuse Group, global producer of lime, agrees to buy Oglebay for $36 a share, or $520 million.
- November 2007: Oglebay shareholders approve merger with Carmeuse.
- February 8, 2008: Announcement that Carmeuse has antitrust approval to buy Oglebay.

== See also ==
- Michigan Limestone and Chemical Company
