= Saginaw Bay Southern Railway =

Overview
- Headquarters: Saginaw, Michigan
- Reporting mark: SBS
- Locale: Michigan
- Dates of operation: 2005–2012
- Predecessor: former CSX Transportation lines
- Successor: Lake State Railway

Technical
- Track gauge: 4 ft 8 1/2 in (1,435 mm) standard gauge

Saginaw Bay Southern (reporting mark SBS) was a shortline railroad operating in the lower peninsula of Michigan. The railroad was a subsidiary of Lake State Railway until the two companies merged in 2012. It interchanged with CSX Transportation in Mount Morris, Michigan, the Huron and Eastern Railway in Saginaw, Michigan and Midland, Michigan and the Mid-Michigan Railroad in Paines, Michigan.

On October 29, 2005, Saginaw Bay Southern began leasing over 67 miles of CSX Transportation trackage. The routes taken over from CSX include the Dean Subdivision (Saginaw to Midland), the Bay City Subdivision (Saginaw to Bay City), and the Saginaw Subdivision from Mount Morris to Saginaw.

In late 2011, it was announced that the SBS will be merged with Lake State, with LSRC being the surviving company. The merger was strictly for railway accounting purposes. Following the news of the merger, Lake State has stopped painting the Saginaw Bay Southern logo on its locomotives. Lake State now operates the railroad as "Lake State Railway doing business as Saginaw Bay Southern Railway".
