= Bradley Transportation Company =

American shipping company

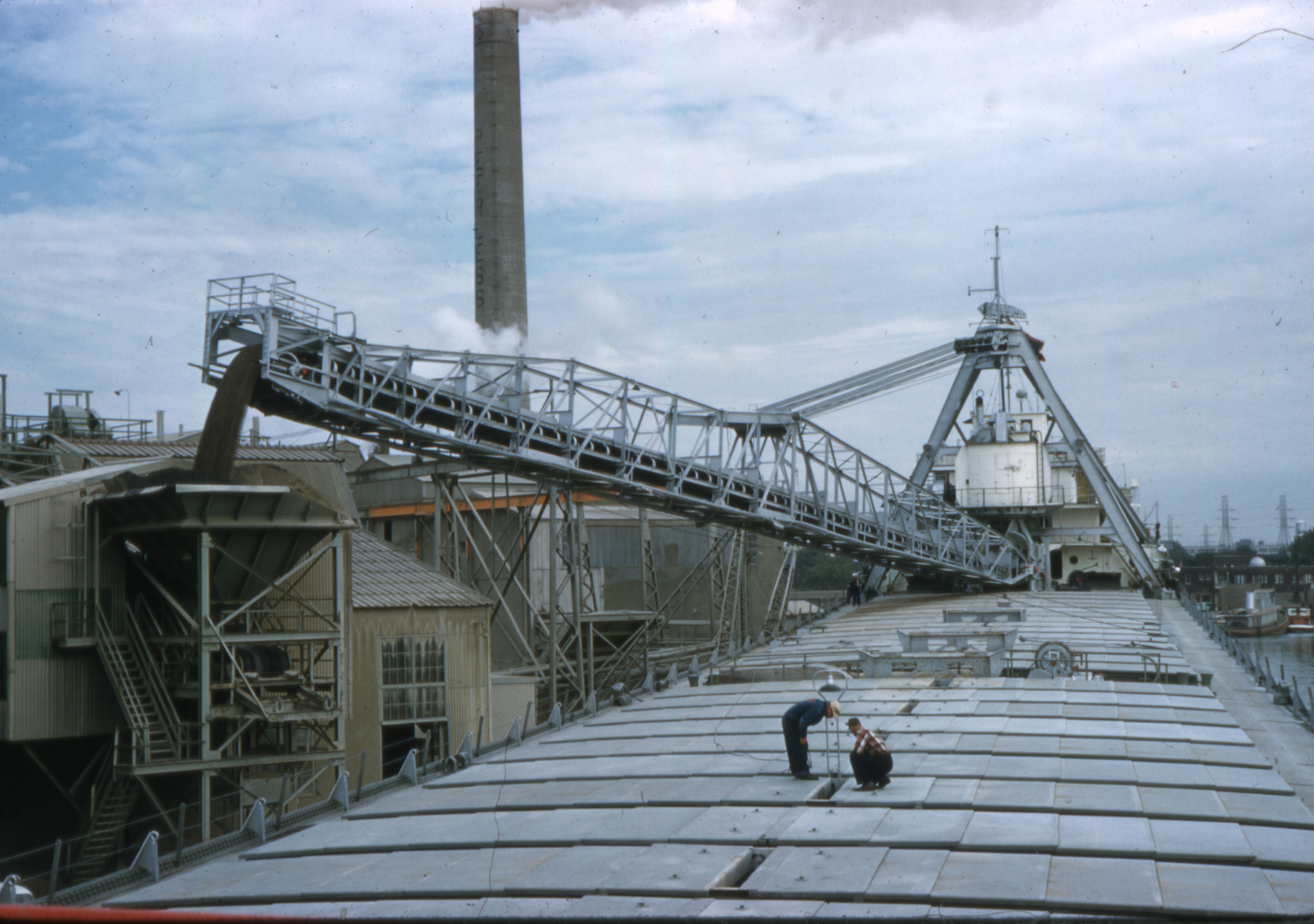
- Type: Subsidiary of Michigan Limestone
- Industry: Shipping
- Founded: 1912; 114 years ago
- Defunct: 1981; 45 years ago
- Headquarters: Rogers City, Michigan,
- Area served: Great Lakes
- Key people: Carl D. Bradley (President)
- Parent: United States Steel Corporation

The Bradley Transportation Company, was an American shipping company that was a subsidiary of the Michigan Limestone and Chemical Company and handled its shipment of limestone to its parent company U.S. Steel. It boasted a large fleet of self-unloading lakers that were ordered specifically for the company. The Bradley Trans Co. was later merged with the U.S. Steel Great Lakes Fleet during the early 1980s.

== Fleet ==
Bradley fleet
image	name	launch date	retired	notes
	SS Calcite	1912	1960	Scrapped in 1961.; pilot house preserved and moved to 40 mile point lighthouse
	SS W. F. White	1915	1976	Sold to Reoch Transports in 1976 and renamed Erindale.; Scrapped in 1984.
	SS Irvin L. Clymer	1917	1990	Originally named Carl D. Bradley. Renamed John G. Munson in 1927. Again renamed to Irvin L. Clymer in 1951; Scrapped in 1994.; Pilothouse sits at the Azcon dock in Duluth Minnesota
	SS Rogers City	1923	1981	Originally named SS B. H. Taylor; Scrapped in 1988.
	SS T. W. Robinson	1925	1982	Scrapped in 1987; first turbo electric lake freighter
	SS Carl D. Bradley	1927	1958	Sank in storm 1958; Biggest Ship on the lakes until the construction of the Wilfred Sykes in 1949
	SS Cedarville	1927	1965	Originally Named A.F. Harvey; Transferred from the Pittsburg steamship Co. and given a self unloader in 1956; Sank after collision 1965
	SS John G. Munson	1952	present	Repowered 2016
(In her grand river navigation days)	M/V Calcite II	1929	2011	As the William G. Clyde she was transferred from the Pittsburg steamship Co. and given a self unloader in 1960; Repowered 1961; Sold to Grand River Navigation in 2001 and renamed Maumee; Scrapped 2011
The Taylor (left) in her Pittsburg Steamship Co. configuration	M/V Myron C. Taylor	1929	2007	Transferred from the Pittsburg steamship Co. and given a self unloader in 1956; Repowered 1968; Sold to Grand River Navigation in 2001 and renamed Calumet; Collided with a harbor wall, this event would lead to her being scrapped
The Sloan as the Mississagi	SS George A. Sloan	1943	2023	Transferred from the Pittsburg steamship Co. and given a self unloader in 1967; Sold to lower lakes towing in 2001 and renamed Missisagi; As of 2023 scrapping was underway

== See also ==
- American River Transportation Company
