= SS Carl D. Bradley =

Self-unloading Great Lakes freighter that sank in a Lake Michigan storm

Coordinates: 45.559167°N 85.987778°W

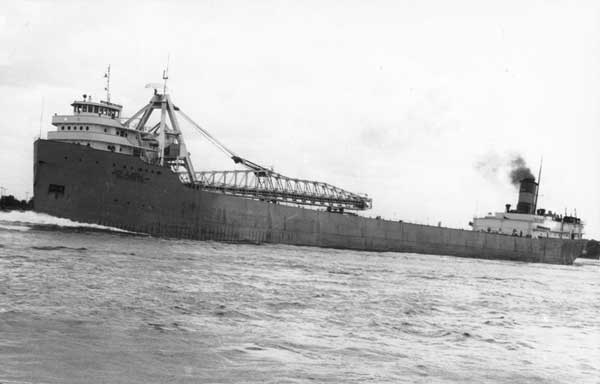
- SS Carl D. Bradley

History

United States
- Name: Carl D. Bradley
- Owner: Bradley Transportation Company Duluth, Minnesota 1927–1952; United States Steel Corporation Cleveland, Ohio 1952–1958
- Operator: Bradley Transportation Company 1927–1952; United States Steel Corporation 1952–1958
- Port of registry: (United States) New York City
- Builder: American Ship Building Company, Lorain, Ohio
- Yard number: 00797
- Launched: April 9, 1927
- Christened: July 28, 1927
- Completed: mid-1927
- Maiden voyage: July 27–28, 1927
- In service: July 28, 1927
- Out of service: November 18, 1958
- Identification: Registry number US 226776
- Nickname(s): Carl D.
- Fate: Sank in a storm on November 18, 1958

General characteristics
- Type: Self-unloading lake freighter
- Tonnage: 10,028 GRT
- Length: 639 ft (194.8 m)
- Beam: 65.2 ft (19.9 m)
- Depth: 30.2 ft (9.2 m)
- Installed power: 4,800 hp (3,600 kW)
- Propulsion: General Electric high and low pressure steam turbines turning electric motors to a single fixed pitch propeller
- Speed: 14–16 mph (23–26 km/h)
- Capacity: 14,000 t (stone) 12,000 t (coal) largest cargo 18,114 t (stone)
- Crew: 35
- Notes: Second vessel to carry this name. The first SS Carl D. Bradley was renamed SS John G. Munson in 1927 and SS Irvin L. Clymer in 1951.

SS Carl D. Bradley was an American self-unloading Great Lakes freighter that sank in a Lake Michigan storm on November 18, 1958. Of the 35 crew members, 33 died in the sinking. Twenty-three were from the port town of Rogers City, Michigan, United States. Her sinking was likely caused by structural failure from the brittle steel used in her construction as well as extensive use throughout her 31-year career.

Built in 1927 by the American Ship Building Company in Lorain, Ohio, Carl D. Bradley was owned by the Michigan Limestone division of U.S. Steel, and operated by the Bradley Transportation Company. She retained the title of "Queen of the Lakes" for 22 years as the longest and largest freighter on the Great Lakes.

== History ==
=== Design and construction ===
Bradley Transportation Company's fleet of self-unloading ships was used to haul limestone from the Michigan Limestone quarry in Rogers City, Michigan. Carl D. Bradley was built to meet Michigan Limestone's lucrative contract with a cement firm in Gary, Indiana. By seven feet (2.1 meters), she was longer than the second largest ship on the Great Lakes and her engine had almost twice the power of engines installed in most lake freighters. At 639 feet (195 m), she was the longest freighter (and the largest self-unloader) on the lakes for 22 years. Later the AA class of U.S. Steel-owned freighters was roughly the same size as Carl D. Bradley but shorter in length by just inches. Carl D. Bradley retained the title "Queen of the Lakes" until the launch of the 678-foot (207 m) SS Wilfred Sykes in 1949.

Carl D. Bradley began as hull 797 in 1923 at the American Ship Building Company in Lorain, Ohio, where she was launched on April 9, 1927. She was outfitted with her fore and aft housing in the ensuing months until her maiden voyage, when her namesake Carl David Bradley, the president of Michigan Limestone; Bradley's wife; the Rogers City community band; and hundreds of Rogers City residents greeted her as she steamed into Calcite Harbor on July 28, 1927. Bradley declared that the new ship was "the last word in freighter construction."

The United States Coast Guard (USCG) described Carl D. Bradley's design and construction as:

... [a] typical arrangement for self-unloading type vessels with a forepeak and large cargo area, and having propulsion machinery aft. These areas were separated by two transverse watertight bulkheads, the collision bulkhead at frame 12 and the engine room forward bulkhead at frame 173. The cargo hold space was divided into five compartments by screen bulkheads above the tunnel and the unloading machinery was located in the conveyor room just forward of the cargo spaces. The entire 475 foot length of the cargo spaces was open longitudinally through the tunnel and conveyor room.

As the flagship of Bradley Transportation Company, Carl D. Bradley often carried corporate officials and guests in her staterooms. She received more attention than the other ships in the fleet, with her gray and red paint always fresh, her decks freshly hosed down, and a larger crew. She had individual rooms for the captain, chief mates, chief steward, and engine room officers. The rest of the crew was housed in comfortable dormitory style rooms. She had a "state-of-the-art" galley with huge refrigeration units and storage pantries. Her engine room housed a huge generator powered by two Foster-Wheeler boilers. Carl D. Bradley was the only fully electric ship in the Bradley Transportation fleet; her generator powered everything from the propeller to the running lights.

=== Career ===
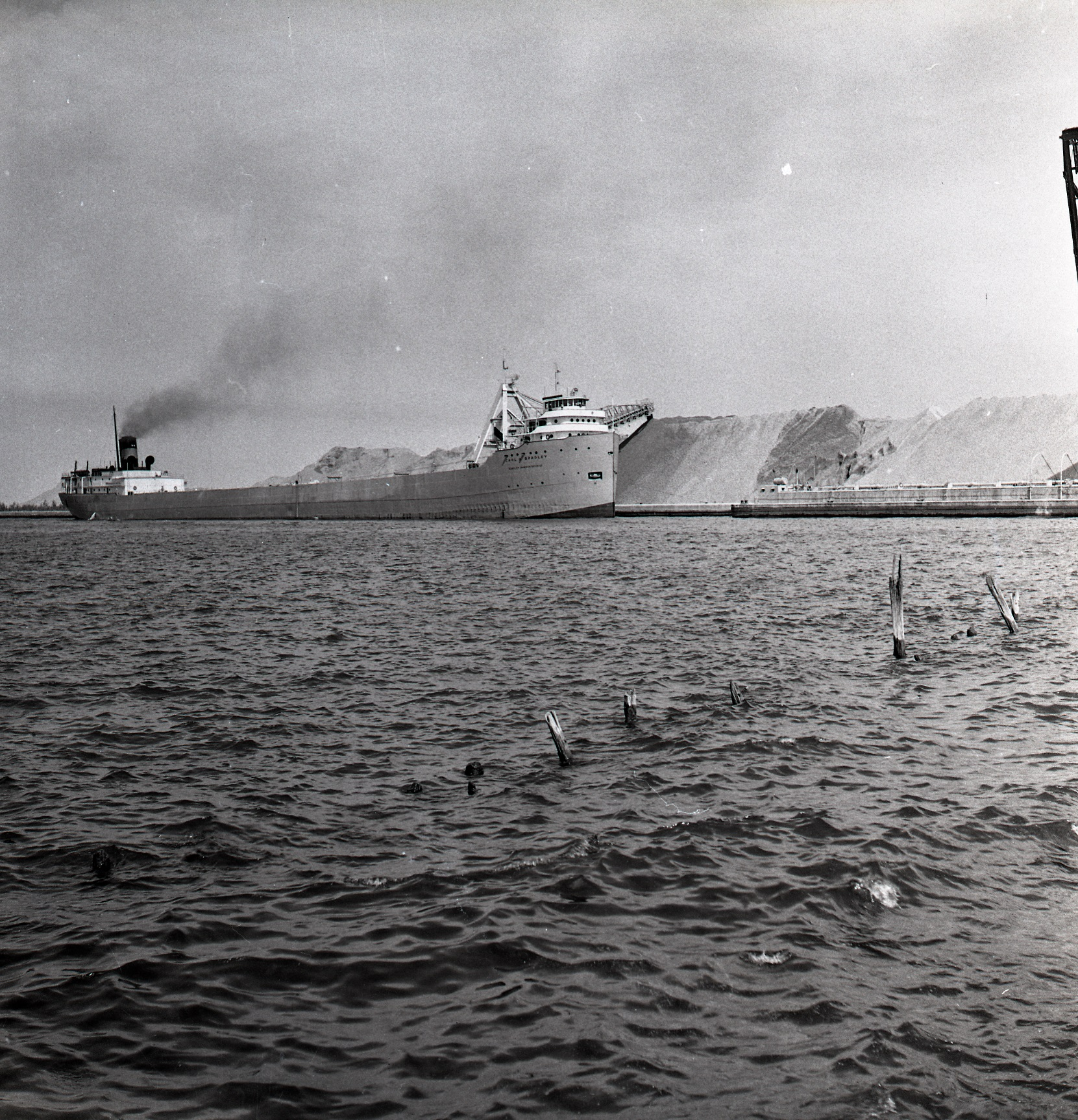
Carl D. Bradley unloading stone at Buffington Harbor in Gary, IN in June, 1949

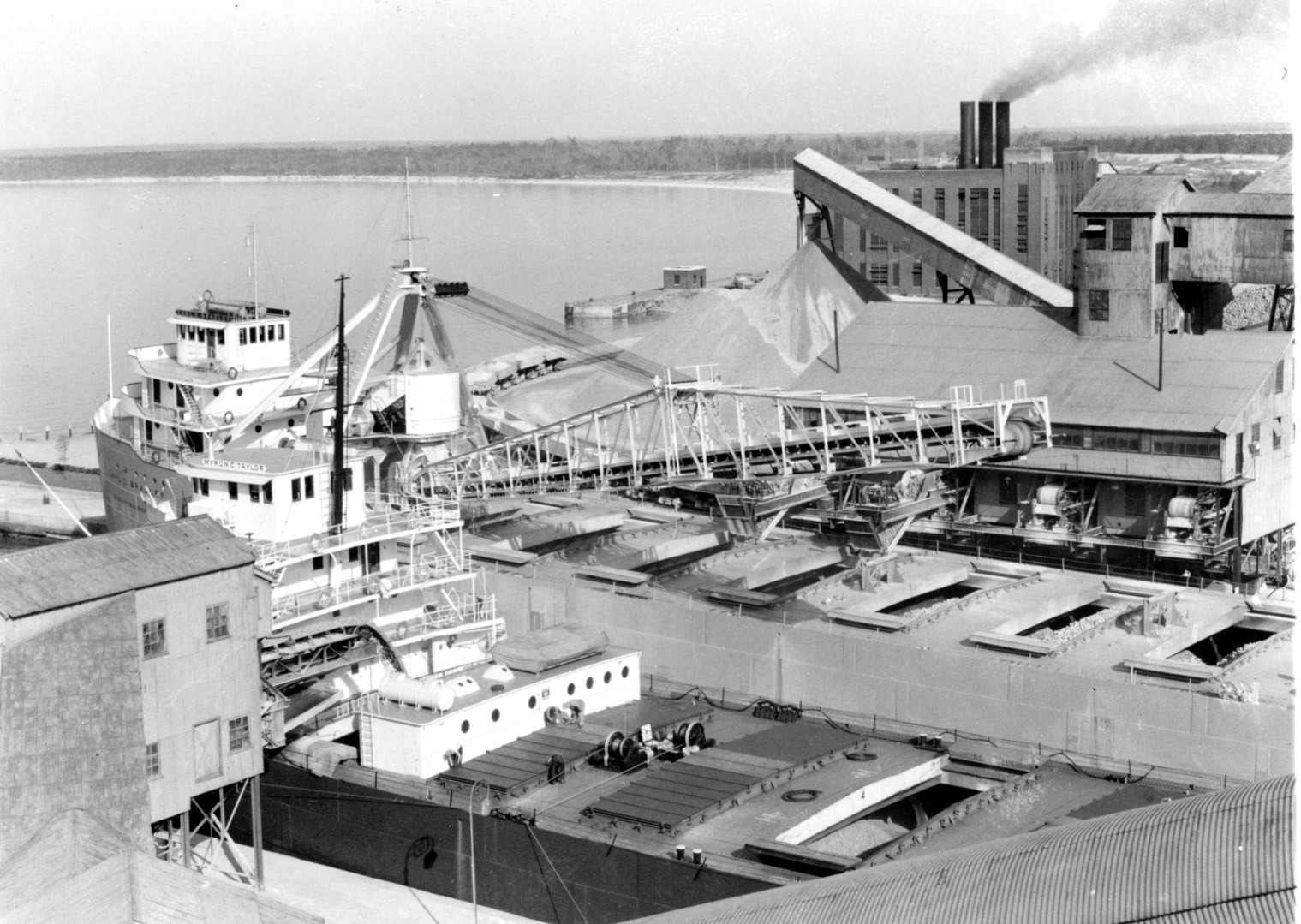
Carl D. Bradley (2) and Myron C. Taylor at Michigan Limestone

Carl D. Bradley's registered port was New York City; however, her true base of operations was Rogers City, where Michigan Limestone was based. The Bradley Transportation fleet was predominantly crewed by men from Rogers City. Many of the crew were friends, neighbors, or familial relatives. As the boats often departed and returned every few days, many of the crew made their homes and raised their families in Rogers City.

During her career, Carl D. Bradley carried different grades of limestone from Lake Huron to deepwater ports on Lakes Michigan and Erie and occasionally Lake Superior. She set new records in stone trade, carrying her largest cargo in 1929 when she loaded with 18,114 long tons (20,288 short tons; 18,405 t) of limestone, a cargo that would require 300 railroad cars to move. She was the first lake freighter to pass through the new MacArthur Lock at the Soo Locks in 1943.

As the largest ship on the lakes, Carl D. Bradley was traditionally the first boat through the Straits of Mackinac when the ice kept the smaller vessels from leaving port. She served as an icebreaker. Her forepeak was filled with concrete; she would break ice to Indiana, and then go to the Lorain shipyard for replacement of broken plates before starting her season.

Carl D. Bradley sustained damage in a collision with MV White Rose on the St. Clair River on April 3, 1957. She was in dry dock in Chicago for seven days in May 1957 for major repairs to her hull. Carl D. Bradley had two groundings while proceeding out of Cedarville, Michigan, one in the spring of 1958 and the other in November 1958, the latter of which required repairs. These groundings were not reported to the USCG, which would later consider whether the groundings caused hull stresses that contributed to Carl D. Bradley's sinking. The USCG noted that although Bradley Transportation received an award for 2,228,775 injury-free man hours from April 24, 1955, to December 31, 1957, while operating Carl D. Bradley, the company's focus was industrial safety rather than material safety of the vessel. Since the company's founding in 1912, it had never lost a ship until loss of Carl D. Bradley.

Although Carl D. Bradley was normally one of the busiest ships in the Bradley fleet, she was laid up from July 1 to October 1, 1958, due to a downturn in the steel industry. She made only 43 round trips in the 1958 shipping season. Carl D. Bradley was scheduled for repairs in Manitowoc, Wisconsin, when she laid up over the winter. Her owner, Bradley Transportation, a U.S. Steel subsidiary, planned an $800,000 replacement of her rusting cargo hold and bulkheads. A common joke among her crew was that she was being held together by her rust. Sailors reported that they picked up sheared off rivets by the bucketful following storms due to Carl D. Bradley's excessive twisting and bending in heavy weather.

The USCG conducted an annual inspection of Carl D. Bradley on April 17, 1958, and found her seaworthy. On October 30, 1958, the USCG found no problems during a safety inspection of Carl D. Bradley that included a fire and boat drill.

=== Final voyage ===
Carl D. Bradley met her fate on November 18, 1958, while en route to Rogers City. The previous day, she had completed what was initially supposed to be her last voyage of the 1958 season, which she completed with the delivery of a cargo of crushed stone at Gary, Indiana. After leaving Gary, Carl D. Bradley set course for Manitowoc, where she was due to spend her winter layup in dry dock and was to have a new cargo hold fitted. She departed Gary empty on her final voyage on November 17 at 10:00 p.m. with 9,000 US gallons (34,000 L; 7,500 imp gal) in her ballast tanks for stability. However, when Carl D. Bradley was only a few hours from Manitowoc, she received an order from U.S. Steel to return to Calcite Harbor, as they had scheduled her to deliver another load of stone at the last minute.

The winds were 22 to 30 knots (25 to 35 mph; 41 to 56 km/h) at the start of her trip. The weather forecast was a gale with 43 to 56 knots (49 to 64 mph; 80 to 104 km/h) southerly winds changing to southwest. Carl D. Bradley's path would take her into a lethal storm that was the result of two separate weather patterns merging. A line of thirty tornadoes extended from Illinois to Texas; more than one foot (0.30 m) of snow fell on North and South Dakota; nearly 2 feet (0.61 m) of snow fell in Wyoming; Nevada's temperatures plummeted to below freezing; and Tucson, Arizona, had a record 6.4-inch (160 mm) snowfall.

Captain Roland Bryan was known as a "heavy weather captain" who took pride in delivering his cargo on time. Bryan's usual course up Lake Michigan was quicker and ran closer to the Michigan shore. On November 18, he avoided the brunt of the building seas by instead traveling 4.3 to 10.4 nautical miles (4.9 to 12.0 mi; 8.0 to 19.3 km) along the lee of the Wisconsin shore. He planned a course with his first and second mate that would take them to Cana Island, then turn at Lansing Shoal near the Beaver Island group. Although the seas gathered strength from the southwest, they were not considered severe and the ship was riding smoothly. However, there is evidence that regardless of his reputation, Bryan likely had his doubts concerning how well the 31-year-old vessel could manage in rough seas. Not long before Carl D. Bradley's loss, he stated in a letter to a friend that he was well aware that the ship was not in the best condition structurally and should not be out in bad weather. He also expressed in the letter that he was relieved that Carl D. Bradley was slated to receive a new cargo hold during her winter lay-up in Manitowoc.

Two ships were running parallel with Carl D. Bradley when she passed Milwaukee, Wisconsin, at 4:00 a.m. on November 18. She reduced her speed sometime prior to 4:00 p.m. to 12 to 13 knots (14 to 15 mph; 22 to 24 km/h). By 4:00 p.m, she was past Poverty Island with Bryan in charge of navigation and the first mate on watch. Winds were storm force from the southwest at 52 to 56 knots (60 to 64 mph; 96 to 104 km/h). Carl D. Bradley was "riding comfortably with a heavy following sea slightly on the starboard quarter." At 5:35 p.m., the ship was about 10 nautical miles (12 mi; 19 km) southwest of Gull Island. At this moment, a loud thud was heard followed by a vibration. The first mate turned aft and saw the stern of the vessel sagging. Bryan slammed the engine's telegraph to "stop engines" and sounded the alarm to abandon ship. As the ship broke in two, he shouted at the crew on deck to run and don their life jackets. The first mate managed to radio transmissions of mayday and give their position before the power lines aboard the ship were severed. The distress call was picked up by the USCG, amateur radio and commercial stations on land and sea.

Carl D. Bradley had one life raft stored in the bow section and two lifeboats stored in the stern section. The crew in the stern section attempted to lower the lifeboats. One lifeboat became entangled in cables and the other lifeboat dangled at an impossible angle for launching or boarding. The life raft was tossed clear of the wreck when the bow section sank. The four crew members who reached the life raft were repeatedly thrown off by the massive waves and only two survived.

The crew on the German cargo vessel Christian Sartori witnessed the sinking through their binoculars. They saw the lights go out on the fore part of the ship while the aft end of the ship remained lit. Then they saw the lights on the aft end go out so that the silhouette of the ship remained barely visible. A short time later they heard an explosion and saw a red, yellow and white column of flame and remnants shoot up in the air. They "concluded that the Bradley had exploded".

=== Search and rescue ===
After witnessing the explosion, Christian Sartori immediately altered course for Carl D. Bradley's location. However, the wind and waves were so fierce that it took her one and one-half hours to traverse the 4 miles (6.4 km) that separated the vessels. The Plum Island lifesaving station deployed a 36-foot (11 m) boat within minutes of the sinking. The crew was unable to steer or make any headway in the storm and was forced to seek the shelter of nearby Washington Island. The USCG Cutter Sundew went out from Charlevoix, Michigan, into the open lake in the pounding seas of an unremitting gale. She arrived at the search area at 10:40 p.m. on November 18, five hours after Carl D. Bradley sank. Coast Guard Station Charlevoix also launched a 36-foot (11 m) motor lifeboat in an attempt to reach Carl D. Bradley, but this was ordered back after being mercilessly tossed about on Lake Michigan. The USCG Cutter Hollyhock from Sturgeon Bay, Wisconsin, arrived on the search scene at 1:30 a.m. on November 19 after a seven-hour trip that her skipper described as "a visit to hell." During the night, friends and family members of Carl D. Bradley's crew drove from Rogers City and the surrounding towns to Charlevoix where any survivors would arrive. They kept vigil by lining the beach at Charlevoix with their car headlights turned on. Eight other commercial vessels joined the search at daybreak. USCG air and surface units searched for survivors throughout the following days.

At 8:37 a.m. on November 19, Sundew located Carl D. Bradley's forward life raft fifteen hours after the sinking and 15 nautical miles (17 mi; 28 km) from the disaster site. Two survivors were on the raft — First Mate Elmer H. Fleming, 43, and Deck Watchman Frank L. Mays, 26. Another crew member from Carl D. Bradley, Deck Watchman Gary Strzelecki, was also found alive, but died not long after being rescued. The two survivors said that they fired two of the three signal flares stored on the life raft not long after Carl D. Bradley sank. When they tried to fire the remaining flare, it was wet and would not fire when Christian Sartori passed within 100 yards (300 ft; 91 m) without seeing them. Mays reported that his cork-filled life jacket kept him buoyed but he had to hold it down just to keep it on due to the force of the waves. He knew that he had to find something to hold on to in order to survive.

During the day, Sundew and other vessels recovered seventeen more bodies, all wearing lifejackets. The bodies were brought to Charlevoix City Hall for family identification. More lifejackets were found laced up, indicating that they may have slipped off while they were worn. In all, of the 35 crewmen, 33 lost their lives. The bodies of the fifteen men not recovered remain missing to this day.

After the ice broke up in the spring of 1959, the United States Army Corps of Engineers located Carl D. Bradley's wreck using sonar equipment aboard MS Williams. The wreck was found 5 miles (8.0 km) northwest of Boulder Reef and just south of Gull Island lying at a depth of 60 to 62 fathoms (360 to 372 ft; 110 to 113 m). Later in 1959, Carl D. Bradley's owners, U.S. Steel, hired Los Angeles-based Global Marine Exploration Company to survey the wreck using the underwater television from the minisub Submarex. They concluded that the ship was lying in one piece. However, the two survivors continued to maintain that they saw Carl D. Bradley break in two. The U.S. Steel survey of the wreck was criticized because it was conducted in secrecy without impartial witnesses.

== Coast Guard investigation and recommendations ==
=== Investigation ===
The Coast Guard Marine Board of Investigation found that Carl D. Bradley sank from excessive hogging stresses. The Marine Board reported that four vessels were crossing Lake Michigan parallel or ahead of Carl D. Bradley during the storm and that eight other vessels sought shelter at the time of the casualty. They concluded that Bryan "exercised poor judgment" when he decided to leave the shelter of the Wisconsin shore and sail into the open lake during the storm. However, the Commandant of the USCG, Vice Admiral A.C. Richmond, issued his own report that disapproved the Marine Board's conclusion that Bryan used poor judgment. Richmond noted that his conclusion was supported by the vessel's 31-year history of Great Lakes navigation and the report that it was sailing smoothly prior to its sinking. His report also rejected that hogging stresses caused Carl D. Bradley to sink, instead concluding that she broke up due to "undetected structural weakness or defect."

Maritime historian Mark Thompson wrote that the type of steel used in the older vessels may have caused their structural failure:

After the Carl D. Bradley sank in 1958, Coast Guard technical experts were aware of the shortcomings of the notch-sensitive and brittle steel that was used to build many ships prior to 1948, but there doesn't seem to have been any program in place to warn the owners or crew of such vessels. That led to the loss of the SS Daniel J. Morrell in 1966, and may have been a factor in many other shipwrecks.

=== Recommendations ===
Following their investigation of the Carl D. Bradley sinking, the Marine Board made the following safety recommendations:

1. Mechanical changes should be made in the way lifeboats are disengaged and deployed.
2. A second life raft should be mandatory on Great Lakes cargo ships because they land upright no matter how they are overturned.
3. Each life boat should be equipped with two tow ropes (painters).
4. Six parachute-type flare signals with equipment for firing them skyward should be stored on each lifeboat and life raft.
5. The cork and canvas life vests should be updated to include crotch straps and collars to support the neck.

The Great Lakes shipping industry later replaced the rigid, open rafts like the one carried on Carl D. Bradley with inflatable life rafts with an enclosed canopy for protection against the elements.

In 1968, the National Transportation Safety Board (NTSB) gave notice to the USCG Commandant that the structural failure sustained by SS Edward Y. Townsend, Carl D. Bradley, and Daniel J. Morrell could recur under similar circumstances. The NTSB recommended that the USCG take action to implement a progressive structural renewal on ships constructed prior to 1948.

== Legal settlement ==
Carl D. Bradley's estimated value at the time her loss was $8 million, making her the most costly shipwreck in Great Lakes history. U.S. Steel initially offered $660,000 as a settlement. Family members of the lost crewmen felt that U.S. Steel used the USCG findings to avoid responsibility for the loss of Carl D. Bradley. The company believed that their 1959 survey results of the wreck supported their position that her loss was an "act of God".

Ten families filed lawsuits seeking more than $7 million just weeks after the USCG report was released. U.S. Steel reached a $1,250,000 lump sum settlement one year and sixteen days after the sinking. A commissioner was appointed to determine how the settlement money would be divided among the families. The settlement would not guarantee lifelong financial security to the victims' families. One published source said the settlement was "one of the fastest in maritime history for a case of its scope."

== Wreck observations ==
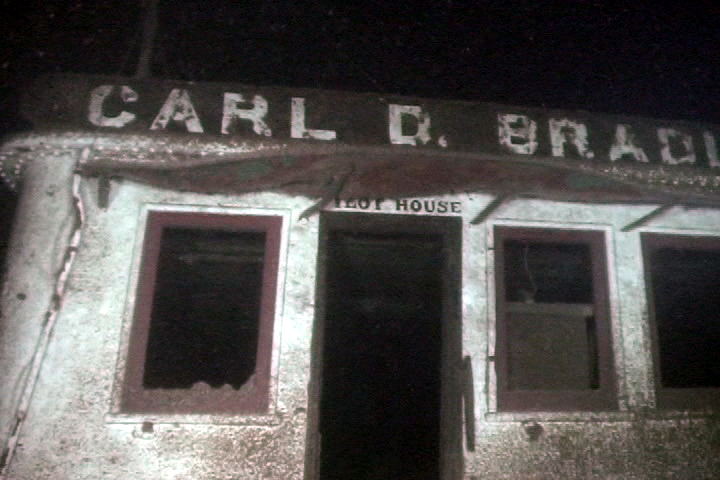
Carl D. Bradley's pilot house door in 2007

Jim Clary, marine author and artist, and Fred Shannon, maritime explorer, led two diving expeditions to the wreck with the goal of proving that the survivors' account that Carl D. Bradley broke apart was accurate. Survivor Frank Mays participated in both expeditions. The first expedition in 1995 was conducted with a submersible. It was unable to conclusively prove whether Carl D. Bradley broke apart due to poor visibility and weather conditions. However, "Mays, as the only survivor of the tragedy, placed a plaque on the wreck in memory of his fellow crewmen."

Clary, Shannon, and Mays conducted the second expedition in 1997 with a remotely operated underwater vehicle (ROV). They obtained underwater video film showing two sections of Carl D. Bradley sitting upright about 90 feet (27 m) apart at a depth of 320 to 380 feet (98 to 116 m). Forty years after Carl D. Bradley's sinking, Mays was able to view her hull from inside the submersible. He later wrote, "I saw it go down in two pieces on the surface and now I've seen it in two pieces on the bottom of Lake Michigan."

Carl D. Bradley's wreck lies in 310 to 380 feet (94 to 116 m) of water in a thermocline with a temperature of 39 °F (4 °C). A very high degree of technical skill and long decompression are required to dive this wreck. Mirek Standowicz made the first scuba dives to Carl D. Bradley in 2001. He videotaped the pilothouse for a documentary by Out of Blue Productions. His video recorded the glass blown out of the pilot house windows and the telegraph in the stop position.

Two Minnesota divers, John Janzen and John Scoles, spent months preparing to remove Carl D. Bradley's bell. They designed a special battery system and underwater torch and conducted practice dives in a flooded iron mine in Wisconsin. After obtaining the required permission from Michigan government agencies, Scoles and Janzen conducted three dives to Carl D. Bradley in August 2007. They removed the original bell and replaced it with a memorial bell of similar dimensions, engraved with the names of the lost crew. They were the first scuba divers to reach the stern of Carl D. Bradley, including long penetration dives inside the ship's engine room. Frank Mays was present on the surface during the dives and saw the bell for the first time in 49 years when it reached the surface. Scoles and Janzen along with divers Tracy Xelowski and Sue Smith also explored the region of the break between the bow and stern sections of the shipwreck.

== Legacy and memorial ==
Of the 35 crewmen, 33 died in the sinking; 23 were from Rogers City, Michigan, a town with 3,873 residents. Twenty-three women were widowed and fifty-three children became fatherless. Two wives of the crew were pregnant at the time of the disaster. A mass funeral service was held at St. Ignatius Catholic Church for nine of the recovered victims. Friends and relatives would nearly double the town's population during the funerals and memorial services. Rogers City's mayor issued an official proclamation declaring that every November 18 would be dedicated to the memory of the men lost on the ship. The Mariner's Church of Detroit, Michigan, offered special prayers for the vessel's sailors. Ships at sea dropped anchor at noon for memorial services for those lost on Carl D. Bradley.

The Detroit News established the "Carl D. Bradley Ship Disaster Fund" and contributed $1,000 to set it up. Donations came from across the country, ranging from Michigan Limestone's $10,000 contribution, to collections aboard commercial ships, to individual donations.

On August 9, 1997, a memorial in Rogers City's Lakeside Park was dedicated to the thirty-three men who lost their lives on Carl D. Bradley and Cedarville.

The bell from Carl D. Bradley was returned to Rogers City in 2007. It was restored and unveiled in a ceremony held on the weekend of the 49th anniversary of the sinking. On November 17, 2008, a 50th Anniversary Memorial was held at the Great Lakes Lore Maritime Museum in Rogers City when the bell was tolled to commemorate the crew. The documentary movie November Requiem premiered at the Rogers City Theater during the ceremonies. It used author Andrew Kantar's book, Black November, as a major source and focused on the repercussions on the small community of Rogers City after Carl D. Bradley sank. The documentary was featured on PBS in November 2008. In 2010, it won two Emmy Awards for best historical documentary and best original music score.

In 2019, Captain Andrew Stempki released a “songumentary” entitled "The Men Long Forgotten" that memorialized the wreck. Stempki is also creating a screenplay for a potential feature film.

== See also ==
- SS Edmund Fitzgerald, sank in 1975
- SS Daniel J. Morrell, sank in 1966
