= Alabaster Historic District =

Historic district in Michigan, United States

- U.S. National Register of Historic Places
- U.S. Historic district
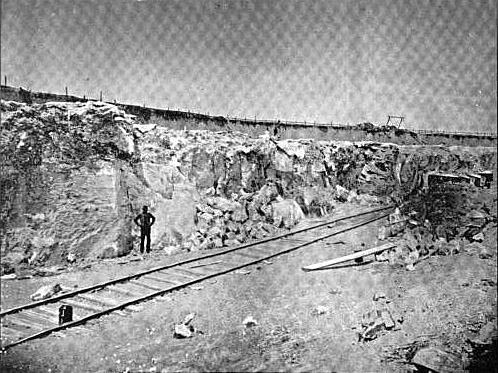
- Quarry, c. 1904

- Location within Michigan Location within the United States
- Interactive map
- Location: Bounded by Lake Huron, Gypsum, Keystone, and Rempert Rds., Alabaster, Michigan
- Coordinates: 44°11′12″N 83°34′4″W
- Area: 400 acres (160 ha)
- Built: 1861
- Built by: United States Gypsum Co.
- NRHP reference No.: 77000715
- Added to NRHP: December 16, 1977

The Alabaster Historic District is a 400-acre mining complex in Iosco County, Michigan, centered on an open pit gypsum mine. It is bounded by on the east by Lake Huron, on the north by Gypsum Road, on the south by Keystone Road, and on the west by Rempert Road, south of Tawas City, the county seat. This historic district, where mining started in 1862, was listed on the National Register of Historic Places in 1977. Gypsum produced here was used to manufacture the temporary buildings of the World's Columbian Exposition in Chicago in 1893. The Alabaster Mining Company is still operating here.

== Description ==
The Alabaster Historic District, located on the shore of Lake Huron, contains an enormous open pit gypsum mine, with associated processing buildings, shops, and offices. The district also contains the company town, with houses and outbuildings. Most of the worker housing was constructed as 1 1/2-story frame houses with gable roofs. The district also contains a rail line and the remains of an elevated marine tramway running 1 1/2 miles into Saginaw Bay. The district contains 36 buildings developed over a total of 400 acres.

== History ==
This location was named "Alabaster" after a variety of gypsum discovered offshore in 1837 by Douglass Houghton. Soon, prospectors began searching for further sources of gypsum in the area, and stumbled upon the deposits at this site. The deposits came to the attention of George B. Smith, whose father, B.F. Smith, owned a gypsum mill in Detroit. Smith bought the land, and opened the mine in 1862.

George Smith soon died, and ownership changed hands, with his father B.F. Smith purchasing a major share. In 1891, the company was called Western Plaster Works. A fire in 1891 completely destroyed the mining structures, but operations were soon rebuilt. The Alabaster Mine supplied material for construction of the main buildings, known as the "white city," at the World's Columbian Exposition in Chicago in 1893.

In 1898, the company name was changed to the Alabaster Company. In 1902, the mine was incorporated as the U.S. Gypsum Corporation. Housing for workers was constructed primarily in the period around 1910, as a company town was established. The mines had attracted many European immigrants as workers in the late 19th and early 20th centuries.

The most visible and impressive structure in the district, the elevated marine tramway, was not constructed until 1929. The tramway was demolished in the 1990s.

The mine is still being operated today (2016).

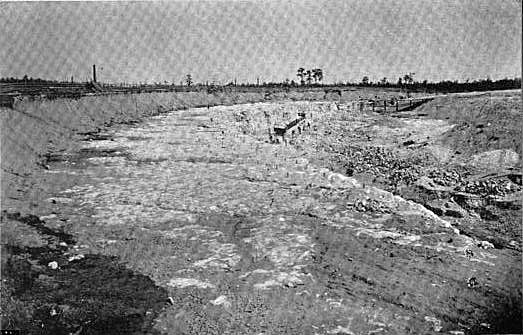
Alabaster Gypsum Quarry, c 1904

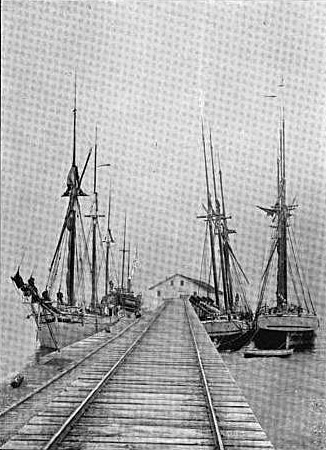
Loading Dock, c 1904
