= Lake State Railway =

Railroad in Michigan

Lake State Railway Company
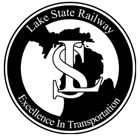

Overview
- Headquarters: Saginaw, Michigan, USA
- Reporting mark: LSRC
- Locale: Michigan
- Dates of operation: 1992–present
- Predecessor: Detroit and Mackinac Railway; Saginaw Bay Southern Railway

Technical
- Track gauge: 4 ft 8 1/2 in (1,435 mm) standard gauge
- Length: 375 miles (604 km)

Other
- Website: lsrc.com

Lake State Railway Company (reporting mark LSRC) is a railroad operating in the Saginaw Valley and northeastern quadrant of the Lower Peninsula of Michigan. The railroad moves large quantities of aggregate and limestone, as well as coal, grain, and chemical products. Some of the company's largest customers include Dow Chemical Company, S. C. Johnson & Son, Lafarge, ConAgra Foods, Archer Daniels Midland, Conrad Yelvington Distributors, and Consumers Energy.

== History ==
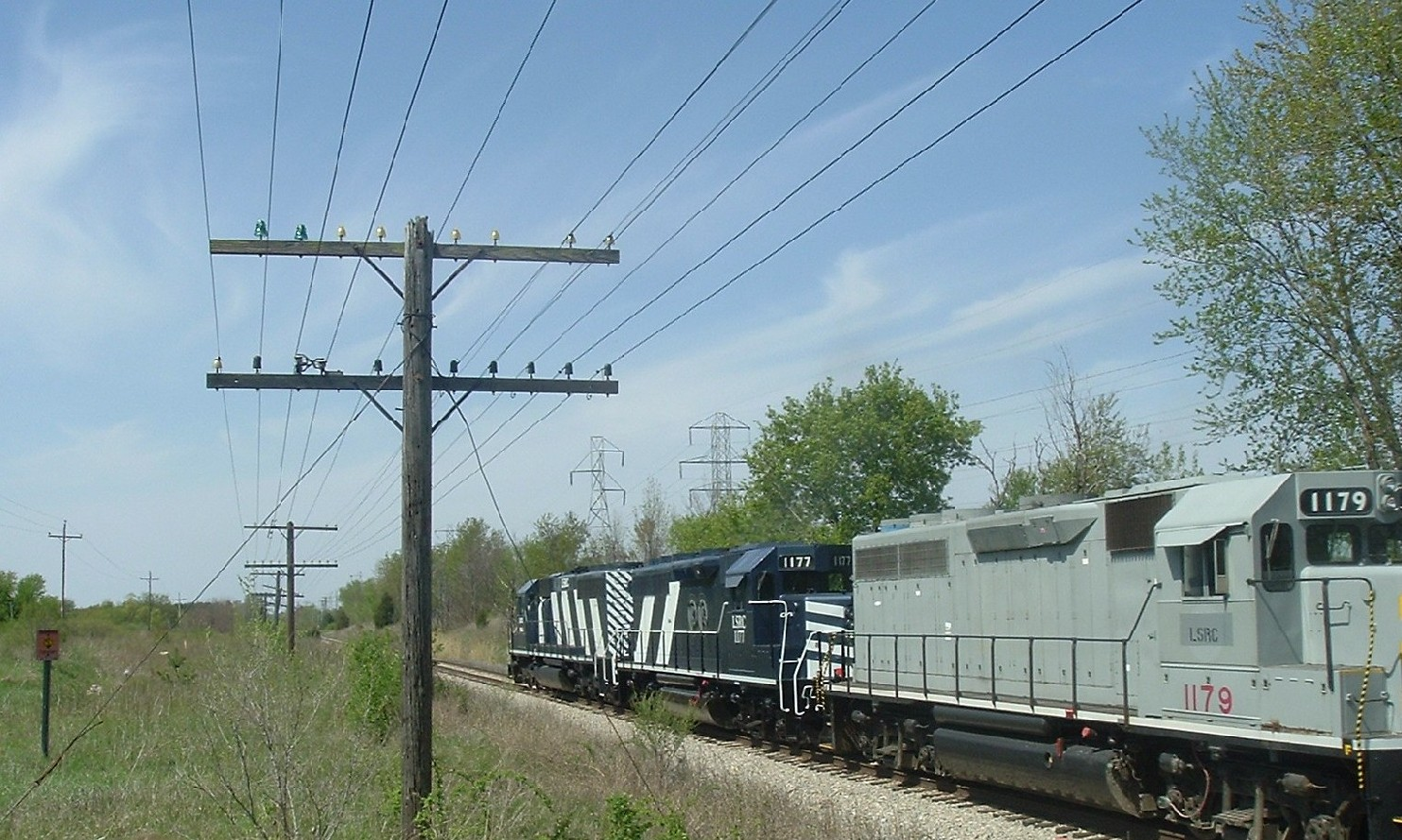
LSRC SD40 and GP40s heading north along Neff Road near Mt. Morris in northern Genesee County, MI

Lake State began operations in 1992 after Jim George acquired all the lines operated by the Detroit and Mackinac Railway. One of the lines acquired was originally Michigan Central from Bay City to Cheboygan. Another line—originally D&M trackage—branched off in Pinconning and followed Michigan's eastern coastline to Rogers City. The trackage north of Gaylord to Cheboygan was abandoned shortly thereafter. While a few minor spurs were abandoned, no other mainline was until 2001, when its line past Alpena to Rogers City (the Rogers City Branch) was removed.

In 2005, Lake State acquired 67 miles of trackage from CSX Transportation around Saginaw, Midland, and Bay City. This trackage was operated under the subsidiary Saginaw Bay Southern Railway.

In late 2011, it was announced that the SBS would merge with Lake State, with LSRC being the surviving company. The merger was strictly for railway accounting purposes; LSRC functioned as an Interline Settlement System (ISS) carrier, while SBS functioned as a Junction Settlement (JS) carrier through CSX. Lake State converted the former SBS lines to ISS. Following the news of the merger, Lake State stopped painting the Saginaw Bay Southern logo on its locomotives.

On June 11, 2018, Lake State started leasing 4 miles of former Grand Trunk Western trackage in Port Huron, MI from Canadian National. The line was part of the original mainline that was built by the Grand Trunk Railway in 1859. The line runs from the west end of CN's rail yard at Tappan to Dunn Paper at the head of the St. Clair River and Lake Huron. Despite the closure of Domtar in 2021 and Dunn in 2022, Lake State plans to continue rail service on this line and develop new business. It was announced in 2025 that the former Domtar Mill was sold and would restart production on one of its paper machines under the ownership of Legacy Paper Group.

In 2018, Railway Age awarded Lake State with their "Shortline of the Year" award.

In March 2019, LSRC began leasing 53 miles of the CSX Saginaw Subdivision from Mt. Morris to Plymouth.

In March 2021, LSRC began transporting automotive traffic from the old Buick City Flint facility.

In November 2021, Railway Age awarded Lake State with their "Regional of the Year" award.

In March 2022, LSRC was purchased by Antin Infrastructure Partners.

In the Huron division, there are museums at former railroad depots at Harrisville, Lincoln, and Standish, Michigan. The latter two include retired engines and rolling stock.

== Route ==
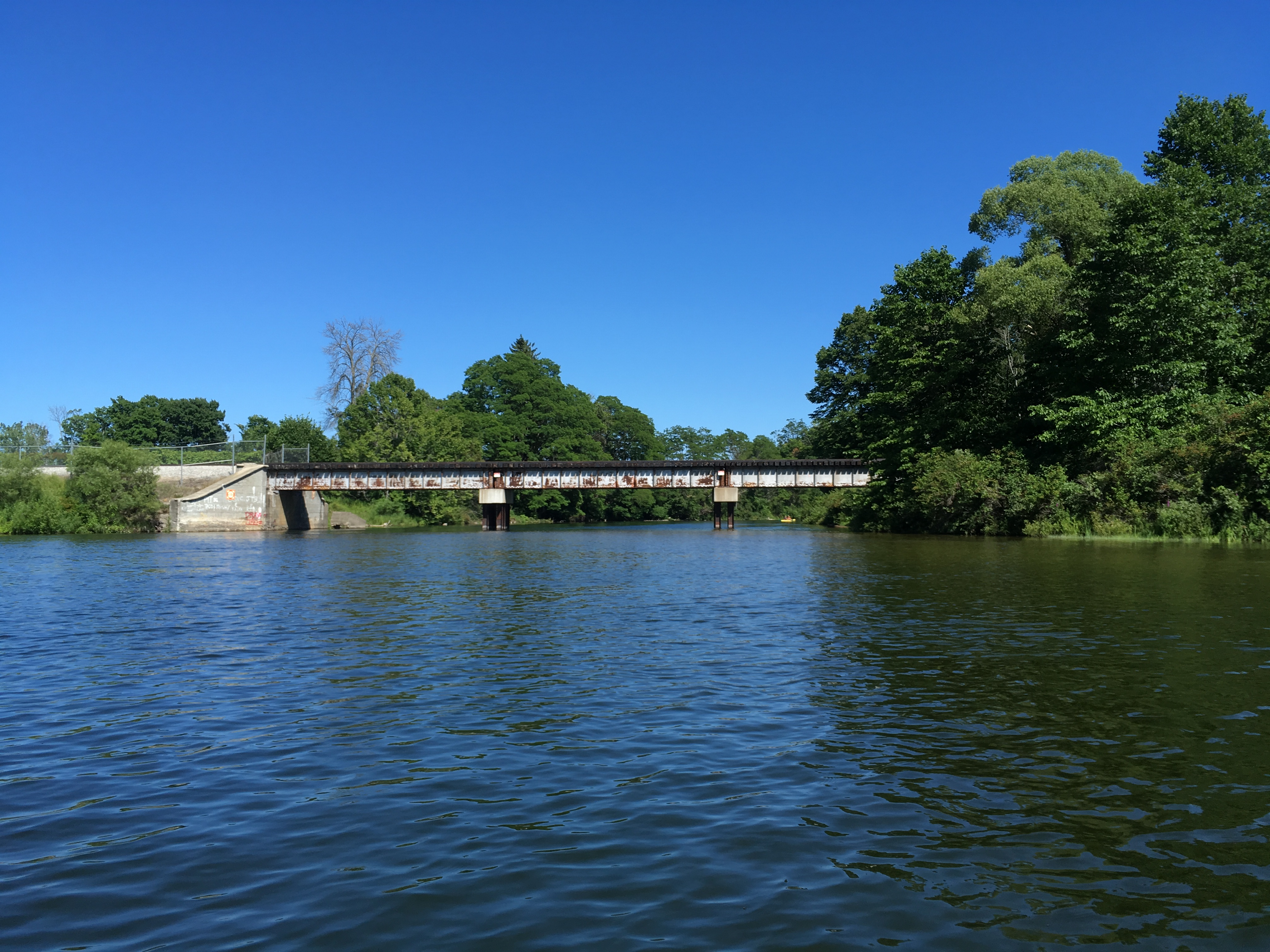
Lake State Railway bridge over Au Sable River near Oscoda

Lake State Railway's Flint–Saginaw line (former SBS) is shadowed by several parks and walking trails. North of Saginaw, MI, the line passes through the Crow Island State Game Area. In Bay County, the main line splits into two branches. The west line extends north through the Ogemaw Hills and Jack Pine forests to Otsego County, Michigan and the city of Gaylord, Michigan. The east line shadows the western shore of Lake Huron and Saginaw Bay. This line runs along old US-23, serving the Gypsum quarries in Iosco County, MI and eventually street-running through East Tawas, MI. North of East Tawas, the line passes through the Huron National Forest, Harrisville, Michigan and Harrisville State Park. Near Alpena, MI, the line passes over the scenic Thunder Bay River. At the north end of the east line is Lafarge's cement plant and Lake freighter loading dock in Alpena, MI.

Lake State interchanges with the Huron and Eastern Railway in Saginaw, Bay City, and Midland; the Mid-Michigan Railroad in Paines; CSX in Wixom, and Canadian National in Flint, Port Huron.

Lake State Railway has 8 Subdivisions:

- Bay City Subdivision
- Blue Water Subdivision
- Dean Subdivision
- Huron Subdivision
- Mackinaw Subdivision
- Paines Subdivision
- Pinnconning Subdivision
- Saginaw Subdivision

== Motive Power ==
Lake State utilized the Detroit and Mackinac Railway's all-ALCO roster, repainting a handful of Alco RS3, and ALCO Century Series locomotives in the Lake State blue scheme. Lake State's first acquisition was in November 1995—a former Norfolk and Western Railway ALCO RS-11. Keeping with the D&M tradition of numbering engines after the month and year of purchase, the unit was given the number 1195. Starting in 1998, eight units of Canadian National heritage were added to the roster. Seven of these units are MLW M-420s, while the eighth is an HR412W #698.

Lake State Railroad named several of its locomotives after cities located on its line, such as #181 (City of Bay City, MI), #798 (City of Alpena, MI), #3564 (City of Tawas, MI), #1280 (City of Grayling, MI), #1195 (City of East Tawas, MI), #976 (City of West Branch, MI). In a similar fashion, the #975, #3563 and #371 were named after Lake Huron, Lake Superior, and Lake Erie. The most unusual nicknaming was of #3571: 'For the Gipper 2004' after the late 40th President of the United States, Ronald Reagan.

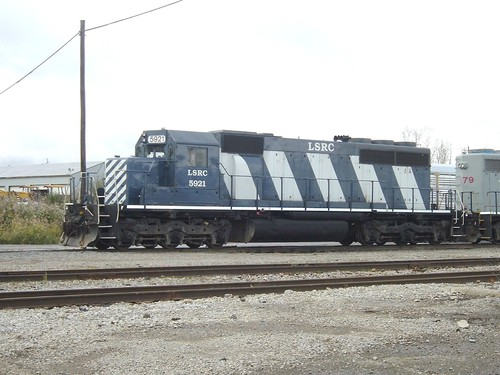
LSRC EMD SD40 5921 returning to the CSX McGrew yard in Flint, MI

Since the acquisition of the Saginaw Bay Southern lines north of Flint, MI, the railroad has added 27 used Electro Motive Diesel units and gradually retired their ALCO roster. The first of these units included three GP38Ms (modified GP35s of mixed heritages) from Western Rail (WRIX) in Washington state. An EMD SD40 #5921 of Grand Trunk Western heritage was purchased from Larry's Truck & Electric (LTEX). This unit is unique in that it doesn't operate north of Bay City. In January 2022 this unit was scrapped. The majority of the EMD units are EMD GP40s. Ten were acquired from First Union Railroad (FURX). All share mixed Chessie System/Seaboard System heritage and were upgraded from GP40 to GP40M-3 by the Texas Mexican Railway. The next group of locomotives included five original GP40s of mixed heritage and a unique former Southern Pacific EMD GP40X. All six were acquired from Helm Financial Corporation (HATX). In early June 2013, five EMD SD40-2s were purchased from CIT Rail Resources (CITX). All units were built as EMD SD40s with mixed heritage and were later converted to Dash 2 standards.

In late spring 2016, Lake State acquired two EMD MP15AC locomotives from Union Pacific. #1501 was originally built in October, 1980 as Missouri-Kansas-Texas #57. #1502 was built in January, 1976 as Milwaukee Road #436.

In January 2019, Lake State acquired six SD50-2's from CSX - #2477, #2490, #2498, #8527, #8577, #8599

In 2020 Lake State acquired a couple Norfolk Southern locomotives - #704, a RP-E4c slug, #2373, a MP15DC which is now #1503 and GP40-2 #3010, now #301 and #4301.

Lake State Railway bought 9 SD70M’s from UP, becoming LSRC 6431-6438 including 1776 painted in the red, white, and blue for the upcoming United States Semiquincentennial. LSRC 1776 (Note: Bicentennial 250 Years of Freedom Unit) < UP 4670, LSRC 6430 < ex-UP 4605, LSRC 6431 < ex-UP 4608, LSRC 6432 < ex-UP 4609, LSRC 6433 < ex-UP 4667, LSRC 6434 < ex-UP 4668, LSRC 6435 < ex-UP 4612, LSRC 6436 < ex-UP 4382, LSRC 6437 (Note: Spirit of Pere Marquette Heritage Unit) < ex-UP 4379, LSRC 6438 (1776) < ex-UP 4670.

In December 2025, Lake State Railway bought 4 SD70ACe-T4 locomotives from Progress Rail to replaced 4 SD50-3 locomotives and an SD40-2, which are over 40 years old.

== Notes ==
Preceded by Reading Blue Mountain and Northern Railroad	Regional Railroad of the Year; 2021	Succeeded by South Kansas and Oklahoma Railroad
