= Detroit and Mackinac Railway =

Railroad that formerly operated in Michigan, U.S.

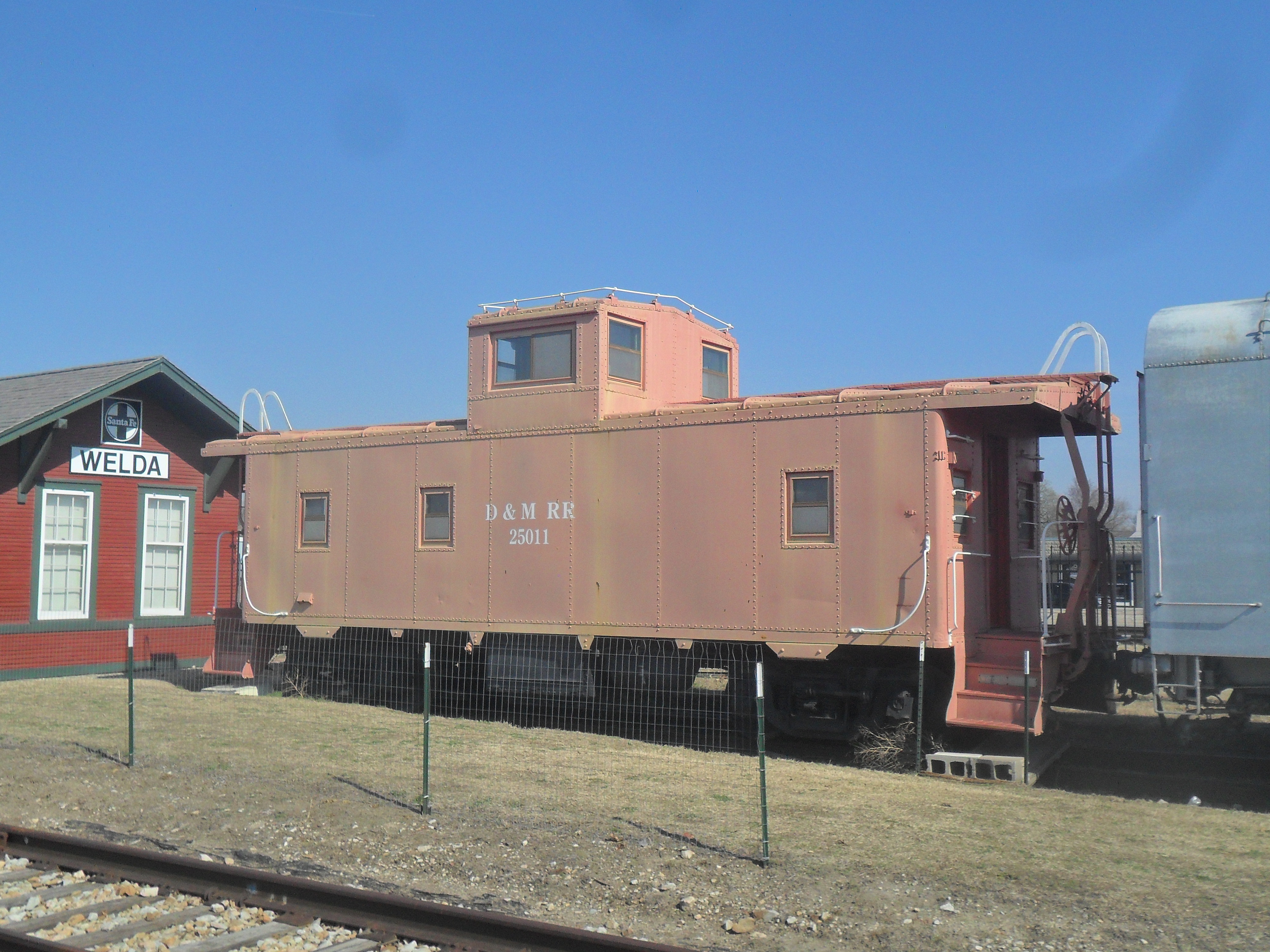
- D&M 25011, now on display at the Great Overland Station in Topeka, Kansas

Overview
- Reporting mark: D&M, DM
- Locale: eastern Michigan, along or near Lake Huron
- Dates of operation: 1894–1992
- Successor: Lake State Railway

Technical
- Track gauge: 4 ft 8 1/2 in (1,435 mm) standard gauge

The Detroit and Mackinac Railway (reporting marks D&M, DM), informally known as the "Turtle Line", was a railroad in the northeastern part of the Lower Peninsula of the U.S. state of Michigan. The railroad had its main offices and shops in Tawas City with its main line running from Bay City north to Cheboygan, and operated from 1894 to 1992. In 1946, it became the first all diesel haul railroad in the United States.

At the end of 1925 it incorporated 375 miles of road and 470 miles of track; that year the Turtle Line reported 81 million ton-miles of revenue freight and seven million passenger-miles. In 1967 it reported 124 million ton-miles on 224 miles of road.

== History ==
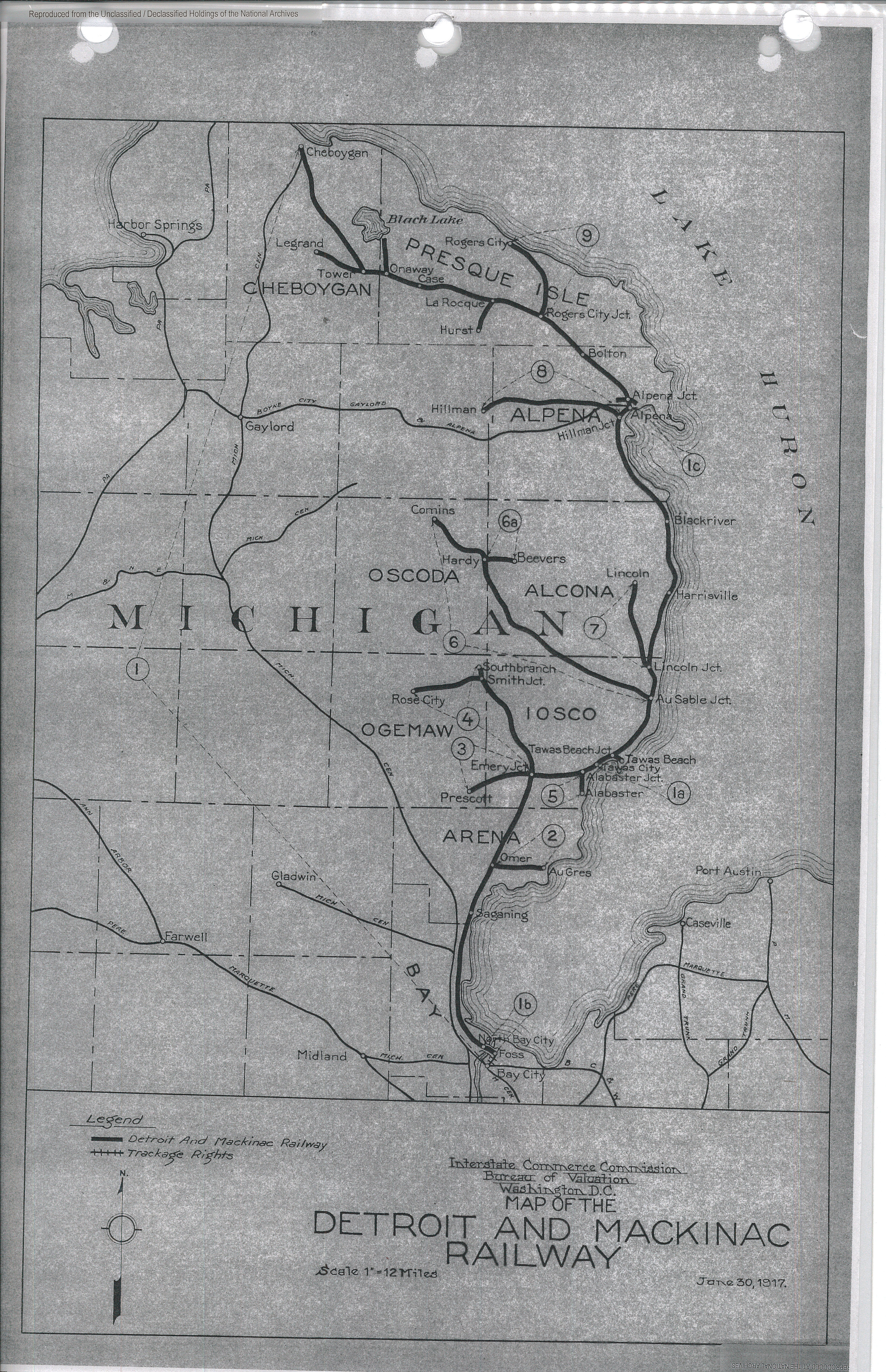
1912 map of the railway

The Detroit, Bay City & Alpena Railroad, was a 3 ft 2 in (965 mm) narrow gauge short line operated from Bay City northward to the Lake Huron port of Alpena. The line was converted to 4 ft 8 1/2 in (1,435 mm) standard gauge in 1886 and was reorganized into the Detroit and Mackinac (D&M) on December 17, 1894. During the late 1890s and the first decade of the Twentieth Century, the timber resources of northeastern Michigan were fully utilized and the D&M expanded its trackage northward from Alpena to Cheboygan. The Bay City-Cheboygan main line prospered, and a stone passenger depot was constructed in Harrisville.

The main constituent of the freight service offered by the D&M and its predecessor railroads was timber from what was then the vast forests of northeastern Michigan; the D&M built spurs and branch lines to the forested areas. The Rogers City Branch served the limestone quarries of Rogers City. In 1922, the railroad also had branch lines to Au Gres, Comins, Curran, Hillman, Lincoln, Prescott, and Rose City.

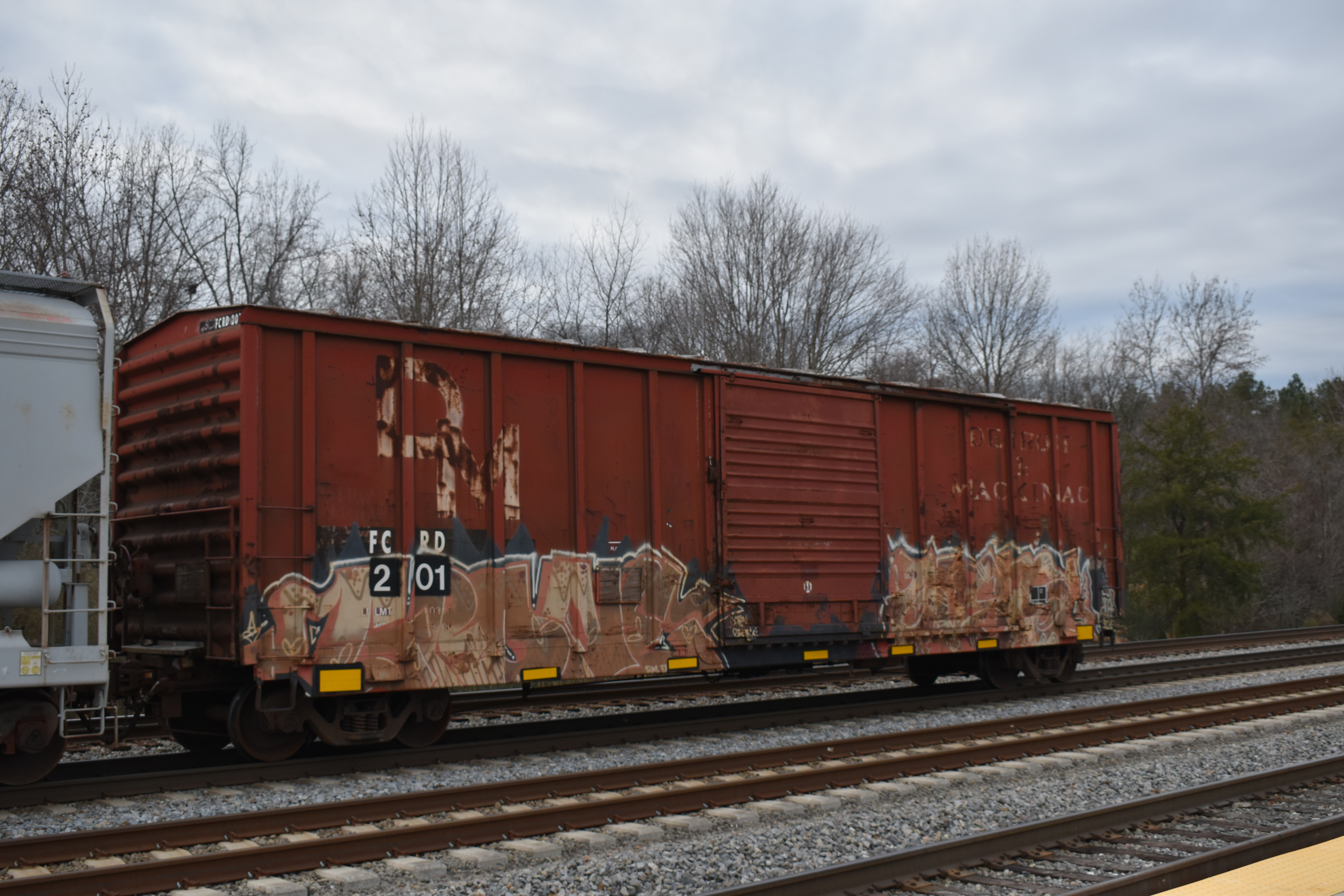
Former Detroit and Mackinac Railway boxcar on a CSX freight train in Fredericksburg, Virginia in 2021

In the 1940s, D&M had enough revenue to be a Class I railroad and it was one of the first such to eliminate steam locomotives in 1948.

In March 1976, the Detroit & Mackinac acquired a combination of trackage and operating trackage rights from the remains of the bankrupt Penn Central that created an alternate main line from Bay City northward, through Gaylord and Cheboygan, to Mackinaw City. However, adverse economic conditions continued to affect railroad operations in the northeastern United States. The road was sold to the Lake State Railway in 1992, and ended its existence as an independent railroad.

The Detroit & Mackinac called itself the "Turtle Line" and its logo symbol was "Mackinac Mac". The railroad bore the hostile backronym of "Defeated & Maltreated".

=== Passenger service ===
The D&M mainline from Bay City to Alpena offered sleeping car and meal services between Detroit and Alpena in the 1930s. Continuing coaches were carried over Michigan Central Railroad tracks from Detroit to Bay City. Separate motor coach trains operating daily except Sunday carried passengers from Alpena to the northern extent of D&M territory, Cheboygan.

By the 1940s, meal services had disappeared. By 1949, service was reduced to a morning trip from Bay City to Alpena and a reverse trip in the evening. Sleeping cars were eliminated. And service from Alpena to Cheboygan was discontinued as well. Passenger service was entirely eliminated by 1951.

Named train passenger service in the mid-1930s consisted of:

- Resorter (#1), sleeping car, Detroit to Alpena; coach, Bay City to Alpena (coach passengers would take a Michigan Central train from Detroit to Bay City)
- Clipper (#3), coach via Michigan Central, Detroit to Bay City; motor coach train from Bay City to Alpena
- New Yorker (#4), motor coach train from Alpena to Bay City; coach via Michigan Central, Bay City to Detroit
- Sunset (#12), sleeping car, Alpena to Detroit; coach, Alpena to Bay City (coach passengers would take a Michigan Central train from Bay City to Detroit)

== Legacy ==
The Lake State Railway continued as of 2012 to use traditional handheld technology (picks, shovels, hammers) to replace railroad ties and make other roadbed repairs on surviving trackage that had previously been part of the Detroit and Mackinac system.

A collection of D&M artifacts, including a 1920s switching engine, are housed at the depot in Lincoln, Michigan. The stone depot in Standish, Michigan is also a museum, with rolling stock. The railroad's GE 44-ton locomotive, #10, has been preserved by the Southern Michigan Railroad Society. 0-6-0 Locomotive #8 (Baldwin Locomotive Works #41228) is preserved and awaiting restoration in storage at The Henry Ford (Greenfield Village) in Dearborn, Michigan.

== See also ==
- Huron Sunrise Trail
- North Eastern State Trail
- Harrisville, Michigan – stone depot
- Lincoln, Michigan – wooden depot museum, with rolling stock–switch engine and caboose
- Standish, Michigan – stone depot museum, with rolling stock
- Southern Michigan Railroad Society
- Aloha State Park: A park created by the railroad.
