= Onaway Area Schools =

School district in Michigan

Address
- 4549 M-33 Onaway, Presque Isle County, Michigan, 49765; United States

District information
- Motto: Working together to prepare students for life.
- Grades: PreKindergarten–12
- Superintendent: Shaun Jordan
- Schools: 3
- Budget: $8,734,000 2022–2023 expenditures
- NCES District ID: 2626400

Students and staff
- Students: 511 (2024–2025)
- Teachers: 34.7 (on an FTE basis) (2024–2025)
- Staff: 77.71 FTE (2024–2025)
- Student–teacher ratio: 14.73 (2024–2025)
- District mascot: Cardinals

Other information
- Website: www.onawayschools.com

Onaway Area Schools is a public school district in Northern Michigan. In Presque Isle County, it serves Onaway, Millersburg, and the townships of Allis, Bearinger, Case, North Allis, and Ocqueoc. In Cheboygan County, it serves the townships of Forest and Waverly.

== History ==
The first school in Onaway was established in 1882. The current school building replaced a 1915 school, which had been expanded with additions in 1935 and 1937. After the state fire marshal determined in 1961 that the school building was unsafe, plans were made to construct a new school. To support the project, several outlying school districts consolidated with Onaway. Although those districts had been independent, they had long sent their high school students to Onaway on a tuition basis. Voters approved the consolidations in May 1961.

Onaway's current school building opened in fall 1963 and was dedicated on March 1, 1964.

== Schools ==
Schools in Onaway Area Schools district share a building at 4549 M-33 in Onaway.

Schools in Onaway Area Schools
School	Notes
Onaway High School	Grades 9–12
Onaway Middle School	Grades 6-8
Onaway Elementary	Grades K-5
