= Ocqueoc River =

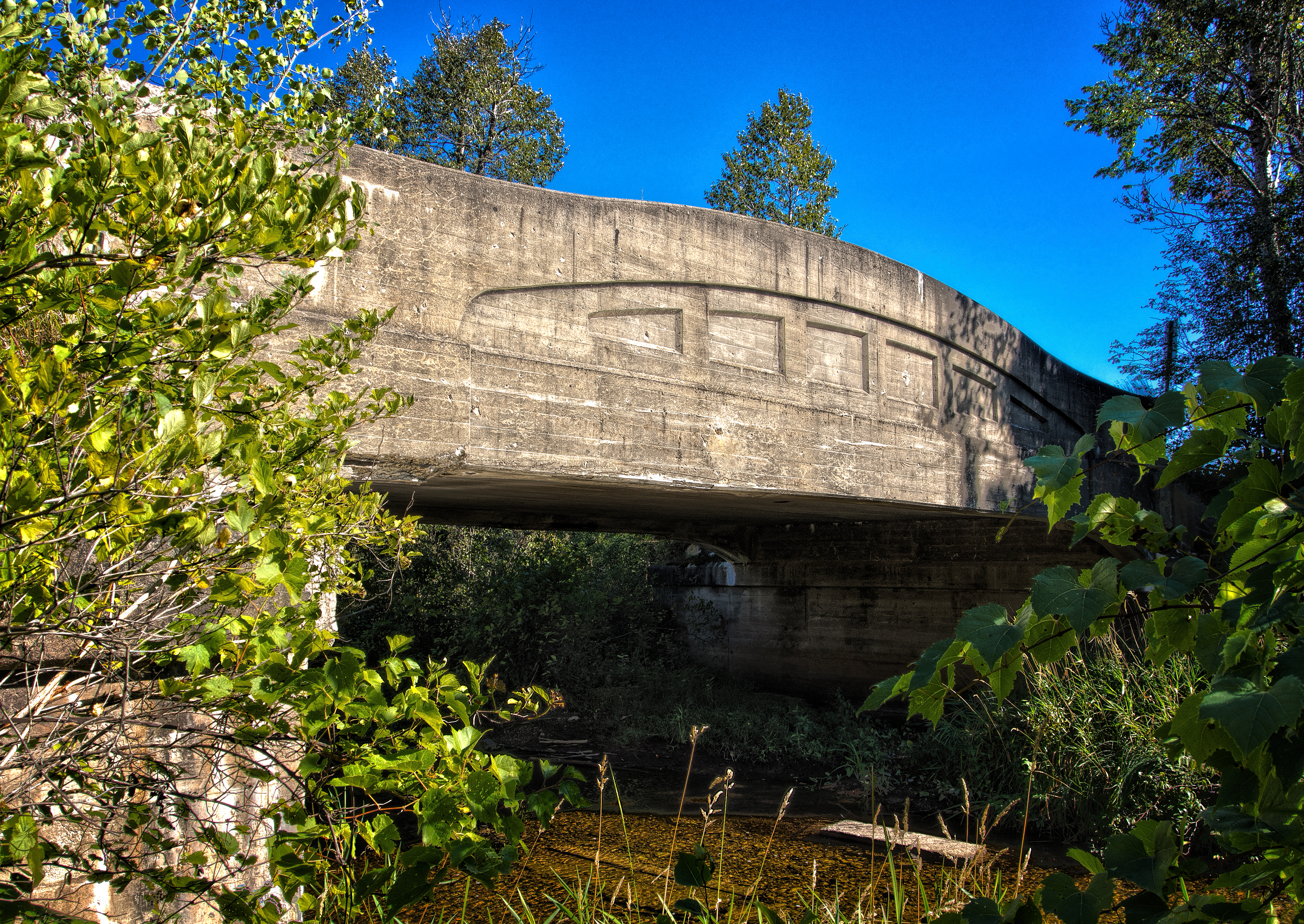
- River Road over the Ocqueoc River.

Location
- Country: United States

Physical characteristics
- Source
  - location: Bismarck Township, Presque Isle County, Michigan
- Mouth
  - location: Lake Huron at Ocqueoc Township, Presque Isle County, Michigan
  - elevation: 584 feet (178 m)
- Length: 34 mi (55 km)
- Basin size: 94,394 acres (382.00 km^{2})

Basin features
- Tributaries
  - left: Silver Creek, Little Ocqueoc River, Indian Creek

The Ocqueoc River (/ˈɑːkiːɑːk/ AH-key-ock) is a 34.2-mile-long (55.0 km) blackwater river in the U.S. state of Michigan. The river is located in the northeastern Lower Peninsula, flowing into Lake Huron in Presque Isle County. The river drains a watershed of approximately 94,394 acres (382.00 km^{2}). Along the river are the Ocqueoc Falls, the largest and only named waterfall in Michigan's Lower Peninsula.

Ocqueoc is a French adaptation of an Anishinabemowin (Ojibwe) term meaning "crooked waters".

== Description and course ==
The Ocqueoc River is the largest river entirely within Presque Isle County and drains several lakes, including Ocqueoc Lake, and receives a few tributaries, the largest being the Little Ocqueoc River and Silver Creek. The Ocqueoc River's source is in southern Bismarck Township at 45°13′15″N 83°55′45″W approximately 10 miles (16 km) southeast of the village of Millersburg, which with a population 263 people at the 2000 Census is the largest community in the watershed.

Ocqueoc Falls are the largest waterfalls in the Lower Peninsula of Michigan with a drop of about 5 feet (1.5 m). The falls and the Ocqueoc Falls Bicentennial Pathway, which offers groomed winter trails and summer hiking trails, are a tourist attraction of Presque Isle County. The Ocqueoc River is one of the few rivers in the Lower Peninsula to flow north.

The Ocqueoc River flows through a limestone karst region, and some of its tributaries, notably the Little Ocqueoc, are not continuous on the surface but flow through subterranean systems for part of their course. The upper reaches of the river's watershed is swampy with cedar, tamarack, balsam, poplar, aspen and black ash common. The warmer upper ranges have more warm-water fish including sunfish, pike and bass, while the lower cooler part of the river has salmon and trout. Smelt dipping is a style of fishing used near the mouth of the Ocqueoc.

== Drainage basin ==
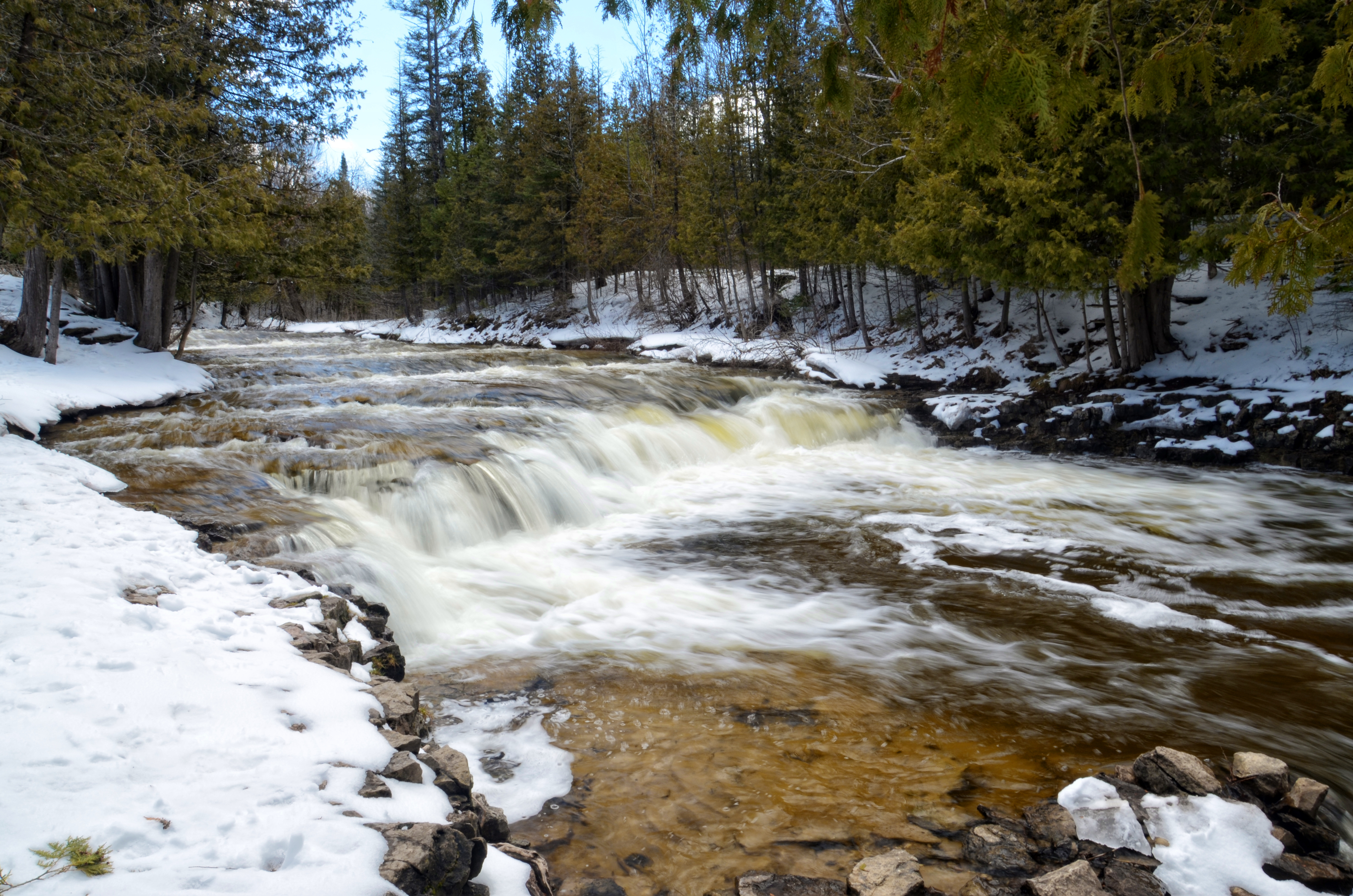
Ocqueoc Falls in winter

The Ocqueoc River drainage basin includes all or portions of the following townships and municipalities in Presque Isle County:

- Bearinger Township

Bismarck Township

- Case Township
- Millersburg
- Moltke Township
- Ocqueoc Township

A very small portion of the watershed is located in northern Montmorency County but contains no surface water.

== Named tributaries ==
Named waterbodies with direct surface flow into the Ocqueoc River system, from the mouth:

- Ocqueoc Lake
- (right) Orchard Lake
  - Mud Lake
- (left) Silver Creek
- (left) Little Ocqueoc River
  - (right) Fox Creek
- (left) Indian Creek
- Upper Barnhart Lake
  - (right) McIntosh Lake
- Lower Barnhart Lake
  - (left) Mud Lake
- Lake Nettie
  - (left) Bullhead Lake
  - (right) Lake Ann
  - (left) Horseshoe Lake
  - (right) Lake Emma
    - Moores Lake
  - (right) Marl Bed Lake
