= Bismarck Township, Michigan =

- Civil township
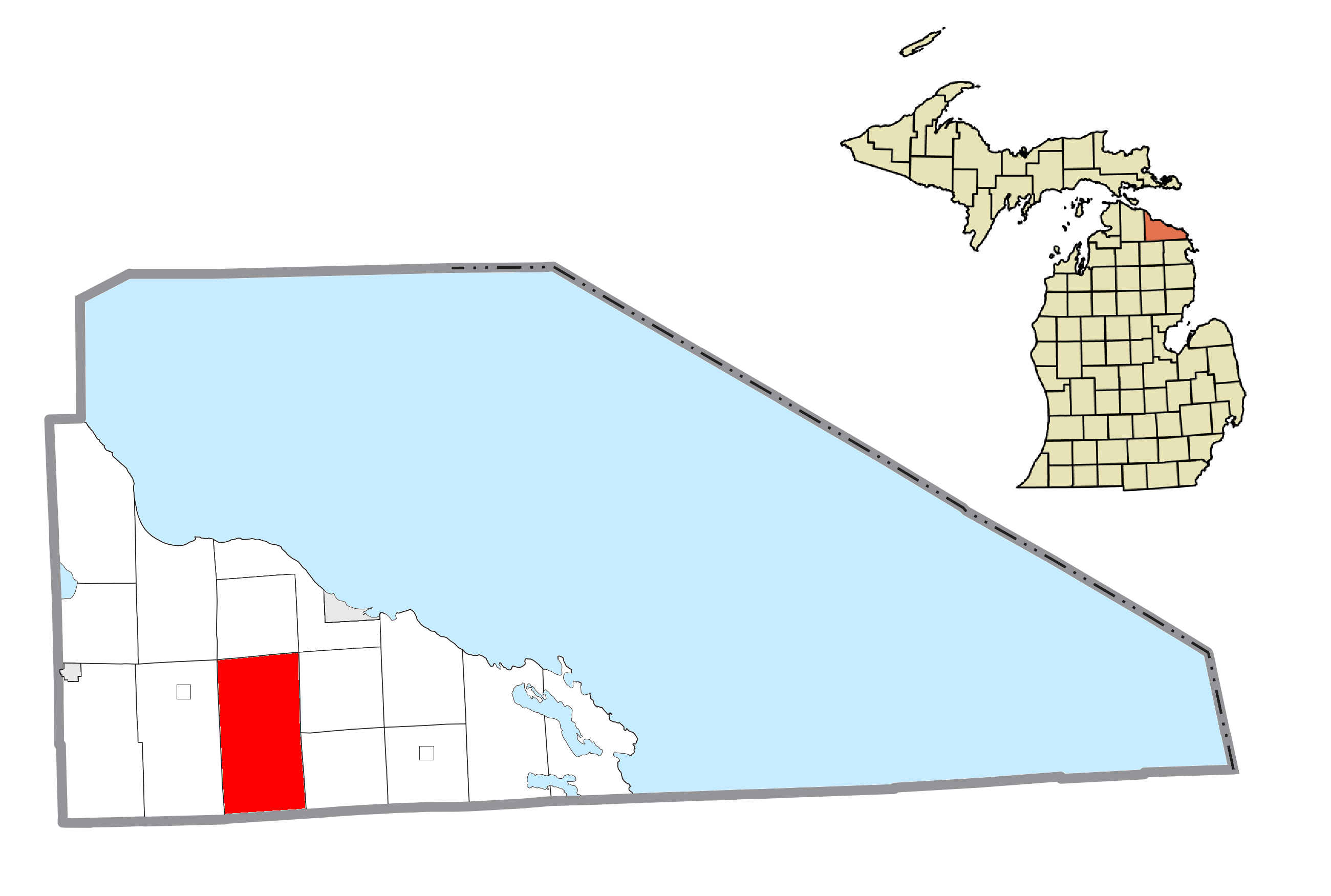
- Location within Presque Isle County

- Location within the state of Michigan Bismarck Township (the United States)
- Coordinates: 45°17′23″N 83°57′53″W
- Country: United States
- State: Michigan
- County: Presque Isle

Area
  - Total: 69.9 sq mi (181.0 km^{2})
  - Land: 67.6 sq mi (175.2 km^{2})
  - Water: 2.2 sq mi (5.8 km^{2})
- Elevation: 876 ft (267 m)

Population (2020)
  - Total: 351
  - Density: 5.19/sq mi (2.00/km^{2})
- Time zone: UTC-5 (Eastern (EST))
  - Summer (DST): UTC-4 (EDT)
- ZIP code(s): 49743, 49759, 49779
- Area code: 989
- FIPS code: 26-08700
- GNIS feature ID: 1625942

Bismarck Township is a civil township of Presque Isle County in the U.S. state of Michigan. As of the 2020 census, the township population was 351.

== Communities ==
- Hawks is a small unincorporated community at 45°18′07″N 83°53′15″W in the eastern part of township at the boundary with Belknap Township. The Hawks post office, with ZIP code 49743, also serves much of southern Bismarck Township, as well as southern Belknap Township, a portion of western Pulawski Township to the east of Belknap, the western portion of Metz Township, and a small part of southeastern Case Township. The Hawks post office opened on August 26, 1896. The community was named for James Dudley Hawks, then president of the Detroit and Mackinac Railway, after the railroad established a station there in 1895.

== Geography ==
According to the United States Census Bureau, the township has a total area of 69.9 square miles (181 km^{2}), of which 67.6 square miles (175 km^{2}) is land and 2.2 square miles (5.7 km^{2}) (3.19%) is water.

== Demographics ==
As of the census of 2000, there were 408 people, 180 households, and 135 families residing in the township. The population density was 6.0 inhabitants per square mile (2.3/km^{2}). There were 570 housing units at an average density of 8.4 per square mile (3.2/km^{2}). The racial makeup of the township was 99.26% White, 0.25% African American, 0.25% from other races, and 0.25% from two or more races. Hispanic or Latino of any race were 0.25% of the population.

There were 180 households, out of which 20.6% had children under the age of 18 living with them, 66.7% were married couples living together, 4.4% had a female householder with no husband present, and 25.0% were non-families. 20.6% of all households were made up of individuals, and 8.9% had someone living alone who was 65 years of age or older. The average household size was 2.23 and the average family size was 2.56.

In the township the population was spread out, with 16.4% under the age of 18, 2.5% from 18 to 24, 22.5% from 25 to 44, 33.6% from 45 to 64, and 25.0% who were 65 years of age or older. The median age was 51 years. For every 100 females, there were 111.4 males. For every 100 females age 18 and over, there were 111.8 males.

The median income for a household in the township was $31,477, and the median income for a family was $33,182. Males had a median income of $25,357 versus $20,938 for females. The per capita income for the township was $16,713. About 7.3% of families and 8.6% of the population were below the poverty line, including 14.3% of those under age 18 and 9.1% of those age 65 or over.
