= Albert Molitor =

German-American businessman, politician and co-founder of Rogers City, Michigan, USA

- Born: February 2, 1842; Ludwigsburg, Stuttgart, Kingdom of Württemberg
- Died: September 18, 1875 (aged 33); Rogers City, Michigan, United States

Albert Joseph von Molitor (February 2, 1842 – September 18, 1875) was a German-American businessman and politician who co-founded the community of Rogers City, Michigan. His heritage from the German nobility and reports of his cruelty toward his employees led him to be nicknamed "Baron" or "the King of Presque Isle County". He was shot and killed in 1875, but his murder remained unsolved until 1891, when one of his killers confessed and implicated 16 other men.

== Early life ==
Molitor was born on February 2, 1842, in Ludwigsburg in what was then part of the Kingdom of Württemberg. His mother, Franziske Amalie Schmid, was unmarried at the time of his birth and is said to have been on the personal staff of Queen Pauline Therese. Throughout Molitor's life, there were unfounded rumors that he was the illegitimate son of King William I of Württemberg, which Molitor did nothing to deny. On April 25, 1842, his mother married Joseph Cleander von Molitor, a knight and Oberleutnant in the Württemberg army, and baptized her son as Albert Joseph von Molitor at the Leonhardskirche in Stuttgart.

A member of the minor nobility, Molitor became a cadet in the general staff of the Württemberg army. In 1861, he was caught sneaking into a government building and copying architectural plans for the Fortress of Ulm. For this infraction, he was court-martialed and jailed for 14 days. Shortly thereafter, Molitor fled Germany through the port of Hamburg and traveled to the United States, where he was one of the many German immigrants recruited by Franz Sigel into the XI Corps of the Union Army during the American Civil War. He served as a lieutenant in the 13th Independent Battery New York Light Artillery.

== Career ==
Molitor's military experience led him to join the Army Corps of Engineers and its United States Lake Survey in 1864. Through his surveying work, he traveled to what is now Presque Isle County, Michigan. He began purchasing timberland in the area and convinced fellow surveyor J. Paul Mayer to do the same. Molitor partnered with another surveyor, William Evans Rogers, to start the Molitor-Rogers Company, which founded Rogers City as a company town built around a lumber mill. Rogers' involvement in the company was limited outside of financing and legal work, leaving Molitor in control of the town. Molitor spent much of his time in Detroit recruiting other German immigrants to come up to Rogers City for work.

Rogers City's rival as the primary settlement in the area was Crawfords Quarry, which had a better natural harbor. Molitor had tried to purchase the Crawfords Quarry townsite from the Crawford family, but the Crawfords would not sell it. In 1871, Molitor was instrumental in the creation of Presque Isle County, which up until then had been part of Alpena County. The new county was to be controlled by a Board of Supervisors, consisting of a Township Supervisor elected from each of the county's townships. At the time of the first election, there were only two townships in the new county, Presque Isle Township and Rogers Township. Molitor ran for Township Supervisor of Rogers Township, against Leonard C. Crawford of Crawfords Quarry. 72 votes were cast for "L. C. Crawford", 69 for Albert Molitor, 7 for "B. C. Crawford", and 2 for "Leonard Crawford". Molitor argued that "L. C. Crawford", as written on the largest number of ballots, did not unambiguously refer to Leonard C. Crawford, making Molitor the person with the most uncontested votes. The issue was taken to the Michigan Supreme Court, which gave no judgment. Molitor ultimately won, becoming Township Supervisor and the new county's first register of deeds.

During Molitor's tenure, Rogers City was remote, with no railroads connecting it to the rest of Michigan. It could only be reached by boat during the summer months, and was effectively isolated from the rest of the world in the winter when Lake Huron froze over (hence the name "Presque Isle", French for "almost an island"). Molitor, who quickly became the richest man in Rogers City, used his wealth to collect resources during the summer, and his mill's company store thus became one of the only sources of food in town during the winter. This gave Molitor monopolistic power over the county and its people. Many of the German immigrants who lived in and around Rogers City were forty-eighters who had fled the German states after the liberal revolutions they had supported were crushed. Historian John P. Jenkins argues that they may have found Molitor's behavior uncomfortably similar to that of the tyrannical feudal lords they had left behind.

In 1874, Molitor served as county treasurer, a role in which he issued large bonds for a schoolhouse and other improvements, then raised property taxes to pay them off. Molitor reported costs of $8,000 (equivalent to $228,000 in 2025) to build the schoolhouse, but the actual cost of the building was likely no more than $500 (equivalent to $14,000 in 2025). When asked to show the ledgers to members of the public, he refused. One day, a mob gathered in front of the company store and threatened to hang Molitor unless he produced the ledgers. Molitor, unintimidated, sat in front of the crowd eating his dinner until they dispersed.

Between 1871 and 1875, Molitor's power as Township Supervisor gave him one-half control over the county's affairs, creating a deadlock whenever he disagreed with the supervisor of Presque Isle Township. In 1875, Molitor approached the Michigan Legislature, asking them to create five additional rural townships, each with its own vote on the Board of Supervisors. When the new townships were created, however, Molitor forced them to share portions of the debts he had incurred as treasurer, aggravating the farmers who lived there.

By 1875, Hermann Hoeft had started a general store in Rogers City, threatening Molitor's monopoly on food during the winter. Hoeft accepted scrip from Molitor's mill as payment for his goods, then demanded Molitor exchange the scrip for cash. When Molitor refused, Hoeft sued him (the lawsuit was still unresolved at the time of Molitor's death). Through these actions, many county farmers who despised Molitor came to trust Hoeft, and Hoeft gained enough influence in town to be elected city treasurer, further threatening Molitor's control of the community.

== Murder and investigation ==
On the evening of August 23, 1875, Molitor was in the mill office with his clerk, Edward Sullivan. Frederic Denny Larke, a business partner of Molitor's who also served as Presque Isle county clerk, was on his way to meet with Molitor when he heard gunshots from the office. Larke summoned the sheriff and a doctor, and the three went into the office to find Molitor with several wounds from buckshot in his back and through his ribs, and Sullivan with a wound through his jaw.

Both Sullivan and Molitor initially survived their injuries and were taken to a steamer that would bring them south for better medical treatment. Sullivan died on August 26, while he was being carried to the boat. Molitor was taken to Alpena, where a successful operation was performed. He was then brought to Harper Hospital in Detroit for further surgical treatment. Ultimately, he was taken to his brother's house on Bagg Street (now Temple Street) in Detroit, where he died of his wounds on September 18.

The sheriff, John Rich, attempted to investigate the double murder. His prime suspect was Andrew Banks, a farmer from Moltke Township, based on a distinctive set of boot prints found at the scene. However, a mob of local farmers threatened Rich's life, and he ultimately dropped the investigation.

The murders remained a notorious cold case in northern Michigan for 16 years. On July 30, 1891, William Repke, another Moltke Township farmer, came forward and confessed. He also named 16 other individuals, most of them farmers, who he alleged were part of the conspiracy to kill Molitor. Hermann Hoeft and Andrew Banks were accused of leading the group.

Of the men Repke implicated, two had died since 1875, four turned state's evidence to avoid prosecution, and Hoeft and Banks were dropped from the case after presenting alibis. The remaining nine were put on trial, but it proved impossible to assemble an impartial jury in Presque Isle County. After 17 months, the case was moved to Alpena County, where five of the nine defendants were convicted and sentenced to life imprisonment with hard labor at Jackson State Prison. Four of the five were pardoned by Governor Hazen S. Pingree in 1898. William Repke, the last remaining in prison, was pardoned on the final day of Pingree's term, January 1, 1901. The pardon board recommended these pardons to Pingree on the grounds that Molitor "was a despot. [...] He played well the role of lord and master and seemed to regard these people as slaves".

Interest in the case was revived in September 1901, after President William McKinley was assassinated by Leon Czolgosz. Newspaper reports claimed that Czolgosz's father Paul, who had lived in Rogers City around 1875, was one of Molitor's assassins. However, Paul Czolgosz was not among those named by William Repke, and his other son Waldeck Czolgosz denied that Paul had been in Rogers City at the time of the murder.
