= Liske =

Liske may refer to:

Places

- Liske, Michigan, an unincorporated community located in Pulawski Township, Presque Isle County, Michigan, United States

People with the surname

- Ksawery Liske (1838–1891), Polish historian
- Pete Liske (1942), American football quarterback
