= Sacred Rock (Presque Isle County) =

Geological feature

Coordinates: 45°28′31″N 83°53′47″W

Sacred Rock is an Engadine-dolomite boulder, now 20 feet long by 8 feet wide and 6 feet high, on the shore of Lake Huron in Northern Lower Michigan. It is located 6 miles north of Rogers City, Michigan, approximately 0.5 miles north of P.H. Hoeft State Park. Located in front of private cottages, the best way to reach the site is by turning east off of U.S. 23 onto State Park Road (just north of the state park) and parking where the road ends at the lake, then walking 1/2 mile north along the beach to the rock. Usually the rock is found partly buried in the sand, but when water levels are at their highest levels the rock can be partly or fully submerged in the lake.

== History ==
Presque Isle County was inhabited by migratory Native Americans who used the area for hunting and fishing. The rock is located midway between the Ocqueoc River and Swan River, and served as a key boundary marker for competing tribes, as well as an altar for animal sacrifices. It was probably deposited by the last receding glaciers which formed the Great Lakes, and likely originated from the Lake Superior region of Canada. The rock is now a recognized tourism site, and listed as a historic & archaeological site by the Northeast Michigan Regional Planning Commission.

== Folklore ==
Frederick Denny Larke wrote the following in 1909: "The history of the Sacred Rock is this: Ages ago, where the rock now stands, was the boundary line between the hunting grounds of two Indian tribes; the chief of the one was exceedingly aggressive and frequently trespassed upon the preserves of the neighboring tribe, and, in so doing, had caused much trouble and bloodshed to follow these excursions. At last the chiefs of the two tribes met, when the one as usual was trespassing over the border, and an altercation ensued which would probably have again resulted in a bloody war between the conflicting tribes, but Kitchie Manitou, the Great Spirit, who was up Lake Superior at the time, became disgusted with both of them, seized hold of the Sacred Rock and hurled it down, crushing both the chiefs beneath its immense weight, which was so great, that the banks above the beach have been sliding and trembling ever since. Hence the Rock became an object of worship to the Indian races."

Others say that when it rains, the blood from the dead Indian chiefs can be seen on the rock.

== See also ==
- List of individual rocks
