= Ocqueoc Township, Michigan =

- Civil township
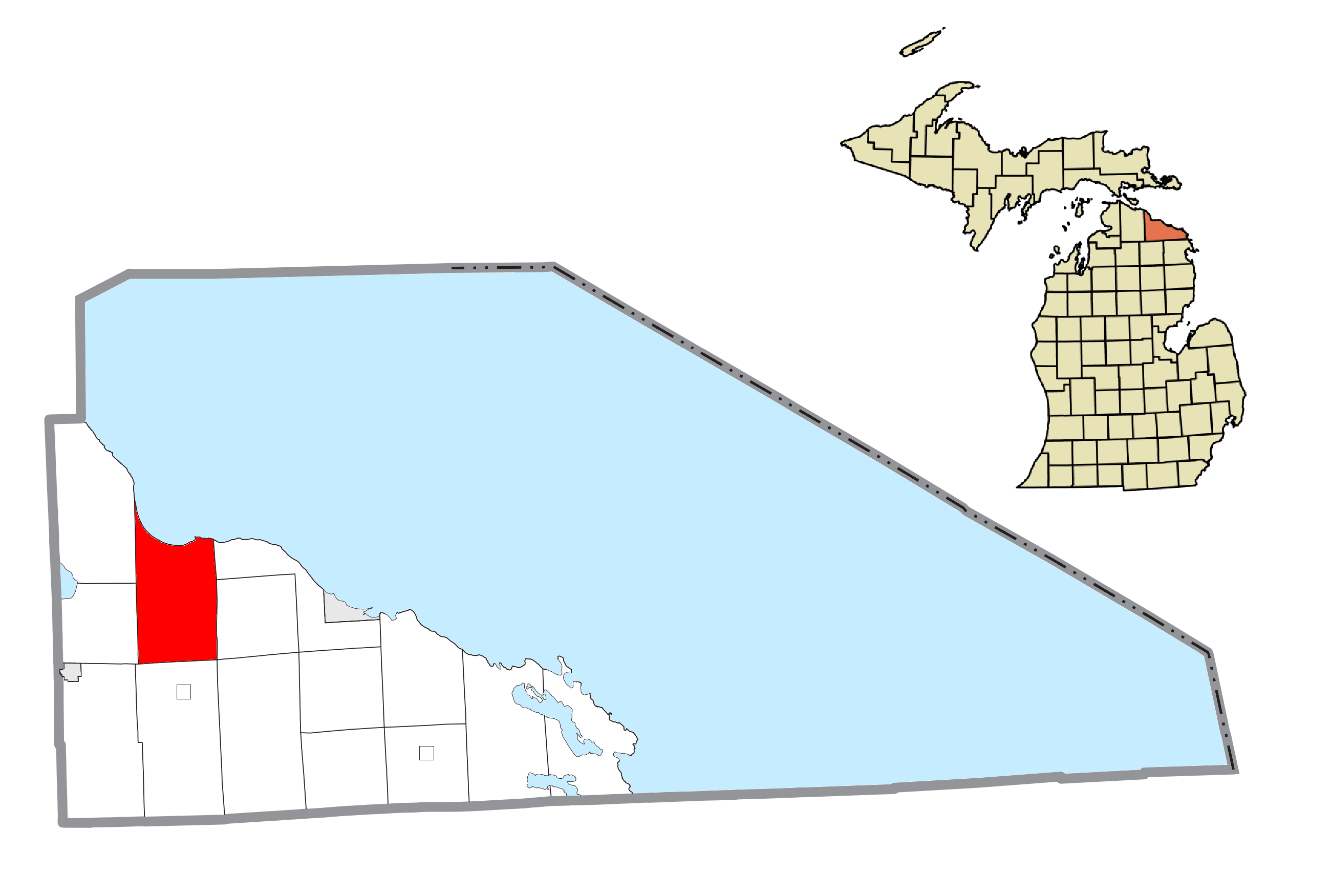
- Location within Presque Isle County

- Location within the state of Michigan Ocqueoc Township (the United States)
- Coordinates: 45°27′33″N 84°04′04″W
- Country: United States
- State: Michigan
- County: Presque Isle

Area
  - Total: 52.6 sq mi (136.3 km^{2})
  - Land: 52.3 sq mi (135.5 km^{2})
  - Water: 0.31 sq mi (0.8 km^{2})
- Elevation: 620 ft (190 m)

Population (2020)
  - Total: 544
  - Density: 10.4/sq mi (4.01/km^{2})
- Time zone: UTC-5 (Eastern (EST))
  - Summer (DST): UTC-4 (EDT)
- ZIP code(s): 49759, 49779
- Area code: 989
- FIPS code: 26-60160
- GNIS feature ID: 1626836
- Website: https://ocqueoctwpmi.gov/

Ocqueoc Township (/ˈɑːkiːɑːk/ AH-key-ock) is a civil township of Presque Isle County in the U.S. state of Michigan named after the Ocqueoc River. The population of Ocqueoc Township was 544 at the 2020 census, down from 655 at the 2010 census.

== Geography ==
According to the United States Census Bureau, the township has a total area of 52.6 square miles (136.3 km^{2}), of which 52.3 square miles (135.5 km^{2}) is land and 0.3 square mile (0.8 km^{2}) (0.59%) is water.

=== Geographic features ===
- Hammond Bay (Lake Huron)
- Ocqueoc Falls
- Ocqueoc Lake

== Transportation ==
=== Private airports ===
The nearest private airports in Presque Isle County are:

- Presque Isle County Airport (Rogers City)
- Leo E. Goetz County Airport (Onaway) Permanently CLOSED

=== Commercial airports ===
The nearest commercial airports are:

- Alpena County Regional Airport
- Cherry Capital Airport (Traverse City)
- Chippewa County International Airport (ciuair.com)
- Pellston Regional Airport (www.pellstonairport.org)

=== Highways ===
- US 23
- M-68
- M-211

=== Notable roads ===
- North Allis Highway
- Ocqueoc Falls Highway
- Ocqueoc Road

== Demographics ==
As of the census of 2000, there were 634 people, 280 households, and 199 families residing in the township. The population density was 12.1 per square mile (4.7/km^{2}). There were 691 housing units at an average density of 13.2 per square mile (5.1/km^{2}). The racial makeup of the township was 98.42% White, 0.32% Native American, 0.16% Asian, 0.47% from other races, and 0.63% from two or more races. Hispanic or Latino of any race were 0.79% of the population.

There were 280 households, out of which 19.6% had children under the age of 18 living with them, 60.4% were married couples living together, 9.3% had a female householder with no husband present, and 28.9% were non-families. 25.4% of all households were made up of individuals, and 12.5% had someone living alone who was 65 years of age or older. The average household size was 2.18 and the average family size was 2.55.

In the township the population was spread out, with 17.0% under the age of 18, 3.8% from 18 to 24, 18.6% from 25 to 44, 29.5% from 45 to 64, and 31.1% who were 65 years of age or older. The median age was 54 years. For every 100 females, there were 85.9 males. For every 100 females age 18 and over, there were 89.9 males.

The median income for a household in the township was $28,125, and the median income for a family was $33,269. Males had a median income of $27,143 versus $25,250 for females. The per capita income for the township was $15,432. About 9.4% of families and 14.5% of the population were below the poverty line, including 18.3% of those under age 18 and 10.2% of those age 65 or over.

== Education ==
Ocqueoc Township is part of the Onaway Area Community School district.

The Onaway Schools consists of an Elementary school (K-5) and Middle/High School (6–12).

== Area Attractions ==
- Rogers City Municipal Marina has nearly 100 slips, most on floating docks. There is a fishing platform on the east wall for breakwater fishing.
- P. H. Hoeft State Park has one mile (1.6 km) of sandy shoreline and 301 acres (1.22 km^{2}) on Lake Huron. Hiking trails run through the forest and along the lake. There is a 142 site campground. The day use area has a playground, picnic sites, and a beach. It was one of the fourteen original Michigan state parks, and the land was donated by lumber baron Paul H. Hoeft on January 2, 1922. It is a 'four season park' offering camping even in the winter.
- Presque Isle County Historical Museum (Rogers City)
- A list and link for state historical markers is at Presque Isle County.

== Area Events ==
- Memorial Day Weekend Open House including Afternoon of Arts & Crafts at Forty Mile Point Light
- Presque Isle County Fair, Millersburg, Michigan, last weekend in June
- Rogers City Nautical Festival, first complete weekend in August
- Rogers City Salmon Tournament, second weekend in August
- Posen Potato Festival, Posen, Michigan, first weekend in September
- Annual Great Lakes Lighthouse Festival—Four days in second week in October, Forty Mile Point Open For Tours All Four Days
- Ocqueoc river and Ocqueoc Lake

== Media ==
The following can be accessed in Ocqueoc Township, MI

=== Newspapers ===
- The local newspaper, the Presque Isle County Advance, has served the area since 1878. The Advance made statewide news itself in February 2006, when it fell victim to a fire which also destroyed Big D's Pizza. Both businesses recovered, with Big D's moving to a new location and the Advance moving into a beautiful new structure 10 months after the fire.
- The Alpena News is the daily newspaper of record for much of northeastern Lower Peninsula of Michigan.

=== Television ===
- Channel 4:WTOM-TV "TV 7&4" (NBC) (Cheboygan) (simulcasted in channel 7, Harrietta)
- Channel 6:WCML "CMU Public Television" (PBS) (Montmorency Township)
- Channel 8:WGTQ "ABC 29&8" (ABC) (Goetzville) (simulcasted in channel 29, Kalkaska)
- Channel 10:WWUP-TV "9&10 News" (CBS) (Goetzville) (simulcasted in channel 9, Tustin)
- Channel 11:WBKB-TV "Channel 11 News" (CBS) (Alpena)

=== Radio ===
==== FM ====
| Call Sign | Frequency | City Broadcast From |
|---|---|---|
| WTLI | 89.3 | Bear Creek Township |
| WPHN | 90.5 | Gaylord |
| WCML | 97.1 | Alpena |
| WFXD | 92.5 | Atlanta |
| WKJZ | 94.9 | Hillman |
| WLXT | 96.3 | Petoskey |
| WRGZ | 96.7 | Rogers City |
| WAWM | 98.9 | Petoskey |
| WHAK | 99.9 | Rogers City |
| WMJZ | 101.5 | Gaylord |
| WMKC | 102.9 | Indian River |
| WGFM | 105.1 | Cheboygan |
| WHSB | 107.7 | Alpena |

==== AM ====
| Call Sign | Frequency | City Broadcast From |
|---|---|---|
| WTCM | 580 | Traverse City |
| WHAK | 960 | Rogers City |
| WWMN | 1110 | Petoskey |
