= Hagensville, Michigan =

- Unincorporated community
- Location within Michigan Location within the United States
- Coordinates: 45.3333463°N 83.7819386°W
- Country: United States
- State: Michigan
- County: Presque Isle
- Elevation: 781 ft (238 m)
- Time zone: UTC-5 (Eastern (EST))
  - Summer (DST): UTC-4 (EDT)
- Area code: 989
- GNIS feature ID: 1617602

Hagensville is an unincorporated community located in Belknap Township, Presque Isle County, Michigan, United States. The community is six miles south of Rogers City, the county seat. Hagensville had a post office from 1886 to 1912 and now is a ghost town.
