= Metz Township, Michigan =

- Civil township
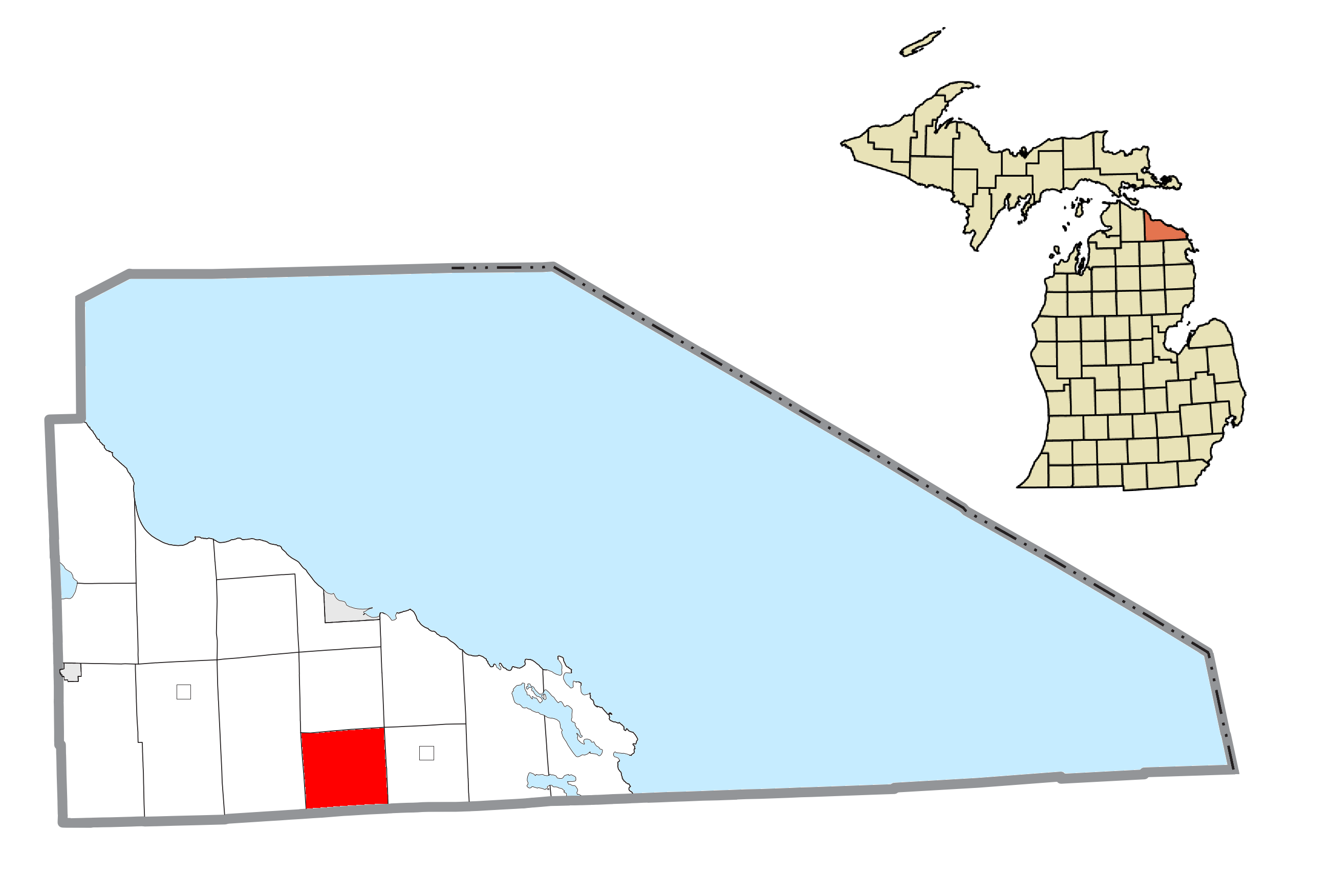
- Location within Presque Isle County

- Location within the state of Michigan Metz Township (the United States)
- Coordinates: 45°15′14″N 83°48′48″W
- Country: United States
- State: Michigan
- County: Presque Isle

Area
  - Total: 35.8 sq mi (92.8 km^{2})
  - Land: 35.8 sq mi (92.7 km^{2})
  - Water: 0 sq mi (0.0 km^{2})
- Elevation: 781 ft (238 m)

Population (2020)
  - Total: 280
  - Density: 7.8/sq mi (3.0/km^{2})
- Time zone: UTC-5 (Eastern (EST))
  - Summer (DST): UTC-4 (EDT)
- ZIP code(s): 49743, 49776
- Area code: 989
- FIPS code: 26-53440
- GNIS feature ID: 1626731

Metz Township is a civil township of Presque Isle County in the U.S. state of Michigan. The population was 280 at the 2020 census.

== Communities ==
Metz is a small unincorporated community within the township.

== Geography ==
According to the United States Census Bureau, the township has a total area of 35.8 square miles (93 km^{2}), of which 35.8 square miles (93 km^{2}) is land and 0.03% is water.

== History ==
In 15 October 1908, a large forest fire consumed 2,500,000 acres (10,000 km^{2}) of Presque Isle County, and most of the area of Metz. Killed were 42 men, women, and children, many of whom were on a train derailed by rails twisted from the fire.

These included:

- William Barrett, adult
- Leo Buskowski, adult
- Lizzie Cicero, adult; Margaret Cicero, seven years; George Cicero, five years; Gerlen Cicero, two years
- Elizabeth Dost, four years
- Otille Erke, adult; Matilda Erke, six years; Gertrude Erke, eight years; Chearles Erke, four years; Lorene Erke, two years
- Emma Hardies, adult; Pauline Hardies, nine years; Mary Hardies, three years; Minnie Hardies, eight months
- Eufrozyna Konieczny, adult; Joseph Konieczny, three years; John Konieczny, two years; Helena Konieczny, seven months
- Arthur Lee, adult
- John Nowicki, adult; Catherine Nowicki, adult
- John Samp, adult
- Rovert Wagner, eighteen years

Most were of either Polish or German nationality. This became known as the "Metz Fire."

== Demographics ==
As of the census of 2000, there were 331 people, 134 households, and 92 families residing in the township. The population density was 9.2 inhabitants per square mile (3.6/km^{2}). There were 207 housing units at an average density of 5.8 per square mile (2.2/km^{2}). The racial makeup of the township was 97.89% White, 1.51% Native American, 0.30% Asian, and 0.30% from two or more races.

There were 134 households, out of which 29.9% had children under the age of 18 living with them, 61.9% were married couples living together, 3.0% had a female householder with no husband present, and 30.6% were non-families. 27.6% of all households were made up of individuals, and 14.9% had someone living alone who was 65 years of age or older. The average household size was 2.46 and the average family size was 3.03.

In the township the population was spread out, with 21.8% under the age of 18, 10.0% from 18 to 24, 20.8% from 25 to 44, 28.7% from 45 to 64, and 18.7% who were 65 years of age or older. The median age was 44 years. For every 100 females, there were 113.5 males. For every 100 females age 18 and over, there were 112.3 males.

The median income for a household in the township was $28,611, and the median income for a family was $31,458. Males had a median income of $32,917 versus $16,000 for females. The per capita income for the township was $14,191. About 8.8% of families and 13.6% of the population were below the poverty line, including 15.1% of those under age 18 and 19.5% of those age 65 or over.
