= Ocqueoc Falls =

Series of waterfalls on the Ocqueoc River in Michigan, United States

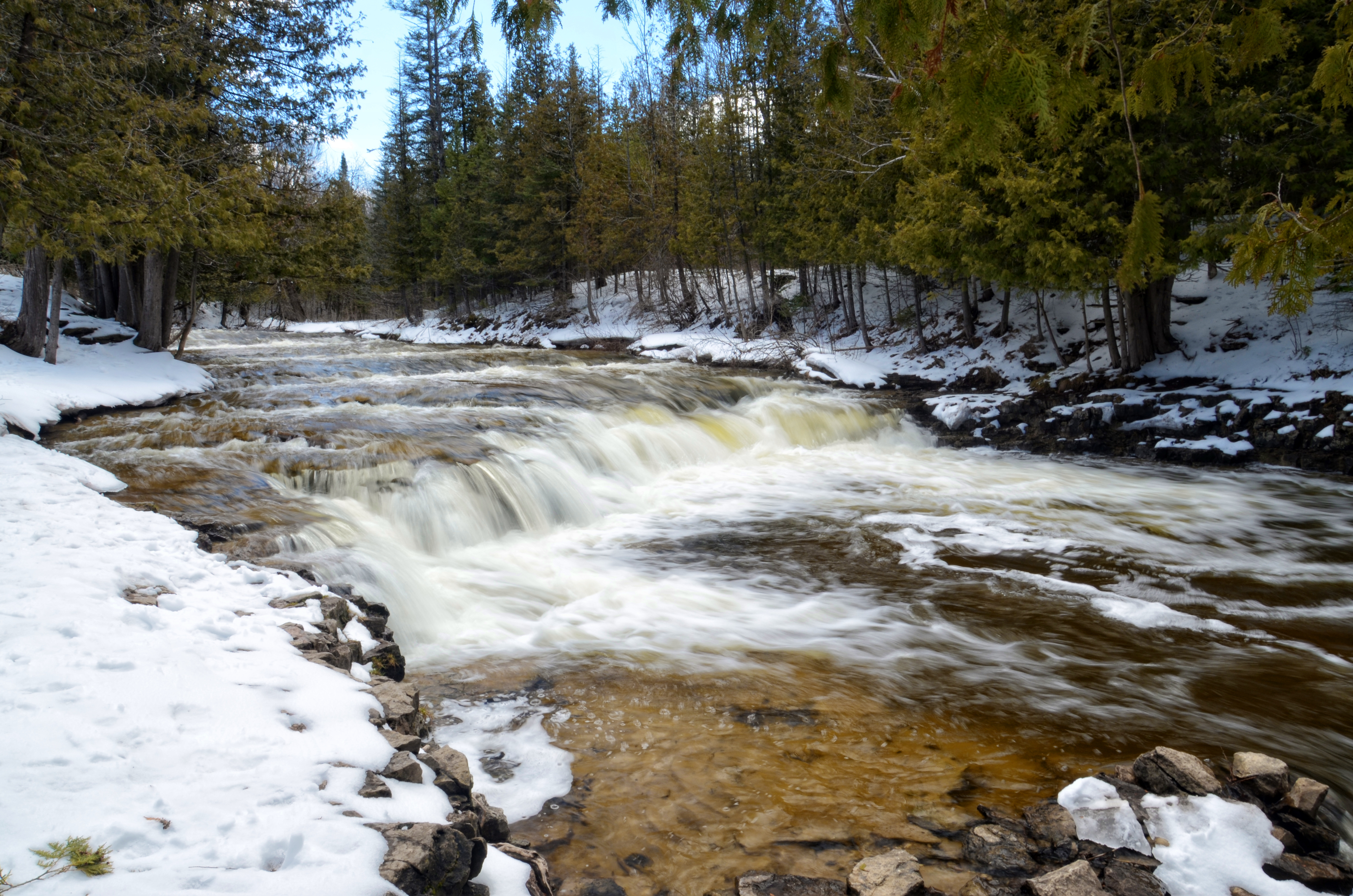
- Ocqueoc Falls in winter
- Interactive map of Ocqueoc Falls
- Location: Presque Isle County, Michigan
- Coordinates: 45°23′46″N 84°3′29″W
- Type: Cascade
- Total height: 5 feet (1.5 m)
- Watercourse: Ocqueoc River

Ocqueoc Falls (/ˈɑːkiːɑːk/ AH-key-ock) are a series of rapids and waterfalls in the U.S. state of Michigan. Located along the Ocqueoc River in Presque Isle County, Ocqueoc Falls are the largest and only named waterfall in the Lower Peninsula of Michigan.

The falls are located within the Atlanta Unit of the Mackinaw State Forest, and are managed by the nearby Hoeft State Park. Adjacent the falls are the Ocqueoc Falls Bicentennial Pathway, a 6.3-mile (10.1 km) universally-accessible trail, and the Ocqueoc Falls State Forest Campground.

At the falls, the Ocqueoc River drops 5 feet (1.5 m) before entering a small gorge with rocky walls. Below the gorge, the Ocqueoc River flows to Hammond Bay, a bay of Lake Huron.
