= North Allis Township, Michigan =

- Civil township
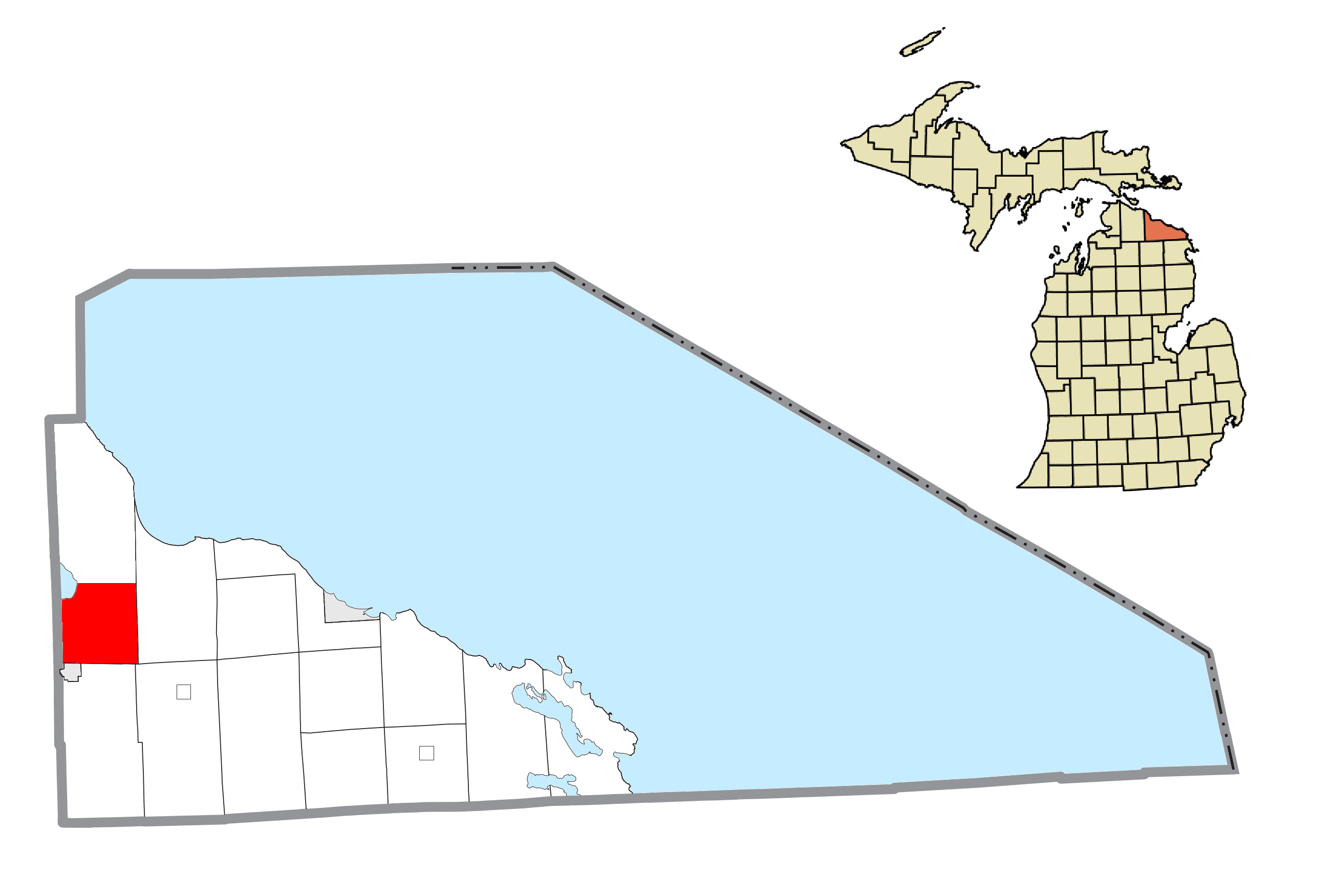
- Location within Presque Isle County

- Location within the state of Michigan North Allis Township (the United States)
- Coordinates: 45°24′54″N 84°11′37″W
- Country: United States
- State: Michigan
- County: Presque Isle

Area
  - Total: 34.3 sq mi (88.8 km^{2})
  - Land: 32.7 sq mi (84.7 km^{2})
  - Water: 1.6 sq mi (4.1 km^{2})
- Elevation: 748 ft (228 m)

Population (2020)
  - Total: 467
  - Density: 14.3/sq mi (5.51/km^{2})
- Time zone: UTC-5 (Eastern (EST))
  - Summer (DST): UTC-4 (EDT)
- ZIP code(s): 49765
- Area code: 989
- FIPS code: 26-57940
- GNIS feature ID: 1626810

North Allis Township is a civil township of Presque Isle County in the U.S. state of Michigan. The population was 467 at the 2020 census.

== Geography ==
According to the United States Census Bureau, the township has a total area of 34.3 square miles (89 km^{2}), of which 32.7 square miles (85 km^{2}) is land and 1.6 square miles (4.1 km^{2}) (4.67%) is water.

Allis Township is adjacent to the south.

== Demographics ==
As of the census of 2000, there were 618 people, 258 households, and 175 families residing in the township. The population density was 18.9 per square mile (7.3/km^{2}). There were 423 housing units at an average density of 12.9 per square mile (5.0/km^{2}). The racial makeup of the township was 96.44% White, 1.13% African American, and 2.43% from two or more races. Hispanic or Latino of any race were 1.62% of the population.

There were 258 households, out of which 27.5% had children under the age of 18 living with them, 57.4% were married couples living together, 7.4% had a female householder with no husband present, and 31.8% were non-families. 27.1% of all households were made up of individuals, and 15.5% had someone living alone who was 65 years of age or older. The average household size was 2.40 and the average family size was 2.90.

In the township the population was spread out, with 23.0% under the age of 18, 6.5% from 18 to 24, 23.9% from 25 to 44, 23.9% from 45 to 64, and 22.7% who were 65 years of age or older. The median age was 43 years. For every 100 females, there were 102.6 males. For every 100 females age 18 and over, there were 101.7 males.

The median income for a household in the township was $30,583, and the median income for a family was $36,250. Males had a median income of $30,188 versus $17,917 for females. The per capita income for the township was $14,489. About 4.9% of families and 9.5% of the population were below the poverty line, including 10.5% of those under age 18 and 8.8% of those age 65 or over.
