= Pulawski Township, Michigan =

- Civil township
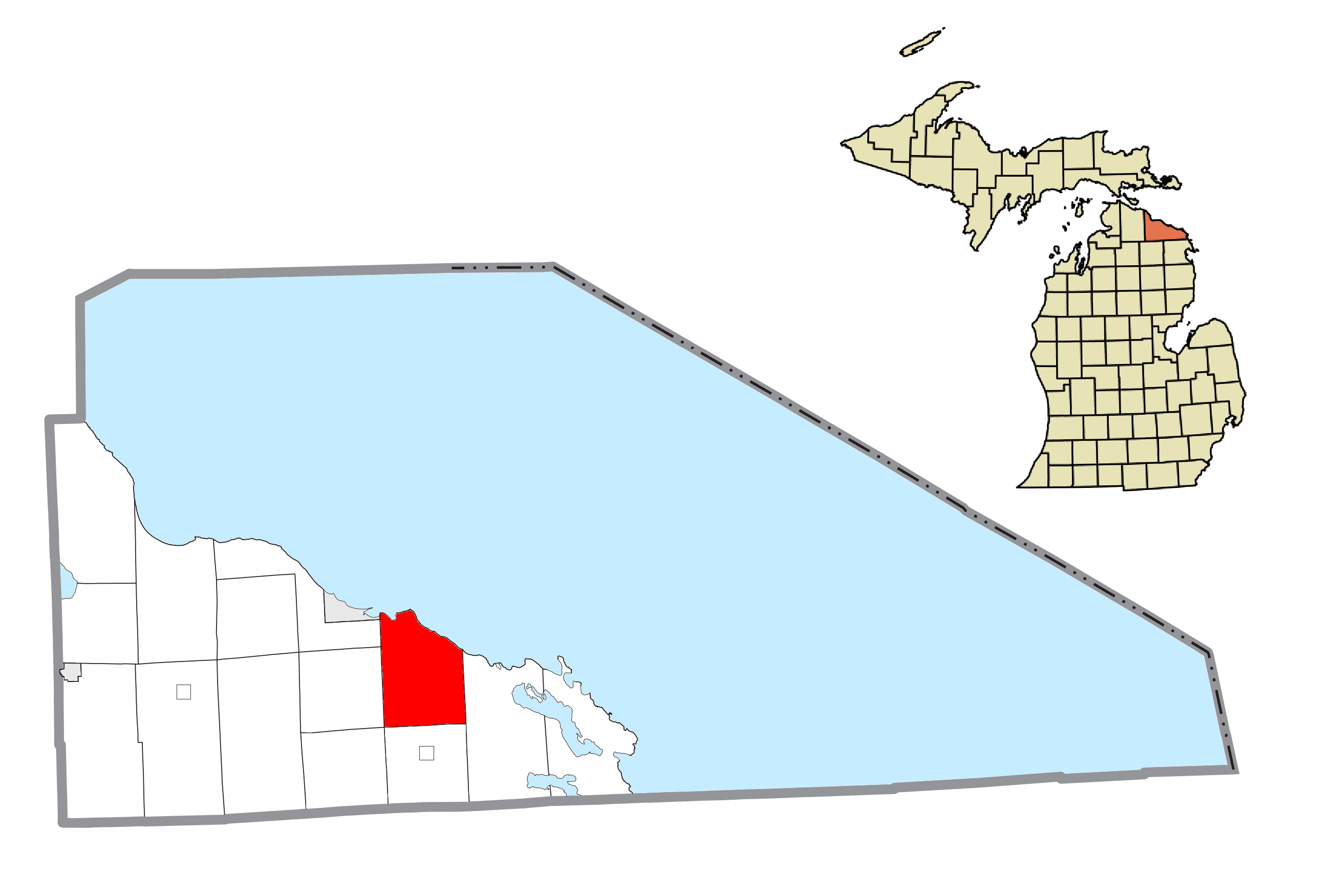
- Location within Presque Isle County

- Location within the state of Michigan Pulawski Township (the United States)
- Coordinates: 45°23′04″N 83°42′44″W
- Country: United States
- State: Michigan
- County: Presque Isle

Government
  - Supervisor: Martha Roznowski

Area
  - Total: 43.8 sq mi (113.5 km^{2})
  - Land: 41.9 sq mi (108.6 km^{2})
  - Water: 1.9 sq mi (4.9 km^{2})
- Elevation: 720 ft (220 m)

Population (2020)
  - Total: 372
  - Density: 8.87/sq mi (3.43/km^{2})
- Time zone: UTC-5 (Eastern (EST))
  - Summer (DST): UTC-4 (EDT)
- ZIP code(s): 49743, 49776, 49779
- Area code: 989
- FIPS code: 26-66460
- GNIS feature ID: 1626945

Pulawski Township is a civil township of Presque Isle County in the U.S. state of Michigan. The population was 372 at the 2020 census, 31.3% of which reported Polish ancestry. The unincorporated community of Liske is located in the township.

== Geography ==
According to the United States Census Bureau, the township has a total area of 43.8 square miles (113 km^{2}), of which 41.9 square miles (109 km^{2}) is land and 1.9 square miles (4.9 km^{2}) (4.33%) is water.

== Demographics ==
As of the census of 2000, there were 372 people, 144 households, and 108 families residing in the township. The population density was 8.9 per square mile (3.4/km^{2}). There were 196 housing units at an average density of 4.7 per square mile (1.8/km^{2}). The racial makeup of the township was 97.85% White, 1.61% Native American, and 0.54% from two or more races. The languages spoken at home in Pulawski Township are 85.2% English, 14.8% Polish, 3.9% German, and 1.3% Spanish.

There were 144 households, out of which 30.6% had children under the age of 18 living with them, 69.4% were married couples living together, 4.2% had a female householder with no husband present, and 25.0% were non-families. 20.8% of all households were made up of individuals, and 12.5% had someone living alone who was 65 years of age or older. The average household size was 2.58 and the average family size was 3.04.

In the township the population was spread out, with 23.9% under the age of 18, 7.5% from 18 to 24, 20.7% from 25 to 44, 32.5% from 45 to 64, and 15.3% who were 65 years of age or older. The median age was 42 years. For every 100 females, there were 106.7 males. For every 100 females age 18 and over, there were 106.6 males.

The median income for a household in the township was $35,192, and the median income for a family was $36,705. Males had a median income of $27,188 versus $20,833 for females. The per capita income for the township was $13,496. About 8.3% of families and 10.6% of the population were below the poverty line, including 9.7% of those under age 18 and 11.8% of those age 65 or over.
