= Liske, Michigan =

- Unincorporated community
- Location within Michigan Location within the United States
- Coordinates: 45.3341799°N 83.7411036°W
- Country: United States
- State: Michigan
- County: Presque Isle
- Elevation: 748 ft (228 m)
- Time zone: UTC-5 (Eastern (EST))
  - Summer (DST): UTC-4 (EDT)
- Area code: 989
- GNIS feature ID: 630536

Liske is an unincorporated community located in Pulawski Township, Presque Isle County, Michigan, United States. The community is eight miles south east of Rogers City, the county seat.
