= Allis Township, Michigan =

- Civil township
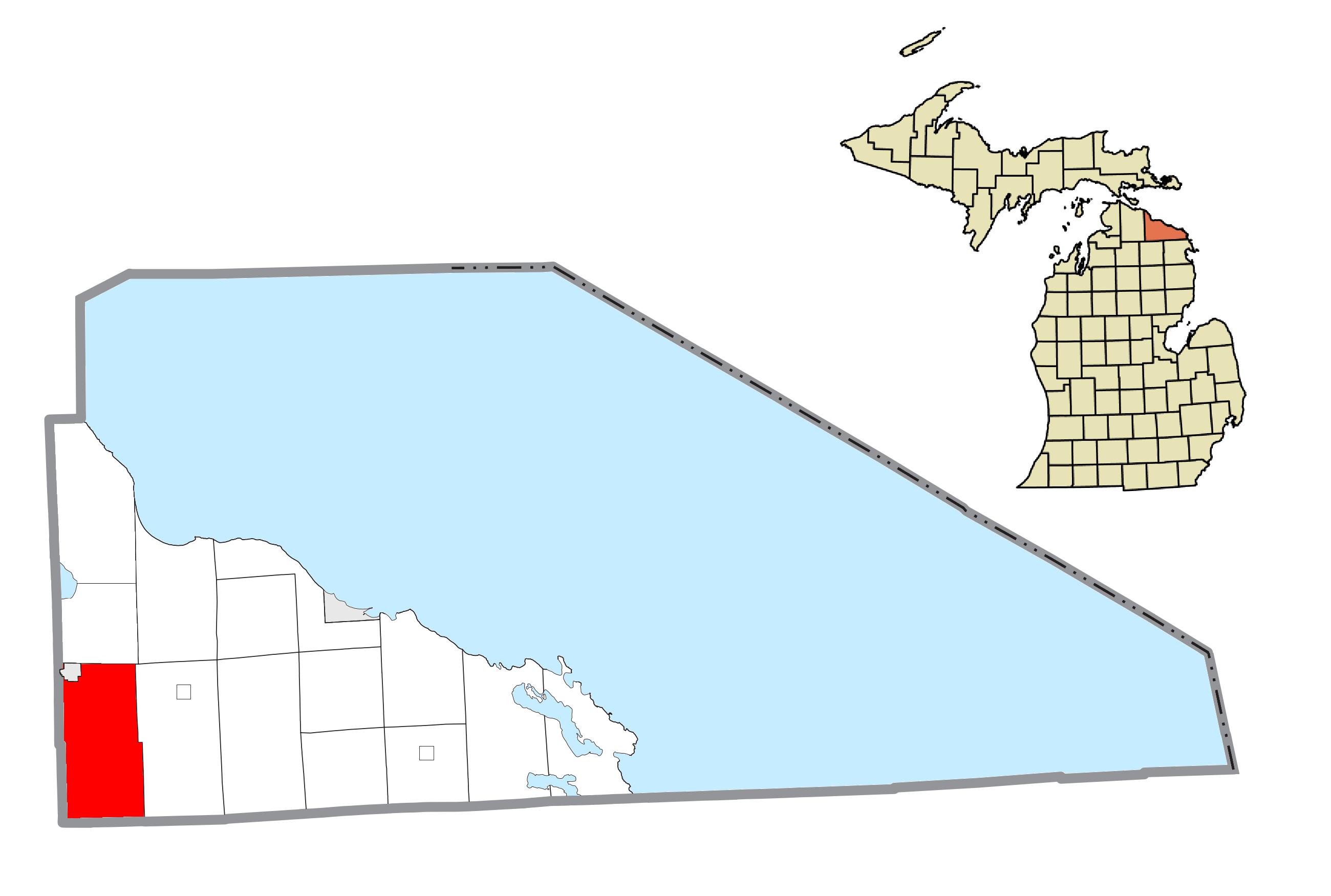
- Location within Presque Isle County

- Location within the state of Michigan Allis Township (the United States)
- Coordinates: 45°16′00″N 84°11′31″W
- Country: United States
- State: Michigan
- County: Presque Isle

Area
  - Total: 65.9 sq mi (170.8 km^{2})
  - Land: 64.6 sq mi (167.2 km^{2})
  - Water: 1.4 sq mi (3.7 km^{2})
- Elevation: 830 ft (253 m)

Population (2020)
  - Total: 925
  - Density: 14.3/sq mi (5.53/km^{2})
- Time zone: UTC-5 (Eastern (EST))
  - Summer (DST): UTC-4 (EDT)
- ZIP code(s): 49709, 49765
- Area code: 989
- FIPS code: 26-01480
- GNIS feature ID: 1625824

Allis Township is a civil township of Presque Isle County in the U.S. state of Michigan. As of the 2020 census, the township population was 925.

== Geography ==
According to the United States Census Bureau, the township has a total area of 66.0 square miles (171 km^{2}), of which 64.6 square miles (167 km^{2}) is land and 1.4 square miles (3.6 km^{2}) (2.15%) is water.

North Allis Township is adjacent to the north.

== Demographics ==
As of the census of 2000, there were 1,035 people, 394 households, and 289 families residing in the township. The population density was 16.0 inhabitants per square mile (6.2/km^{2}). There were 521 housing units at an average density of 8.1 per square mile (3.1/km^{2}). The racial makeup of the township was 97.20% White, 1.16% Native American, 0.48% Asian, 0.19% from other races, and 0.97% from two or more races. Hispanic or Latino of any race were 0.39% of the population.

There were 394 households, out of which 29.7% had children under the age of 18 living with them, 60.7% were married couples living together, 6.1% had a female householder with no husband present, and 26.4% were non-families. 21.1% of all households were made up of individuals, and 8.1% had someone living alone who was 65 years of age or older. The average household size was 2.58 and the average family size was 2.91.

In the township the population was spread out, with 24.3% under the age of 18, 7.8% from 18 to 24, 25.3% from 25 to 44, 26.9% from 45 to 64, and 15.7% who were 65 years of age or older. The median age was 40 years. For every 100 females, there were 113.0 males. For every 100 females age 18 and over, there were 107.7 males.

The median income for a household in the township was $31,477, and the median income for a family was $33,750. Males had a median income of $30,515 versus $17,656 for females. The per capita income for the township was $14,419. About 8.2% of families and 12.0% of the population were below the poverty line, including 15.6% of those under age 18 and 7.4% of those age 65 or over.
