= Belknap Township, Michigan =

- Civil township
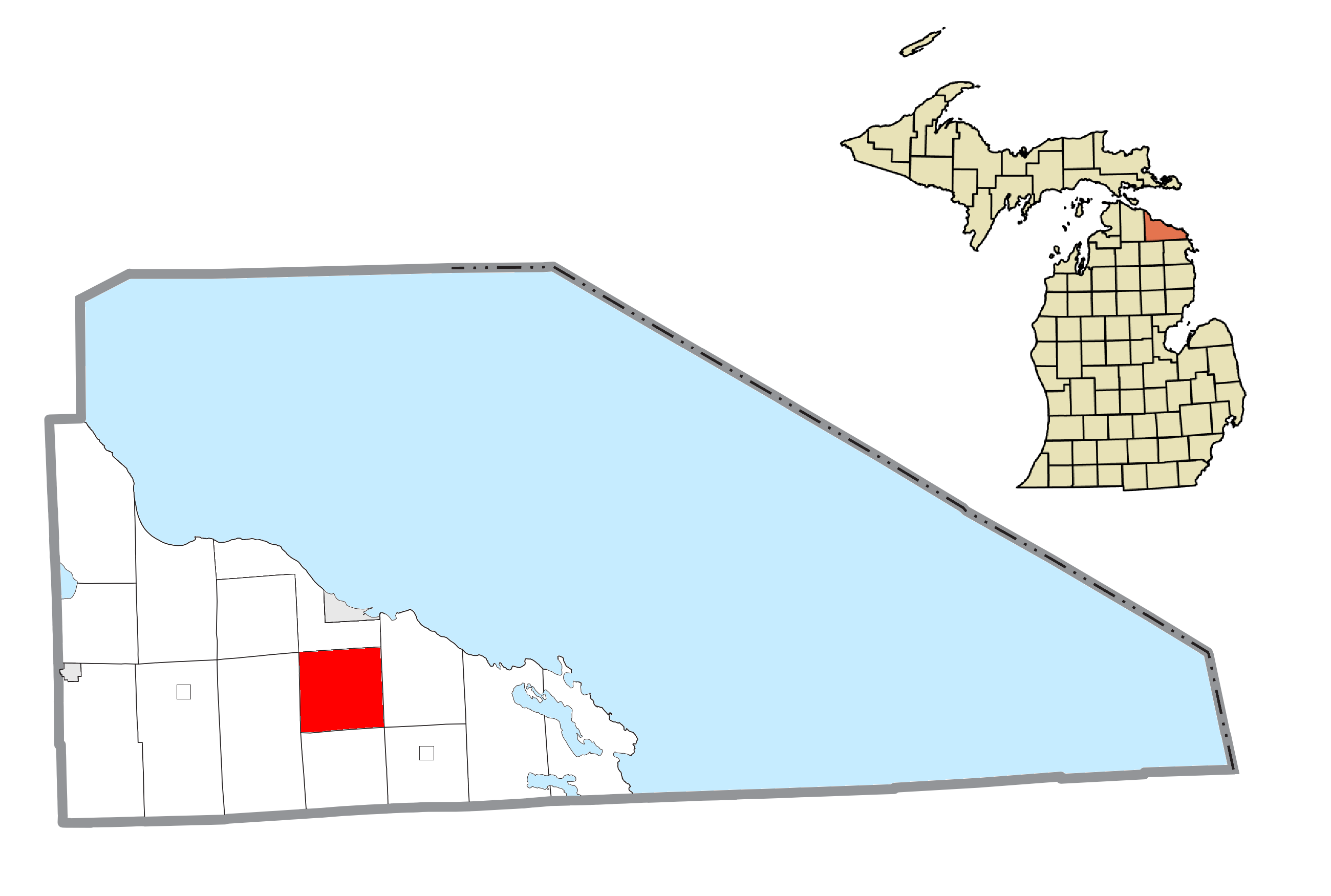
- Location within Presque Isle County

- Location within the state of Michigan Belknap Township (the United States)
- Coordinates: 45°20′49″N 83°48′55″W
- Country: United States
- State: Michigan
- County: Presque Isle

Area
  - Total: 35.8 sq mi (92.8 km^{2})
  - Land: 35.8 sq mi (92.7 km^{2})
  - Water: 0 sq mi (0.0 km^{2})
- Elevation: 774 ft (236 m)

Population (2020)
  - Total: 686
  - Density: 19.2/sq mi (7.40/km^{2})
- Time zone: UTC-5 (Eastern (EST))
  - Summer (DST): UTC-4 (EDT)
- ZIP code(s): 49743, 49779
- Area code: 989
- FIPS code: 26-06920
- GNIS feature ID: 1625908
- Website: https://belknaptownship.org/

Belknap Township is a civil township of Presque Isle County in the U.S. state of Michigan. As of the 2020 census, the township population was 686. The unincorporated community of Hagensville is located in the township.

== Geography ==
According to the United States Census Bureau, the township has a total area of 35.8 square miles (93 km^{2}), of which 35.8 square miles (93 km^{2}) is land and 0.04 square miles (0.10 km^{2}) (0.06%) is water.

== Demographics ==
As of the census of 2000, there were 854 people, 336 households, and 239 families residing in the township. The population density was 23.9 inhabitants per square mile (9.2/km^{2}). There were 397 housing units at an average density of 11.1 per square mile (4.3/km^{2}). The racial makeup of the township was 98.48% White, 1.05% Native American, 0.12% Asian, 0.12% from other races, and 0.23% from two or more races. Hispanic or Latino of any race were 0.35% of the population.

There were 336 households, out of which 28.6% had children under the age of 18 living with them, 61.9% were married couples living together, 7.1% had a female householder with no husband present, and 28.6% were non-families. 25.6% of all households were made up of individuals, and 13.7% had someone living alone who was 65 years of age or older. The average household size was 2.51 and the average family size was 3.04.

In the township the population was spread out, with 23.3% under the age of 18, 5.6% from 18 to 24, 24.8% from 25 to 44, 27.5% from 45 to 64, and 18.7% who were 65 years of age or older. The median age was 42 years. For every 100 females, there were 100.0 males. For every 100 females age 18 and over, there were 104.0 males.

The median income for a household in the township was $31,875, and the median income for a family was $37,386. Males had a median income of $28,942 versus $19,722 for females. The per capita income for the township was $14,409. About 4.5% of families and 7.7% of the population were below the poverty line, including 6.7% of those under age 18 and 14.4% of those age 65 or over.
