= Crawfords Quarry, Michigan =

Former settlement in Michigan, US

Coordinates: 45°24′30″N 83°47′10″W

Crawfords Quarry was a former settlement in Michigan, United States. It was established in 1864, and abandoned in 1900. In 1910 the location was resettled with the new name of Calcite. It is now within the city boundaries of Rogers City, Michigan.

== Sources ==
- Romig, Walter, Michigan Place Names, p. 138
