= Presque Isle County, Michigan =

County in Michigan, United States

- County
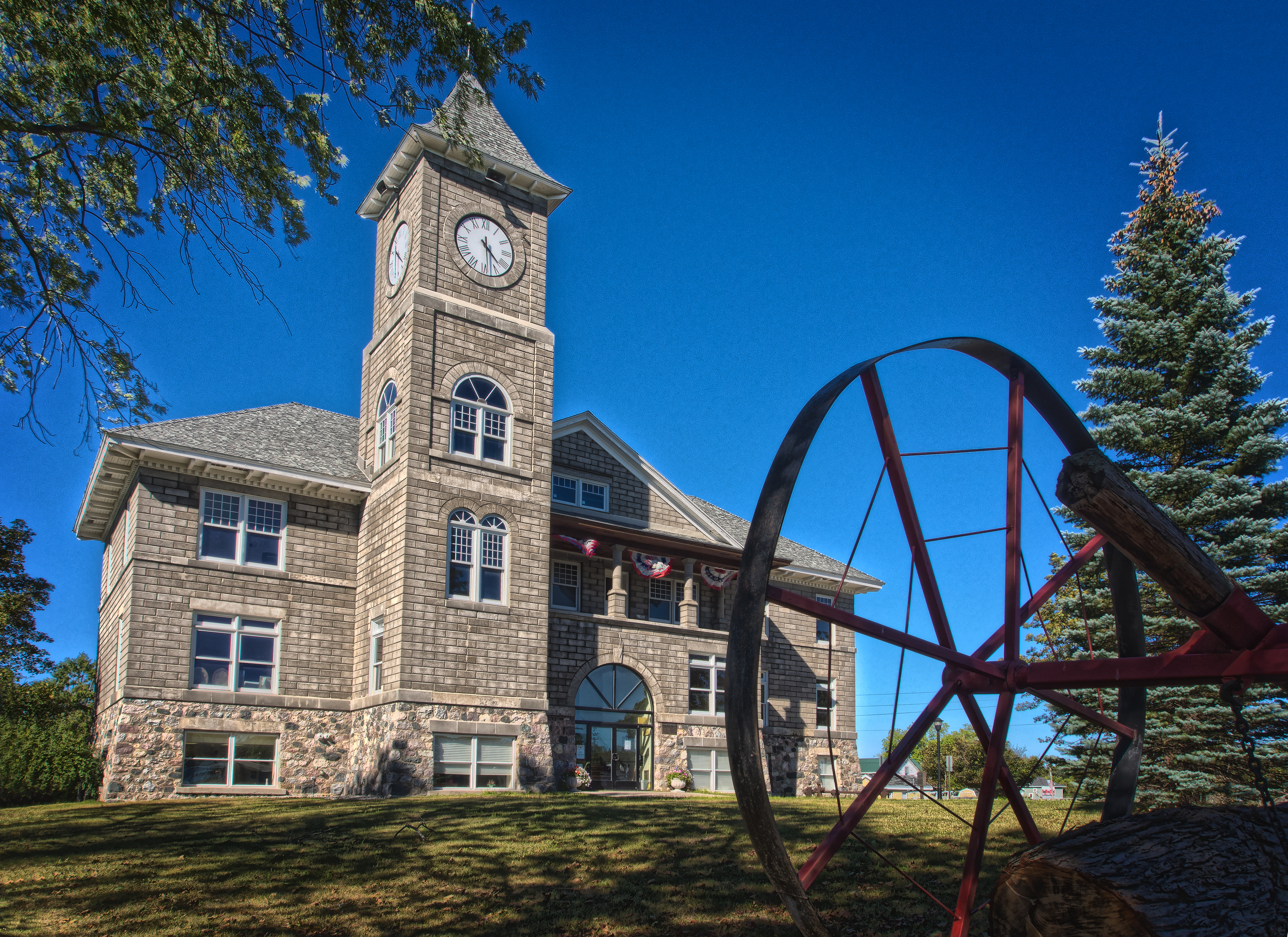
- Presque Isle County Courthouse in Onaway

- Seal

- Location within the U.S. state of Michigan
- Coordinates: 45°19′N 83°28′W
- Country: United States
- State: Michigan
- Created: 1840
- Organized: 1871
- Reorganized: 1875
- Seat: Rogers City
- Largest city: Rogers City

Area
  - Total: 2,573 sq mi (6,660 km^{2})
  - Land: 659 sq mi (1,710 km^{2})
  - Water: 1,914 sq mi (4,960 km^{2}) 74%

Population (2020)
  - Total: 12,982
  - Estimate (2025): 13,128 ▲
  - Density: 19.7/sq mi (7.61/km^{2})
- Time zone: UTC−5 (Eastern)
  - Summer (DST): UTC−4 (EDT)
- Congressional district: 1st
- Website: presqueislecounty.org

Presque Isle County (/ˈprɛskiːl/ PRESK-eel) is a county in the Lower Peninsula of the U.S. State of Michigan. As of the 2020 census, the population was 12,982. The county seat is Rogers City. The county was authorized by State legislation on April 1, 1840, but the county government was not established until 1871. The government was reorganized in 1875. The name is an anglicisation of the French word presqu'île or presque-isle, which means a specific kind of peninsula with a very narrow isthmus or connection to another landform, denominated a "presque-isle", i. e., literally "almost an island". A large part of Presque Isle Township consists of that peninsula, with Lake Huron on the east, Grand Lake on the west, and narrow strips of land connecting it to the mainland at the north and south ends. The community of Presque Isle is near the center of this peninsula.

== History ==
Early Native Americans living in the area were nomadic, using the land as hunting grounds. To them the land between the Ocqueoc and Swan Rivers was sacred ground. The name "Presque Isle" was given to the area by French fur traders who portaged over the strip of land that attaches Presque Isle to the mainland.

Early development of the area was delayed because it lacked a navigable river. The Ocqueoc River was Presque Isle's largest river yet was shallow and crooked, and had many rapids. In the spring of 1839 a surveying party, contracted by the State of Michigan, reported that the land of this area was worthless. This further discouraged development until the 1860s when the Crawford family settled into a quiet cove of Lake Huron, south of modern Rogers City. They intended to develop a stone quarry, but found the stone too flaky to be used as building material. Turning to lumbering, they sold the wood to steamers traveling the Great Lakes.

In 1868 William Evans Rogers, an Army officer, organized a surveying party to Presque Isle, with Albert Molitor as supervisor. Seeing the vast forests, they attempted to purchase Crawford's Quarry but were refused. They formed the Molitor-Rogers Company and purchased the land at the future site of Rogers City. The following year a large party of German and Polish immigrants arrived and settled in the area. The Molitor-Rogers Company built a sawmill, store, boarding house, and blacksmith shop. Only the Company supplied the small city. After a difficult winter in 1870–71, the community began to thrive. Molitor came to be seen as a despot by many residents and was assassinated in 1875.

The county's original settlers were lumbermen, fishermen, and farmers. In 1907 a mining engineer/geologist from New York, H. H. Hindshaw, visited Crawford's Quarry and found it to be rich in limestone. Following this discovery, the Michigan Limestone and Chemical Company of Calcite, Michigan was founded. The company purchased 8,000 acres (32 km^{2}) at Calcite, the new name for Crawford's Quarry. Needing a means of shipping their product, the Bradley Transportation Company was formed. The company is known in the area for being the chief business, employing a significant portion of the residents. One of the darker aspects of the county's history involved the loss of one of the Bradley Transportation Company's cargo ships, the Carl D. Bradley, which sank on Lake Michigan during a windstorm in November 1958, taking 33 lives, 28 of whom resided in Presque Isle County (23 were from Rogers City, three were from Onaway, and two were from Posen or Metz Township). (Note: The uncensored Coast Guard report was found in the appendix of Mayday! by James Hopp.)

Today the world's largest limestone processing plant is in Rogers City, which is also a major Great Lakes port. This is the best natural harbor on Lake Huron between Port Huron and Mackinaw City.

== Geography ==
According to the U.S. Census Bureau, the county has an area of 2,573 square miles (6,660 km^{2}), of which 659 square miles (1,710 km^{2}) is land and 1,914 square miles (4,960 km^{2}) (74%) is water. Although Presque Isle County is on Michigan's Lower Peninsula, it is considered to be part of Northern Michigan.

=== Geographic features ===
- Ocqueoc Falls
- Sacred Rock

=== Lakes ===
- Grand Lake (Presque Isle, Michigan)
- Black Lake
- Rainy Lake

=== Adjacent counties ===
By land

- Alpena County (southeast)
- Montmorency County (southwest)
- Cheboygan County (west)

By water

- Mackinac County (northwest)
- Chippewa County (north)
- Manitoulin District, Ontario, Canada (east)

== Communities ==
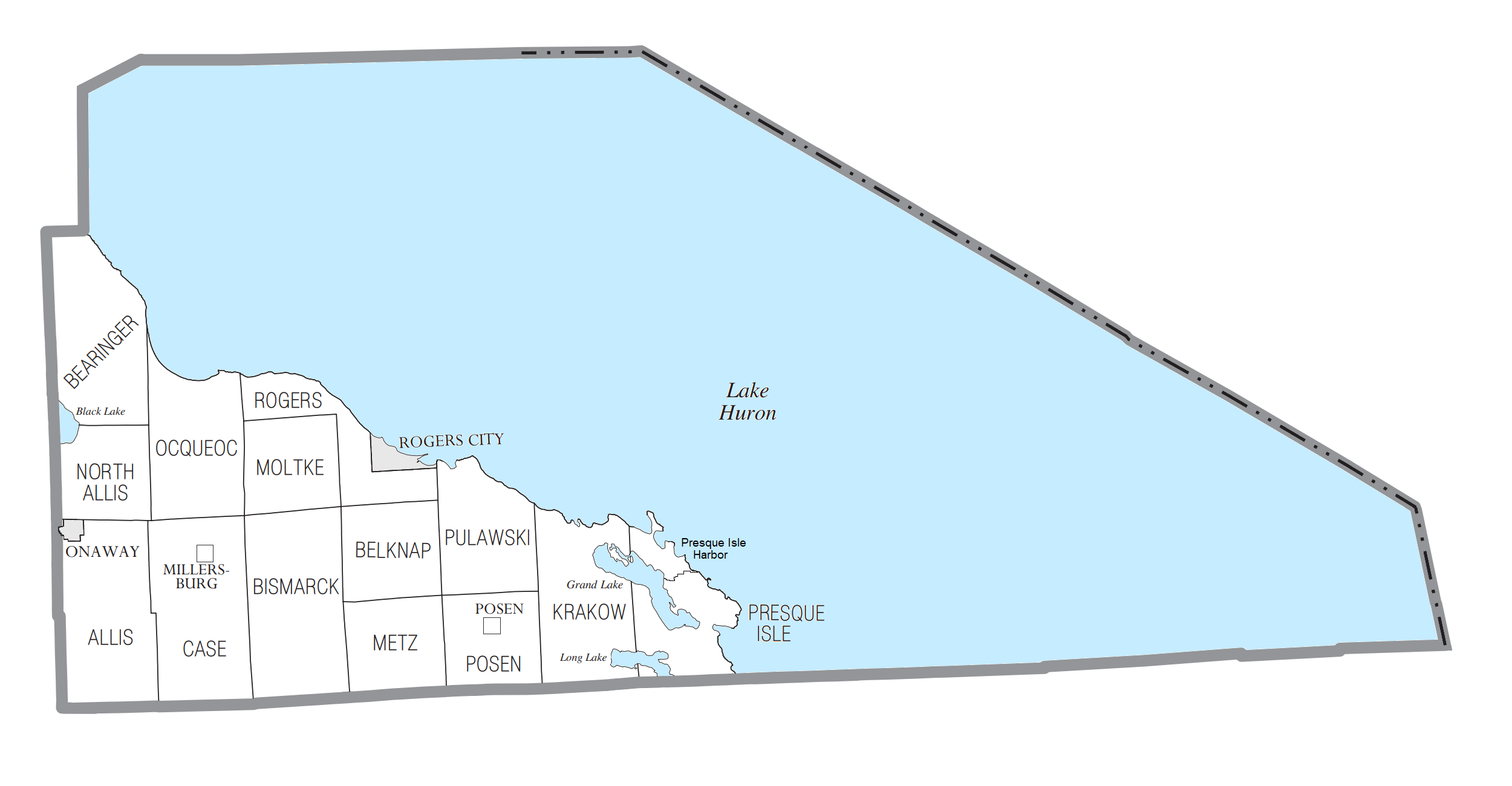
U.S. Census data map showing local municipal boundaries within Presque Isle County, as well as the CDP of Presque Isle Harbor. Shaded areas represent incorporated cities.

=== Cities ===
- Onaway
- Rogers City (county seat)

=== Villages ===
- Millersburg
- Posen

=== Civil townships ===
- Allis Township
- Bearinger Township
- Belknap Township
- Bismarck Township
- Case Township
- Krakow Township
- Metz Township
- Moltke Township
- North Allis Township
- Ocqueoc Township
- Posen Township
- Presque Isle Township
- Pulawski Township
- Rogers Township

=== Census-designated place ===
- Presque Isle Harbor

=== Other unincorporated communities ===
- Hawks
- Leroy
- Liske
- Manitou Beach
- Metz

== Demographics ==
Historical population
| Census | Pop. | Note | %± |
|---|---|---|---|
| 1860 | 26 | | — |
| 1870 | 355 | | 1,265.4% |
| 1880 | 3,113 | | 776.9% |
| 1890 | 4,687 | | 50.6% |
| 1900 | 8,821 | | 88.2% |
| 1910 | 11,249 | | 27.5% |
| 1920 | 12,131 | | 7.8% |
| 1930 | 11,330 | | −6.6% |
| 1940 | 12,250 | | 8.1% |
| 1950 | 11,996 | | −2.1% |
| 1960 | 13,117 | | 9.3% |
| 1970 | 12,836 | | −2.1% |
| 1980 | 14,267 | | 11.1% |
| 1990 | 13,743 | | −3.7% |
| 2000 | 14,411 | | 4.9% |
| 2010 | 13,376 | | −7.2% |
| 2020 | 12,982 | | −2.9% |
| 2025 (est.) | 13,128 | ▲ | 1.1% |
US Decennial Census; 1790-1960 1900-1990; 1990-2000 2010-2018

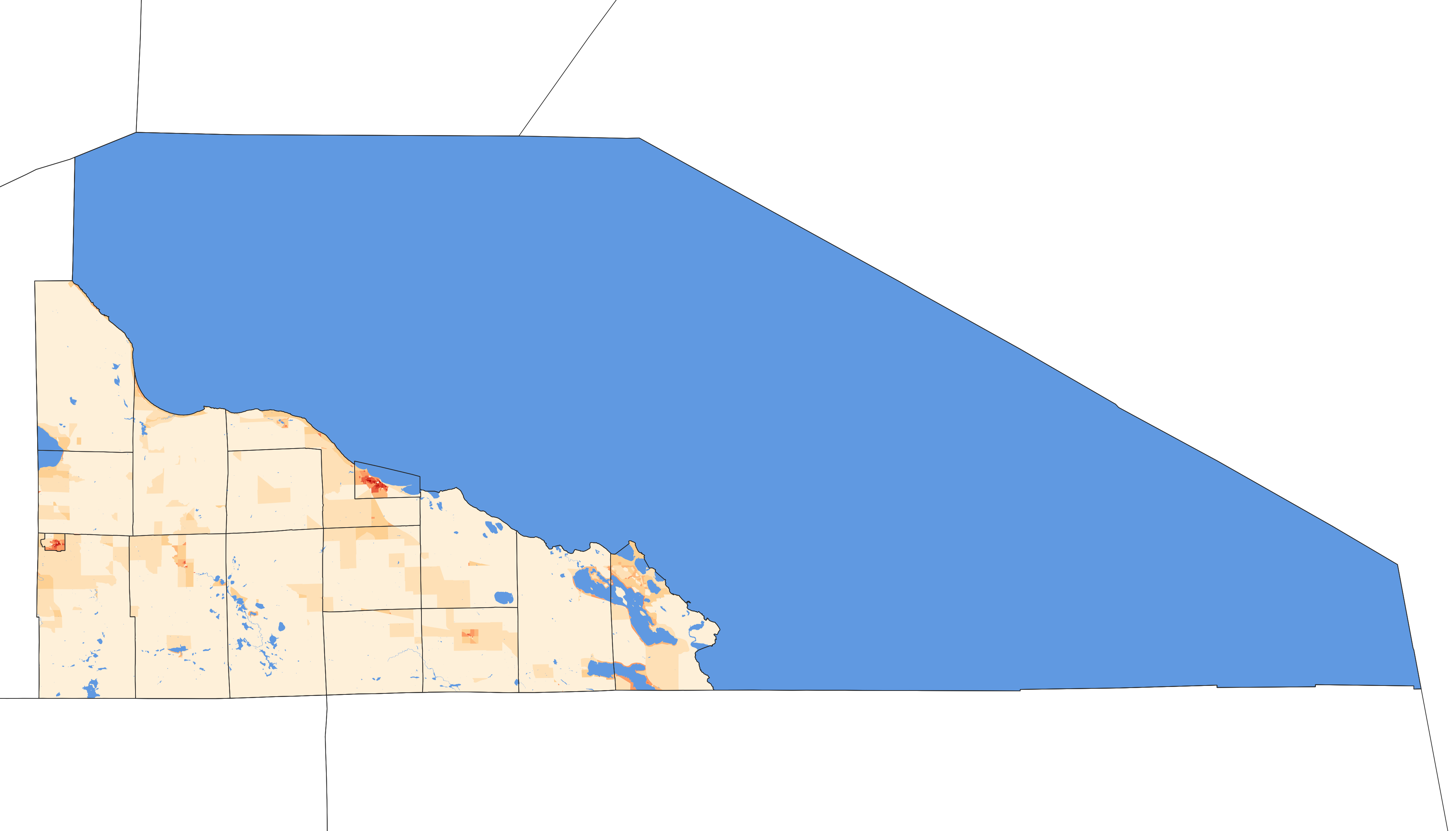
2020 population density of Presque Isle County MI by census block

=== Racial and ethnic composition ===
Presque Isle County, Michigan – Racial and ethnic composition Note: the US Census treats Hispanic/Latino as an ethnic category. This table excludes Latinos from the racial categories and assigns them to a separate category. Hispanics/Latinos may be of any race.
| Race / Ethnicity (NH = Non-Hispanic) | Pop 1980 | Pop 1990 | Pop 2000 | Pop 2010 | Pop 2020 | % 1980 | % 1990 | % 2000 | % 2010 | % 2020 |
|---|---|---|---|---|---|---|---|---|---|---|
| White alone (NH) | 14,146 | 13,622 | 14,079 | 12,972 | 12,282 | 99.15% | 99.12% | 97.70% | 96.98% | 94.61% |
| Black or African American alone (NH) | 6 | 11 | 37 | 56 | 28 | 0.04% | 0.08% | 0.26% | 0.42% | 0.22% |
| Native American or Alaska Native alone (NH) | 40 | 43 | 83 | 79 | 67 | 0.28% | 0.31% | 0.58% | 0.59% | 0.52% |
| Asian alone (NH) | 30 | 30 | 22 | 40 | 52 | 0.21% | 0.22% | 0.15% | 0.30% | 0.40% |
| Native Hawaiian or Pacific Islander alone (NH) | x | x | 0 | 1 | 0 | x | x | 0.00% | 0.01% | 0.00% |
| Other race alone (NH) | 7 | 0 | 3 | 1 | 26 | 0.05% | 0.00% | 0.02% | 0.01% | 0.20% |
| Mixed race or Multiracial (NH) | x | x | 108 | 111 | 373 | x | x | 0.75% | 0.83% | 2.87% |
| Hispanic or Latino (any race) | 38 | 37 | 79 | 116 | 154 | 0.27% | 0.27% | 0.55% | 0.87% | 1.19% |
| Total | 14,267 | 13,743 | 14,411 | 13,376 | 12,982 | 100.00% | 100.00% | 100.00% | 100.00% | 100.00% |

=== 2020 census ===
As of the 2020 census, the county had a population of 12,982 and a median age of 56.1 years. 15.4% of residents were under the age of 18 and 32.9% of residents were 65 years of age or older. For every 100 females there were 100.7 males, and for every 100 females age 18 and over there were 100.7 males age 18 and over.

The racial makeup of the county was 95.1% White, 0.3% Black or African American, 0.5% American Indian and Alaska Native, 0.4% Asian, <0.1% Native Hawaiian and Pacific Islander, 0.3% from some other race, and 3.4% from two or more races. Hispanic or Latino residents of any race comprised 1.2% of the population.

<0.1% of residents lived in urban areas, while 100.0% lived in rural areas.

There were 6,047 households in the county, of which 17.5% had children under the age of 18 living in them. Of all households, 51.1% were married-couple households, 21.3% were households with a male householder and no spouse or partner present, and 21.8% were households with a female householder and no spouse or partner present. About 33.1% of all households were made up of individuals and 17.7% had someone living alone who was 65 years of age or older.

There were 9,804 housing units, of which 38.3% were vacant. Among occupied housing units, 86.3% were owner-occupied and 13.7% were renter-occupied. The homeowner vacancy rate was 1.9% and the rental vacancy rate was 10.1%.

=== 2000 census ===
At the 2000 United States census, there were 14,411 people, 6,155 households, and 4,203 families residing in the county.

As of 2000, the median income for a household in the county was $31,656, and the median income for a family was $37,426. Males had a median income of $31,275 versus $20,625 for females. The per capita income for the county was $17,363. About 6.80% of families and 10.30% of the population were below the poverty line, including 13.10% of those under age 18 and 9.20% of those over age 64.

== Government ==
Voters in Presque Isle County have generally favored Republican Party nominees. Since 1884, the Republican nominee has garnered the county's vote 72% of the time (26 of 36 elections).

United States presidential election results for Presque Isle County, Michigan
| Year | Republican | | Democratic | | Third party(ies) | |
| Year | No. | % | No. | % | No. | % |
|---|---|---|---|---|---|---|
| 1884 | 394 | 63.65% | 225 | 36.35% | 0 | 0.00% |
| 1888 | 408 | 45.18% | 484 | 53.60% | 11 | 1.22% |
| 1892 | 290 | 34.77% | 471 | 56.47% | 73 | 8.75% |
| 1896 | 763 | 66.06% | 371 | 32.12% | 21 | 1.82% |
| 1900 | 1,328 | 71.67% | 496 | 26.77% | 29 | 1.57% |
| 1904 | 1,861 | 82.93% | 363 | 16.18% | 20 | 0.89% |
| 1908 | 1,706 | 81.39% | 301 | 14.36% | 89 | 4.25% |
| 1912 | 729 | 37.42% | 259 | 13.30% | 960 | 49.28% |
| 1916 | 1,407 | 61.52% | 806 | 35.24% | 74 | 3.24% |
| 1920 | 2,522 | 80.76% | 525 | 16.81% | 76 | 2.43% |
| 1924 | 2,315 | 67.45% | 431 | 12.56% | 686 | 19.99% |
| 1928 | 1,992 | 65.50% | 1,029 | 33.84% | 20 | 0.66% |
| 1932 | 1,560 | 40.36% | 2,217 | 57.36% | 88 | 2.28% |
| 1936 | 1,621 | 35.20% | 2,905 | 63.08% | 79 | 1.72% |
| 1940 | 2,552 | 49.46% | 2,595 | 50.29% | 13 | 0.25% |
| 1944 | 2,209 | 51.21% | 2,092 | 48.49% | 13 | 0.30% |
| 1948 | 2,271 | 54.53% | 1,872 | 44.95% | 22 | 0.53% |
| 1952 | 2,982 | 61.84% | 1,825 | 37.85% | 15 | 0.31% |
| 1956 | 3,058 | 61.43% | 1,917 | 38.51% | 3 | 0.06% |
| 1960 | 2,950 | 52.66% | 2,649 | 47.29% | 3 | 0.05% |
| 1964 | 1,770 | 33.16% | 3,565 | 66.80% | 2 | 0.04% |
| 1968 | 2,565 | 48.85% | 2,300 | 43.80% | 386 | 7.35% |
| 1972 | 3,372 | 56.23% | 2,440 | 40.69% | 185 | 3.08% |
| 1976 | 3,545 | 51.02% | 3,334 | 47.99% | 69 | 0.99% |
| 1980 | 3,486 | 50.43% | 2,952 | 42.71% | 474 | 6.86% |
| 1984 | 4,207 | 62.57% | 2,481 | 36.90% | 36 | 0.54% |
| 1988 | 3,614 | 54.11% | 3,025 | 45.29% | 40 | 0.60% |
| 1992 | 2,398 | 32.65% | 3,308 | 45.04% | 1,639 | 22.31% |
| 1996 | 2,463 | 35.74% | 3,449 | 50.04% | 980 | 14.22% |
| 2000 | 3,660 | 51.69% | 3,242 | 45.79% | 178 | 2.51% |
| 2004 | 3,982 | 52.98% | 3,432 | 45.66% | 102 | 1.36% |
| 2008 | 3,606 | 48.01% | 3,722 | 49.55% | 183 | 2.44% |
| 2012 | 3,794 | 53.45% | 3,192 | 44.97% | 112 | 1.58% |
| 2016 | 4,488 | 61.84% | 2,400 | 33.07% | 369 | 5.08% |
| 2020 | 5,342 | 63.94% | 2,911 | 34.84% | 102 | 1.22% |
| 2024 | 5,568 | 63.69% | 3,036 | 34.73% | 138 | 1.58% |

United States Senate election results for Presque Isle County, Michigan1
| Year | Republican | | Democratic | | Third party(ies) | |
| Year | No. | % | No. | % | No. | % |
|---|---|---|---|---|---|---|
| 2024 | 5,391 | 62.64% | 2,992 | 34.77% | 223 | 2.59% |

Michigan Gubernatorial election results for Presque Isle County
| Year | Republican | | Democratic | | Third party(ies) | |
| Year | No. | % | No. | % | No. | % |
|---|---|---|---|---|---|---|
| 2022 | 4,165 | 57.07% | 2,981 | 40.85% | 152 | 2.08% |

The county government operates the jail, maintains rural roads, operates the major local courts, records deeds, mortgages, and vital records, administers public health regulations, and participates with the state in the provision of social services. The county board of commissioners controls the budget and has limited authority to make laws or ordinances. In Michigan, most local government functions – police and fire, building and zoning, tax assessment, street maintenance etc. – are the responsibility of individual cities and townships.

=== Elected officials ===
- Prosecuting Attorney: Kenneth A. Radzibon
- Sheriff: Joseph Brewbaker
- County Clerk: Ann Marie Main
- County Treasurer: Bridget LaLonde
- Register of Deeds: Vicky Kowalewsky
- Drain Commissioner: Robert G. Macomber
- County Surveyor: Norman J. Quaine Jr.

as of June 2021

== Historical markers ==
There are ten recognized Michigan historical markers in the county:

- Bearinger Union School
- Burnham's Landing
- Elowsky Mill
- Forty Mile Point Lighthouse / Graveyard of Ships
- Lake Huron
- The Metz Fire
- Old Presque Isle Lighthouse
- Presque Isle Electric Cooperative Monument
- Presque Isle Light Station
- World's Largest Limestone Quarry

== Media ==
=== Newspapers ===
- The Alpena News is the daily newspaper of record for much of the northeastern Lower Peninsula.
- The Presque Isle County Advance is the weekly newspaper of Presque Isle County.

=== Television ===
The following television stations broadcast in Presque Isle County:

- Channel 4: WTOM-TV "TV 7&4" (NBC) (Cheboygan; satellite of WPBN-TV, Traverse City)
- Channel 6: WCML "CMU Public Television" (PBS) (Alpena; satellite of WCMU-TV, Mount Pleasant)
- Channel 8: WGTQ "ABC 29&8" (ABC) (Sault Ste. Marie; satellite of WGTU, Traverse City)
- Channel 10: WWUP-TV "9&10 News" (CBS) (Sault Ste. Marie; satellite of WWTV, Cadillac)
- Channel 11: WBKB-TV "Channel 11 News" (CBS) (Alpena)
- Channel 45: WFUP "Fox 32" (Fox) (Vanderbilt; satellite of WFQX-TV Cadillac).

=== Radio ===
The following radio stations can be heard in Rogers City

FM

| Call Sign | Frequency | City Broadcast From |
|---|---|---|
| WPHN | 90.5 | Gaylord |
| WCML | 91.7 | Alpena |
| WFDX | 92.5 | Atlanta |
| WKJZ | 94.9 | Hillman |
| WRZG | 96.7 | Rogers City |
| WHAK-FM | 99.9 | Rogers City |
| WWMK | 106.3 | Onaway |
| WHSB | 107.7 | Alpena |

AM

| Call Sign | Frequency | City Broadcast From |
|---|---|---|
| WTCM | 580 | Traverse City |
| WHAK | 960 | Rogers City |

NOAA Weather Radio

NOAA Weather Radio can be heard on 162.550 MHz (Call Sign KIG83, Alpena)

== Transportation ==
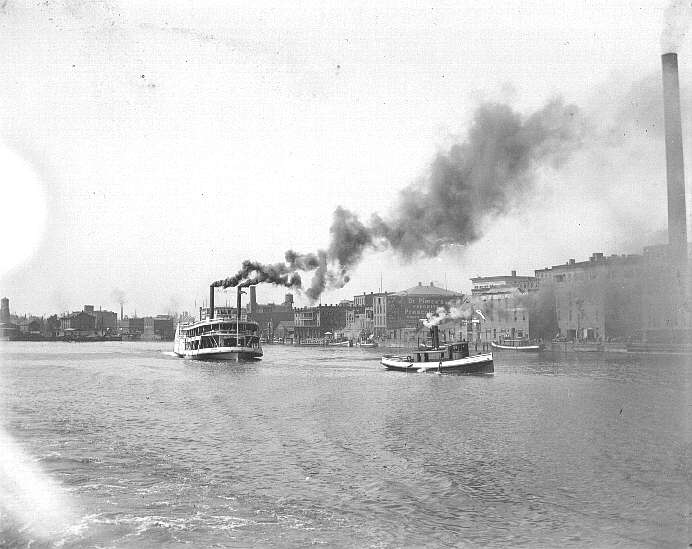
Steamer "Pastime" en route to Presque Isle

=== Air ===
There is one county-owned airport in Presque Isle County, providing access to general aviation:

- Presque Isle County Airport – located SW of Rogers City

The nearest commercial airline airports are Alpena County Regional Airport near Alpena, and Cherry Capital Airport near (Traverse City).

=== Major highways ===
- US 23
- Bus. US 23
- M-33
- M-65
- M-68
- M-211
- F-21

== See also ==
- List of Michigan State Historic Sites in Presque Isle County
- National Register of Historic Places listings in Presque Isle County, Michigan
