= Bearinger Township, Michigan =

- Civil township
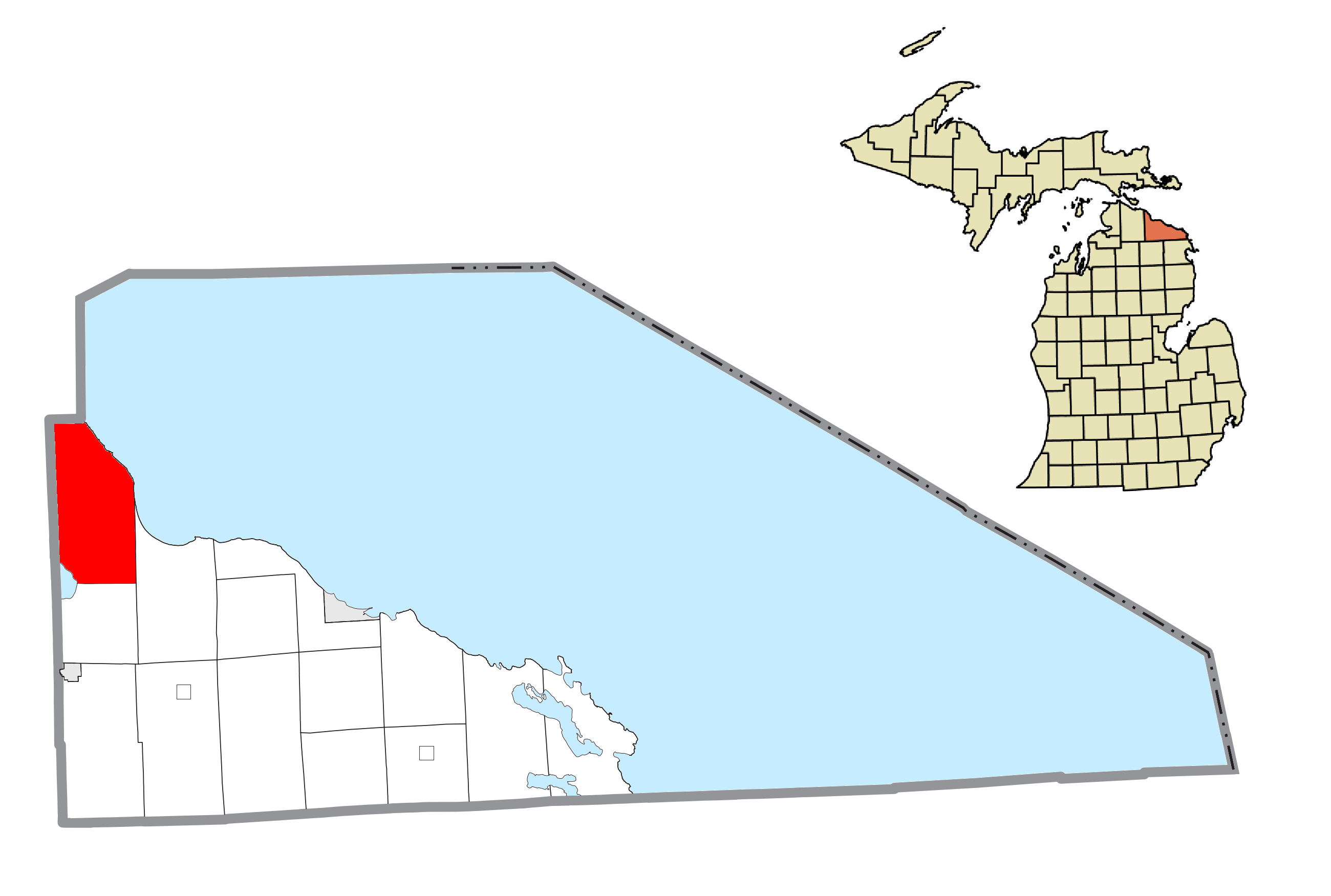
- Location within Presque Isle County

- Location within the state of Michigan Bearinger Township (the United States)
- Coordinates: 45°32′14″N 84°12′20″W
- Country: United States
- State: Michigan
- County: Presque Isle

Area
  - Total: 63.6 sq mi (164.7 km^{2})
  - Land: 61.5 sq mi (159.2 km^{2})
  - Water: 2.1 sq mi (5.5 km^{2})
- Elevation: 690 ft (210 m)

Population (2020)
  - Total: 371
  - Density: 6.04/sq mi (2.33/km^{2})
- Time zone: UTC-5 (Eastern (EST))
  - Summer (DST): UTC-4 (EDT)
- ZIP code(s): 49759, 49765
- Area code: 989
- FIPS code: 26-06400
- GNIS feature ID: 1625896
- Website: https://bearingertownship.org/

Bearinger Township is a civil township of Presque Isle County in the U.S. state of Michigan. As of the 2020 census, the township population was 371.

== Geography ==
According to the United States Census Bureau, the township has a total area of 63.6 square miles (165 km^{2}), of which 61.5 square miles (159 km^{2}) is land and 2.1 square miles (5.4 km^{2}) (3.32%) is water.

== Demographics ==
As of the census of 2010, there were 369 people, 177 households, and 127 families residing in the township. The population density was 6.0 inhabitants per square mile (2.3/km^{2}). There were 555 housing units at an average density of 9.02 per square mile (3.48/km^{2}). The racial makeup of the township was 97.6% White, 0.01% Native American, 0.0% Asian, 0.01% from other races, and 0.002% from two or more races. Hispanic or Latino of any race were 1.08% of the population.

There were 177 households, out of which 21.0% had children under the age of 18 living with them, 64.4% were married couples living together, 5.6% had a female householder with no husband present, and 30.0% were non-families. 28.2% of all households were made up of individuals, and 12.7% had someone living alone who was 65 years of age or older. The average household size was 2.08 and the average family size was 2.44.

In the township the population was spread out, with 18.2% under the age of 18, 3.3% from 18 to 24, 14.4% from 25 to 44, 38.5% from 45 to 64, and 28.9% who were 65 years of age or older. The median age was 58.4 years. For every 100 females, there were 100.6 males. For every 100 females age 18 and over, there were 105.8 males.

The median income for a household in the township was $45,000, and the median income for a family was $48,125. Males had a median income of $35,500 versus $25,625 for females. The per capita income for the township was $21,195. About 7.0% of families and 10.9% of the population were below the poverty line, including 0.0% of those under age 18 and 6.0% of those age 65 or over.
