= Moltke Township, Michigan =

- Civil township
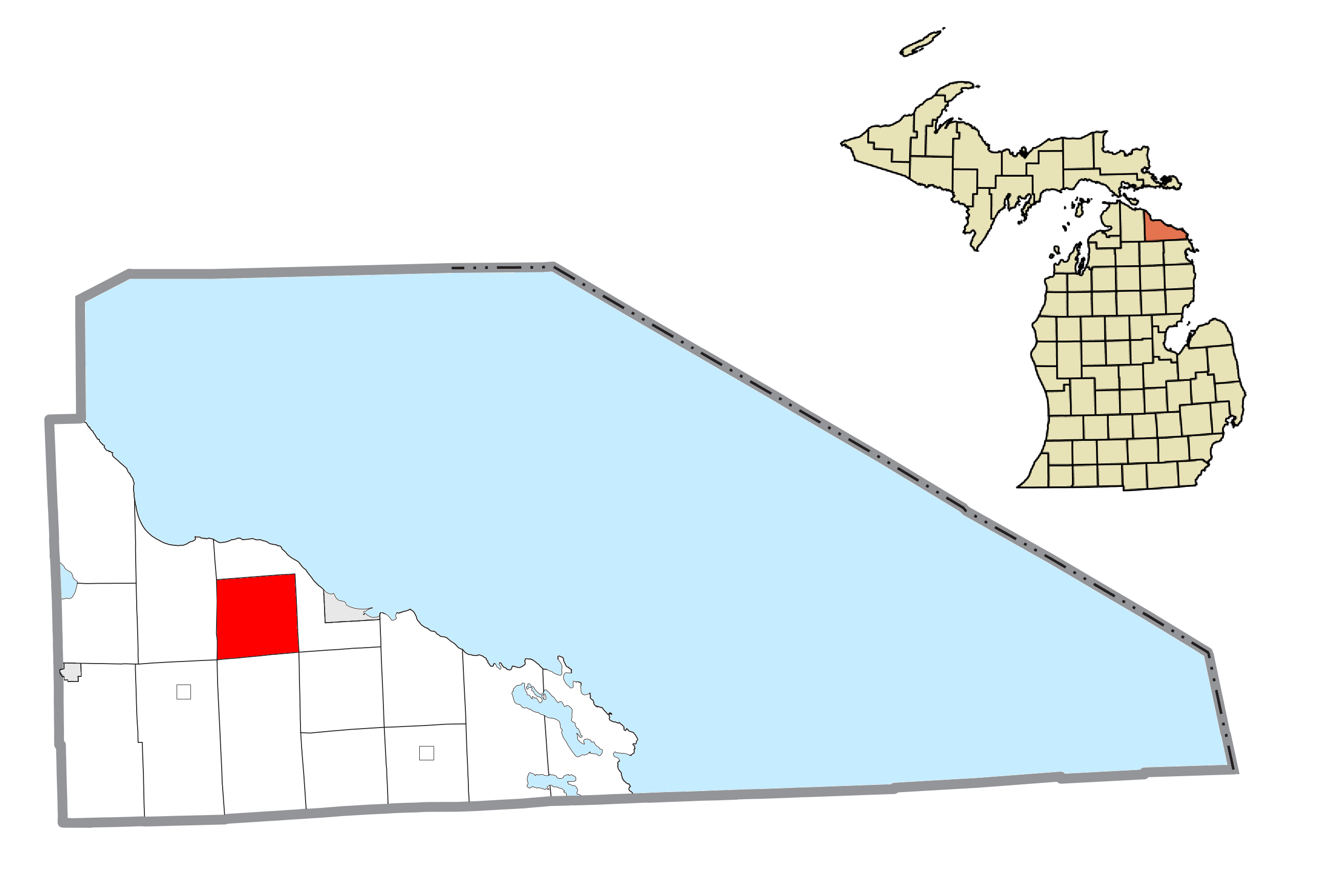
- Location within Presque Isle County

- Location within the state of Michigan Moltke Township (the United States)
- Coordinates: 45°23′42″N 83°58′01″W
- Country: United States
- State: Michigan
- County: Presque Isle

Area
  - Total: 33.9 sq mi (88 km^{2})
  - Land: 33.9 sq mi (88 km^{2})
  - Water: 0.0 sq mi (0 km^{2})
- Elevation: 860 ft (262 m)

Population (2020)
  - Total: 291
  - Density: 8.58/sq mi (3.31/km^{2})
- Time zone: UTC-5 (Eastern (EST))
  - Summer (DST): UTC-4 (EDT)
- ZIP code(s): 49779
- Area code: 989
- FIPS code: 26-54860
- GNIS feature ID: 1626752

Moltke Township is a civil township of Presque Isle County in the U.S. state of Michigan. The population was 352 at the 2000 census and went down to 291 in 2020 census.

== Geography ==
According to the United States Census Bureau, the township has a total area of 34.0 square miles (88 km^{2}), of which 34.0 square miles (88 km^{2}) is land and 0.03% is water.

== Demographics ==
As of the census of 2000, there were 352 people, 138 households, and 100 families residing in the township. The population density was 10.4 per square mile (4.0/km^{2}). There were 179 housing units at an average density of 5.3 per square mile (2.0/km^{2}). The racial makeup of the township was 98.30% White, 1.42% African American and 0.28% Native American.

There were 138 households, out of which 27.5% had children under the age of 18 living with them, 64.5% were married couples living together, 4.3% had a female householder with no husband present, and 27.5% were non-families. 25.4% of all households were made up of individuals, and 13.0% had someone living alone who was 65 years of age or older. The average household size was 2.55 and the average family size was 3.02.

In the township the population was spread out, with 25.9% under the age of 18, 4.8% from 18 to 24, 23.0% from 25 to 44, 32.7% from 45 to 64, and 13.6% who were 65 years of age or older. The median age was 43 years. For every 100 females, there were 107.1 males. For every 100 females age 18 and over, there were 107.1 males.

The median income for a household in the township was $32,083, and the median income for a family was $40,156. Males had a median income of $26,250 versus $20,278 for females. The per capita income for the township was $16,272. About 8.3% of families and 11.8% of the population were below the poverty line, including 19.5% of those under age 18 and 9.1% of those age 65 or over.
