= Case Township, Michigan =

- Civil township
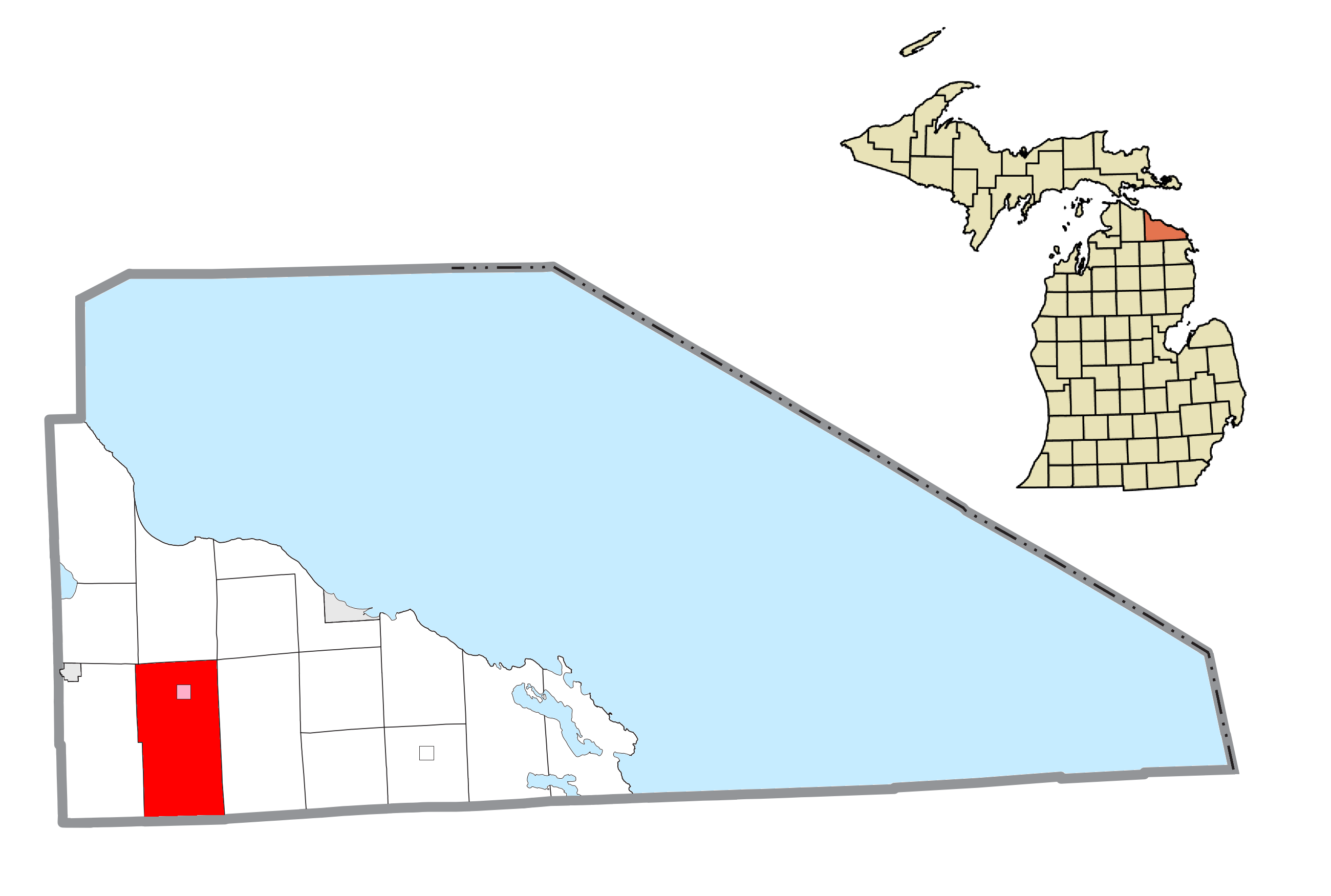
- Location within Presque Isle County (red) and the administered village of Millersburg (pink)

- Location within the state of Michigan Case Township (the United States)
- Coordinates: 45°18′46″N 84°03′36″W
- Country: United States
- State: Michigan
- County: Presque Isle

Area
  - Total: 68.3 sq mi (176.8 km^{2})
  - Land: 67.3 sq mi (174.4 km^{2})
  - Water: 0.89 sq mi (2.3 km^{2})
- Elevation: 843 ft (257 m)

Population (2020)
  - Total: 819
  - Density: 12.2/sq mi (4.70/km^{2})
- Time zone: UTC-5 (Eastern (EST))
  - Summer (DST): UTC-4 (EDT)
- ZIP code(s): 49759, 49765
- Area code: 989
- FIPS code: 26-13740
- GNIS feature ID: 1626040
- Website: https://casetownship.org/

Case Township is a civil township of Presque Isle County in the U.S. state of Michigan. The population was 819 at the 2020 census.

== Geography ==
According to the United States Census Bureau, the township has a total area of 68.2 square miles (177 km^{2}), of which 67.3 square miles (174 km^{2}) is land and 0.9 square miles (2.3 km^{2}) (1.30%) is water.

== Demographics ==
As of the census of 2000, there were 942 people, 386 households, and 277 families residing in the township. The population density was 14.0 inhabitants per square mile (5.4/km^{2}). There were 667 housing units at an average density of 9.9 per square mile (3.8/km^{2}). The racial makeup of the township was 98.83% White, 0.32% Native American, 0.11% Asian, and 0.74% from two or more races. Hispanic or Latino of any race were 0.21% of the population.

There were 386 households, out of which 28.5% had children under the age of 18 living with them, 59.1% were married couples living together, 7.8% had a female householder with no husband present, and 28.2% were non-families. 24.6% of all households were made up of individuals, and 13.0% had someone living alone who was 65 years of age or older. The average household size was 2.40 and the average family size was 2.82.

In the township the population was spread out, with 23.2% under the age of 18, 6.4% from 18 to 24, 23.2% from 25 to 44, 26.4% from 45 to 64, and 20.7% who were 65 years of age or older. The median age was 42 years. For every 100 females, there were 99.6 males. For every 100 females age 18 and over, there were 103.1 males.

The median income for a household in the township was $30,188, and the median income for a family was $34,167. Males had a median income of $29,375 versus $17,500 for females. The per capita income for the township was $15,466. About 12.8% of families and 14.1% of the population were below the poverty line, including 22.9% of those under age 18 and 5.8% of those age 65 or over.
