= Millersburg, Michigan =

- Village
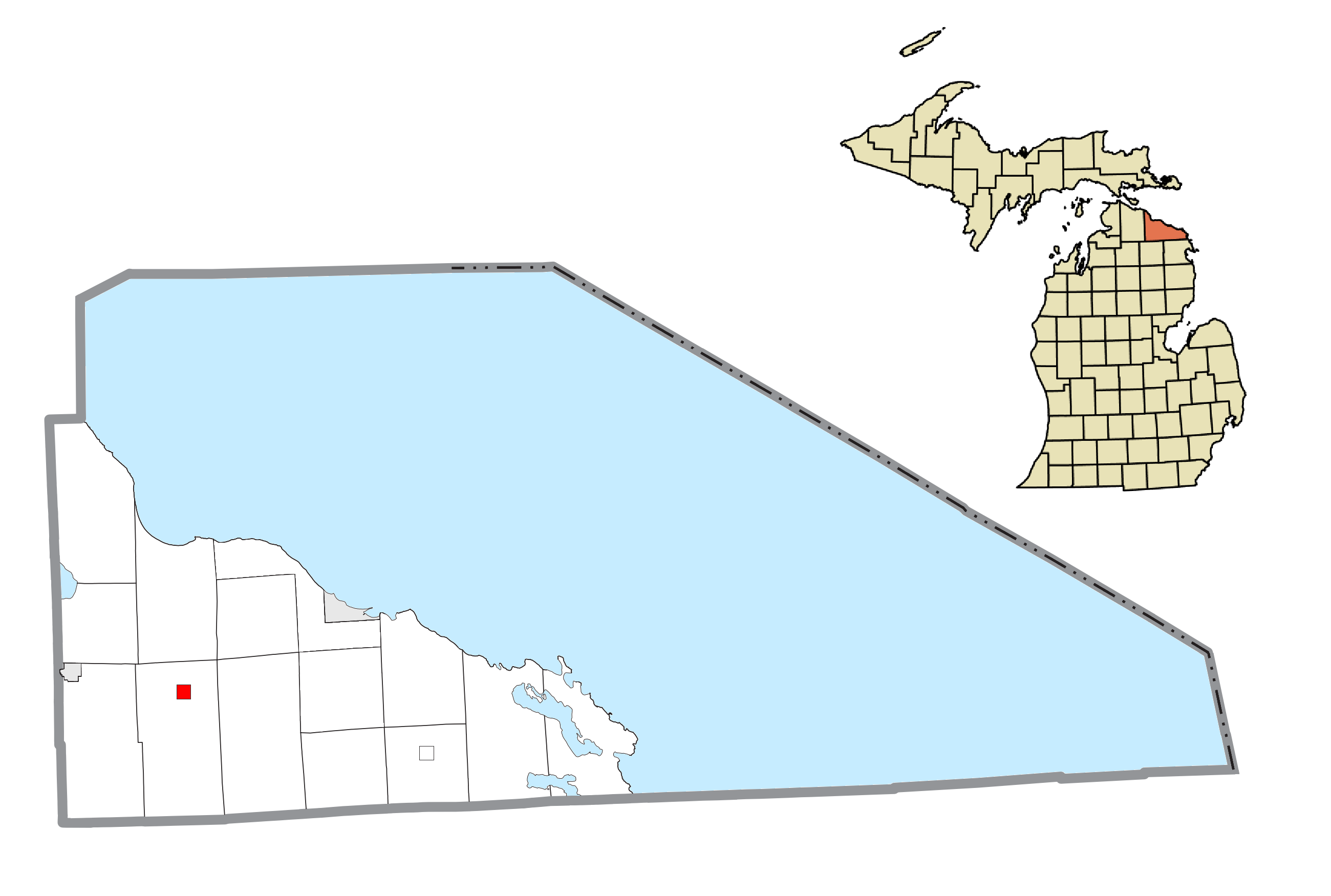
- Location within Presque Isle County

- Location within the state of Michigan
- Coordinates: 45°20′09″N 84°03′38″W
- Country: United States
- State: Michigan
- County: Presque Isle
- Township: Case

Area
  - Total: 0.99 sq mi (2.57 km^{2})
  - Land: 0.99 sq mi (2.56 km^{2})
  - Water: 0 sq mi (0.00 km^{2})
- Elevation: 797 ft (243 m)

Population (2020)
  - Total: 169
  - Density: 170.7/sq mi (65.89/km^{2})
- Time zone: UTC-5 (Eastern (EST))
  - Summer (DST): UTC-4 (EDT)
- ZIP code(s): 49759
- Area code: 989
- FIPS code: 26-54120
- GNIS feature ID: 0632405

Millersburg is a village in Presque Isle County of the U.S. state of Michigan. The population was 169 at the 2020 census. The village is within Case Township.

== Geography ==
According to the United States Census Bureau, the village has a total area of 0.99 square miles (2.56 km^{2}), all land.

== Demographics ==
Historical population
Census	Pop.	Note	%±
1910	519		—
1920	243		−53.2%
1930	297		22.2%
1940	306		3.0%
1950	281		−8.2%
1960	280		−0.4%
1970	200		−28.6%
1980	231		15.5%
1990	250		8.2%
2000	263		5.2%
2010	206		−21.7%
2020	169		−18.0%
U.S. Decennial Census

=== 2010 census ===
As of the census of 2010, there were 206 people, 86 households, and 54 families living in the village. The population density was 208.1 inhabitants per square mile (80.3/km^{2}). There were 114 housing units at an average density of 115.2 per square mile (44.5/km^{2}). The racial makeup of the village was 97.1% White, 1.0% Native American, and 1.9% from two or more races. Hispanic or Latino of any race were 2.4% of the population.

There were 86 households, of which 30.2% had children under the age of 18 living with them, 47.7% were married couples living together, 10.5% had a female householder with no husband present, 4.7% had a male householder with no wife present, and 37.2% were non-families. 34.9% of all households were made up of individuals, and 22.1% had someone living alone who was 65 years of age or older. The average household size was 2.40 and the average family size was 3.06.

The median age in the village was 38.2 years. 28.6% of residents were under the age of 18; 6.5% were between the ages of 18 and 24; 26.2% were from 25 to 44; 20.9% were from 45 to 64; and 18% were 65 years of age or older. The gender makeup of the village was 47.6% male and 52.4% female.

=== 2000 census ===
As of the census of 2000, there were 263 people, 94 households, and 72 families living in the village. The population density was 257.1 inhabitants per square mile (99.3/km^{2}). There were 113 housing units at an average density of 110.5 per square mile (42.7/km^{2}). The racial makeup of the village was 98.86% White, and 1.14% from two or more races. Hispanic or Latino of any race were 0.38% of the population.

There were 94 households, out of which 35.1% had children under the age of 18 living with them, 60.6% were married couples living together, 11.7% had a female householder with no husband present, and 23.4% were non-families. 21.3% of all households were made up of individuals, and 11.7% had someone living alone who was 65 years of age or older. The average household size was 2.72 and the average family size was 3.17.

In the village, the population was spread out, with 30.8% under the age of 18, 4.9% from 18 to 24, 25.5% from 25 to 44, 20.2% from 45 to 64, and 18.6% who were 65 years of age or older. The median age was 36 years. For every 100 females, there were 94.8 males. For every 100 females age 18 and over, there were 95.7 males.

The median income for a household in the village was $24,063, and the median income for a family was $30,417. Males had a median income of $26,875 versus $14,375 for females. The per capita income for the village was $11,890. About 18.1% of families and 19.8% of the population were below the poverty line, including 28.0% of those under the age of eighteen and 7.9% of those 65 or over.

== Climate ==
This climatic region is typified by large seasonal temperature differences, with warm to hot (and often humid) summers and cold (sometimes severely cold) winters. According to the Köppen Climate Classification system, Millersburg has a humid continental climate, abbreviated "Dfb" on climate maps.

== Sites of interest ==
- Buck Falls Ranch and Bar
