= Michigan's 105th House of Representatives district =

American legislative district

Michigan's 105th State House of Representatives district
Representative
Ken Borton; R–Gaylord
- Demographics: 92% White; 0.5% Black; 2.5% Hispanic; 0.4% Asian; 0.3% Native American; 0.2% Other; 4.1% Multiracial
- Population (2024): 90,588

Michigan's 105th House of Representatives district (also referred to as Michigan's 105th House district) is a legislative district within the Michigan House of Representatives located in parts of Antrim, Kalkaska, and Oscoda counties, as well as all of Crawford, Missaukee, Otsego, and Roscommon counties. The district was created in 1965, when the Michigan House of Representatives district naming scheme changed from a county-based system to a numerical one.

== List of representatives ==
Representative	Party	Dates	Residence	Notes
Joseph P. Swallow	Republican	1965–1972	Alpena	
George Prescott	Republican	1973–1978	Tawas City	
Thomas Alley	Democratic	1979–1992	West Branch	
Allen L. Lowe	Republican	1993–1998	Grayling	
Kenneth L. Bradstreet	Republican	1999–2004	Gaylord	
Kevin Elsenheimer	Republican	2005–2010	Bellaire	Lived in Kewadin from around 2007 to 2008.
Greg MacMaster	Republican	2011–2014	Kewadin	
Triston Cole	Republican	2015–2020	Mancelona	
Ken Borton	Republican	2021–Present	Gaylord	

== Recent elections ==
=== 2020s ===
2026 Michigan House of Representatives election
Party	Candidate	Votes	%
Republican	Ken Borton (incumbent)	30,628	66.05
Democratic	Rachel Longendyke Teeter	14,970	32.28
Libertarian	Frank Tillman	773	1.67
Total votes		46,371	100
Republican hold			

2024 Michigan House of Representatives election
Party	Candidate	Votes	%
Republican	Ken Borton	40,043	71.7
Democratic	James Wojey	15,780	28.3
Total votes		55,823	100
Republican hold			

2022 Michigan House of Representatives election
Party	Candidate	Votes	%
Republican	Ken Borton	30,495	69.4
Democratic	Adam Wojdan	13,438	30.6
Total votes		43,933	100
Republican hold			

2020 Michigan House of Representatives election
Party	Candidate	Votes	%
Republican	Ken Borton	37,172	65.7
Democratic	Jonathan Burke	19,423	34.3
Total votes		56,595	100
Republican hold			

2018 Michigan House of Representatives election
Party	Candidate	Votes	%
Republican	Triston Cole	29,112	64.5
Democratic	Melissa Fruge	15,999	35.5
Total votes		45,111	100
Republican hold			

2016 Michigan House of Representatives election
Party	Candidate	Votes	%
Republican	Triston Cole	33,509	70.1
Democratic	Wyatt Knight	14,322	29.9
Total votes		47,831	100
Republican hold			

2014 Michigan House of Representatives election
Party	Candidate	Votes	%
Republican	Triston Cole	21,221	62.9
Democratic	Jay Calo	12,544	37.2
Total votes		33,765	100
Republican hold			

2012 Michigan House of Representatives election
Party	Candidate	Votes	%
Republican	Greg MacMaster	30,725	66.7
Democratic	William Wieske	15,312	33.3
Total votes		46,037	100
Republican hold			

2010 Michigan House of Representatives election
Party	Candidate	Votes	%
Republican	Greg MacMaster	25,907	70.8
Democratic	Greg Dean	10,702	29.2
Total votes		36,609	100
Republican hold			

2008 Michigan House of Representatives election
Party	Candidate	Votes	%
Republican	Kevin Elsenheimer	30,568	60.7
Democratic	Connie Saltonstall	18,455	36.6
Libertarian	Greg Dean	1,354	2.7
Total votes		50,377	100
Republican hold			

== Historical district boundaries ==
Map	Description	Apportionment Plan	Notes
	Alcona County; Alpena County; Cheboygan County; Montmorency County; Oscoda County; Presque Isle County	1964 Apportionment Plan	
	Alcona County; Arenac County; Bay County (part); Gibson Township; Mount Forest Township; Pinconning Township; Gladwin County; Iosco County; Midland County (part); Hope Township; Montmorency County (part); Albert Township; Loud Township (part); Ogemaw County; Oscoda County; Roscommon County (part); Au Sable Township; Backus Township; Nester Township	1972 Apportionment Plan	
	Arenac County; Gladwin County; Iosco County; Ogemaw County	1982 Apportionment Plan	
	Alcona County; Antrim County; Crawford County; Kalkaska County; Montmorency County; Oscoda County; Otsego County	1992 Apportionment Plan	
	Antrim County; Charlevoix County; Cheboygan County (part); Aloha Township; Beaugrand Township; Benton Township; Burt Township; Cheboygan; Ellis Township; Forest Township; Grant Township; Hebron Township; Inverness Township; Mackinaw Township; Mentor Township; Mullett Township; Munro Township; Nunda Township; Walker Township; Waverly Township; Wilmot Township; Otsego County	2001 Apportionment Plan	
	Antrim County; Charlevoix County; Montmorency County; Oscoda County; Otsego County	2011 Apportionment Plan	
