= Duncan Township, Cheboygan County, Michigan =

Duncan Township, Michigan
- Former civil township
- Location in the state of Michigan Location within the United States
- Coordinates: 45°37′12″N 84°20′50″W
- Country: United States
- State: Michigan
- County: Cheboygan
- Created: 1853
- Established: 1854
- Disestablished: 1887
- Time zone: UTC-5 (Eastern (EST))
  - Summer (DST): UTC-4 (EDT)

Duncan Township was a civil township in Cheboygan County in the U.S. state of Michigan. It was created on January 29, 1853, and organized on August 23, 1854. As the second township in the county, it consisted of all parts east of the Cheboygan River. Portions of this township were later incorporated into Benton Township in 1871, and Grant Township in 1879. The remnants of Duncan Township were combined with and incorporated into Benton Township on March 7, 1887.

Historical population
Year	Pop.	±%
1860	134	—
1870	831	+520.1%
1880	270	−67.5%
