= Waverly Township, Michigan =

Waverly Township is the name of some places in the U.S. state of Michigan:

- Waverly Township, Cheboygan County, Michigan
- Waverly Township, Van Buren County, Michigan

== See also ==
- Waverly Township (disambiguation)
