= Munro Township, Michigan =

- Civil township
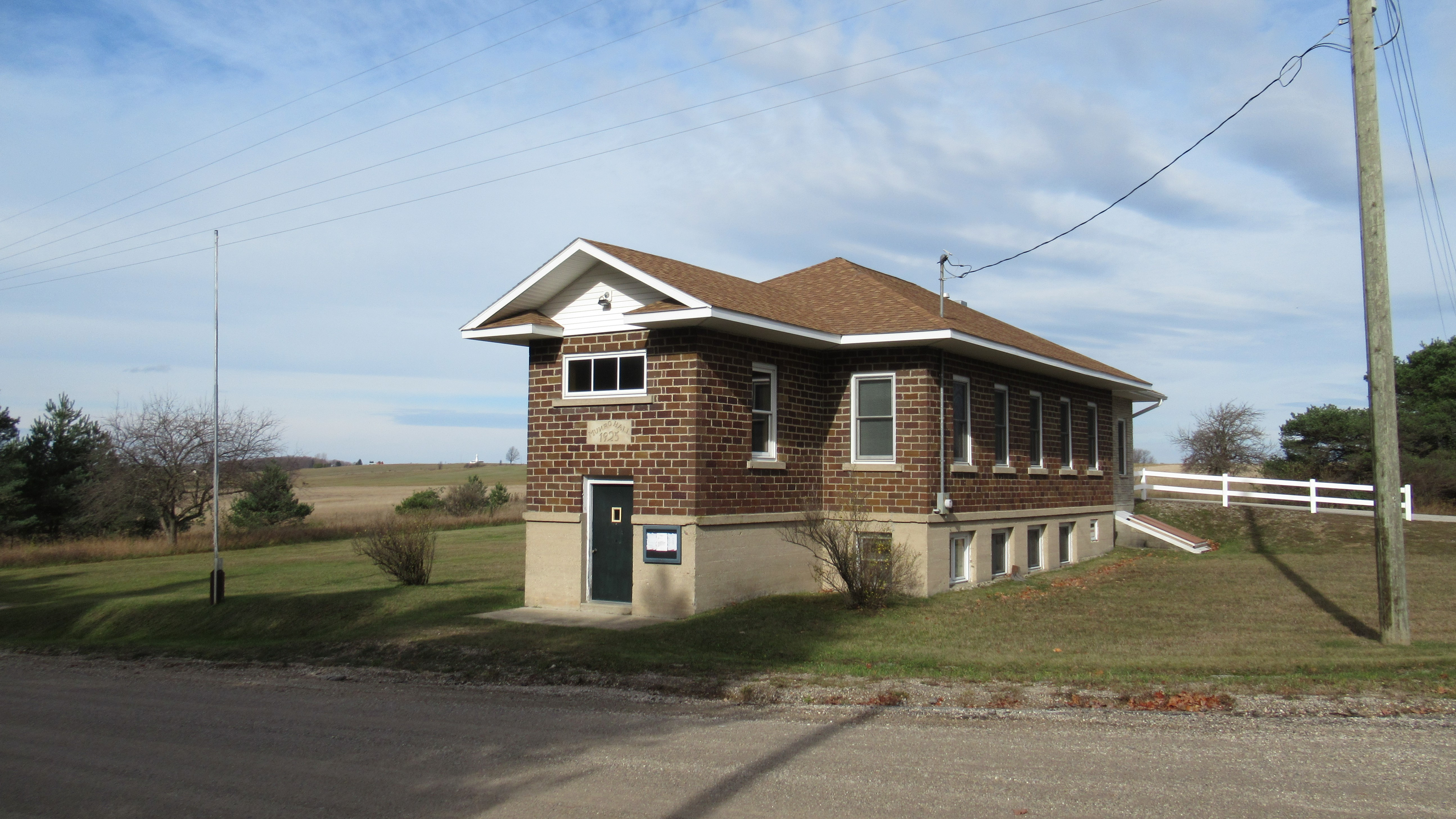
- Munro Township Hall

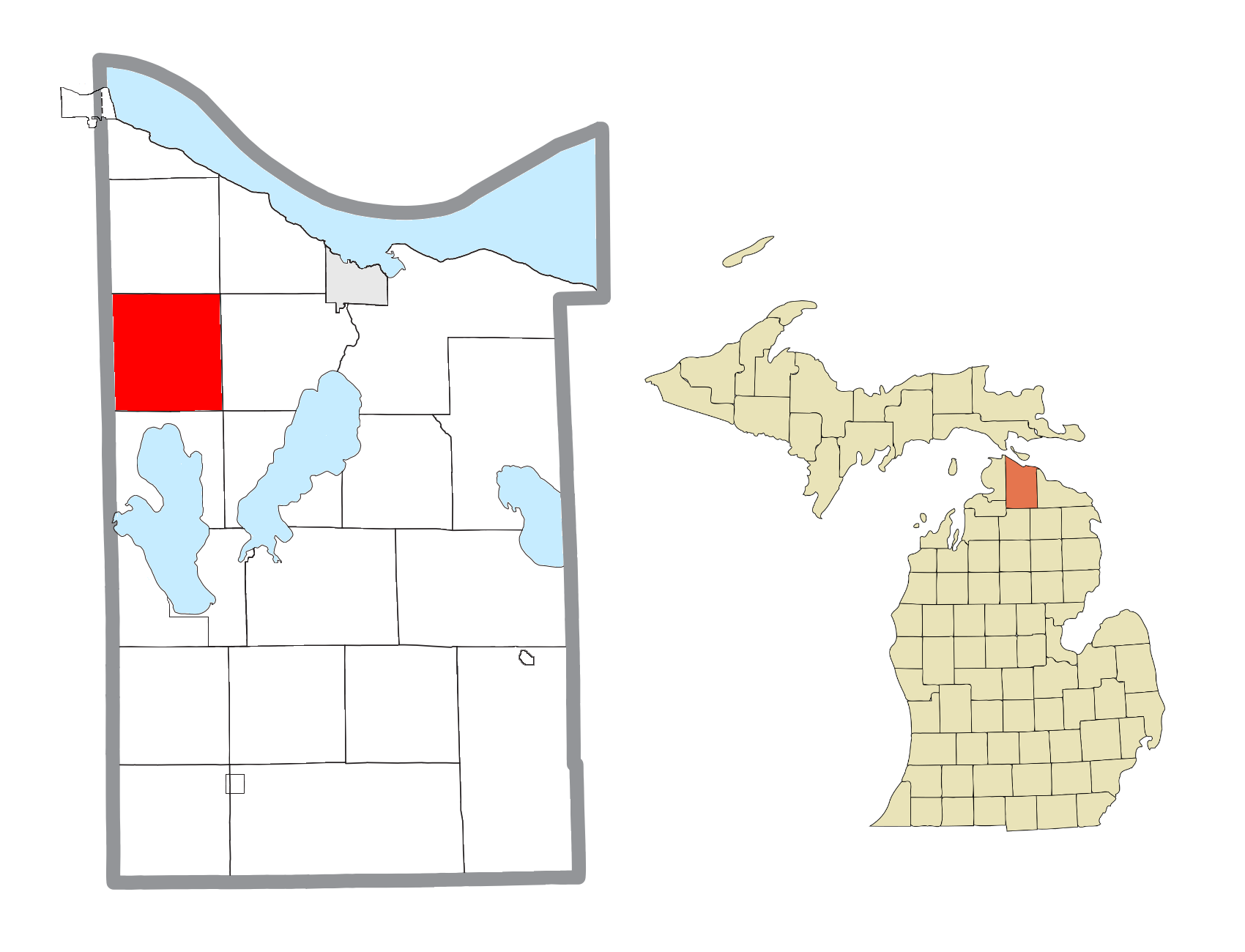
- Location within Cheboygan County

- Location within the state of Michigan Location within the United States
- Coordinates: 45°35′30″N 84°41′15″W
- Country: United States
- State: Michigan
- County: Cheboygan
- Established: 1878

Government
  - Supervisor: Keith Ginop
  - Clerk: Mary Bur

Area
  - Total: 35.17 sq mi (91.09 km^{2})
  - Land: 28.40 sq mi (73.56 km^{2})
  - Water: 6.77 sq mi (17.53 km^{2})
- Elevation: 748 ft (228 m)

Population (2020)
  - Total: 592
  - Density: 20.8/sq mi (8.0/km^{2})
- Time zone: UTC-5 (Eastern (EST))
  - Summer (DST): UTC-4 (EDT)
- ZIP code(s): 49721 (Cheboygan); 49755 (Levering); 49769 (Pellston)
- Area code: 231
- FIPS code: 26-56280
- GNIS feature ID: 1626782
- Website: Official website

Munro Township is a civil township of Cheboygan County in the U.S. state of Michigan. The population was 592 as of the 2020 census.

== Geography ==
Munro Township is located in western Cheboygan County and is bordered by Emmet County to the west. Interstate 75 passes through the eastern part of the township, with two exits providing access. The unincorporated community of Riggsville is located along the eastern border of the township.

According to the United States Census Bureau, the township has a total area of 35.2 square miles (91.1 km^{2}), of which 28.4 square miles (73.6 km^{2}) is land and 6.4 square miles (16.5 km^{2}), or 19.25%, is water. Douglas Lake is a large lake in the center and western parts of the township. Munro Lake, Vincent Lake, and Lancaster Lake are smaller water bodies to the north.

== Demographics ==
As of the census of 2000, there were 679 people, 270 households, and 206 families residing in the township. The population density was 23.8 per square mile (9.2/km^{2}). There were 650 housing units at an average density of 22.8 per square mile (8.8/km^{2}). The racial makeup of the township was 97.20% White, 0.74% Native American, 0.88% Asian, and 1.18% from two or more races. Hispanic or Latino of any race were 0.15% of the population.

There were 270 households, out of which 27.8% had children under the age of 18 living with them, 66.7% were married couples living together, 7.4% had a female householder with no husband present, and 23.7% were non-families. 19.6% of all households were made up of individuals, and 9.3% had someone living alone who was 65 years of age or older. The average household size was 2.47 and the average family size was 2.83.

In the township the population was spread out, with 23.1% under the age of 18, 4.0% from 18 to 24, 25.3% from 25 to 44, 31.8% from 45 to 64, and 15.8% who were 65 years of age or older. The median age was 43 years. For every 100 females, there were 100.9 males. For every 100 females age 18 and over, there were 97.0 males.

The median income for a household in the township was $37,500, and the median income for a family was $44,000. Males had a median income of $33,281 versus $20,000 for females. The per capita income for the township was $22,658. About 7.9% of families and 8.7% of the population were below the poverty line, including 16.3% of those under age 18 and 7.0% of those age 65 or over.

Historical population
Census	Pop.	Note	%±
2000	679		—
2010	571		−15.9%
2020	592		3.7%
U.S. Decennial Census
