= Mentor Township, Michigan =

Mentor Township is the name of some places in the U.S. state of Michigan:

- Mentor Township, Cheboygan County, Michigan
- Mentor Township, Oscoda County, Michigan
