= Maple Grove Township, Michigan =

Maple Grove Township is the name of some places in the U.S. state of Michigan:

- Maple Grove Township, Barry County, Michigan
- Maple Grove Township, Cheboygan County, Michigan (defunct township)
- Maple Grove Township, Manistee County, Michigan
- Maple Grove Township, Saginaw County, Michigan

== See also ==
- Maple Grove, Benzie County, Michigan, a census-designated place in Benzie County
