= Kewadin, Michigan =

Unincorporated community in Antrim County, Michigan

- Unincorporated community
- Etymology: giiwedin (Ojibwe)
- Location within Michigan Location within the United States
- Coordinates: 44°55′03″N 85°22′23″W
- Country: United States
- State: Michigan
- County: Antrim
- Township: Milton
- Settled: 1856
- Elevation: 600 ft (183 m)
- Time zone: UTC-5 (Eastern (EST))
  - Summer (DST): UTC-4 (EDT)
- ZIP code(s): 49648; 49629 (Elk Rapids)
- Area code: 231
- GNIS feature ID: 629640

Kewadin (/kəˈweɪˈdən/ kə-WAY-dən) is an unincorporated community in the U.S. state of Michigan. The community is located in Milton Township, Antrim County, and is located on the northern shore of Elk Lake, roughly 2 miles (3.2 km) northeast of the village of Elk Rapids. As an unincorporated community, Kewadin has no legally defined boundaries or population statistics of its own. However, a post office operates out of the community, with the ZIP Code 49648.

== History ==
The Kewadin area was occupied by indigenous peoples until 1876, when a European settlement was established, known as Indian Town. On June 4, 1883, a post office opened in the community, and it was renamed to Kewadin, after the Ojibwe word giiwedin, meaning 'north'.
