= Maple Grove Township, Cheboygan County, Michigan =

Maple Grove Township, Michigan
- Former civil township
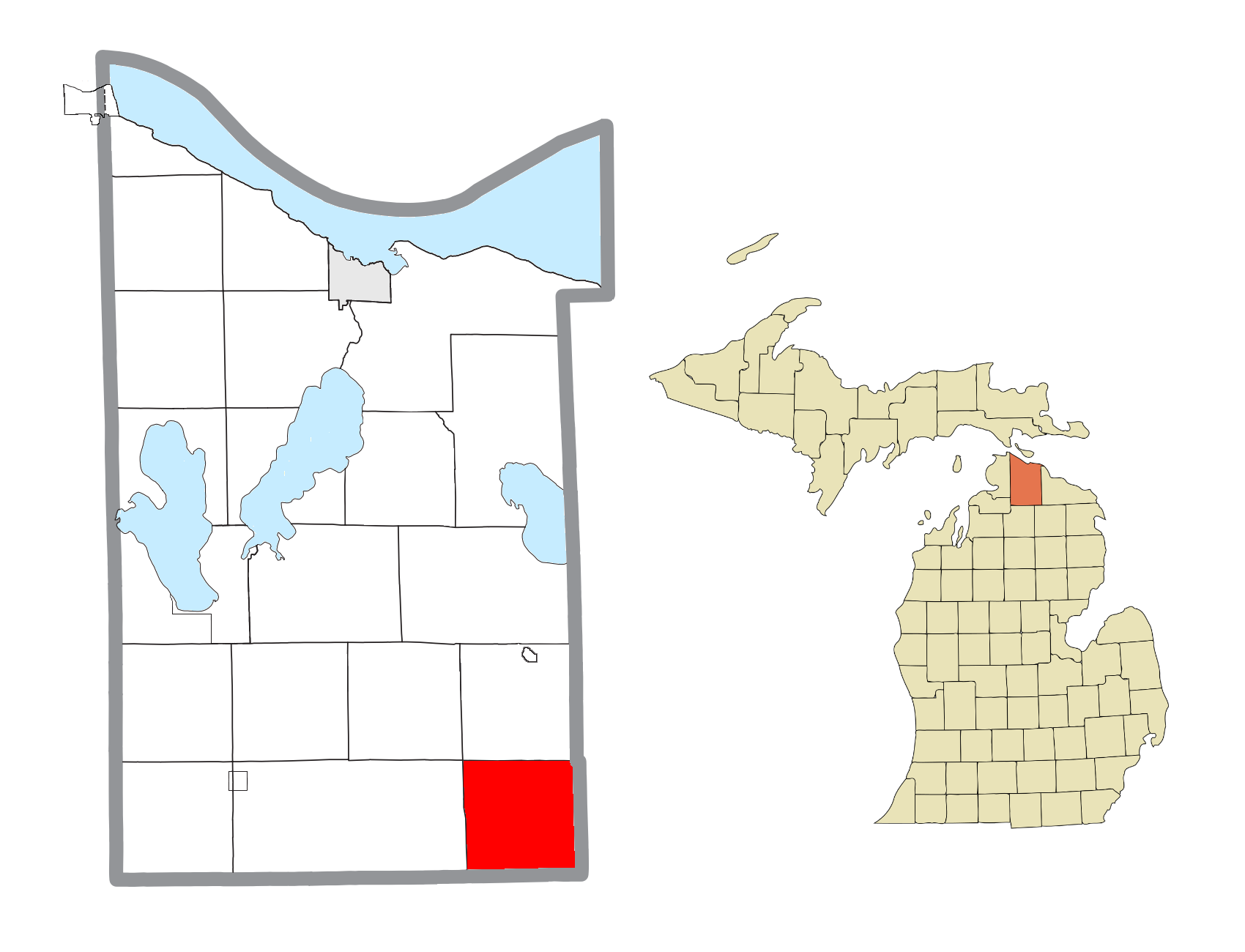
- Former location within Cheboygan County

- Location within the state of Michigan Location within the United States
- Coordinates: 45°14′54″N 84°18′15″W
- Country: United States
- State: Michigan
- County: Cheboygan
- Established: 1909
- Disestablished: 1942

Population (1940)
  - Total: 10
- Time zone: UTC-5 (Eastern (EST))
  - Summer (DST): UTC-4 (EDT)

Maple Grove Township was a civil township in Cheboygan County in the U.S. state of Michigan.

The township was created from the southern half of Forest Township in 1909. Maple Grove Township last reported a population of 10 at the 1940 census. In 1942, it merged back into Forest Township due to a low population.

== History ==
Historical population
Year	Pop.	±%
1910	—	—
1920	63	—
1930	33	−47.6%
1940	10	−69.7%

Maple Grove Township was first established on October 28, 1909. It was set aside from the southern 36-square-mile (93 km^{2}) survey township area of Forest Township in the southeastern corner of Cheboygan County.

Although the township was created prior to the 1910 census, the new township went unreported in that decennial census. In the 1920 census, the population was recorded at 63. The township recorded a population of 33 in the 1930 census. In the 1940 census, the township recorded only 10 residents. Because of its very low population, the township returned back to Forest Township in 1942, at which time Maple Grove Township ceased to exist.

== Geography ==
Although the township never had any precise area measurements, it occupied the southern 36 sections of Forest Township, which is a survey township area approximately equal to 36 square miles (93 km^{2}) total.

The township contained Dorsy Lake (or Duby Lake) and Silver Lake. The Black River also flowed through the township. The rural township had no major roadways, although M-33 was created in 1919 and ran near the eastern edge of the township.
