= Munro Lake =

Lake in the state of Michigan, United States

- Location within Michigan Location within the United States
- Location: Cheboygan County, Michigan
- Coordinates: 45.6155911°N 84.6827962°W
- Type: Lake
- Basin countries: United States
- Surface area: 515 acres (208 ha)
- Max. depth: 15 feet (4.6 m)
- Shore length^{1}: 5.4 miles (8.7 km)
- ^{1} Shore length is not a well-defined measure.

Munro Lake is an inland lake located in Cheboygan County on the northern tip of Michigan's lower peninsula. The lake discharges into Douglas Lake and, ultimately, into the East Branch Maple River. Much of the lakeshore is publicly owned, being part of the Mackinaw State Forest.

The Tip of the Mitt Watershed Council characterizes Munro Lake as a groundwater-fed, relatively shallow lake. Carved by glaciers, it now provides a home for northern pike, bass, and panfish. It has a surface area of 515 acres (208 ha), a shoreline of 5.4 miles (8.7 km), and a maximum depth of 15 feet (4.6 m).

== See also ==
- List of lakes in Michigan
