= Greg MacMaster =

American politician

Member of the Michigan House of Representatives from the 105th district
- In office January 1, 2011 – December 31, 2014
- Preceded by: Kevin Elsenheimer
- Succeeded by: Triston Cole

Personal details
- Born: March 1962 (age 64) Inglewood, California
- Party: Republican
- Spouse: Kim

Greg MacMaster (born March, 1962) is an American politician from Michigan. A Republican, MacMaster is a former member of the Michigan House of Representatives, representing the 105th district from 2011 until 2014.

MacMaster was born in Inglewood, California. He served in the United States Air Force for 10 years. He also worked as a TV and radio weatherman.

In 2014, MacMaster ran unsuccessfully for the 37th district of the Michigan Senate, losing in the primary to Wayne Schmidt.

== Sources ==
- State House bio of MacMaster
- state senate campaign site
