= Kevin Elsenheimer =

American politician

Minority Leader of the Michigan House of Representatives
- In office January 1, 2009 – December 31, 2010

Member of the Michigan House of Representatives from the 105th district
- In office January 1, 2005 – December 31, 2010
- Preceded by: Ken Bradstreet
- Succeeded by: Greg MacMaster

Personal details
- Born: August 21, 1965 (age 61) Traverse City, Michigan, U.S.
- Party: Republican
- Spouse: Ann Elsenheimer
- Children: Emma, Noah and Jacob
- Education: Northwestern Michigan College, Michigan State University, Wayne State University Law School
- Occupation: 13th Circuit Court Judge
- Profession: Executive Director, MSHDA, Sr. Deputy Director, LARA; Director, Michigan Workers' Compensation Agency; House Minority Leader; County Asst. Prosecutor

Kevin Elsenheimer (born August 21, 1965) is an American judge, lawyer and politician from Republican Party and a former minority leader of the Michigan House of Representatives. He is the former Director of the Michigan Workers' Compensation Agency and deputy director and Senior Deputy Director of Michigan's Department of Licensing and Regulatory Affairs (LARA). He served in the cabinet of Michigan Governor Rick Snyder as executive director of the Michigan State Housing Development Authority (MSHDA). He was appointed 13th Circuit Court Judge by Governor Rick Snyder in January 2017.

== Childhood and family ==
Elsenheimer was born and raised in Traverse City, Michigan. He and his wife live in East Bay Township, outside Traverse City, Michigan. He is the son of former Grand Traverse County Commissioner, the late Arthur C. Elsenheimer.

== Education ==
Elsenheimer graduated from Traverse City Central High School and then attended Northwestern Michigan College, where he received an Associate of Arts degree. He then earned a Bachelor of Arts degree from Michigan State University in 1987 studying psychology, History and Philosophy. Elsenheimer continued his education at Wayne State University Law School where he obtained his J.D. degree.

== Previous offices held ==
Elsenheimer served as assistant prosecuting attorney for Antrim County and as a member of the Bellaire Public Schools Board of Education for a term-and-a-half, from 1998 to 2003. He later stepped down to run for the Michigan Legislature.

== Legal career ==
Antrim County Prosecuting Attorney Charles H. Koop hired Elsenheimer as an assistant prosecutor in 1994. As an assistant prosecuting attorney Elsenheimer handled over 30 jury and non-jury trials. Two years later Elsenheimer formed a law firm with former elected Antrim County Prosecutors James G. Young and Bryan E. Graham. The law firm focuses on representation of municipal entities. At the firm Elsenheimer tried matters in circuit courts throughout Michigan, argued several cases in the Michigan Court of Appeals, and practiced in both the Michigan Supreme Court and US Supreme Court. Elsenheimer lost election to the 86th District Court to Judge Michael Stepka in 2010. On January 18, 2017, he was appointed 13th Circuit Court Judge for Antrim, Grand Traverse and Leelanau counties by Governor Snyder, replacing retired Judge Philip E. Rodgers, Jr..

== Legislative career ==
With the retirement of Rep. Ken Bradstreet due to term limits, Elsenheimer filed to run for Michigan's 105th state house district in 2003. He defeated several opponents in the Republican primary, including John Ramsey, the father of the late JonBenet Ramsey. He was elected to a 2005–06 term in the fall general election defeating Democrat Jim McKimmy 62%-38%, and was re-elected to two additional two-year terms before retiring in 2010 due to term limits.

During the 2005–06 term Elsenheimer was elected by the Republican caucus to serve as Associate Speaker Pro Tem. He served as the Assistant Minority Leader during the 2007–08 term, and as Republican Minority Leader during the 2009–10 term. Elsenheimer left Republicans in majority in the Michigan House following the 2010 elections picking up a net of 21 seats for his party.

While serving in the majority during the 2005–06 term Elsenheimer had 19 bills signed into law. Notably, working with State Senator Jason Allen, he passed Heidi's law, PA 564 of 2006, which allowed use of prior drunk driving convictions in charging decisions regardless of the number of years that passed since the convictions. The law is named in honor of Heidi Steiner who lost her life to a drunk driver in Antrim County.

Elsenheimer also drafted and passed Michigan's Unified Zoning Act, PA 110 of 2006.

== Workers' Compensation Career ==
As Director of the Michigan Workers' Compensation Agency from 2010 to 2015, Elsenheimer oversaw the enactment of sweeping legislative reforms to Michigan's 100-year-old workers compensation statute. The reforms were signed into law by Governor Snyder in 2011. As a result, Michigan has experienced a 39% reduction in pure premium workers compensation insurance costs saving employers an estimated $390 million in premiums since 2011.

== Licensing and Regulatory Affairs (LARA) ==
As Chief Deputy Director and deputy director of Michigan's Department of Licensing and Regulatory Affairs (LARA), Elsenheimer's reports included the Workers' Compensation Agency, the Michigan Liquor Control Commission (MLCC), and the Office of Regulatory Reinvention (ORR), among other administrative entities. During his tenure, the ORR marked the net reduction of over 1500 obsolete, redundant or unenforceable administrative rules.

== Michigan State Housing Development Authority (MSHDA) ==
Elsenheimer was appointed executive director of MSHDA in 2015, and left to take an appointment to the 13th Circuit Court. In 2016 the state housing authority reduced operational expenses by $500,000, lowered personnel costs, coordinated policies which led to a 15% drop in veterans' homelessness in Michigan, and restructured or refinanced almost $780 million in housing debt leading to more than $30 million in gross savings.

== Judicial career ==
Governor Rick Snyder appointed Elsenheimer 13th Circuit Judge for Grand Traverse, Antrim and Leelanau counties in January 2017. He ran unopposed and was elected in 2018 and in 2020. The Michigan Supreme Court named him Chief Judge of the 13th Circuit Court, and the Antrim, Grand Traverse, and Leelanau Probate Courts for a term beginning in 2020.

== Honors and awards ==
In 2024, Judge Elsenheimer was named to the Traverse City Senior High School Hall of Fame. Northwestern Michigan College named Elsenheimer an Outstanding Alumnus in 2017. In 2016 he was named Outstanding Public Official by Habitat for Humanity of Michigan. Elsenheimer is a Rodel Fellow with the Aspen Institute, and a BIILD Fellow with the Council for State Governments. He was named outstanding legislator by the Michigan Association of Planners, the Michigan Manufacturers Association, the Michigan Grape/Wine Institute, and the Michigan Chiefs of Police. In 2009 he was named the most effective Republican legislator in the Michigan House by MIRS.
