= Ken Borton =

American politician

Member of the Michigan House of Representatives from the 105th district
- Incumbent
- Assumed office January 1, 2021
- Preceded by: Triston Cole

Personal details
- Party: Republican
- Education: Liberty University (BA)

Ken Borton is an American politician serving as a member of the Michigan House of Representatives from the 105th district. Elected in November 2020, he assumed office on January 1, 2021.

== Education ==
Borton earned a Bachelor of Arts degree in Bible study and biblical counseling from Liberty University.

== Career ==
Borton has worked as an administrator for the Michigan Association of Counties and the Northern Michigan Counties Association. He was a member of the board of directors of the National Association of Counties from 2018 to 2020. He also served as chair of the Otsego County Board of Commissioners. Borton was elected to the Michigan House of Representatives in November 2020 and assumed office on January 1, 2021.

Borton was reelected in 2022 and in 2024.
