= Triston Cole =

American politician (born 1976)

Majority Leader of the Michigan House of Representatives
- In office January 9, 2019 – January 1, 2021
- Preceded by: Dan Lauwers
- Succeeded by: Ben Frederick

Member of the Michigan House of Representatives from the 105th district
- In office January 1, 2015 – January 1, 2021
- Preceded by: Greg MacMaster
- Succeeded by: Ken Borton

Personal details
- Born: January 4, 1976 (age 50)
- Party: Republican
- Spouse: Stacy
- Education: Northwestern Michigan College; Ferris State University
- Website: Party website

Triston Cole (born January 4, 1976) is an American politician who served as a member of the Michigan House of Representatives from 2015 to 2021.

== Career ==
First elected in November 2014, Cole represented Antrim, Charlevoix, Montmorency, Oscoda, and Otsego counties in the northern part of the Lower Peninsula.

Prior to his election to the House, Cole was a hunting guide for 15 years. He and his wife Stacy also started a farm in Antrim County. Cole is also a former president of the Antrim County Farm Bureau and chairman of the county Republican Party.

== Electoral history ==
=== 2014 ===
2014 General Election: 105th House District
Party	Candidate	Votes	%
Republican	Triston Cole	20,879	62.85
Democratic	Jay Calo	12,339	37.15
Total votes		33,218	100.0
Republican hold			

Michigan House of Representatives
Preceded by Dan Lauwers	Majority Leader of the Michigan House of Representatives; 2019–2021	Succeeded by Ben Frederick
