= Beaugrand Township, Michigan =

- Civil township
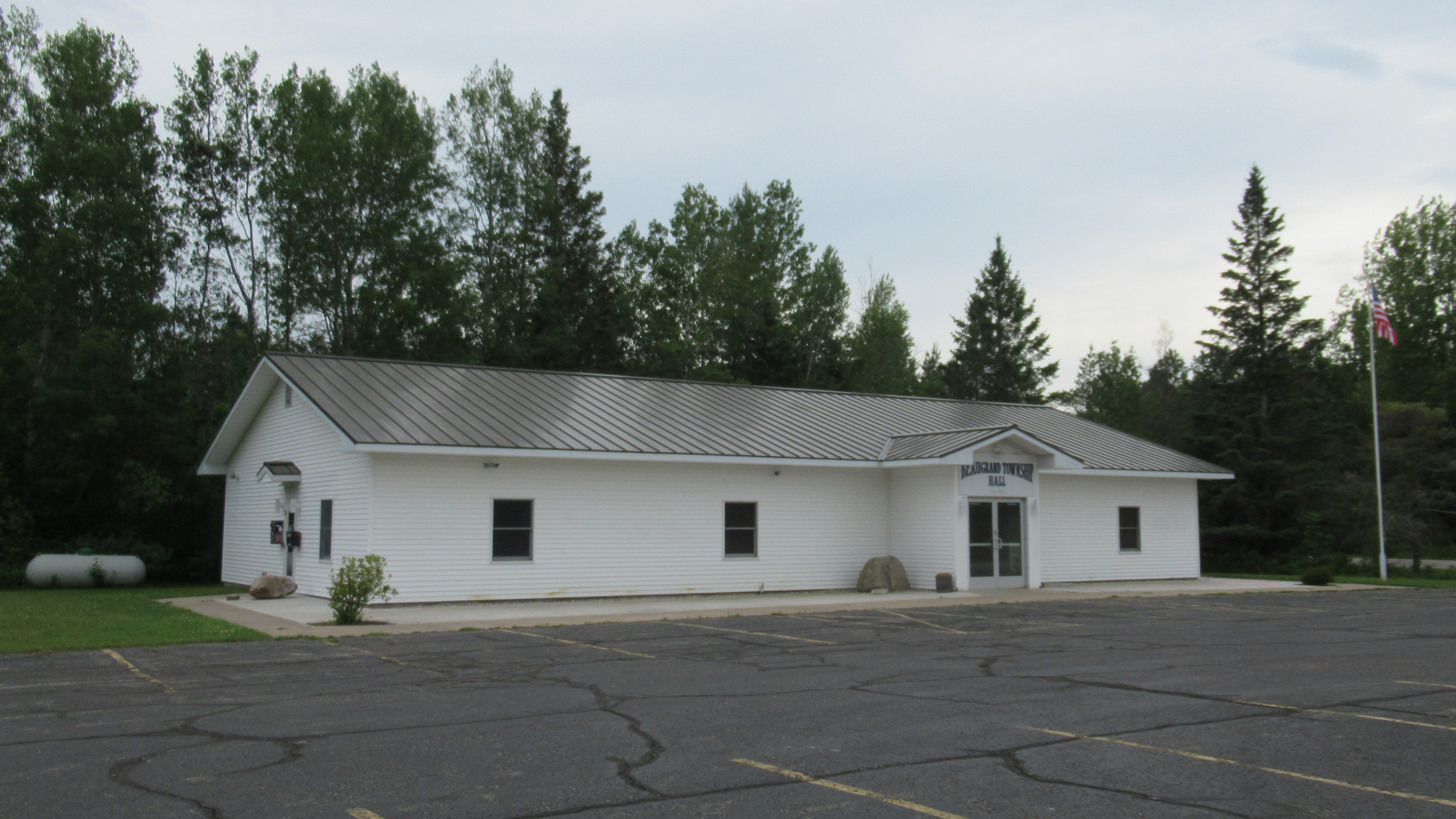
- Beaugrand Township Hall

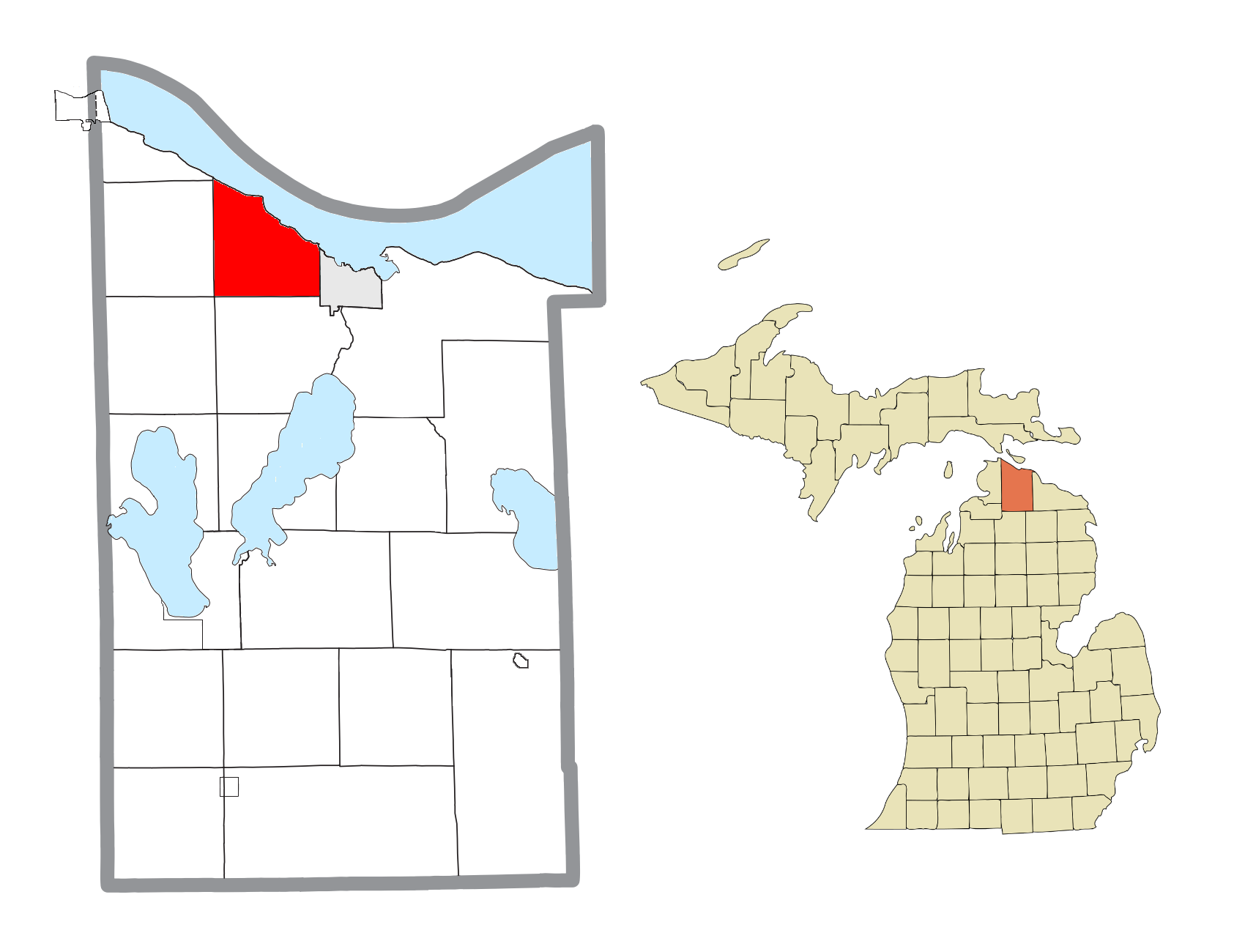
- Location within Cheboygan County

- Location within the state of Michigan Location within the United States
- Coordinates: 45°39′49″N 84°32′25″W
- Country: United States
- State: Michigan
- County: Cheboygan
- Established: 1884

Government
  - Supervisor: Marcia Rocheleau
  - Clerk: Terri Sarrault

Area
  - Total: 23.90 sq mi (61.90 km^{2})
  - Land: 23.83 sq mi (61.72 km^{2})
  - Water: 0.069 sq mi (0.18 km^{2})
- Elevation: 659 ft (201 m)

Population (2020)
  - Total: 1,092
  - Density: 45.8/sq mi (17.7/km^{2})
- Time zone: UTC-5 (Eastern (EST))
  - Summer (DST): UTC-4 (EDT)
- ZIP code(s): 49721 (Cheboygan)
- Area code: 231
- FIPS code: 26-06500
- GNIS feature ID: 1625899
- Website: Official website

Beaugrand Township is a civil township of Cheboygan County in the U.S. state of Michigan. As of the 2020 census, the township population was 1,092.

== Geography ==
The township is located in northwestern Cheboygan County, bordered to the northeast by the South Channel of the Straits of Mackinac and to the southeast by the city of Cheboygan, the county seat. The township includes the unincorporated communities of Pries Landing, Point Nipigon, and Grand View, all along the shore of the South Channel. U.S. Route 23 follows the shoreline, leading southeast into Cheboygan and northwest to Mackinaw City.

According to the United States Census Bureau, the township has a total area of 23.9 square miles (61.9 km^{2}), of which 23.8 square miles (61.7 km^{2}) is land and 0.077 square miles (0.2 km^{2}), or 0.32%, is water.

== Demographics ==
As of the census of 2000, there were 1,157 people, 484 households, and 351 families residing in the township. The population density was 48.5 inhabitants per square mile (18.7/km^{2}). There were 643 housing units at an average density of 27.0 per square mile (10.4/km^{2}). The racial makeup of the township was 93.78% White, 0.17% African American, 2.25% Native American, 0.09% Asian, 0.09% from other races, and 3.63% from two or more races. Hispanic or Latino people of any race were 0.52% of the population.

There were 484 households, out of which 28.9% had children under the age of 18 living with them, 60.7% were married couples living together, 8.3% had a female householder with no husband present, and 27.3% were non-families. 22.9% of all households were made up of individuals, and 11.2% had someone living alone who was 65 years of age or older. The average household size was 2.39 and the average family size was 2.79.

In the township the population was spread out, with 23.1% under the age of 18, 6.0% from 18 to 24, 24.4% from 25 to 44, 29.0% from 45 to 64, and 17.6% who were 65 years of age or older. The median age was 43 years. For every 100 females, there were 93.8 males. For every 100 females age 18 and over, there were 93.5 males.

The median income for a household in the township was $34,792, and the median income for a family was $39,779. Males had a median income of $30,417 versus $20,625 for females. The per capita income for the township was $20,244. About 6.5% of families and 9.5% of the population were below the poverty line, including 13.0% of those under age 18 and 4.3% of those age 65 or over.
