= Waverly Township =

Waverly Township may refer to the following places:

- Waverly Township, Cheboygan County, Michigan
- Waverly Township, Van Buren County, Michigan
- Waverly Township, Martin County, Minnesota
- Waverly Township, Lincoln County, Missouri
- Waverly Township, Pennsylvania
- Waverly Township, Codington County, South Dakota
- Waverly Township, Marshall County, South Dakota

See also

- Waverly (disambiguation)
