= Waverly Township, Cheboygan County, Michigan =

Waverly Township, Michigan
- Civil township
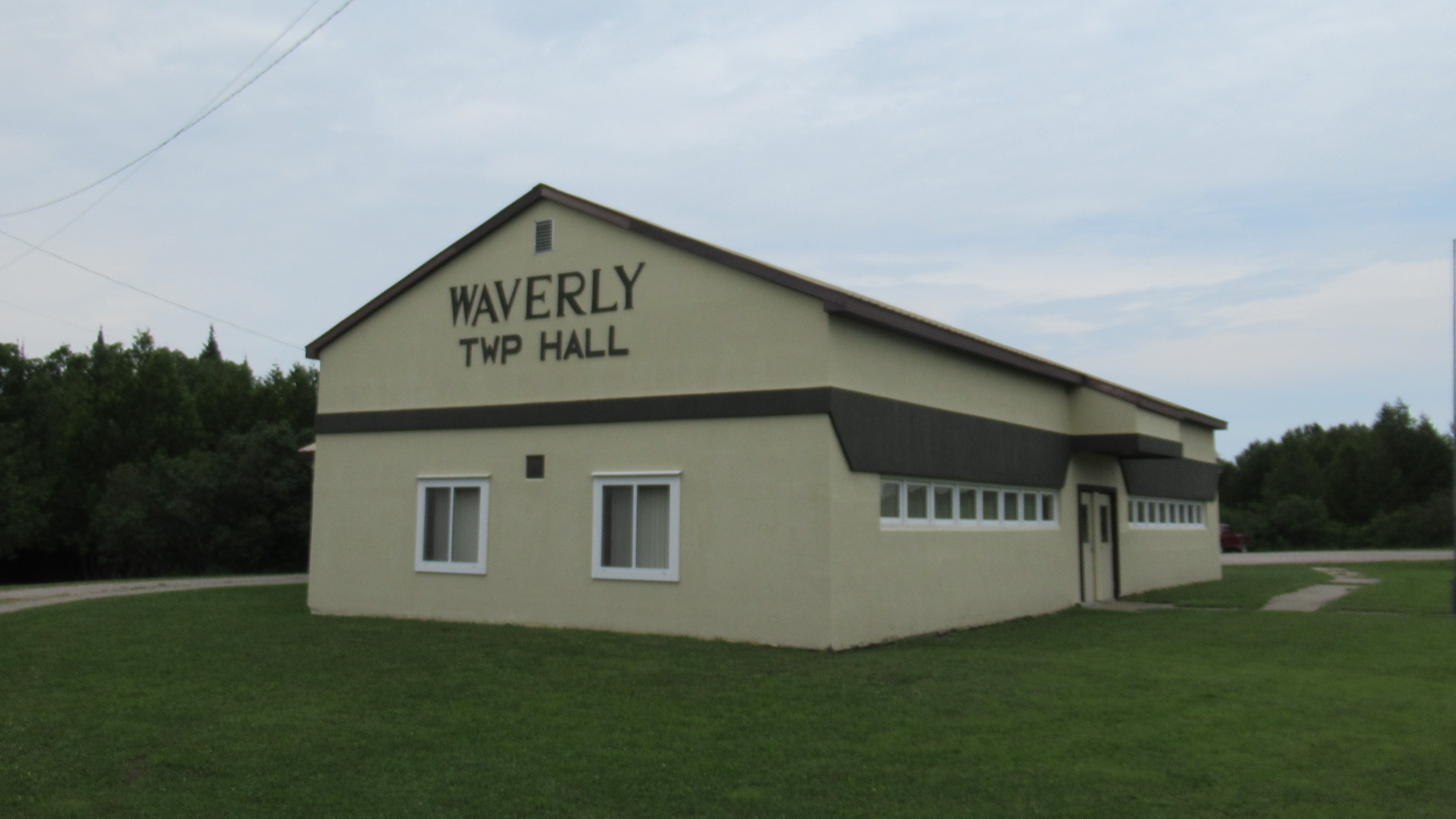
- Waverly Township Hall

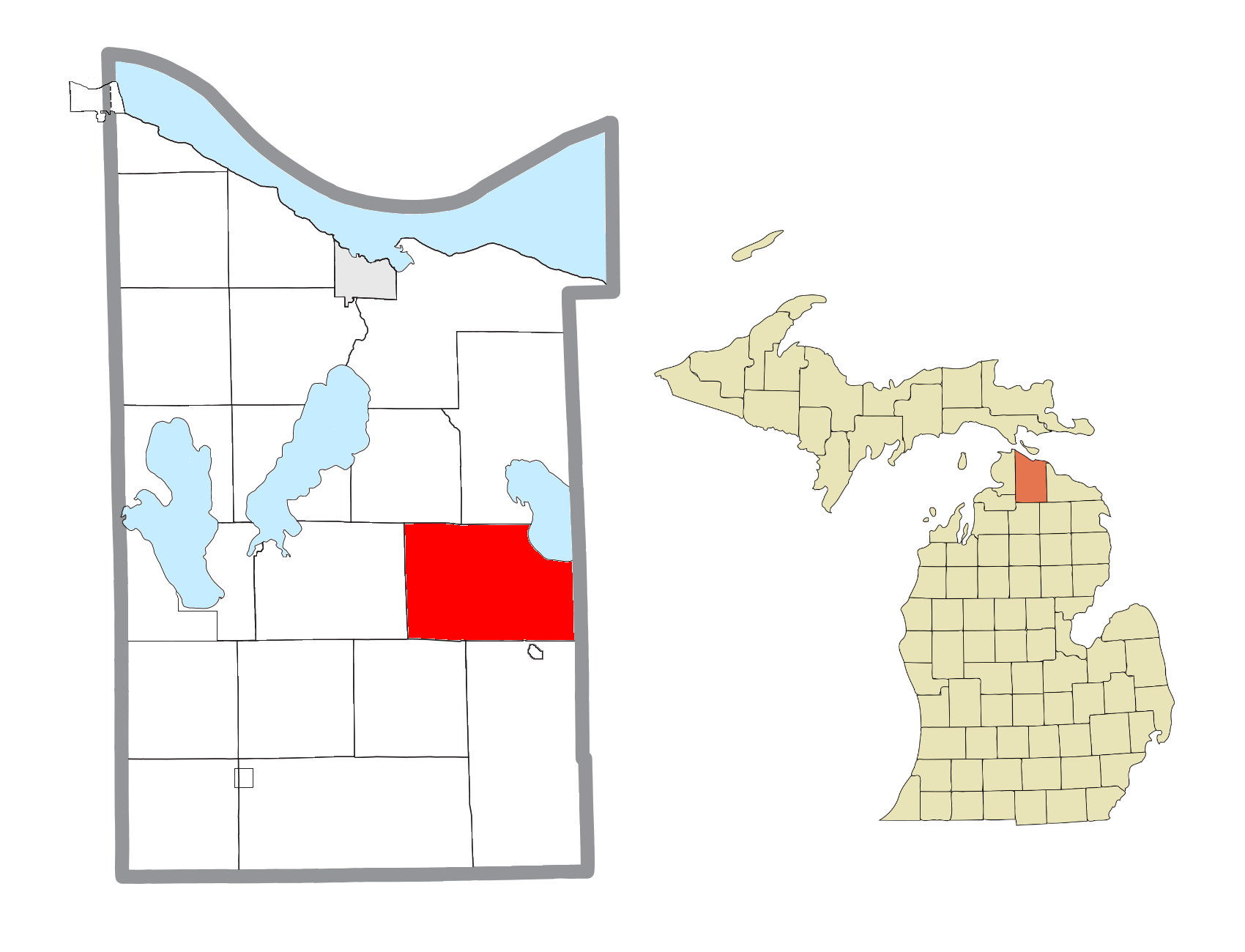
- Location within Cheboygan County

- Location within the state of Michigan Location within the United States
- Coordinates: 45°24′59″N 84°19′25″W
- Country: United States
- State: Michigan
- County: Cheboygan
- Established: 1882

Government
  - Supervisor: Kory Hyde
  - Clerk: Becky Hyde

Area
  - Total: 53.07 sq mi (137.45 km^{2})
  - Land: 48.19 sq mi (124.81 km^{2})
  - Water: 4.88 sq mi (12.64 km^{2})
- Elevation: 676 ft (206 m)

Population (2020)
  - Total: 373
  - Density: 7.74/sq mi (2.99/km^{2})
- Time zone: UTC-5 (Eastern (EST))
  - Summer (DST): UTC-4 (EDT)
- ZIP code(s): 49705 (Afton); 49765 (Onaway)
- Area code: 231
- FIPS code: 26-84760
- GNIS feature ID: 1627228

Waverly Township is a civil township of Cheboygan County in the U.S. state of Michigan. The population was 373 at the 2020 census.

== Geography ==
Waverly Township is located in eastern Cheboygan County and is bordered by Presque Isle County to the east. The northeast corner of the township is in Black Lake. The Upper Black River flows northward through the center of the township, entering Black Lake to the north in Grant Township. According to the United States Census Bureau, Waverly Township has a total area of 53.1 square miles (137.5 km^{2}), of which 48.2 square miles (124.8 km^{2}) is land and 4.9 square miles (12.7 km^{2}), or 9.21%, is water.

== Demographics ==
As of the census of 2000, there were 472 people, 182 households, and 133 families residing in the township. The population density was 9.8 per square mile (3.8/km^{2}). There were 404 housing units at an average density of 8.4 per square mile (3.2/km^{2}). The racial makeup of the township was 97.46% White, 0.85% Native American, 0.21% from other races, and 1.48% from two or more races. Hispanic or Latino of any race were 1.06% of the population.

There were 182 households, out of which 29.1% had children under the age of 18 living with them, 64.3% were married couples living together, 3.8% had a female householder with no husband present, and 26.9% were non-families. 23.6% of all households were made up of individuals, and 13.2% had someone living alone who was 65 years of age or older. The average household size was 2.49 and the average family size was 2.92.

In the township, the population was spread out, with 24.8% under the age of 18, 4.9% from 18 to 24, 23.5% from 25 to 44, 25.6% from 45 to 64, and 21.2% who were 65 years of age or older. The median age was 43 years. For every 100 females, there were 102.6 males. For every 100 females age 18 and over, there were 106.4 males.

The median income for a household in the township was $31,875, and the median income for a family was $37,321. Males had a median income of $28,750 versus $21,250 for females. The per capita income for the township was $17,085. About 7.9% of families and 11.6% of the population were below the poverty line, including 7.8% of those under age 18 and 8.5% of those age 65 or over.
