= Mentor Township, Cheboygan County, Michigan =

Mentor Township, Michigan
- Civil township
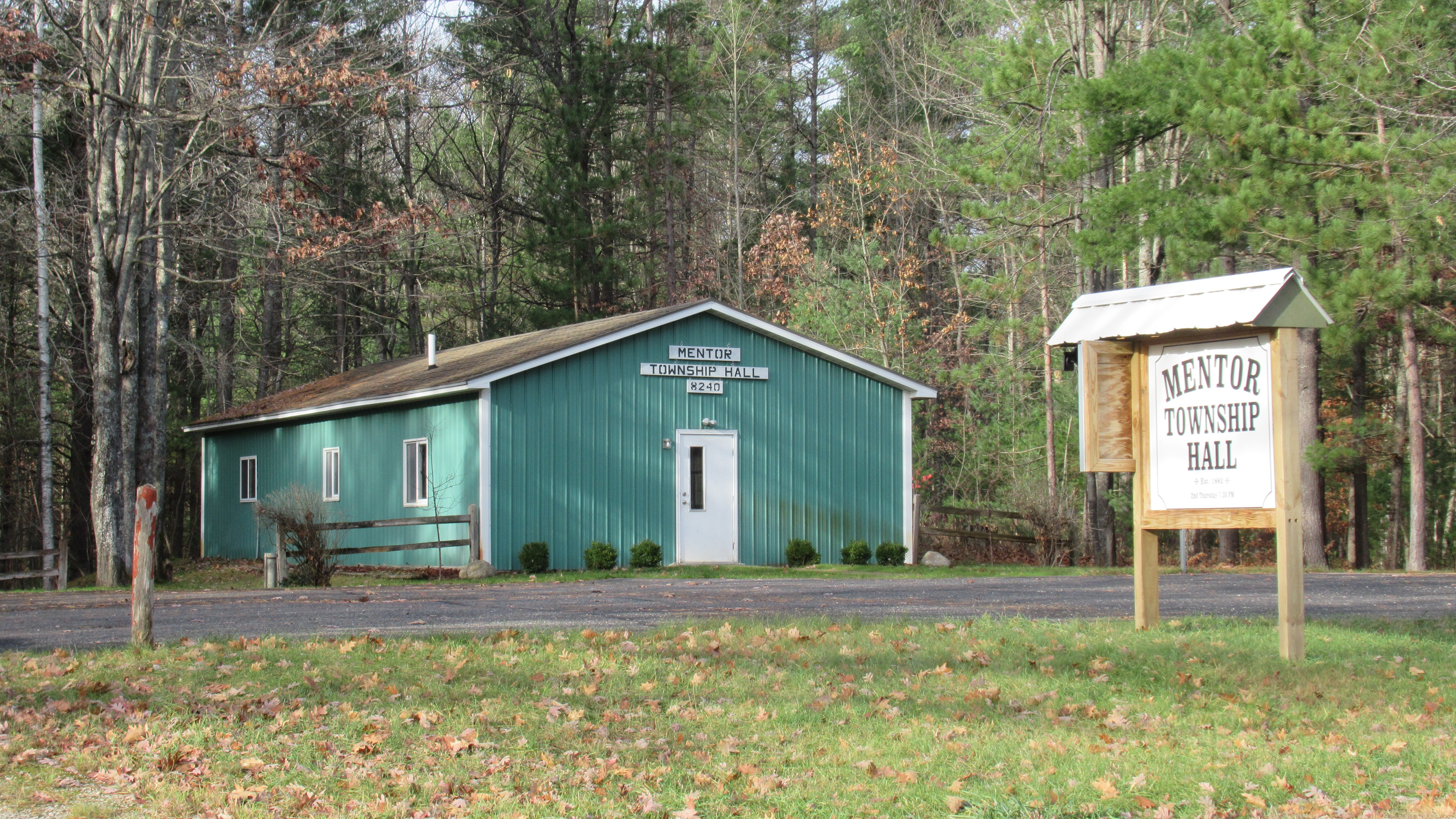
- Mentor Township Hall

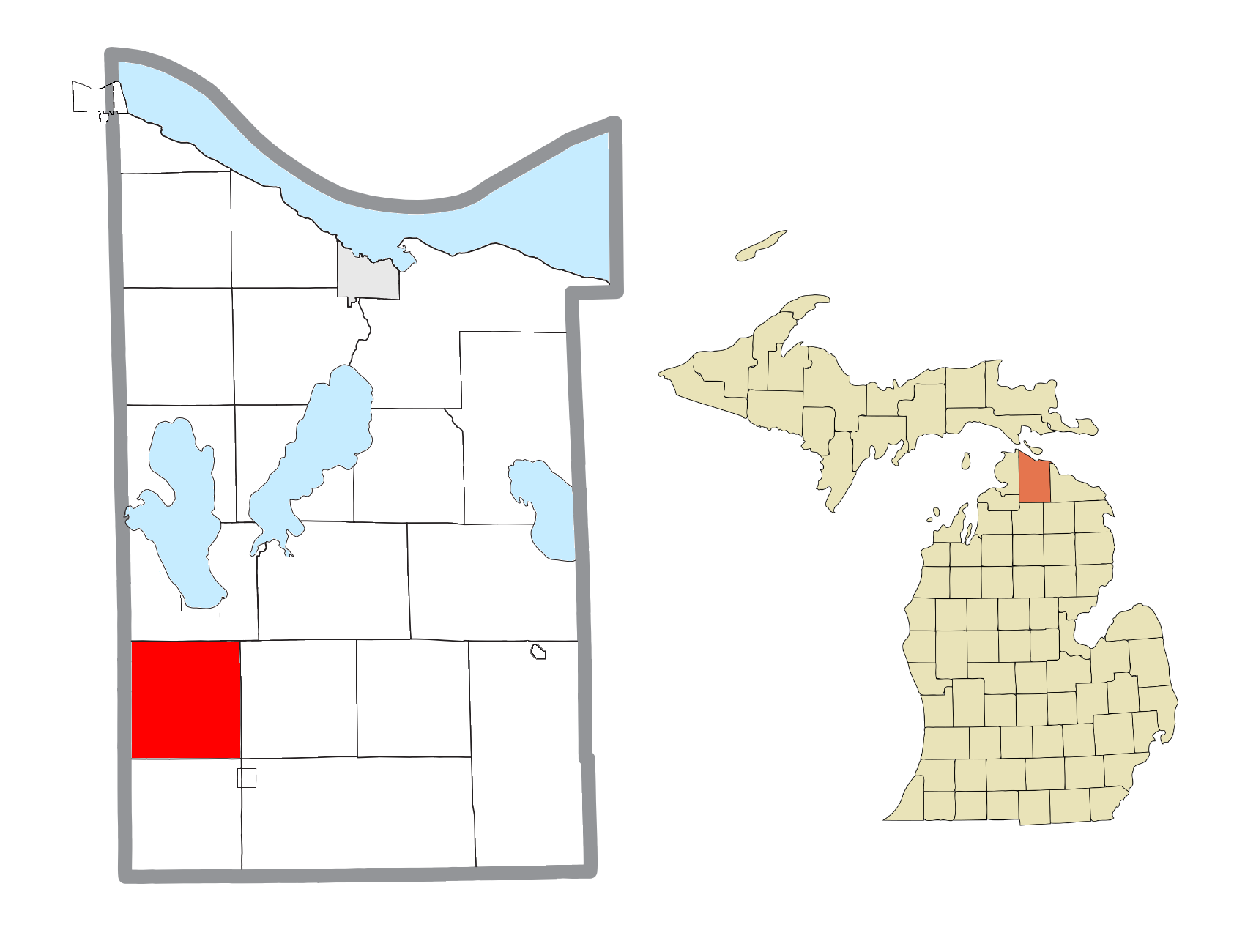
- Location within Cheboygan County

- Location within the state of Michigan Location within the United States
- Coordinates: 45°20′51″N 84°40′00″W
- Country: United States
- State: Michigan
- County: Cheboygan
- Established: 1882

Government
  - Supervisor: Greg Whittaker
  - Clerk: Dee Whittaker

Area
  - Total: 35.86 sq mi (92.88 km^{2})
  - Land: 35.70 sq mi (92.46 km^{2})
  - Water: 0.16 sq mi (0.41 km^{2})
- Elevation: 833 ft (254 m)

Population (2020)
  - Total: 857
  - Density: 24/sq mi (9.3/km^{2})
- Time zone: UTC-5 (Eastern (EST))
  - Summer (DST): UTC-4 (EDT)
- ZIP code(s): 49706 (Alanson); 49749 (Indian River); 49770 (Petoskey); 49799 (Wolverine)
- Area code: 231
- FIPS code: 26-53100
- GNIS feature ID: 1626725

Mentor Township is a civil township of Cheboygan County in the U.S. state of Michigan. The population was 857 at the 2020 census.

== Geography ==
Mentor Township is located in southwestern Cheboygan County and is bordered by Emmet County to the west. Interstate 75 passes through the northeast corner of the township but has no exits there. The township includes the unincorporated communities of Rondo, Haakwood, and Wildwood.

According to the United States Census Bureau, the township has a total area of 35.9 square miles (92.9 km^{2}), of which 35.7 square miles (92.5 km^{2}) is land and 0.15 square miles (0.4 km^{2}), or 0.44%, is water. The Sturgeon River flows northward through the eastern part of the township, past Haakwood and Rondo.

== Demographics ==
As of the census of 2000, there were 781 people, 317 households, and 234 families residing in the township. The population density was 21.8 inhabitants per square mile (8.4/km^{2}). There were 455 housing units at an average density of 12.7 per square mile (4.9/km^{2}). The racial makeup of the township was 96.80% White, 0.38% African American, 1.66% Native American, 0.13% from other races, and 1.02% from two or more races. Hispanic or Latino of any race were 0.77% of the population.

There were 317 households, out of which 25.2% had children under the age of 18 living with them, 63.1% were married couples living together, 6.3% had a female householder with no husband present, and 25.9% were non-families. 23.0% of all households were made up of individuals, and 10.4% had someone living alone who was 65 years of age or older. The average household size was 2.46 and the average family size was 2.86.

In the township the population was spread out, with 21.6% under the age of 18, 6.4% from 18 to 24, 28.4% from 25 to 44, 26.8% from 45 to 64, and 16.8% who were 65 years of age or older. The median age was 42 years. For every 100 females, there were 110.5 males. For every 100 females age 18 and over, there were 110.3 males.

The median income for a household in the township was $32,750, and the median income for a family was $40,486. Males had a median income of $30,795 versus $18,594 for females. The per capita income for the township was $15,888. About 13.4% of families and 14.1% of the population were below the poverty line, including 13.3% of those under age 18 and 15.9% of those age 65 or over.
