= Wyandot County, Michigan =

Former county in Michigan, United States

Coordinates: 45.33°N 84.51°W

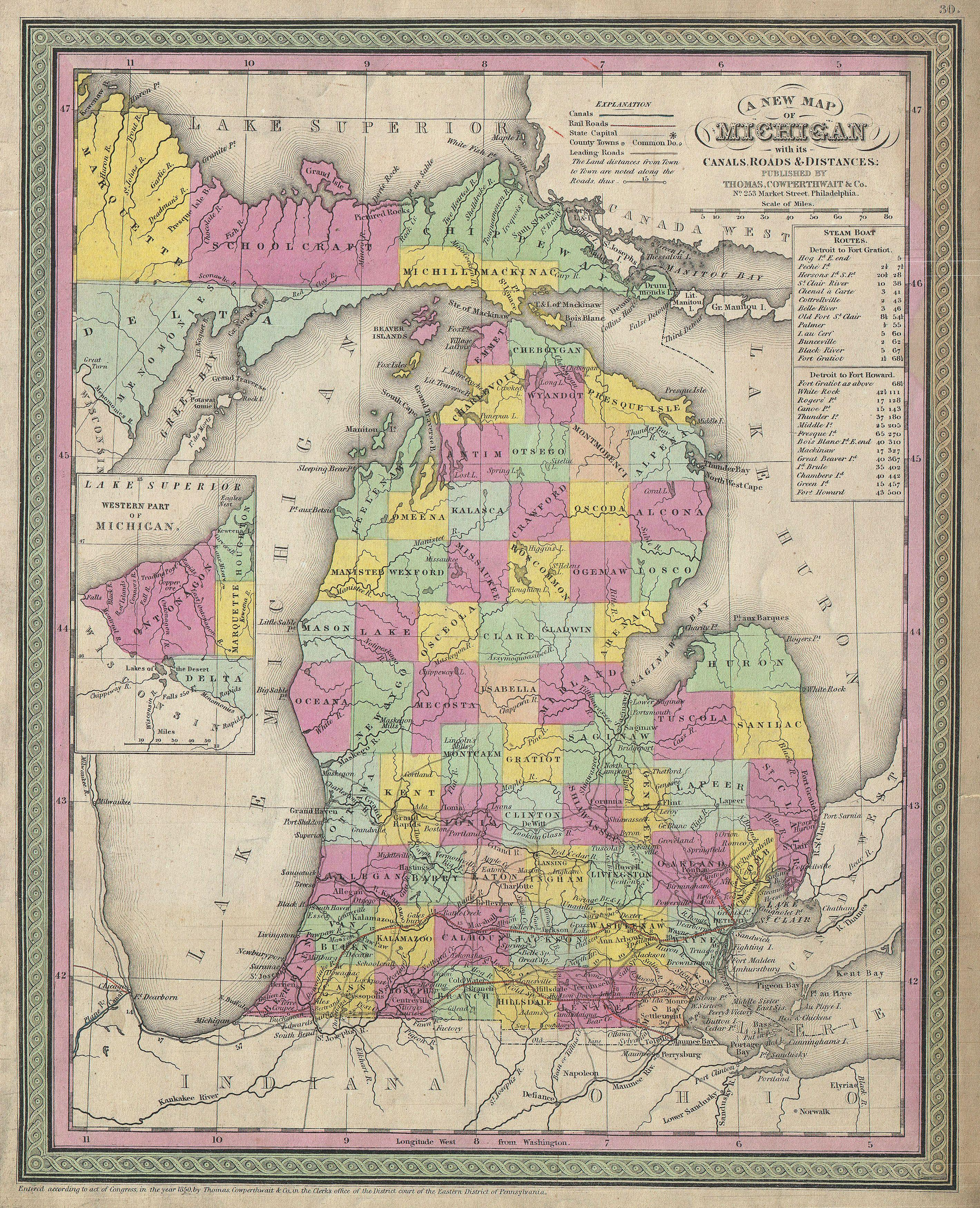
1850 map showing Cheboygan and Wyandot as separate counties.

Wyandot County was a county in the U.S. state of Michigan. It was created on April 1, 1840 from part of Michilimackinac County. Wyandot became part of Cheboygan County when it organized on January 29, 1853.
