= Grant Township, Cheboygan County, Michigan =

Grant Township, Michigan
- Civil township
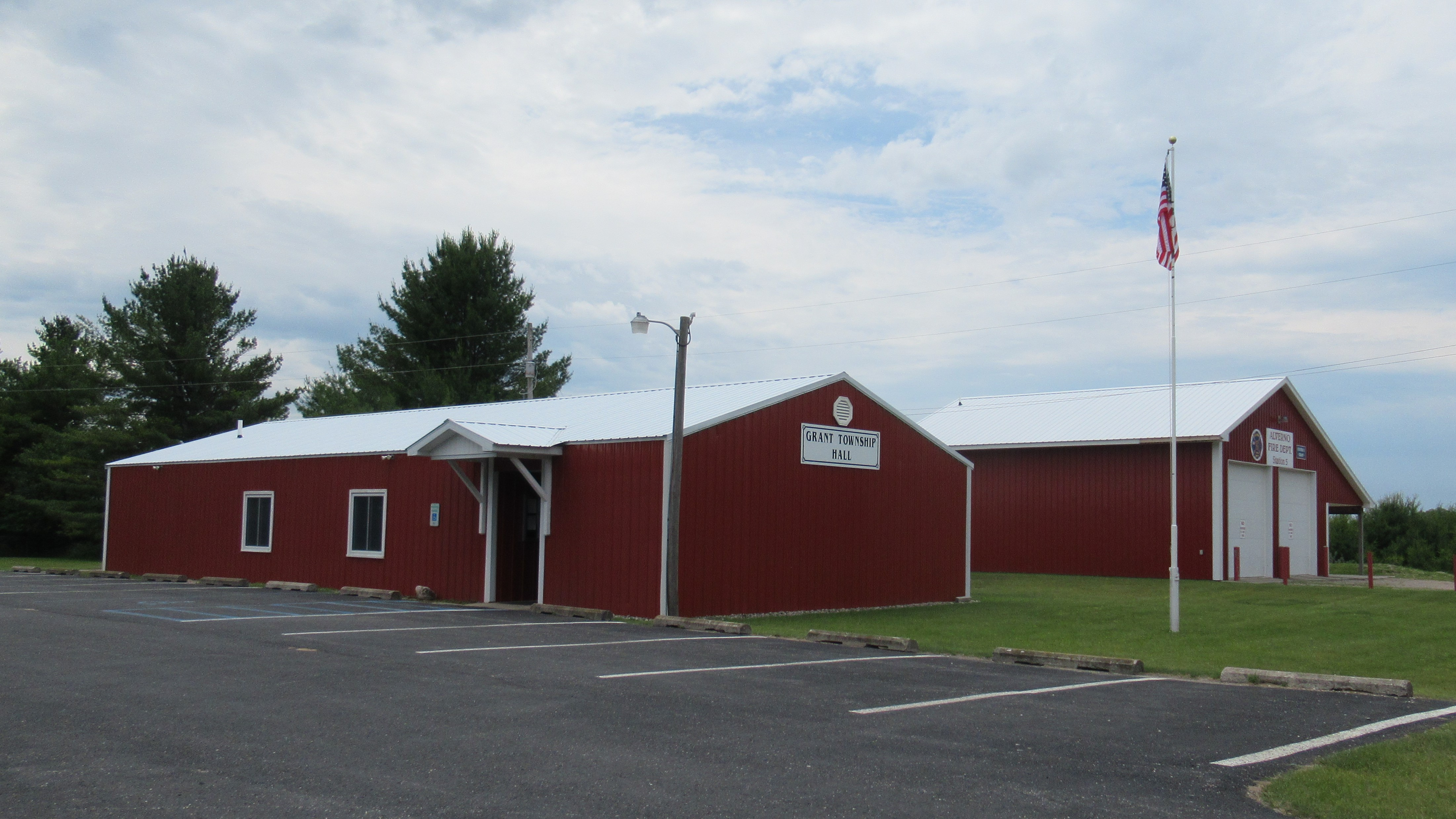
- Grant Township Hall and fire department

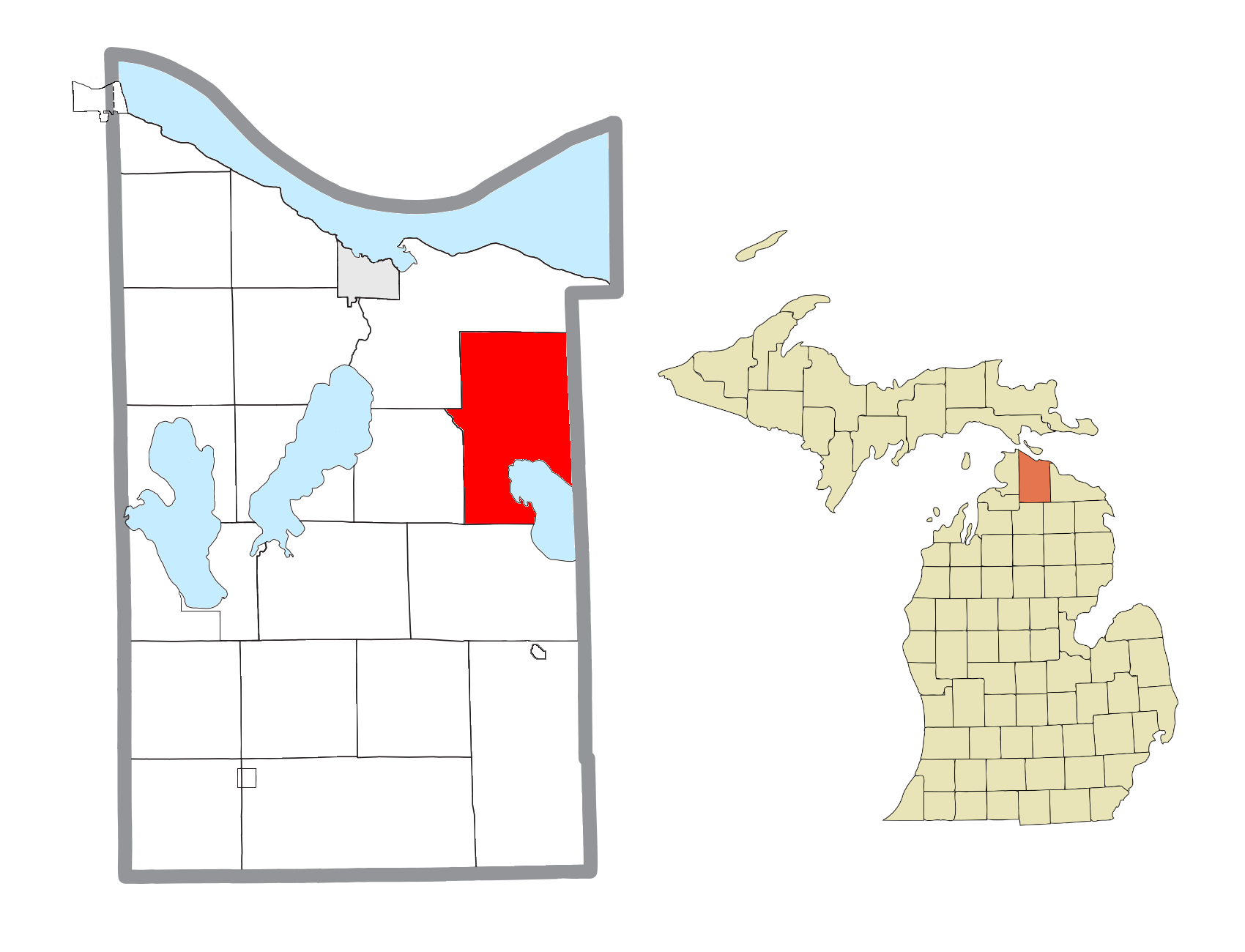
- Location within Cheboygan County

- Location within the state of Michigan Location within the United States
- Coordinates: 45°30′54″N 84°18′57″W
- Country: United States
- State: Michigan
- County: Cheboygan
- Established: 1867

Government
  - Supervisor: Clarence Archambo
  - Clerk: Theresa Berden

Area
  - Total: 57.93 sq mi (150.04 km^{2})
  - Land: 48.80 sq mi (126.39 km^{2})
  - Water: 9.13 sq mi (23.65 km^{2})
- Elevation: 669 ft (204 m)

Population (2020)
  - Total: 810
  - Density: 16.6/sq mi (6.4/km^{2})
- Time zone: UTC-5 (Eastern (EST))
  - Summer (DST): UTC-4 (EDT)
- ZIP code(s): 49721 (Cheboygan); 49765 (Onaway)
- Area code: 231
- FIPS code: 26-34200
- GNIS feature ID: 1626376
- Website: Official website

Grant Township is a civil township of Cheboygan County in the U.S. state of Michigan. As of the 2020 census, the township population was 810.

== Geography ==
Grant Township is located in eastern Cheboygan County and is bordered by Presque Isle County to the east. Black Lake occupies the southeastern corner of the township. According to the United States Census Bureau, the township has a total area of 57.9 square miles (150.0 km^{2}), of which 48.8 square miles (126.4 km^{2}) is land and 9.1 square miles (23.6 km^{2}), or 15.75%, is water.

== Demographics ==
As of the census of 2000, there were 947 people, 428 households, and 294 families residing in the township. The population density was 19.4 inhabitants per square mile (7.5/km^{2}). There were 817 housing units at an average density of 16.8 per square mile (6.5/km^{2}). The racial makeup of the township was 96.20% White, 0.42% African American, 1.48% Native American, 0.11% Pacific Islander, and 1.80% from two or more races. Hispanic or Latino of any race were 0.21% of the population.

There were 428 households, out of which 18.9% had children under the age of 18 living with them, 62.9% were married couples living together, 4.7% had a female householder with no husband present, and 31.1% were non-families. 26.9% of all households were made up of individuals, and 14.3% had someone living alone who was 65 years of age or older. The average household size was 2.21 and the average family size was 2.63.

In the township the population was spread out, with 17.3% under the age of 18, 4.0% from 18 to 24, 21.3% from 25 to 44, 30.0% from 45 to 64, and 27.3% who were 65 years of age or older. The median age was 51 years. For every 100 females, there were 114.3 males. For every 100 females age 18 and over, there were 109.4 males.

The median income for a household in the township was $32,000, and the median income for a family was $35,938. Males had a median income of $26,964 versus $22,500 for females. The per capita income for the township was $15,865. About 6.4% of families and 11.0% of the population were below the poverty line, including 20.2% of those under age 18 and 3.2% of those age 65 or over.
