= Cheboygan County, Michigan =

County in Michigan, United States

- County
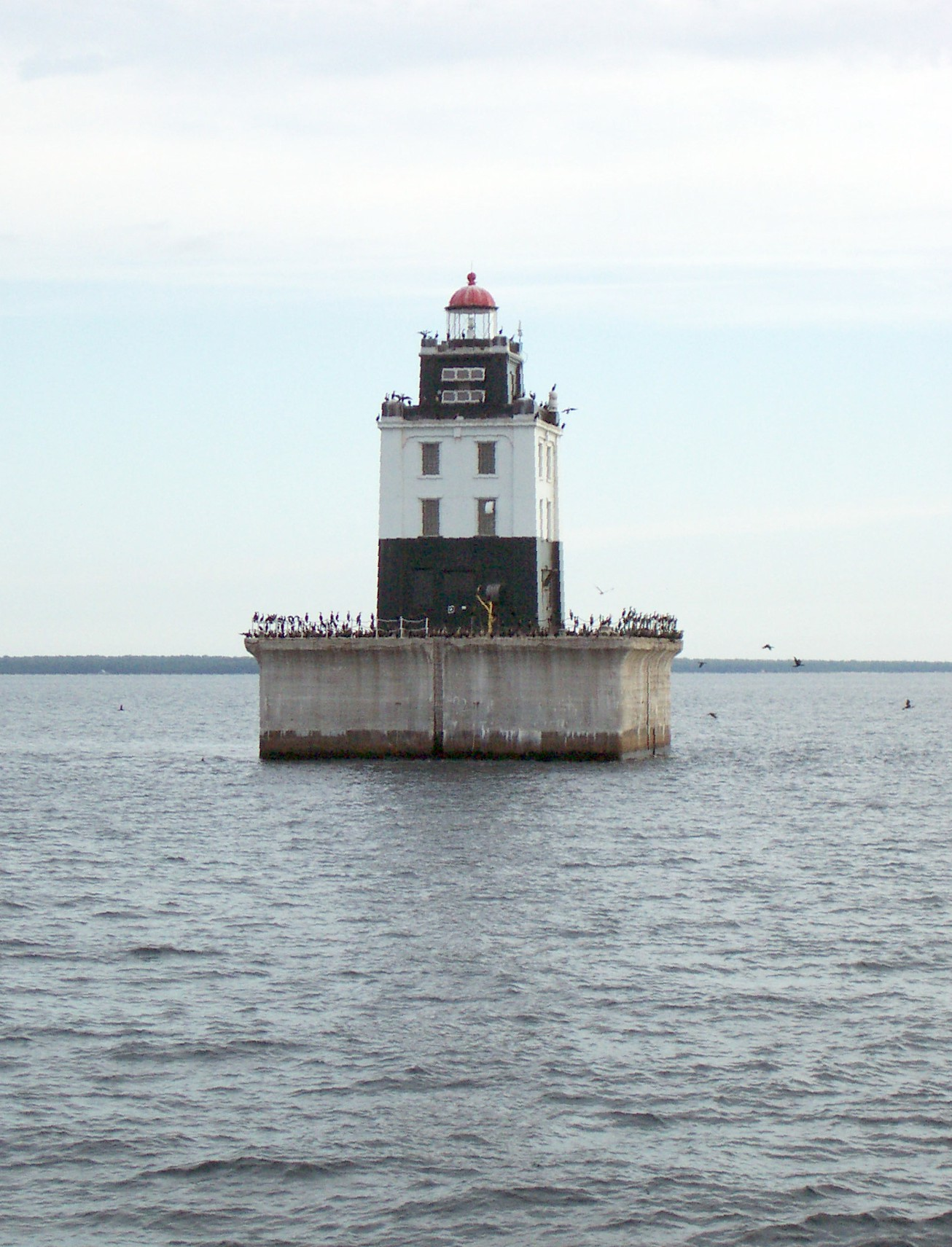
- Poe Reef Light

- Seal

- Location within the U.S. state of Michigan
- Coordinates: 45°29′N 84°30′W
- Country: United States
- State: Michigan
- Authorized: 1840
- Organized: 1853
- Seat: Cheboygan
- Largest city: Cheboygan

Area
  - Total: 885 sq mi (2,290 km^{2})
  - Land: 715 sq mi (1,850 km^{2})
  - Water: 170 sq mi (440 km^{2}) 19%

Population (2020)
  - Total: 25,579
  - Estimate (2025): 25,793 ▲
  - Density: 35.8/sq mi (13.8/km^{2})
- Time zone: UTC−5 (Eastern)
  - Summer (DST): UTC−4 (EDT)
- Congressional district: 1st
- Website: www.cheboygancounty.net

Cheboygan County (/ʃəˈbɔɪɡən/ shə-BOY-gən) is a county in the U.S. state of Michigan. As of the 2020 census, the population was 25,579. The county seat is Cheboygan. The county boundaries were set off in 1840, with land partitioned from Michilimackinac County. The Cheboygan County government was organized and combined with the former Wyandot County in 1853.

== Etymology ==
The name of the county shares the same origin as that of the Cheboygan River, although the precise meaning is no longer known. It may have come from an Ojibwe word zhaabonigan, meaning "sewing needle". Alternatively, the origin may have been Chabwegan, meaning "a place of ore". It has also been described as "a Native American word first applied to the river." See List of Michigan county name etymologies. "Cheboygan" is pronounced the same as "Sheboygan" (a city in Wisconsin).

== Geography ==
According to the U.S. Census Bureau, the county has a total area of 885 square miles (2,290 km^{2}), of which 715 square miles (1,850 km^{2}) is land and 170 square miles (440 km^{2}) (19%) is water. The county is considered to be part of Northern Michigan.

=== Adjacent counties ===
By land

- Presque Isle County - east
- Montmorency County - southeast
- Otsego County - south
- Charlevoix County - southwest
- Emmet County - west

By water

- Mackinac County - north

== Communities ==
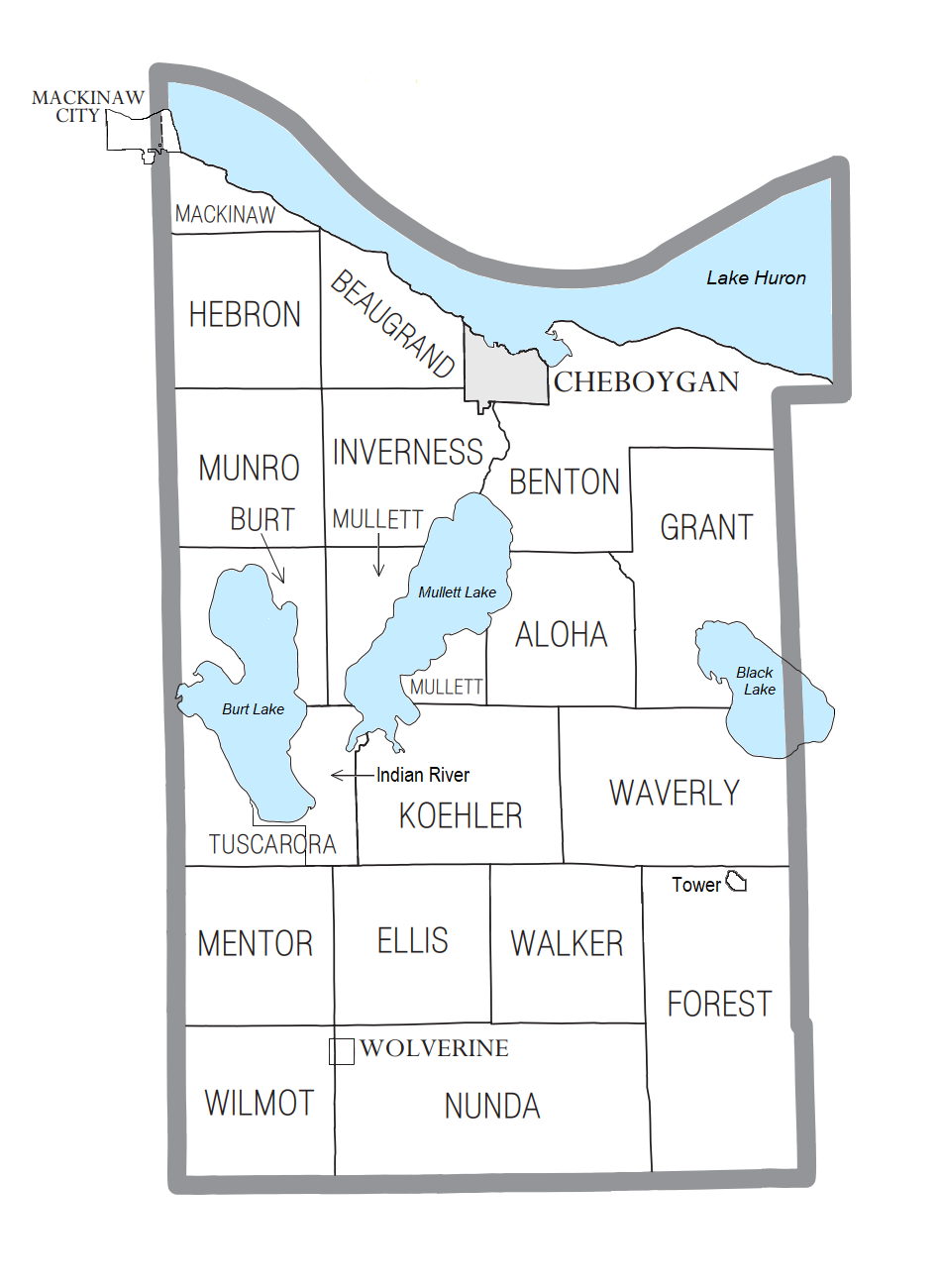
U.S. Census data map showing local municipal boundaries within Cheboygan County, as well as two CDP boundaries. Shaded areas represent incorporated cities.

=== City ===
- Cheboygan (county seat)

=== Villages ===
- Mackinaw City (part)
- Wolverine

=== Civil townships ===
- Aloha Township
- Beaugrand Township
- Benton Township
- Burt Township
- Duncan Township (defunct)
- Ellis Township
- Forest Township
- Grant Township
- Hebron Township
- Inverness Township
- Koehler Township
- Mackinaw Township
- Maple Grove Township (defunct)
- Mentor Township
- Mullett Township
- Munro Township
- Nunda Township
- Tuscarora Township
- Walker Township
- Waverly Township
- Wilmot Township

=== Census-designated places ===
- Indian River
- Tower

=== Other unincorporated communities ===
- Afton
- Aloha
- Alverno
- Birchwood
- Black Lake
- Burt Lake
- Chippewa Beach
- Cold Springs
- Elmhurst
- Fingerboard Corner
- Freedom
- Giauque Beach
- Grand View (Beaugrand Township)
- Grand View (Tuscarora Township)
- Grand View Beach
- Haakwood
- Hangore Heights
- High Banks
- Indianville
- Ingleside
- Kingsley Beach
- Legrand
- Long Point
- Mackinaw Heights
- Manning
- Miami Beach
- Mullett Lake
- Mullett Lake Woods
- Orchard Beach
- Pine Grove Beach
- Pittsburg Landing
- Point Nipigon
- Pries Landing
- Riggsville
- Rondo
- Royal Oak Beach
- Silver Beach
- Springwell Heights
- Topinabee
- Trowbridge
- Veery Point
- Wauban Beach
- Weadock
- Wildwood

=== Indian reservations ===
- Burt Lake Band of Ottawa and Chippewa Indians
- Mackinac Bands of Chippewa and Ottawa Indians

== Demographics ==
Historical population
Census	Pop.	Note	%±
1860	517		—
1870	2,196		324.8%
1880	6,524		197.1%
1890	11,986		83.7%
1900	15,516		29.5%
1910	17,872		15.2%
1920	13,991		−21.7%
1930	11,502		−17.8%
1940	13,644		18.6%
1950	13,731		0.6%
1960	14,550		6.0%
1970	16,573		13.9%
1980	20,649		24.6%
1990	21,398		3.6%
2000	26,448		23.6%
2010	26,152		−1.1%
2020	25,579		−2.2%
2025 (est.)	25,793	▲	0.8%
US Decennial Census; 1790-1960 1900-1990; 1990-2000 2010-2018

=== Racial and ethnic composition ===
Cheboygan County, Michigan – Racial and ethnic composition Note: the US Census treats Hispanic/Latino as an ethnic category. This table excludes Latinos from the racial categories and assigns them to a separate category. Hispanics/Latinos may be of any race.
Race / Ethnicity (NH = Non-Hispanic)	Pop 1980	Pop 1990	Pop 2000	Pop 2010	Pop 2020	% 1980	% 1990	% 2000	% 2010	% 2020
White alone (NH)	20,301	20,768	24,947	24,324	22,872	98.31%	97.06%	94.32%	93.01%	89.42%
Black or African American alone (NH)	13	15	62	129	89	0.06%	0.07%	0.23%	0.49%	0.35%
Native American or Alaska Native alone (NH)	240	477	660	760	687	1.16%	2.23%	2.50%	2.91%	2.69%
Asian alone (NH)	32	55	52	71	85	0.15%	0.26%	0.20%	0.27%	0.33%
Native Hawaiian or Pacific Islander alone (NH)	x	x	5	7	1	x	x	0.02%	0.03%	0.00%
Other race alone (NH)	3	3	5	8	65	0.01%	0.01%	0.02%	0.03%	0.25%
Mixed race or Multiracial (NH)	x	x	515	642	1,439	x	x	1.95%	2.45%	5.63%
Hispanic or Latino (any race)	60	80	202	211	341	0.29%	0.37%	0.76%	0.81%	1.33%
Total	20,649	21,398	26,448	26,152	25,579	100.00%	100.00%	100.00%	100.00%	100.00%

=== 2020 census ===
As of the 2020 census, the county had a population of 25,579. The median age was 51.1 years. 17.5% of residents were under the age of 18 and 27.7% of residents were 65 years of age or older. For every 100 females there were 99.2 males, and for every 100 females age 18 and over there were 98.4 males age 18 and over.

The racial makeup of the county was 90.0% White, 0.4% Black or African American, 2.8% American Indian and Alaska Native, 0.4% Asian, <0.1% Native Hawaiian and Pacific Islander, 0.4% from some other race, and 6.1% from two or more races. Hispanic or Latino residents of any race comprised 1.3% of the population.

21.2% of residents lived in urban areas, while 78.8% lived in rural areas.

There were 11,290 households in the county, of which 21.6% had children under the age of 18 living in them. Of all households, 48.8% were married-couple households, 19.4% were households with a male householder and no spouse or partner present, and 23.7% were households with a female householder and no spouse or partner present. About 30.6% of all households were made up of individuals and 16.0% had someone living alone who was 65 years of age or older.

There were 17,631 housing units, of which 36.0% were vacant. Among occupied housing units, 81.4% were owner-occupied and 18.6% were renter-occupied. The homeowner vacancy rate was 2.0% and the rental vacancy rate was 9.3%.

=== 2000 census ===
As of the 2000 census, there were 26,448 people, 10,835 households, and 7,573 families in the county. The population density was 37 people per square mile (14 people/km^{2}). There were 16,583 housing units at an average density of 23 per square mile (8.9/km^{2}).

In 2000, the racial makeup of the county was 94.80% White, 0.25% Black or African American, 2.55% Native American, 0.20% Asian, 0.02% Pacific Islander, 0.15% from other races, and 2.05% from two or more races. 0.76% of the population were Hispanic or Latino of any race. 21.4% were of German, 10.4% English, 10.0% French, 9.5% Polish, 9.2% American and 8.9% Irish ancestry. 97.7% spoke only English at home.

There were 10,835 households, out of which 28.60% had children under the age of 18 living with them, 58.00% were married couples living together, 8.60% had a female householder with no husband present, and 30.10% were non-families. 25.80% of all households were made up of individuals, and 11.80% had someone living alone who was 65 years of age or older. The average household size was 2.41 and the average family size was 2.87.

The county population contained 23.70% under the age of 18, 6.20% from 18 to 24, 25.80% from 25 to 44, 26.30% from 45 to 64, and 17.90% who were 65 years of age or older. The median age was 41 years. For every 100 females there were 98.30 males. For every 100 females age 18 and over, there were 96.50 males.

In 2000, the median income for a household in the county was $33,417, and the median income for a family was $38,390. Males had a median income of $30,054 versus $20,682 for females. The per capita income for the county was $18,088. About 8.70% of families and 12.20% of the population were below the poverty line, including 17.90% of those under age 18 and 7.10% of those age 65 or over.

== Government ==
Cheyboygan County has tended to vote Republican through the years. Since 1884 its voters have selected the Republican Party nominee in 72% (26 of 36) of the national elections.

United States presidential election results for Cheboygan County, Michigan
Year	Republican		Democratic		Third party(ies)	
Year	No.	%	No.	%	No.	%
1884	777	45.33%	897	52.33%	40	2.33%
1888	1,110	45.66%	1,237	50.88%	84	3.46%
1892	1,094	44.27%	1,224	49.53%	153	6.19%
1896	1,576	48.79%	1,617	50.06%	37	1.15%
1900	2,092	59.08%	1,398	39.48%	51	1.44%
1904	2,572	70.10%	979	26.68%	118	3.22%
1908	2,053	58.94%	1,205	34.60%	225	6.46%
1912	896	27.69%	981	30.32%	1,359	42.00%
1916	1,576	51.17%	1,389	45.10%	115	3.73%
1920	2,472	63.47%	1,281	32.89%	142	3.65%
1924	2,683	64.16%	994	23.77%	505	12.08%
1928	2,743	60.34%	1,784	39.24%	19	0.42%
1932	2,309	39.73%	3,431	59.04%	71	1.22%
1936	2,584	43.00%	3,016	50.19%	409	6.81%
1940	3,646	55.89%	2,856	43.78%	21	0.32%
1944	2,943	57.53%	2,141	41.85%	32	0.63%
1948	3,184	62.32%	1,842	36.05%	83	1.62%
1952	4,385	69.50%	1,900	30.12%	24	0.38%
1956	4,379	69.55%	1,910	30.34%	7	0.11%
1960	3,817	56.17%	2,977	43.81%	2	0.03%
1964	2,342	36.70%	4,028	63.12%	11	0.17%
1968	3,422	49.60%	2,840	41.17%	637	9.23%
1972	4,529	59.11%	2,985	38.96%	148	1.93%
1976	4,894	55.13%	3,880	43.70%	104	1.17%
1980	5,221	52.45%	3,938	39.56%	795	7.99%
1984	6,053	64.04%	3,358	35.53%	41	0.43%
1988	5,395	57.52%	3,943	42.04%	42	0.45%
1992	3,864	35.57%	4,459	41.04%	2,541	23.39%
1996	4,244	39.18%	5,018	46.32%	1,571	14.50%
2000	6,815	54.01%	5,484	43.47%	318	2.52%
2004	7,798	56.15%	5,941	42.78%	148	1.07%
2008	6,920	49.78%	6,720	48.34%	261	1.88%
2012	7,286	54.58%	5,831	43.68%	233	1.75%
2016	8,683	63.51%	4,302	31.47%	687	5.02%
2020	10,186	64.10%	5,437	34.22%	267	1.68%
2024	10,653	64.87%	5,543	33.75%	227	1.38%

United States Senate election results for Cheboygan County, Michigan1
Year	Republican		Democratic		Third party(ies)	
Year	No.	%	No.	%	No.	%
2024	10,259	63.47%	5,445	33.69%	460	2.85%

Michigan Gubernatorial election results for Cheyboygan County
Year	Republican		Democratic		Third party(ies)	
Year	No.	%	No.	%	No.	%
2022	7,707	57.80%	5,357	40.18%	270	2.02%

Cheyboygan County operates the County jail, maintains rural roads, operates the major local courts, records deeds, mortgages, and vital records, administers public health regulations, and participates with the state in the provision of social services. The county board of commissioners controls the budget and has limited authority to make laws or ordinances. In Michigan, most local government functions – police and fire, building and zoning, tax assessment, street maintenance etc. – are the responsibility of individual cities and townships.

=== Elected officials ===
- Prosecuting Attorney: Melissa Goodrich
- Sheriff: Todd A. Ross
- County Clerk/Register of Deeds: Karen Brewster
- County Treasurer: Buffy Jo Weldon
- Drain Commissioner: Willie Neelis
- County Surveyor: James H. Granger

(information as of September 2018)

== Historical markers ==
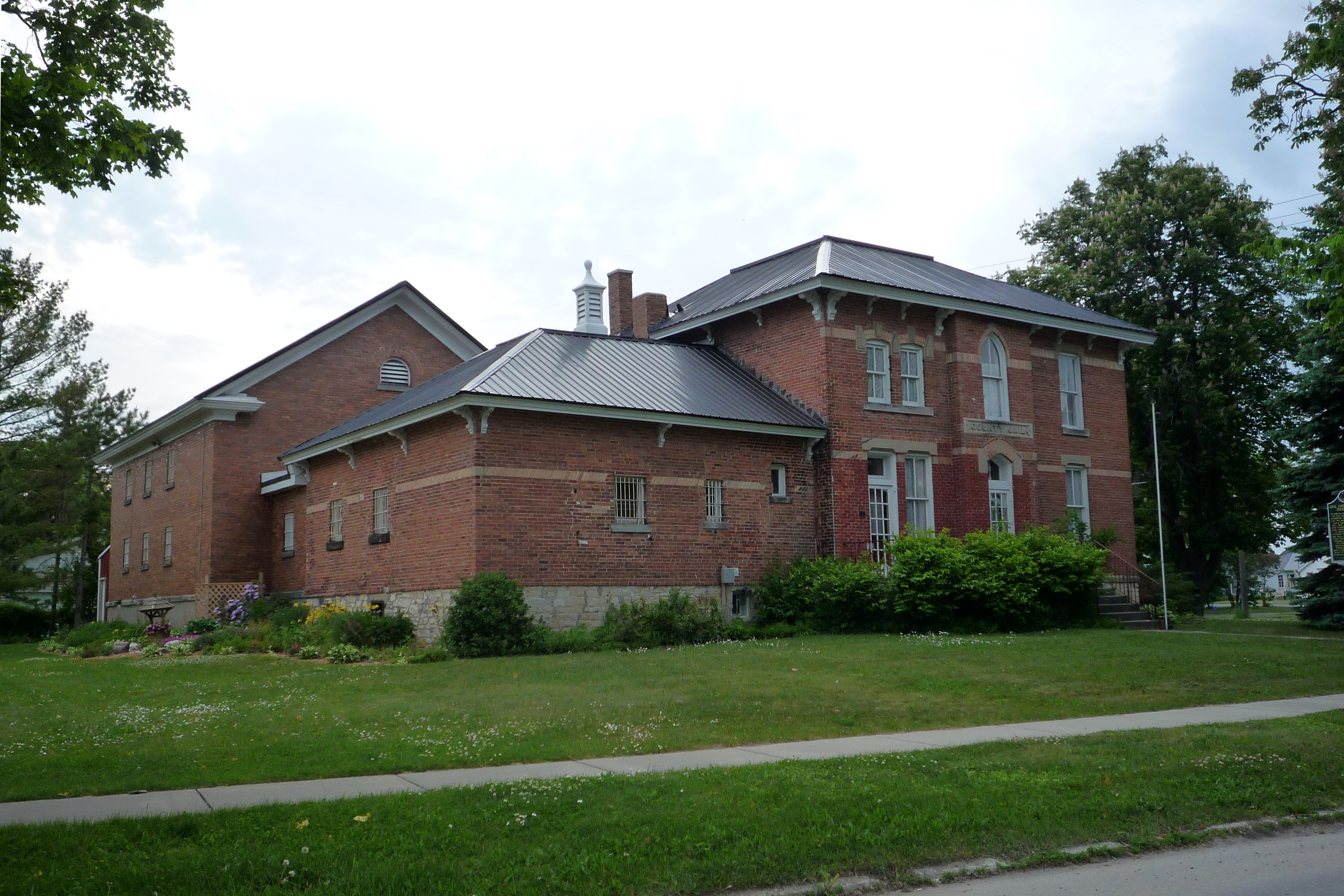
Jail and Sheriff's Residence, now the Cheboygan County Historical Museum Complex

There are eight recognized Michigan historical markers in the county:

- Forty Mile Point Lighthouse / Graveyard of Ships
- Inland Waterway
- Jacob J. Post House
- Jail and Sheriff's Residence
- Newton–Allaire House
- Old Cheboygan County Courthouse
- St. Bernard Catholic Church
- St. Mary's Church

== Transportation ==
=== Highways ===
- I-75
- US 23
- US 31
- M-27
- M-33
- M-68
- M-108 (former highway)
- M-212

=== County-designated highways ===
- C-58
- C-64
- C-66
- F-05

=== Airports ===
- Cheboygan County Airport, located in Cheboygan, is a private airport. There are no commercial airline airports in Cheboygan County but the nearest ones are Alpena County Regional Airport, Chippewa County International Airport (Sault Ste. Marie, MI), and Cherry Capital Airport (Traverse City). Delta Air Lines schedules flights daily out of the Pellston Regional Airport.

== See also ==
- List of Michigan State Historic Sites in Cheboygan County
- National Register of Historic Places listings in Cheboygan County, Michigan
- USS Cheboygan County
