= List of counties in Michigan =

Counties of Michigan
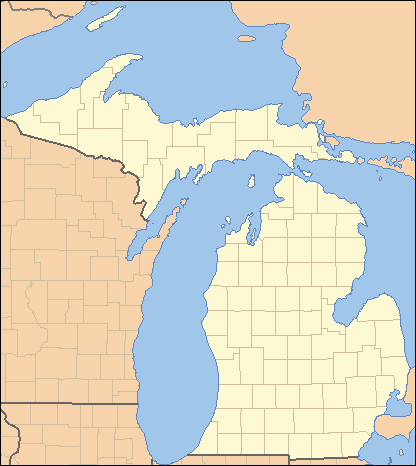
- Location: Michigan
- Number: 83
- Populations: 2,186 (Keweenaw) – 1,769,038 (Wayne)
- Areas: 508 square miles (1,320 km^{2}) (Cass) – 5,966 square miles (15,450 km^{2}) (Keweenaw)
- Government: County government
- Subdivisions: Cities, charter townships, civil townships, villages, unincorporated communities, census-designated places

There are 83 counties in the U.S. state of Michigan; these boundaries of counties have not changed substantially since 1897. However, throughout the 19th century, the state legislature frequently adjusted county boundaries. County creation was intended to fulfill the goal of establishing government over unorganized territory, but a more important goal was encouraging settlement by surveying the land and dividing it into saleable sections.

The creation of counties generally occurred in two stages. First the boundaries of a county were declared, and the county given a name. The county appeared on maps, even though this may have been the entire extent of a county's tangible existence for several years. During this period, the as-yet–unorganized county was attached to another already organized county for administrative purposes. The legislature frequently changed the administrative attachment of these unorganized counties. Residents of such an attached county could petition the legislature for organization, which was the granting of full legal recognition to the county.

There are many cities and villages that span county boundaries in Michigan, including its capital, Lansing. For a few years during the early 1970s, split cities briefly had authority to petition to change the county boundaries to accord with the city boundaries. The only city to take advantage of this brief opportunity was New Baltimore (previously split between Macomb County and St. Clair County; now completely in Macomb). This transfer of territory from St. Clair to Macomb was the only county boundary change in Michigan since the early 20th century.

The state constitution of 1850 permitted an incorporated city with a population of at least 20,000 to be organized into a separate county of its own. The Constitution of 1908 retained this provision, but raised the population threshold to 100,000. No city was ever organized into an independent county in this fashion and when a new Constitution took effect in 1963, the provision was removed.

Michigan's boundary with Illinois is formed by Lake Michigan, and three counties have water boundaries with Illinois: Berrien County, Van Buren County, and Allegan County. Michigan also has a boundary with Minnesota, which is formed by Lake Superior. The water boundary in this instance is formed by two counties: Ontonagon County and Keweenaw County. The land boundary with Wisconsin continues into Lake Superior, involving both Gogebic County (which shares a land border) and Ontonagon County (water boundary only).

== Etymologies ==
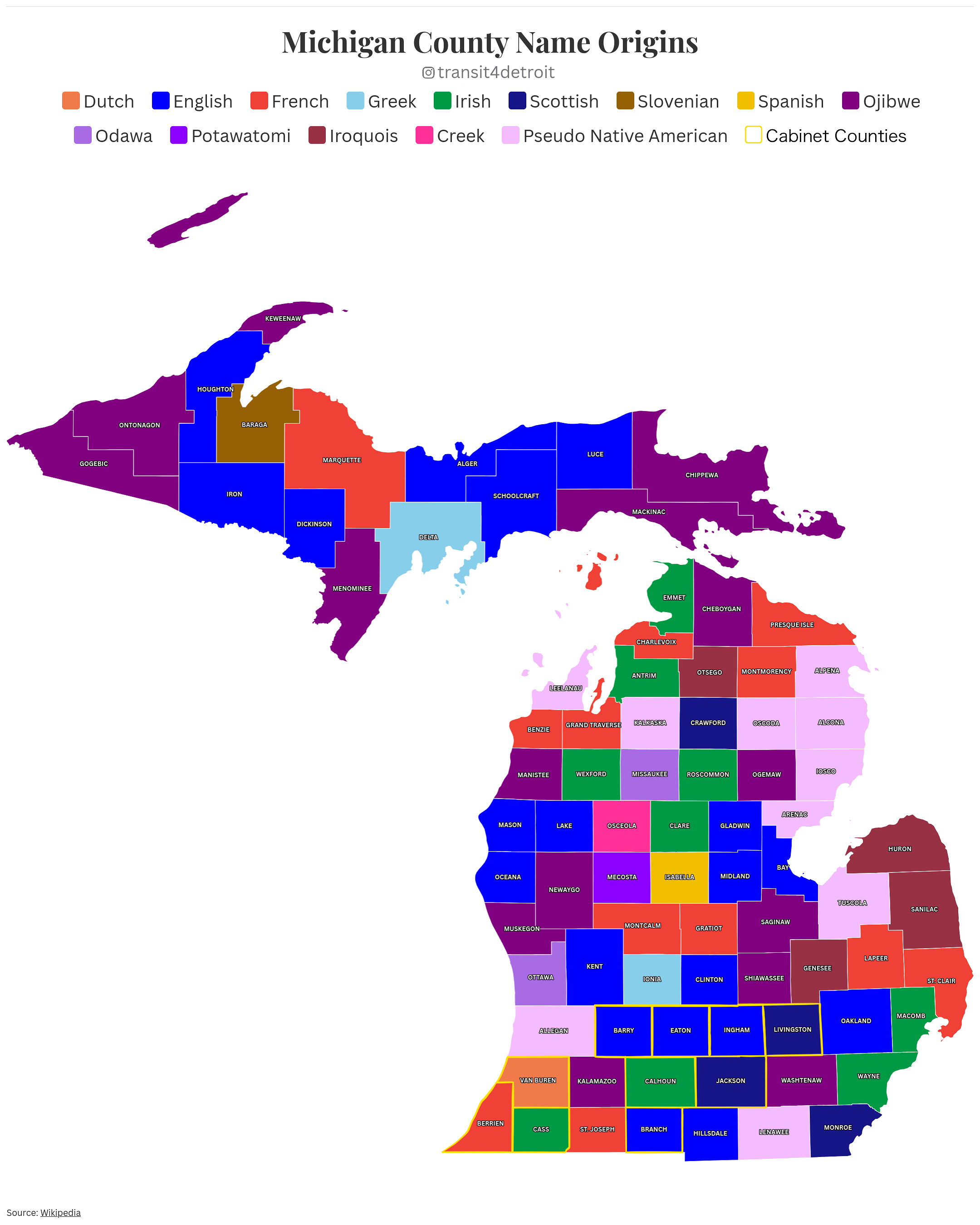
Historical Etymology of Michigan Counties

Nine counties have names invented by the ethnologist Henry Schoolcraft, usually adapted from parts of Native American words; some of these have parts from Greek, Arabic or Latin roots. Schoolcraft's coinages include disputed sources. While he was a devotee of Native American words and culture, he may derived some of his coinages from tribes other areas of the U.S., such as New York, or the Northeast (from where many settlers to Michigan had come). Some original native words were eradicated, by his substitution of novel names, sometimes with a kernel of Indian language or sound in them.

A second group of four counties were renamed for Irish locales (counties Antrim, Clare, Roscommon and Wexford), apparently because it was close to the heart for certain Michigan legislators or their constituents.

Ten counties, the so-called "cabinet counties", were named for persons who served in Andrew Jackson's presidential administration, which was tied to Michigan's anticipated ascendancy to statehood. Eight were named in 1829. Livingston County was named in 1833. Cass County was also named in 1829, but Governor Lewis Cass did not become a member of Jackson's Cabinet until 1831.

The FIPS county code is the five-digit Federal Information Processing Standard (FIPS) code which uniquely identifies counties and county equivalents in the United States. The three-digit number is unique to each individual county within a state, but to be unique within the entire United States, it must be prefixed by the state code. This means that, for example, the number 001 is shared by Alcona County, Michigan, Adams County, Wisconsin, and Adair County, Iowa. To uniquely identify Alcona County, Michigan, one must use the state code of 26 plus the county code of 001; therefore, the unique nationwide identifier for Alcona County, Michigan is 26001. The links in the column FIPS County Code are to the Census Bureau Info page for that county.

== List of counties ==
County	FIPS code	County seat	Est.	Origin	Etymology	Population (2025)	Area	Map
Alcona County	001	Harrisville	April 1, 1840	From unorganized territory; named Negwegon County until 1843	Schoolcraft pseudo-Native American name	10,556	675 sq mi (1,748 km^{2})	State map highlighting Alcona County
Alger County	003	Munising	March 17, 1885	From part of Schoolcraft County	Russell A. Alger, (1836-1907): Governor and national politician	8,641	915 sq mi (2,370 km^{2})	State map highlighting Alger County
Allegan County	005	Allegan	March 2, 1831	From part of Barry County, and unorganized territory	Schoolcraft pseudo-Native American name	123,188	825 sq mi (2,137 km^{2})	State map highlighting Allegan County
Alpena County	007	Alpena	April 1, 1840	From part of Mackinac County, and unorganized territory Was named Anamickee County until 1843.	Schoolcraft pseudo-Native American name	28,853	572 sq mi (1,481 km^{2})	State map highlighting Alpena County
Antrim County	009	Bellaire	April 1, 1840	From part of Mackinac County; named Meegisee County until 1843	County Antrim, now in Northern Ireland	24,698	476 sq mi (1,233 km^{2})	State map highlighting Antrim County
Arenac County	011	Standish	March 2, 1831	From unorganized territory; annexed to Bay County in 1857, but reinstated in 1883	Schoolcraft pseudo-Native American name	15,068	363 sq mi (940 km^{2})	State map highlighting Arenac County
Baraga County	013	L'Anse	February 19, 1875	From part of Houghton County	Frederic Baraga (1797-1868): Catholic missionary and first bishop of Sault Ste. Marie	8,169	898 sq mi (2,326 km^{2})	State map highlighting Baraga County
Barry County	015	Hastings	October 29, 1829	From unorganized territory	William T. Barry (1784-1835): Postmaster General in the Jackson Administration	63,991	553 sq mi (1,432 km^{2})	State map highlighting Barry County
Bay County	017	Bay City	April 20, 1857	From parts of Arenac, Midland, and Saginaw Counties	Saginaw Bay	102,123	442 sq mi (1,145 km^{2})	State map highlighting Bay County
Benzie County	019	Beulah	February 27, 1863	From part of Leelanau County	French name of Betsie River: (rivière aux) Bec-scies, the "(river of) sawbill ducks"	18,568	320 sq mi (829 km^{2})	State map highlighting Benzie County
Berrien County	021	St. Joseph	October 29, 1829	From unorganized territory	John M. Berrien (1781-1856): Attorney General in the Jackson Administration	152,444	568 sq mi (1,471 km^{2})	State map highlighting Berrien County
Branch County	023	Coldwater	October 29, 1829	From unorganized territory	John Branch (1782-1863): Secretary of the Navy in the Jackson Administration	45,993	506 sq mi (1,311 km^{2})	State map highlighting Branch County
Calhoun County	025	Marshall	October 29, 1829	From unorganized territory	John C. Calhoun (1782-1850): Vice President of the United States in the Jackson Administration	133,408	706 sq mi (1,829 km^{2})	State map highlighting Calhoun County
Cass County	027	Cassopolis	October 29, 1829	From unorganized territory	Lewis Cass (1782-1866): Secretary of War in the Jackson Administration	51,677	490 sq mi (1,269 km^{2})	State map highlighting Cass County
Charlevoix County	029	Charlevoix	April 1, 1840	From parts of Antrim, Emmet, and Otsego Counties	Pierre François Xavier de Charlevoix (1682-1761): Jesuit traveller and historian of New France	26,036	416 sq mi (1,077 km^{2})	State map highlighting Charlevoix County
Cheboygan County	031	Cheboygan	April 1, 1840	From part of Mackinac County	Cheboygan River	25,793	715 sq mi (1,852 km^{2})	State map highlighting Cheboygan County
Chippewa County	033	Sault Ste. Marie	February 1, 1827	From part of Mackinac County	Ojibwa Native American tribe, also known as the Chippewa	36,081	1,559 sq mi (4,038 km^{2})	State map highlighting Chippewa County
Clare County	035	Harrison	April 1, 1840	From part of Mackinac County, and unorganized territory; named Kaykakee County until 1843	County Clare, Ireland	31,543	564 sq mi (1,461 km^{2})	State map highlighting Clare County
Clinton County	037	St. Johns	March 2, 1831	From unorganized territory	DeWitt Clinton (1769-1828): Governor of New York.	80,432	566 sq mi (1,466 km^{2})	State map highlighting Clinton County
Crawford County	039	Grayling	April 1, 1840	From part of Mackinac County and unorganized territory. Was named Shawano County until 1843.	William Crawford, (1732-82), American Revolutionary War colonel western surveyor	13,722	556 sq mi (1,440 km^{2})	State map highlighting Crawford County
Delta County	041	Escanaba	March 9, 1843	From part of Mackinac County and unorganized territory.	Greek letter delta, referring to the triangular shape of the original county, which included segments of Menominee, Dickinson, Iron and Marquette counties	36,582	1,171 sq mi (3,033 km^{2})	State map highlighting Delta County
Dickinson County	043	Iron Mountain	May 21, 1891	From parts of Iron County, Marquette County and Menominee County.	Donald M. Dickinson (1846-1917): Postmaster General in the Cleveland Administration	25,827	761 sq mi (1,971 km^{2})	State map highlighting Dickinson County
Eaton County	045	Charlotte	October 29, 1829	From unorganized territory.	John Eaton (1790-1856): Secretary of War in the Jackson Administration	109,581	575 sq mi (1,489 km^{2})	State map highlighting Eaton County
Emmet County	047	Petoskey	April 1, 1840	From part of Mackinac County. Was named Tonegadana County until 1843.	Robert Emmet (1778-1803): Irish nationalist and rebel leader	33,775	468 sq mi (1,212 km^{2})	State map highlighting Emmet County
Genesee County	049	Flint	March 28, 1835	From parts of Lapeer County, Saginaw County and Shiawassee County.	Seneca word, "je-nis-hi-yeh," meaning "beautiful valley": named after western New York valley from which many settlers came	401,093	637 sq mi (1,650 km^{2})	State map highlighting Genesee County
Gladwin County	051	Gladwin	March 2, 1831	From unorganized territory.	Major Henry Gladwin, British commander of the fort at Detroit during the siege by Chief Pontiac in 1763-64.	26,077	502 sq mi (1,300 km^{2})	State map highlighting Gladwin County
Gogebic County	053	Bessemer	February 7, 1887	From part of Ontonagon County.	Probably from the Chippewa "bic" which most references interpret as "rock."	14,285	1,102 sq mi (2,854 km^{2})	State map highlighting Gogebic County
Grand Traverse County	055	Traverse City	April 7, 1851	From part of Mackinac County; named Omeena County until 1851.	French grande traverse (Note: In modern standard French, la grande traversée; as the sense of 'crossing' is obsolete for traverse.) ("long crossing"), given first to Grand Traverse Bay by French voyageurs.	96,729	464 sq mi (1,202 km^{2})	State map highlighting Grand Traverse County
Gratiot County	057	Ithaca	March 2, 1831	From unorganized territory.	Captain Charles Gratiot (1788-1855), built Fort Gratiot at the present site of Port Huron	41,190	568 sq mi (1,471 km^{2})	State map highlighting Gratiot County
Hillsdale County	059	Hillsdale	October 29, 1829	From unorganized territory.	From its terrain, made up of hills and dales.	45,738	598 sq mi (1,549 km^{2})	State map highlighting Hillsdale County
Houghton County	061	Houghton	March 19, 1845	From parts of Marquette County and Ontonagon County.	Douglass Houghton (1809-1845), first state geologist of Michigan, physician and surgeon, mayor of Detroit (1842-1843)	37,842	1,009 sq mi (2,613 km^{2})	State map highlighting Houghton County
Huron County	063	Bad Axe	April 1, 1840	From part of Sanilac County.	Lake Huron, which the French named lac des Hurons after the Hurons.	30,530	836 sq mi (2,165 km^{2})	State map highlighting Huron County
Ingham County	065	Mason	October 29, 1829	From parts of Shiawassee County, Washtenaw County and unorganized territory.	Samuel D. Ingham (1779-1860), U.S. Secretary of the Treasury in the Jackson Administration	289,709	556 sq mi (1,440 km^{2})	State map highlighting Ingham County
Ionia County	067	Ionia	March 2, 1831	From part of Mackinac County and unorganized territory.	Province in ancient Greece	66,557	571 sq mi (1,479 km^{2})	State map highlighting Ionia County
Iosco County	069	Tawas City	April 1, 1840	From unorganized territory. Was named Kanotin County until 1843.	Schoolcraft pseudo-Native American name	25,266	549 sq mi (1,422 km^{2})	State map highlighting Iosco County
Iron County	071	Crystal Falls	April 3, 1885	From parts of Marquette County and Menominee County.	For the iron deposits and mines found in the county	11,757	1,166 sq mi (3,020 km^{2})	State map highlighting Iron County
Isabella County	073	Mt. Pleasant	March 2, 1831	From part of Mackinac County and unorganized territory.	Queen Isabella I (1451-1504) of Spain, under whose patronage Columbus undertook his voyages.	64,691	573 sq mi (1,484 km^{2})	State map highlighting Isabella County
Jackson County	075	Jackson	October 29, 1829	From part of Washtenaw County and unorganized territory.	Andrew Jackson (1767-1845), 7th President of the United States and President when Michigan was admitted to the Union	159,552	702 sq mi (1,818 km^{2})	State map highlighting Jackson County
Kalamazoo County	077	Kalamazoo	October 29, 1829	From unorganized territory.	Named for the Kalamazoo River. See Etymology of Kalamazoo for a discussion of the river's name.	263,795	562 sq mi (1,456 km^{2})	State map highlighting Kalamazoo County
Kalkaska County	079	Kalkaska	April 1, 1840	From part of Mackinac County. Was named Wabassee County until 1843.	Schoolcraft pseudo-Native American name	18,693	560 sq mi (1,450 km^{2})	State map highlighting Kalkaska County
Kent County	081	Grand Rapids	March 2, 1831	From part of Mackinac County and unorganized territory.	New York jurist James Kent, who represented the Michigan Territory in its dispute with Ohio over the Toledo Strip.	675,232	849 sq mi (2,199 km^{2})	State map highlighting Kent County
Keweenaw County	083	Eagle River	March 11, 1861	From part of Houghton County.	Ojibwe word gakiiwe-wewaning meaning "portage"	2,186	540 sq mi (1,399 km^{2})	State map highlighting Keweenaw County
Lake County	085	Baldwin	April 1, 1840	From part of Mackinac County. Was named Aischum County until 1843.	Has several small lakes and lies near Lake Michigan	13,182	568 sq mi (1,471 km^{2})	State map highlighting Lake County
Lapeer County	087	Lapeer	September 10, 1822	From parts of Oakland County and St. Clair County.	An Americanization of the French la pierre, meaning "the rock" (flint)	89,516	647 sq mi (1,676 km^{2})	State map highlighting Lapeer County
Leelanau County	089	Suttons Bay Township	April 1, 1840	From part of Mackinac County.	Schoolcraft pseudo-Native American name	22,982	347 sq mi (899 km^{2})	State map highlighting Leelanau County
Lenawee County	091	Adrian	September 10, 1822	From part of Monroe County.	A Schoolcraft pseudo-Native American name for man, from either the Delaware leno or lenno or the Shawnee lenawai	97,779	750 sq mi (1,942 km^{2})	State map highlighting Lenawee County
Livingston County	093	Howell	March 21, 1833	From parts of Shiawassee County and Washtenaw County.	Edward Livingston (1764-1836): second Secretary of State in the Andrew Jackson administration	197,315	565 sq mi (1,463 km^{2})	State map highlighting Livingston County
Luce County	095	Newberry	March 1, 1887	From parts of Chippewa County and Mackinac County.	Named for Michigan Governor Cyrus G. Luce	6,339	899 sq mi (2,328 km^{2})	State map highlighting Luce County
Mackinac County	097	St. Ignace	December 3, 1818	From part of Wayne County. Was named Michilimackinac County until 1837.	Originally Michilimackinac, believed to be a French interpretation of the Native American name for Mackinac Island, meaning "big turtle"	11,236	1,022 sq mi (2,647 km^{2})	State map highlighting Mackinac County
Macomb County	099	Mt. Clemens	January 15, 1818	From part of Wayne County.	Named for U.S. General Alexander Macomb, a notable officer of the War of 1812	886,221	479 sq mi (1,241 km^{2})	State map highlighting Macomb County
Manistee County	101	Manistee	April 1, 1840	From part of Mackinac County.	Named for the Manistee River, which in turn is from the Ojibwe name, ministigweyaa meaning "(river) at whose mouth there are islands"	25,656	542 sq mi (1,404 km^{2})	State map highlighting Manistee County
Marquette County	103	Marquette	March 9, 1843	From parts of Chippewa County and Mackinac County.	Named for French Jesuit missionary Jacques Marquette	68,064	1,809 sq mi (4,685 km^{2})	State map highlighting Marquette County
Mason County	105	Ludington	April 1, 1840	From part of Mackinac County. Was named Notipekago County until 1843.	Named for Michigan Governor Stevens T. Mason	29,040	495 sq mi (1,282 km^{2})	State map highlighting Mason County
Mecosta County	107	Big Rapids	April 1, 1840	From parts of Mackinac County and Oceana County.	Named for Mecosta, a Native American leader	42,320	555 sq mi (1,437 km^{2})	State map highlighting Mecosta County
Menominee County	109	Menominee	March 15, 1861	From part of Delta County. Was named Bleeker County until 1863.	Named for the Menominee Native American people	22,941	1,044 sq mi (2,704 km^{2})	State map highlighting Menominee County
Midland County	111	Midland	March 2, 1831	From part of Saginaw County and unorganized territory.	Located near the geographical center of the Lower Peninsula	83,754	517 sq mi (1,339 km^{2})	State map highlighting Midland County
Missaukee County	113	Lake City	April 1, 1840	From part of Mackinac County.	Named for Missaukee, an Ottawa leader who signed land-grant treaties in 1831 and 1833	15,274	565 sq mi (1,463 km^{2})	State map highlighting Missaukee County
Monroe County	115	Monroe	July 14, 1817	From part of Wayne County.	Named for James Monroe, the fifth U.S. President	156,004	549 sq mi (1,422 km^{2})	State map highlighting Monroe County
Montcalm County	117	Stanton	March 2, 1831	From part of Mackinac County and unorganized territory.	Named for Louis-Joseph de Montcalm, a French military commander in Quebec	69,406	705 sq mi (1,826 km^{2})	State map highlighting Montcalm County
Montmorency County	119	Atlanta	April 1, 1840	From part of Mackinac County and unorganized territory. Was named Cheonoquet County until 1843.	House of Montmorency, influential in the history of French Canada	9,842	547 sq mi (1,417 km^{2})	State map highlighting Montmorency County
Muskegon County	121	Muskegon	February 4, 1859	From parts of Oceana County and Ottawa County.	Muskegon River running through county, from the Ojibwa/Chippewa word mashkig meaning "swamp" or "marsh."	177,901	504 sq mi (1,305 km^{2})	State map highlighting Muskegon County
Newaygo County	123	White Cloud	April 1, 1840	From parts of Mackinac County and Oceana County.	Named for a Chippewa leader who signed the Saginaw Treaty of 1819	51,622	839 sq mi (2,173 km^{2})	State map highlighting Newaygo County
Oakland County	125	Pontiac	March 28, 1820	From part of Macomb County.	The numerous "oak openings" in the area: "majestic orchard[s] of oaks and hickories varied by small prairies, grassy lawns and clear lakes"	1,288,337	867 sq mi (2,246 km^{2})	State map highlighting Oakland County
Oceana County	127	Hart	March 2, 1831	From part of Mackinac County.	Borders Lake Michigan, the freshwater "ocean."	27,177	538 sq mi (1,393 km^{2})	State map highlighting Oceana County
Ogemaw County	129	West Branch	April 1, 1840	From unorganized territory. Annexed to Iosco County in 1867 and reinstated in 1873.	The Ojibwe word ogimaa, meaning "chief" or "leader"	21,121	538 sq mi (1,393 km^{2})	State map highlighting Ogemaw County
Ontonagon County	131	Ontonagon	March 9, 1843	From parts of Chippewa County and Mackinac County.	Named for the Ontonagon River. The Ojibwa word onagon means "dish" or "bowl."	5,823	1,311 sq mi (3,395 km^{2})	State map highlighting Ontonagon County
Osceola County	133	Reed City	April 1, 1840	From part of Mackinac County. Was named Unwattin County until 1843.	Osceola (1804-1838), Seminole chief	23,516	566 sq mi (1,466 km^{2})	State map highlighting Osceola County
Oscoda County	135	Mio	April 1, 1840	From part of Mackinac County and unorganized territory.	Schoolcraft pseudo-Native American name	8,723	566 sq mi (1,466 km^{2})	State map highlighting Oscoda County
Otsego County	137	Gaylord	April 1, 1840	From part of Mackinac County. Was named Okkudo County until 1843.	Named for Otsego County, New York	26,080	515 sq mi (1,334 km^{2})	State map highlighting Otsego County
Ottawa County	139	Grand Haven	March 2, 1831	From part of Mackinac County and unorganized territory.	Named for the Native American Ottawa people.	308,459	564 sq mi (1,461 km^{2})	State map highlighting Ottawa County
Presque Isle County	141	Rogers City	April 1, 1840	From part of Mackinac County.	A derivation of the French phrase for "peninsula", literally "almost an island."	13,128	659 sq mi (1,707 km^{2})	State map highlighting Presque Isle County
Roscommon County	143	Roscommon	April 1, 1840	From part of Mackinac County and unorganized territory. Was named Mikenauk County until 1843.	County Roscommon, Ireland	23,914	520 sq mi (1,347 km^{2})	State map highlighting Roscommon County
Saginaw County	145	Saginaw	September 10, 1822	From part of Oakland County.	A Native American term, perhaps a reference to the Saginaw River and Saginaw Bay, Ojibwe for "at the outlet"	187,688	801 sq mi (2,075 km^{2})	State map highlighting Saginaw County
St. Clair County	147	Port Huron	May 8, 1821	From part of Macomb County.	Named for either Arthur St. Clair, first governor of the Northwest Territory, or Saint Clair on whose feast day Lake St. Clair was discovered	160,486	722 sq mi (1,870 km^{2})	State map highlighting St. Clair County
St. Joseph County	149	Centreville	October 29, 1829	From unorganized territory.	The St. Joseph River, which flows through the county.	60,968	501 sq mi (1,298 km^{2})	State map highlighting St. Joseph County
Sanilac County	151	Sandusky	September 10, 1822	From part of St. Clair County.	Sanilac, a Wyandotte chief	40,038	963 sq mi (2,494 km^{2})	State map highlighting Sanilac County
Schoolcraft County	153	Manistique	March 9, 1843	From parts of Chippewa County and Mackinac County.	Henry Rowe Schoolcraft, (1793-1864): American geographer and Superintendent of Indian Affairs in Michigan	8,187	1,172 sq mi (3,035 km^{2})	State map highlighting Schoolcraft County
Shiawassee County	155	Corunna	September 10, 1822	From parts of Oakland County and St. Clair County.	Named for the Shiawassee River, and means 'river that twists about.	67,681	531 sq mi (1,375 km^{2})	State map highlighting Shiawassee County
Tuscola County	157	Caro	April 1, 1840	From part of Sanilac County.	Schoolcraft pseudo-Native American name	52,680	805 sq mi (2,085 km^{2})	State map highlighting Tuscola County
Van Buren County	159	Paw Paw	October 29, 1829	From unorganized territory.	Martin Van Buren (1782-1862): Secretary of State in the Jackson Administration, later Vice President and eighth President of the United States	76,071	608 sq mi (1,575 km^{2})	State map highlighting Van Buren County
Washtenaw County	161	Ann Arbor	September 10, 1822	From parts of Oakland County and Wayne County	From the Native American name for the Grand River, O-wash-ta-nong ("faraway water"), whose headwaters were within the county's bounds.	370,214	706 sq mi (1,829 km^{2})	State map highlighting Washtenaw County
Wayne County	163	Detroit	November 21, 1815	All lands within Michigan Territory that had been ceded by Native Americans through the 1807 Treaty of Detroit.	"Mad" Anthony Wayne, (1745-1796): United States Army general and statesman	1,769,038	612 sq mi (1,585 km^{2})	State map highlighting Wayne County
Wexford County	165	Cadillac	April 1, 1840	From part of Mackinac County. Was named Kautawaubet County until 1843.	County Wexford, Ireland	34,445	565 sq mi (1,463 km^{2})	State map highlighting Wexford County

== Racial / Ethnic Profile of counties in Michigan (2020 Census) ==
Racial / Ethnic Profile of counties in Michigan (2020 Census)
Following is a table of counties in Michigan by race/ethnicity. The majority racial/ethnic group is coded per the key below.

Majority minority with no dominant group
Majority White
Majority Black
Majority Hispanic
Majority Asian
Majority Native American

Racial and ethnic composition of counties in Michigan (2020 Census) (NH = Non-Hispanic) Note: the US Census treats Hispanic/Latino as an ethnic category. This table excludes Latinos from the racial categories and assigns them to a separate category. Hispanics/Latinos may be of any race.
County	Location of County	Total Population	White alone (NH)	%	Black or African American alone (NH)	%	Native American or Alaska Native alone (NH)	%	Asian alone (NH)	%	Pacific Islander alone (NH)	%	Other race alone (NH)	%	Mixed race or Multiracial (NH)	%	Hispanic or Latino (any race)	%
Alcona		10,167	9,593	94.35%	23	0.23%	57	0.56%	14	0.14%	1	0.01%	27	0.27%	330	3.25%	122	1.20%
Alger		8,842	7,323	82.82%	585	6.62%	327	3.70%	22	0.25%	1	0.01%	25	0.28%	444	5.02%	115	1.30%
Allegan		120,502	103,088	85.55%	1,446	1.20%	561	0.47%	839	0.70%	20	0.02%	433	0.36%	4,726	3.92%	9,389	7.79%
Alpena		28,907	27,006	93.42%	99	0.34%	120	0.42%	112	0.39%	12	0.04%	67	0.23%	1,074	3.72%	417	1.44%
Antrim		23,431	21,743	92.80%	39	0.17%	192	0.82%	70	0.30%	18	0.08%	55	0.23%	855	3.65%	459	1.96%
Arenac		15,002	13,919	92.78%	35	0.23%	126	0.84%	38	0.25%	1	0.01%	25	0.17%	588	3.92%	270	1.80%
Baraga		8,158	5,753	70.52%	598	7.33%	1,083	13.28%	15	0.18%	3	0.04%	22	0.27%	582	7.13%	102	1.25%
Barry		62,423	56,779	90.96%	295	0.47%	221	0.35%	245	0.39%	15	0.02%	198	0.32%	2,528	4.05%	2,142	3.43%
Bay		103,856	90,811	87.44%	1,598	1.54%	359	0.35%	538	0.52%	0	0.00%	257	0.25%	4,363	4.20%	5,930	5.71%
Benzie		17,970	16,597	92.36%	56	0.31%	164	0.91%	71	0.40%	0	0.00%	65	0.36%	626	3.48%	391	2.18%
Berrien		154,316	111,603	72.32%	21,199	13.74%	740	0.48%	3,159	2.05%	109	0.07%	668	0.43%	7,628	4.94%	9,210	5.97%
Branch		44,862	39,025	86.99%	1,124	2.51%	132	0.29%	266	0.59%	10	0.02%	135	0.30%	1,587	3.54%	2,583	5.76%
Calhoun		134,310	100,385	74.74%	14,275	10.63%	683	0.51%	3,715	2.77%	29	0.02%	553	0.41%	7,244	5.39%	7,426	5.53%
Cass		51,589	43,309	83.95%	2,272	4.40%	521	1.01%	316	0.61%	11	0.02%	218	0.42%	2,781	5.39%	2,161	4.19%
Charlevoix		26,054	23,881	91.66%	74	0.28%	367	1.41%	122	0.47%	10	0.04%	114	0.44%	1,061	4.07%	425	1.63%
Cheboygan		25,579	22,872	89.42%	89	0.35%	687	2.69%	85	0.33%	1	0.00%	65	0.25%	1,439	5.63%	341	1.33%
Chippewa		36,785	24,544	66.72%	2,611	7.10%	5,601	15.23%	193	0.52%	12	0.03%	87	0.24%	2,980	8.10%	757	2.06%
Clare		30,856	28,628	92.78%	140	0.45%	181	0.59%	72	0.23%	0	0.00%	88	0.29%	1,126	3.65%	621	2.01%
Clinton		79,128	67,915	85.83%	1,640	2.07%	234	0.30%	1,870	2.36%	23	0.03%	241	0.30%	3,265	4.13%	3,940	4.98%
Crawford		12,988	12,026	92.59%	57	0.44%	83	0.64%	55	0.42%	4	0.03%	29	0.22%	442	3.40%	292	2.25%
Delta		36,903	33,441	90.62%	93	0.25%	818	2.22%	153	0.41%	8	0.02%	82	0.22%	1,765	4.78%	543	1.47%
Dickinson		25,947	24,198	93.26%	61	0.24%	117	0.45%	147	0.57%	4	0.02%	43	0.17%	937	3.61%	440	1.70%
Eaton		109,175	87,200	79.87%	7,463	6.84%	307	0.28%	2,444	2.24%	13	0.01%	346	0.32%	4,875	4.47%	6,527	5.98%
Emmet		34,112	30,359	89.00%	159	0.47%	1,074	3.15%	173	0.51%	22	0.06%	97	0.28%	1,636	4.80%	592	1.74%
Genesee		406,211	283,483	69.79%	79,080	19.47%	1,391	0.34%	4,041	0.99%	116	0.03%	1,390	0.34%	20,451	5.03%	16,259	4.00%
Gladwin		25,386	23,830	93.87%	68	0.27%	95	0.37%	72	0.28%	0	0.00%	45	0.18%	794	3.13%	482	1.90%
Gogebic		14,380	12,981	90.27%	65	0.45%	512	3.56%	35	0.24%	3	0.02%	36	0.25%	526	3.66%	222	1.54%
Grand Traverse		95,238	85,543	89.82%	583	0.61%	878	0.92%	813	0.85%	41	0.04%	289	0.30%	4,081	4.29%	3,010	3.16%
Gratiot		41,761	34,812	83.36%	2,195	5.26%	156	0.37%	161	0.39%	28	0.07%	96	0.23%	1,160	2.78%	3,153	7.55%
Hillsdale		45,746	42,145	92.13%	196	0.43%	143	0.31%	176	0.38%	6	0.01%	137	0.30%	1,771	3.87%	1,172	2.56%
Houghton		37,361	33,854	90.61%	280	0.75%	159	0.43%	855	2.29%	21	0.06%	151	0.40%	1,372	3.67%	669	1.79%
Huron		31,407	29,508	93.95%	77	0.25%	77	0.25%	150	0.48%	5	0.02%	42	0.13%	708	2.25%	840	2.67%
Ingham		284,900	191,551	67.23%	34,446	12.09%	953	0.33%	16,424	5.76%	110	0.04%	1,451	0.51%	15,543	5.46%	24,422	8.57%
Ionia		66,804	57,617	86.25%	3,210	4.81%	246	0.37%	229	0.34%	5	0.01%	121	0.18%	2,012	3.01%	3,364	5.04%
Iosco		25,237	23,244	92.10%	164	0.65%	124	0.49%	153	0.61%	3	0.01%	56	0.22%	883	3.50%	610	2.42%
Iron		11,631	10,823	93.05%	24	0.21%	93	0.80%	41	0.35%	0	0.00%	34	0.29%	410	3.53%	206	1.77%
Isabella		64,394	52,970	82.26%	2,076	3.22%	2,025	3.14%	1,116	1.73%	17	0.03%	182	0.28%	3,002	4.66%	3,006	4.67%
Jackson		160,366	131,097	81.75%	12,385	7.72%	515	0.32%	1,475	0.92%	30	0.02%	473	0.29%	8,207	5.12%	6,184	3.86%
Kalamazoo		261,670	193,428	73.92%	29,686	11.34%	819	0.31%	6,983	2.67%	57	0.02%	1,367	0.52%	14,554	5.56%	14,776	5.65%
Kalkaska		17,939	16,523	92.11%	40	0.22%	139	0.77%	60	0.33%	0	0.00%	59	0.33%	763	4.25%	355	1.98%
Kent		657,974	465,491	70.75%	62,359	9.48%	1,818	0.28%	21,799	3.31%	175	0.03%	2,331	0.35%	28,773	4.37%	75,228	11.43%
Keweenaw		2,046	1,948	95.21%	4	0.20%	1	0.05%	0	0.00%	0	0.00%	5	0.24%	61	2.98%	27	1.32%
Lake		12,096	9,360	77.38%	795	6.57%	65	0.54%	45	0.37%	8	0.07%	24	0.20%	604	4.99%	1,195	9.88%
Lapeer		88,619	78,871	89.00%	966	1.09%	277	0.31%	396	0.45%	8	0.01%	250	0.28%	3,607	4.07%	4,244	4.79%
Leelanau		22,301	19,781	88.70%	64	0.29%	577	2.59%	106	0.48%	4	0.02%	58	0.26%	794	3.56%	917	4.11%
Lenawee		99,423	83,126	83.61%	2,437	2.45%	342	0.34%	476	0.48%	8	0.01%	299	0.30%	4,241	4.27%	8,494	8.54%
Livingston		193,866	176,756	91.17%	1,117	0.58%	512	0.26%	1,626	0.84%	113	0.06%	567	0.29%	7,672	3.96%	5,503	2.84%
Luce		5,339	4,514	84.55%	12	0.22%	365	6.84%	2	0.04%	0	0.00%	10	0.19%	362	6.78%	74	1.39%
Mackinac		10,834	8,015	73.98%	56	0.52%	1,682	15.53%	28	0.26%	0	0.00%	34	0.31%	852	7.86%	167	1.54%
Macomb		881,217	665,241	75.49%	108,532	12.32%	1,766	0.20%	38,244	4.34%	193	0.02%	2,939	0.33%	38,088	4.32%	26,214	2.97%
Manistee		25,032	21,836	87.23%	606	2.42%	487	1.95%	79	0.32%	2	0.01%	57	0.23%	1,135	4.53%	830	3.32%
Marquette		66,017	59,038	89.43%	790	1.20%	1,011	1.53%	400	0.61%	17	0.03%	178	0.27%	3,239	4.91%	1,344	2.04%
Mason		29,052	25,944	89.30%	167	0.57%	219	0.75%	154	0.53%	8	0.03%	81	0.28%	1,189	4.09%	1,290	4.44%
Mecosta		39,714	35,521	89.44%	772	1.94%	190	0.48%	312	0.79%	14	0.04%	118	0.30%	1,761	4.43%	1,026	2.58%
Menominee		23,502	21,325	90.74%	98	0.42%	727	3.09%	94	0.40%	5	0.02%	33	0.14%	734	3.12%	486	2.07%
Midland		83,494	73,825	88.42%	942	1.13%	293	0.35%	1,710	2.05%	83	0.10%	320	0.38%	3,662	4.39%	2,659	3.18%
Missaukee		15,052	13,940	92.61%	33	0.22%	48	0.32%	43	0.29%	1	0.01%	23	0.15%	465	3.09%	499	3.32%
Monroe		154,809	135,369	87.44%	4,036	2.61%	414	0.27%	952	0.61%	24	0.02%	490	0.32%	7,293	4.71%	6,231	4.02%
Montcalm		66,614	58,880	88.39%	2,118	3.18%	212	0.32%	225	0.34%	23	0.03%	136	0.20%	2,323	3.49%	2,697	4.05%
Montmorency		9,153	8,551	93.42%	12	0.13%	68	0.74%	24	0.26%	0	0.00%	34	0.37%	339	3.70%	125	1.37%
Muskegon		175,824	130,141	74.02%	23,622	13.44%	1,106	0.63%	1,073	0.61%	31	0.02%	537	0.31%	9,031	5.14%	10,283	5.85%
Newaygo		49,978	43,915	87.87%	424	0.85%	256	0.51%	189	0.38%	14	0.03%	126	0.25%	2,085	4.17%	2,969	5.94%
Oakland		1,274,395	879,137	68.98%	168,797	13.25%	2,236	0.18%	105,665	8.29%	304	0.02%	5,230	0.41%	52,188	4.10%	60,838	4.77%
Oceana		26,659	21,191	79.49%	123	0.46%	195	0.73%	69	0.26%	4	0.02%	79	0.30%	890	3.34%	4,108	15.41%
Ogemaw		20,770	19,268	92.77%	59	0.28%	108	0.52%	57	0.27%	8	0.04%	58	0.28%	775	3.73%	437	2.10%
Ontonagon		5,816	5,434	93.43%	8	0.14%	60	1.03%	20	0.34%	2	0.03%	10	0.17%	214	3.68%	68	1.17%
Osceola		22,891	21,188	92.56%	155	0.68%	142	0.62%	34	0.15%	6	0.03%	61	0.27%	905	3.95%	400	1.75%
Oscoda		8,219	7,684	93.49%	8	0.10%	34	0.41%	5	0.06%	0	0.00%	11	0.13%	323	3.93%	154	1.87%
Otsego		25,091	23,156	92.29%	100	0.40%	151	0.60%	91	0.36%	0	0.00%	60	0.24%	1,087	4.33%	446	1.78%
Ottawa		296,200	241,520	81.54%	5,071	1.71%	726	0.25%	7,895	2.67%	95	0.03%	851	0.29%	10,660	3.60%	29,382	9.92%
Presque Isle		12,982	12,282	94.61%	28	0.22%	67	0.52%	52	0.40%	0	0.00%	26	0.20%	373	2.87%	154	1.19%
Roscommon		23,459	21,883	93.28%	60	0.26%	94	0.40%	76	0.32%	10	0.04%	47	0.20%	855	3.64%	434	1.85%
Saginaw		190,124	128,722	67.70%	33,548	17.65%	462	0.24%	2,373	1.25%	85	0.04%	769	0.40%	7,261	3.82%	16,904	8.89%
St. Clair		160,383	142,396	88.78%	3,773	2.35%	561	0.35%	809	0.50%	13	0.01%	443	0.28%	6,883	4.29%	5,505	3.43%
St. Joseph		60,939	50,674	83.16%	1,341	2.20%	151	0.25%	414	0.68%	9	0.01%	174	0.29%	2,749	4.51%	5,427	8.91%
Sanilac		40,611	37,209	91.62%	151	0.37%	112	0.28%	84	0.21%	2	0.00%	98	0.24%	1,281	3.15%	1,674	4.12%
Schoolcraft		8,047	6,727	83.60%	10	0.12%	699	8.69%	15	0.19%	1	0.01%	5	0.06%	494	6.14%	96	1.19%
Shiawassee		68,094	62,239	91.40%	319	0.47%	223	0.33%	288	0.42%	19	0.03%	188	0.28%	2,794	4.10%	2,024	2.97%
Tuscola		53,323	48,611	91.16%	402	0.75%	174	0.33%	155	0.29%	12	0.02%	132	0.25%	2,029	3.81%	1,808	3.39%
Van Buren		75,587	59,400	78.58%	2,348	3.11%	552	0.73%	384	0.51%	27	0.04%	285	0.38%	3,625	4.80%	8,966	11.86%
Washtenaw		372,258	252,220	67.75%	42,125	11.32%	715	0.19%	33,517	9.00%	183	0.05%	2,051	0.55%	20,716	5.56%	20,731	5.57%
Wayne		1,793,561	857,132	47.79%	669,277	37.32%	4,265	0.24%	64,604	3.60%	322	0.02%	7,974	0.44%	72,338	4.03%	117,649	6.56%
Wexford		33,673	30,783	91.42%	187	0.56%	163	0.48%	186	0.55%	1	0.00%	112	0.33%	1,451	4.31%	790	2.35%

== Defunct counties and county precursors ==
This listing includes only counties or county precursors created by the Territory of Michigan or the State of Michigan. It excludes counties that existed in the Territory of Michigan or the modern boundaries of the State of Michigan but were created by any other entity (another state, a territorial government, the federal government, etc.) before the creation of the Territory of Michigan.

1. Brown County, formed on December 3, 1818, from unorganized territory when Michigan Territory was expanded to include area west of Lake Michigan upon formation of the state of Illinois. Transferred to Wisconsin Territory on July 3, 1836, and continues as Brown County, Wisconsin.
2. Crawford County, formed on December 3, 1818, from unorganized territory when Michigan Territory was expanded to include area west of Lake Michigan upon formation of the state of Illinois. Transferred to Wisconsin Territory on July 3, 1836, and continues as Crawford County, Wisconsin.
3. Des Moines County, formed on October 1, 1834, from unorganized territory. Transferred to Wisconsin Territory on July 3, 1836, and continues as Des Moines County, Iowa.
4. Detroit District, formed on July 3, 1805, as a county precursor by Territorial Governor Lewis Cass to carry out the Territory's judicial and administrative functions. Superseded by counties on October 2, 1818, as proclaimed by William Woodbridge, Secretary of Michigan Territory.
5. Dubuque County, formed on October 1, 1834, from unorganized territory. Transferred to Wisconsin Territory on July 3, 1836, and continues as Dubuque County, Iowa.
6. Erie District, formed on July 3, 1805, as a county precursor by Territorial Governor William Hull to carry out the Territory's judicial and administrative functions. Included parts of modern-day Indiana and the Toledo Strip. Although the Erie District was officially superseded by counties by proclamation of Michigan Territorial Secretary William Woodbridge on October 2, 1818, the area of the district had actually been lost to the State of Indiana when it was created on December 11, 1816.
7. Huron District formed on July 3, 1805, as a county precursor by Territorial Governor William Hull to carry out the Territory's judicial and administrative functions. Superseded by counties on October 2, 1818, as proclaimed by William Woodbridge, Secretary of Michigan Territory.
8. Iowa County, formed on January 1, 1830, from part of Crawford County. Transferred to Wisconsin Territory on July 3, 1836, and continues as Iowa County, Wisconsin.
9. Isle Royale County, formed on March 4, 1875, from part of Keweenaw County. County became officially unorganized on March 13, 1885, and was attached to Houghton County, for judicial and administrative purposes. Michigan Legislature officially dissolved Isle Royale County and returned it to Keweenaw County on April 9, 1897.
10. Keskkauko County, formed on April 1, 1840, from part of Mackinac County. Renamed Charlevoix County, on March 8, 1843. Annexed to Emmet County, on January 29, 1853, and eliminated as a county. Reformed as Charlevoix County from Emmet, Antrim, and Otsego, Counties on April 2, 1869, albeit with boundaries that differed somewhat from the 1840–1853 iteration of Keskkauko–Charlevoix County.
11. Manitou County, formed on February 12, 1855, from parts of Emmet County and Leelanau County. On March 16, 1861, Manitou County was attached to Mackinac County for meetings of the District Court, but all other County functions were unchanged. Four years later, on March 10, 1865, the District Court attachment was changed to Leelanau County instead of Mackinac. Another four years later, on March 24, 1869, the District Court attachment to Leelanau County was terminated. The entire Manitou County government was dissolved on April 4, 1895, and the county was abolished. It was absorbed by Charlevoix County, and Leelanau County.
12. Michilimackinac District formed on July 3, 1805, as a county precursor by Territorial Governor William Hull to carry out the Territory's judicial and administrative functions. Incorporated into Wayne County, on October 18, 1816.
13. Milwaukee County, formed on September 6, 1834, from part of Brown County. Transferred to Wisconsin Territory on July 3, 1836, and continues as Milwaukee County, Wisconsin.
14. Omeena County, formed on April 1, 1840, from part of Mackinac County. Annexed to Grand Traverse County, on February 3, 1853.
15. Wyandot County, formed on April 1, 1840, from part of Mackinac County. Annexed to Cheboygan County, on January 29, 1853.
16. Washington County, formed in 1867 from Marquette County, but declared unconstitutional.

== See also ==
- Cabinet counties
- List of former United States counties
- List of county subdivisions in Michigan
