= Alanson, Michigan =

Village in the United States

- Village
- Village of Alanson
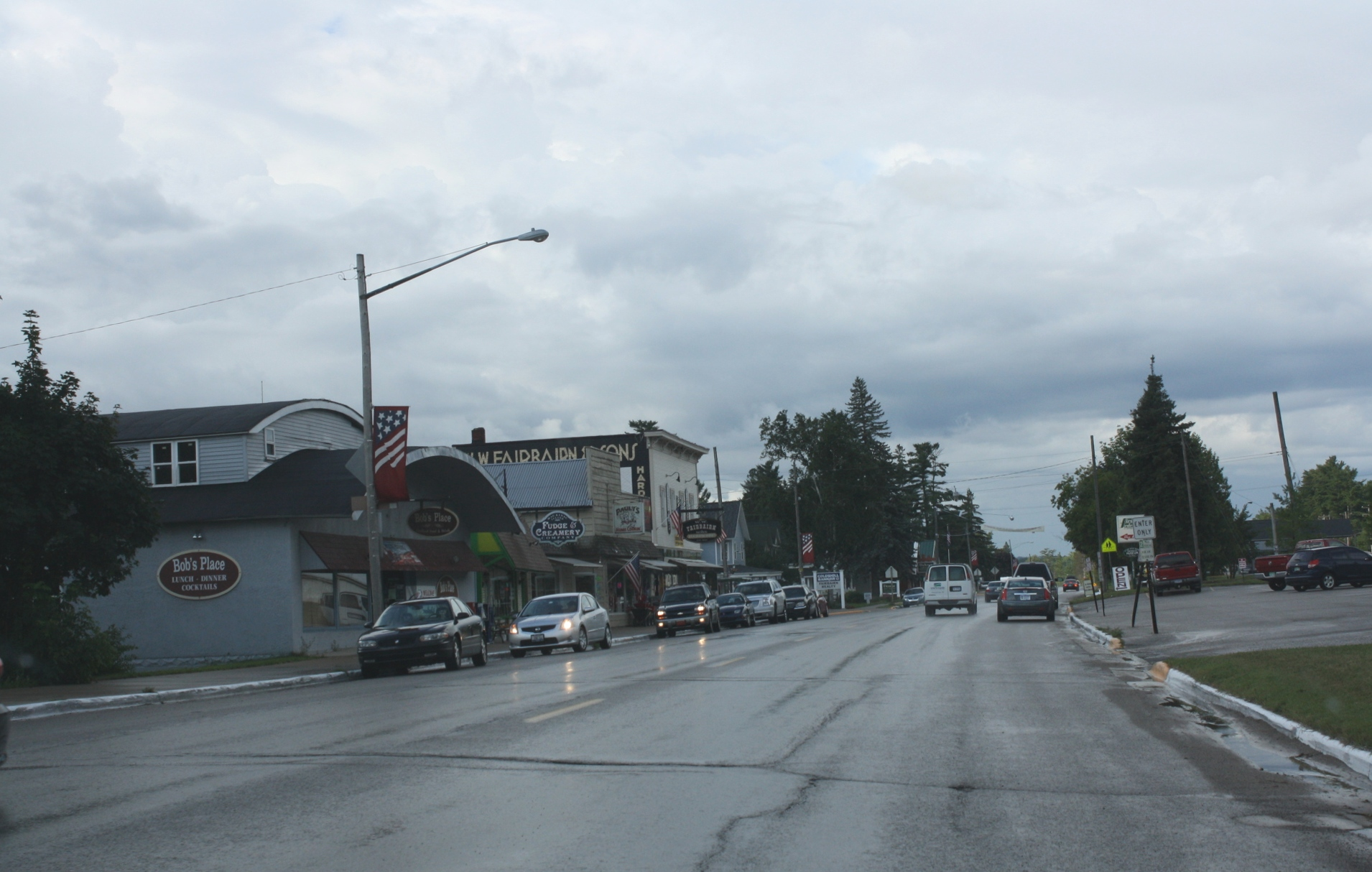
- Downtown Alanson along U.S. Route 31

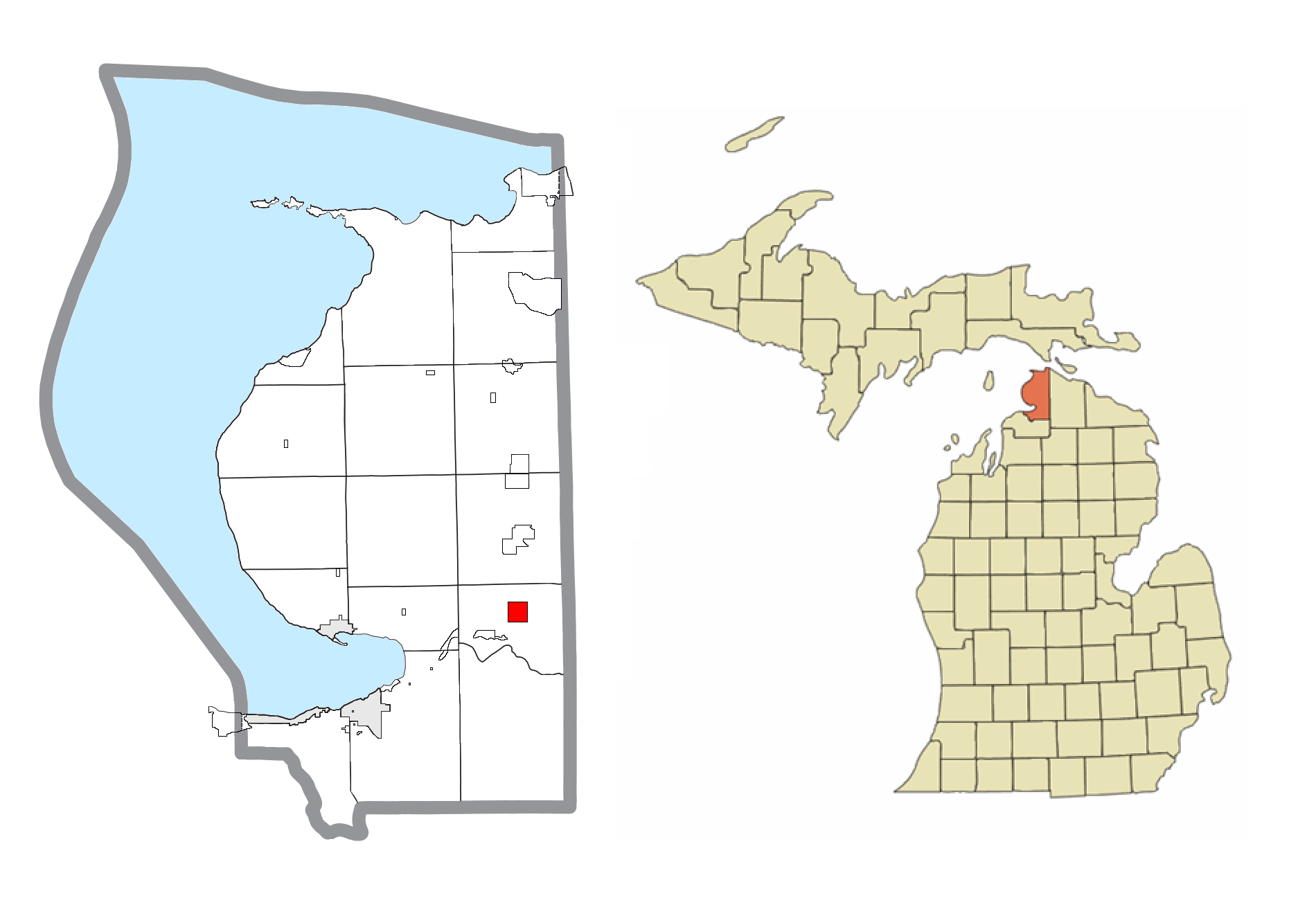
- Location within Emmet County

- Location within the state of Michigan
- Coordinates: 45°26′33″N 84°47′14″W
- Country: United States
- State: Michigan
- County: Emmet
- Township: Littlefield
- Settled: 1875
- Incorporated: 1905

Government
  - Type: Village council
  - President: Jamie Breithaupt
  - Clerk: Jennifer Murphy/ Deputy Clerk Craig Wilson

Area
  - Total: 1.02 sq mi (2.63 km^{2})
  - Land: 0.98 sq mi (2.55 km^{2})
  - Water: 0.031 sq mi (0.08 km^{2})
- Elevation: 600 ft (180 m)

Population (2020)
  - Total: 778
  - Density: 790/sq mi (304.9/km^{2})
- Time zone: UTC-5 (Eastern (EST))
  - Summer (DST): UTC-4 (EDT)
- ZIP code(s): 49706
- Area code: 231
- FIPS code: 26-00860
- GNIS feature ID: 2397921
- Website: Official website

Alanson (/əˈlæn.sən/ ə-LAN-sən) is a village in Emmet County in the U.S. state of Michigan. The population was 778 at the 2020 census.

Alanson is in Littlefield Township on U.S. Highway 31 at the junction with M-68. Petoskey is about 12 miles (19 km) southwest on US 31 and Mackinaw City and the Mackinac Bridge are about 25 miles (40 km) north. Interstate 75 is about 11 miles (18 km) to the east on M-68 at Indian River.

Alanson was first settled in 1875. The Alanson post office opened with the name Hinman on January 17, 1877, and changed to Alanson on June 22, 1882.

== Geography ==
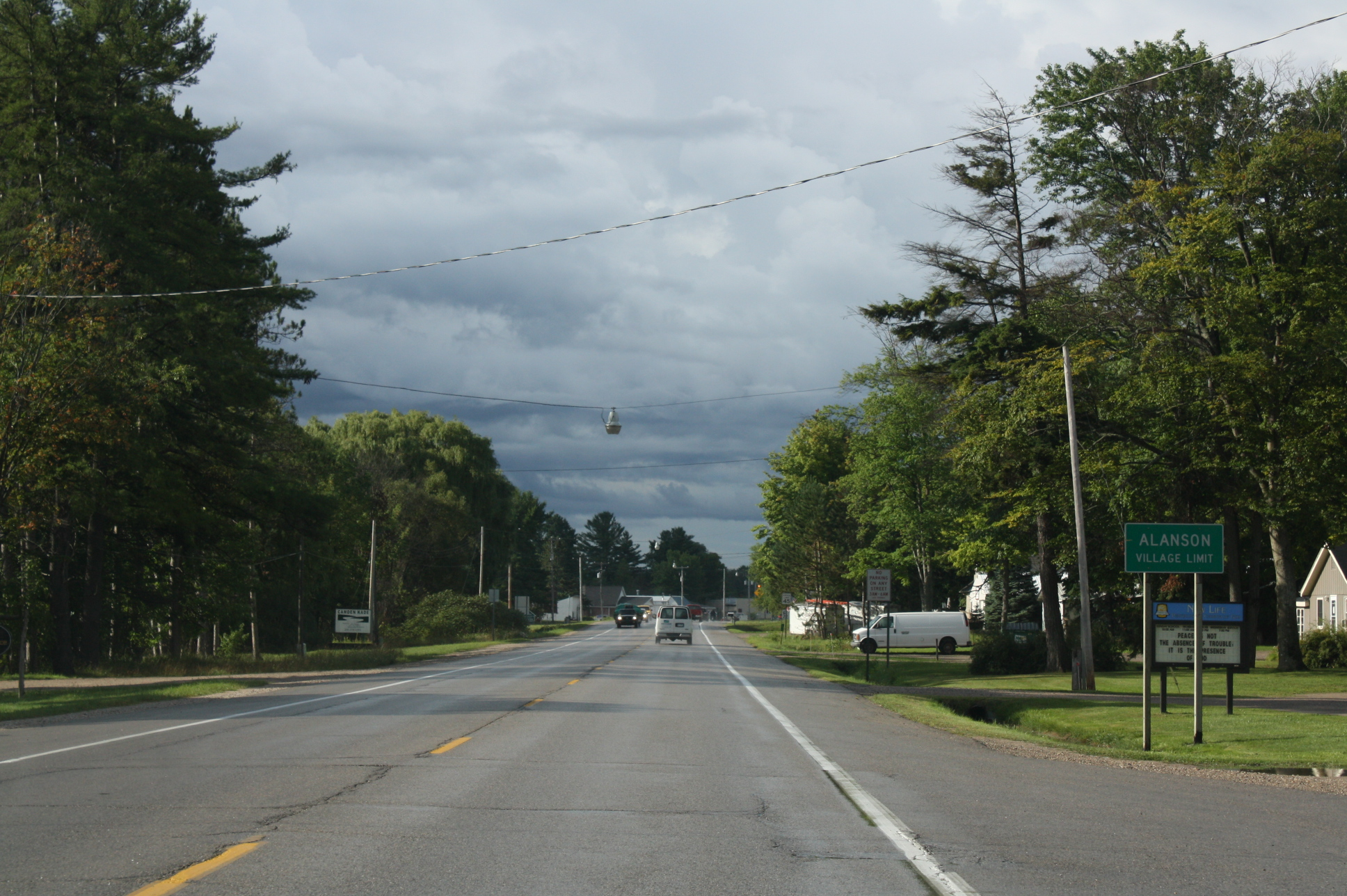
Sign on US 31

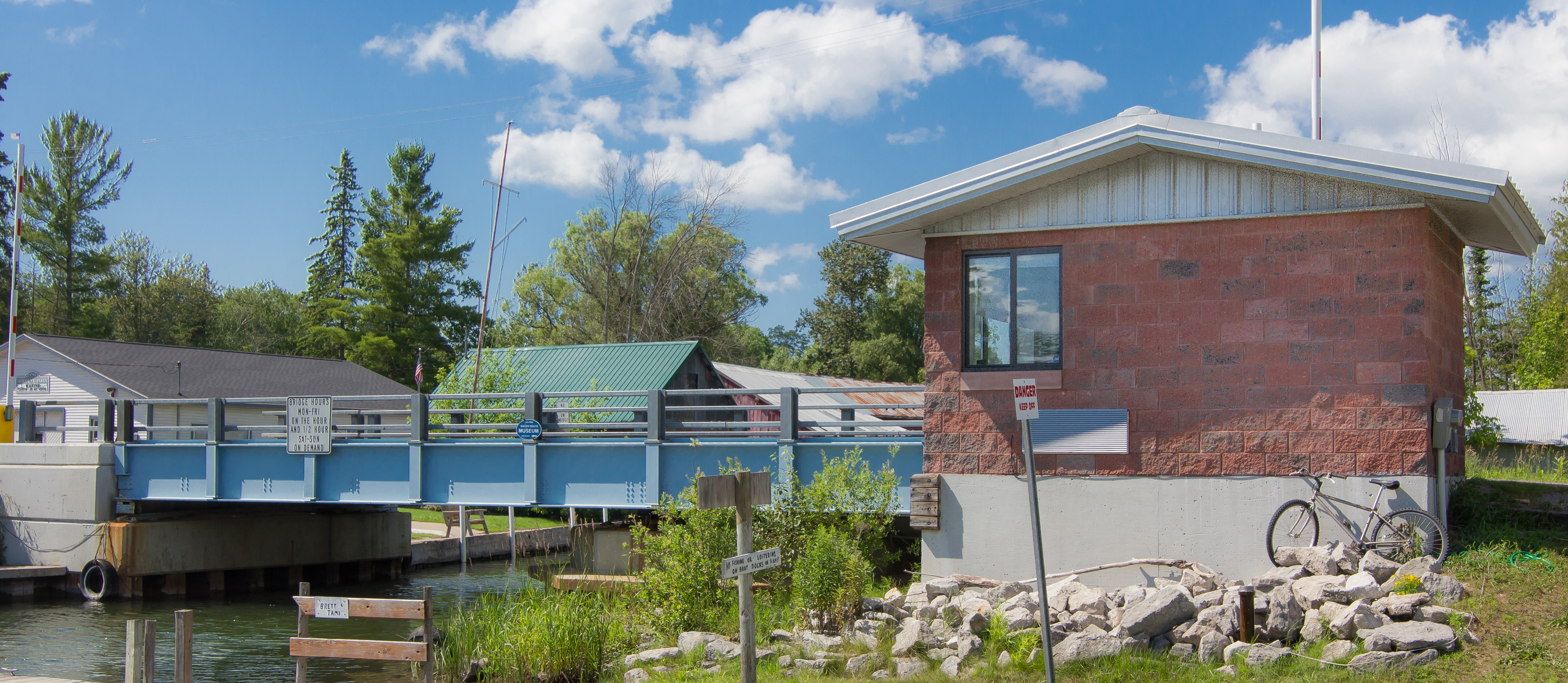
Alanson Swing Bridge

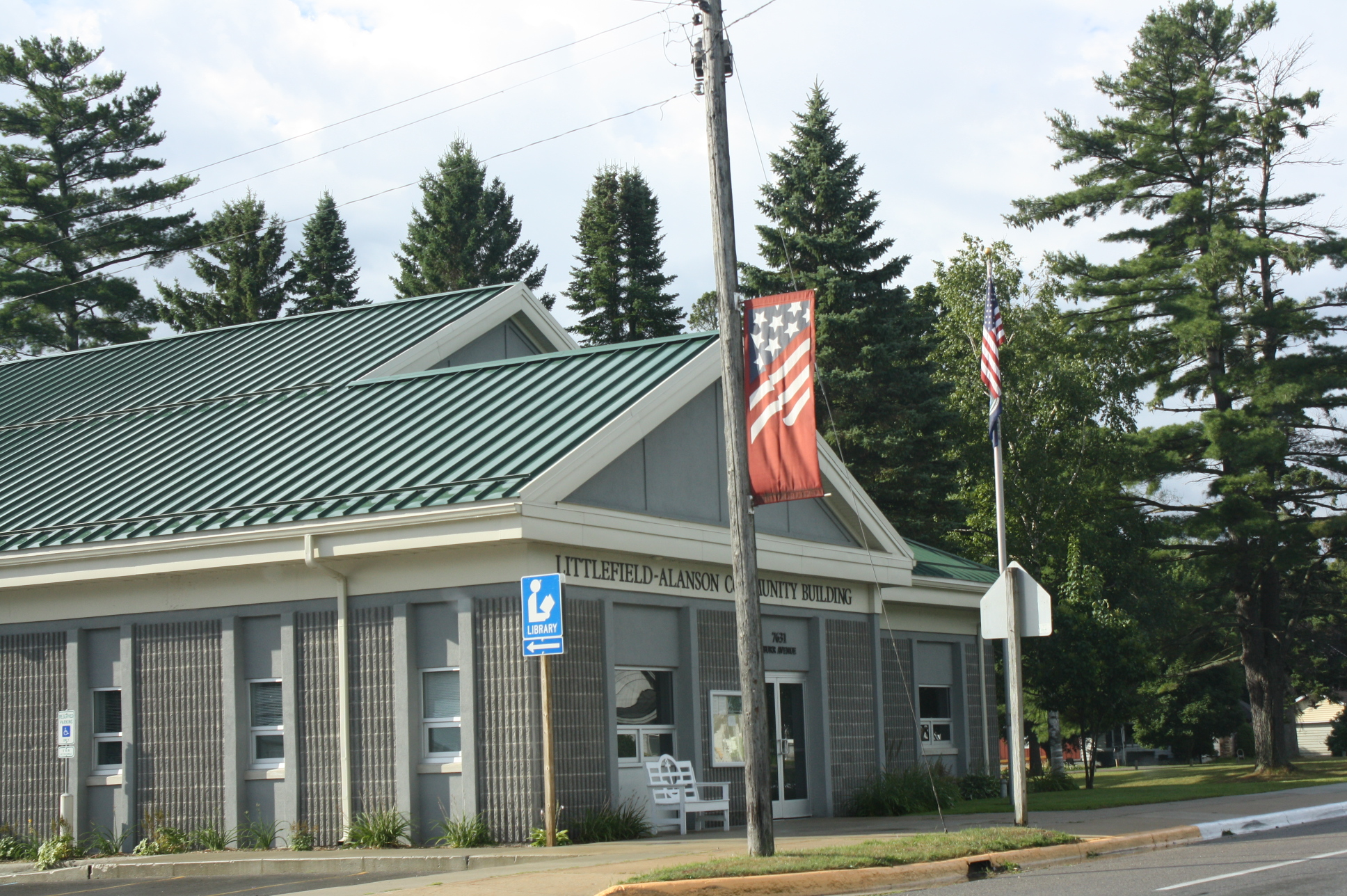
Littlefield Alanson Community Building

According to the United States Census Bureau, the village has a total area of 1.02 square miles (2.64 km^{2}), of which 0.99 square miles (2.56 km^{2}) is land and 0.03 square miles (0.08 km^{2}) is water.

Located on the Crooked River, Alanson is part of the Inland Water Route, which includes Crooked, Burt and Mullett Lakes, and the Crooked, Indian and Cheboygan Rivers.

== Attractions ==
The Inland Water Route Historical Society Museum is located in Alanson. The Alanson Swing Bridge across the Inland Water Route is billed as America's shortest swing bridge, although it is probably not.

Alanson has a hillside garden located adjacent to the former Grand Rapids and Indiana Railroad depot, and a community center including a library.

== Demographics ==
Historical population
Census	Pop.	Note	%±
1910	473		—
1920	332		−29.8%
1930	287		−13.6%
1940	330		15.0%
1950	319		−3.3%
1960	290		−9.1%
1970	362		24.8%
1980	508		40.3%
1990	677		33.3%
2000	785		16.0%
2010	738		−6.0%
2020	778		5.4%
U.S. Decennial Census

=== 2010 census ===
As of the census of 2010, there were 738 people, 307 households, and 209 families residing in the village. The population density was 745.5 inhabitants per square mile (287.8/km^{2}). There were 429 housing units at an average density of 433.3 per square mile (167.3/km^{2}). The racial makeup of the village was 92.4% White, 5.0% Native American, 0.3% Asian, and 2.3% from two or more races. Hispanic or Latino of any race were 1.4% of the population.

There were 307 households, of which 33.9% had children under the age of 18 living with them, 48.2% were married couples living together, 14.3% had a female householder with no husband present, 5.5% had a male householder with no wife present, and 31.9% were non-families. 27.0% of all households were made up of individuals, and 6.6% had someone living alone who was 65 years of age or older. The average household size was 2.40 and the average family size was 2.83.

The median age in the village was 36.3 years. 25.1% of residents were under the age of 18; 8.5% were between the ages of 18 and 24; 28.7% were from 25 to 44; 26.1% were from 45 to 64; and 11.7% were 65 years of age or older. The gender makeup of the village was 50.4% male and 49.6% female.

=== 2000 census ===
As of the census of 2000, there were 785 people, 323 households, and 207 families residing in the village. The population density was 807.8 inhabitants per square mile (311.9/km^{2}). There were 407 housing units at an average density of 418.8 per square mile (161.7/km^{2}). The racial makeup of the village was 89.55% White, 0.89% African American, 5.61% Native American, 0.13% Asian, 0.51% from other races, and 3.31% from two or more races. Hispanic or Latino of any race were 1.02% of the population.

There were 323 households, out of which 31.6% had children under the age of 18 living with them, 48.3% were married couples living together, 11.8% had a female householder with no husband present, and 35.9% were non-families. 29.4% of all households were made up of individuals, and 10.2% had someone living alone who was 65 years of age or older. The average household size was 2.43 and the average family size was 2.93.

In the village, the population was spread out, with 26.9% under the age of 18, 10.2% from 18 to 24, 33.1% from 25 to 44, 19.0% from 45 to 64, and 10.8% who were 65 years of age or older. The median age was 33 years. For every 100 females, there were 95.8 males. For every 100 females age 18 and over, there were 93.3 males.

The median income for a household in the village was $33,125, and the median income for a family was $38,333. Males had a median income of $23,929 versus $20,568 for females. The per capita income for the village was $20,703. About 4.0% of families and 8.1% of the population were below the poverty line, including 5.7% of those under age 18 and 15.0% of those age 65 or over.

== Education ==
- Alanson Public Schools

== In popular culture ==
The town and the Crooked River are mentioned in a song title on the Sufjan Stevens album Michigan.

== Sources ==
- Romig, Walter (October 1, 1986) [1973]. Michigan Place Names: The History of the Founding and the Naming of More Than Five Thousand Past and Present Michigan Communities (paperback). Great Lakes Books Series. Detroit, Michigan: Wayne State University Press. ISBN 9780814318386.
