= M-68 (Michigan highway) =

State highway in Michigan, United States

M-68
- M-68 highlighted in red

Route information
- Maintained by MDOT
- Length: 53.390 mi (85.923 km)
- Existed: 1936–present

Major junctions
- West end: US 31 at Alanson
- I-75 near Indian River; M-33 near Afton to Onaway; M-211 in Onaway; US 23 in Rogers City
- East end: Bus. US 23 at Rogers City

Location
- Country: United States
- State: Michigan
- Counties: Emmet, Cheboygan, Presque Isle

Highway system
- Michigan State Trunkline Highway System; Interstate; US; State; Byways
← M-67	→ I-69

M-68 is an east–west state trunkline highway located in the northern part of the Lower Peninsula of the US state of Michigan. The western terminus of the highway begins four miles (6.4 km) east of the Little Traverse Bay of Lake Michigan and ends a few blocks from Lake Huron in Rogers City. M-68 skirts just south of Indian River and Burt Lake.

The first incarnation of M-68 existed in the Upper Peninsula before being absorbed into M-35. The current designation was created in 1936. A segment of highway once used by US Highway 23 (US 23) was incorporated into the trunkline as a discontinuous section in the early 1940s until it was later connected in 1946.

== Route description ==
M-68 starts in the community of Alanson 4 miles (6.4 km) east of Little Traverse Bay in Emmet County. US 31 runs along Burr Avenue parallel to the former Grand Rapids and Indiana Railroad line and depot in town. M-68 starts at an intersection between Chicago Street and Burr Avenue. The trunkline runs southeasterly from this intersection and on a bridge over the Crooked River. After leaving town, the highway curves to run due east through hilly terrain. After crossing the Cheboygan County line, the roadway meets the community of Burt Lake. It curves southeasterly along the shoreline of the lake of the same name. The roadway rounds the south end of Burt Lake and approaches the community of Indian River. South of Burt Lake State Park, the trunkline meets Straits Highway, the former routing of US 27 through Indian River. M-68 turns north along Straits Highway through downtown and then turns east toward Interstate 75 (I-75). It is along this section of M-68 that the roadway crosses the Sturgeon River. The Michigan Department of Transportation (MDOT) measured the highest annual average daily traffic (AADT) figures for M-68 along the section of highway west of Indian River. AADT is a measure of the average number of vehicles using a segment of roadway on any given day of the year, and for 2007, MDOT measured it at 9,200 vehicles daily.

After crossing I-75 at exit 310, M-68 heads southeasterly, parallel to the Crumley Creek, out of town. The roadway continues through hilly terrain and crosses the Pigeon River on the route to Afton. M-68 merges with M-33 east of Afton. M-33 curves from the north toward the east. There is a small connector in this intersection to allow southbound M-33 traffic to turn west along M-68 instead of merging into the combined eastbound M-33/M-68 traffic. The two highways continue together in a concurrency through the wooded, hilly terrain to the unincorporated community of Tower, where they cross the Black River. It is east of this river crossing where the highway meets the southern end of F-05, a County-Designated Highway that runs along Black River Road.

M-33/M-68 cross into Presque Isle County just west of Onaway. M-68 turns northwest along Washington Avenue, and M-33 turns south along Michigan Street. M-68 turns east on State Street through downtown and runs out of town to cross the Rainy River in rural Presque Isle County. East of the Ocqueoc River crossing, M-68 turns north along Millersburg Road. The highway later curves back to the east near Ocqueoc Falls Highway, home of a bridge that carried the highway before 1954. M-68 continues to follow Hutchinson Road eastward over the Little Ocqueoc River and on to the Rogers City area. This section of highway had the lowest AADT levels in 2007 at 1,400 vehicles daily. The highway turns northeasterly after intersecting Airport Highway on the outskirts of town. Renamed as Erie Street, M-68 meets US 23 southwest of downtown. The highway continues along Erie Street until meeting Bus. US 23, which runs along Third Street. This intersection marks the end of M-68, four blocks from Lake Huron, 53.390 miles (85.923 km) from its start in Alanson.

== History ==
=== Previous incarnation ===
The first highway to bear the M-68 designation was located in the western Upper Peninsula. It ran north from Rockland to Ontonagon and then westerly toward Silver City in 1919. This roadway was redesignated by 1927 as a segment of M-35.

=== Current incarnation ===
M-68 was designated along a segment of its current roadway in 1936. The roadway connecting Alanson and Indian River was given the M-68 designation, while US 23 was routed between Rogers City and Afton. When US 23 was moved to its current lakeshore routing between Rogers City and Cheboygan in 1940, M-33 was extended westerly from Onaway to Afton and north to Cheboygan over the former US 23 roadway. The Afton–Onaway segment of M-33 and the remainder of the former US 23 east of Onaway was designated as a second segment of M-68 as well. The gap between these two segments was eliminated by July 1946.

Two realignments were made to the highways routing. The first bypassed a bridge over the Ocqueoc River in Presque Isle County in 1954. This 50-foot (15 m) bridge was built in 1920 at a cost of $8,849 (equivalent to $104,653 in 2024) in the filled spandrel arch style. A second change in the routing between 1961 and 1962 moved the trunkline to a more direct connection between Indian River and Afton. This change also bypassed the last remaining gravel section of the highway.

== Major intersections ==
County	Location	mi	km	Destinations	Notes
Emmet	Alanson	0.000	0.000	US 31 / LMCT – Petoskey, Mackinaw City	
Cheboygan	Indian River	11.282	18.157	I-75 – Mackinac Bridge, Saginaw	Exit 310 on I-75
Cheboygan	Koehler–Walker township line	19.572	31.498	M-33 north – Cheboygan	Western end of M-33 concurrency
Cheboygan	Forest Township	28.646	46.101	F-05 north (Black River Road) – Cheboygan	Southern terminus of F-05
Presque Isle	Onaway	30.303	48.768	M-33 south – Atlanta	Eastern end of M-33 concurrency
Presque Isle	Onaway	30.693	49.396	M-211 north – Onaway State Park	Southern terminus of M-211
Presque Isle	Rogers City	52.687	84.792	US 23 / LHCT – Cheboygan, Alpena	
Presque Isle	Rogers City	53.390	85.923	Bus. US 23 / LHCT – Cheboygan, Alpena	Roadway continues northeasterly as Erie Street
1.000 mi = 1.609 km; 1.000 km = 0.621 mi: Concurrency terminus
