= Sturgeon River =

Sturgeon River may refer to:

== In Canada ==
- Sturgeon River (Alberta), which flows into the North Saskatchewan River northeast of Fort Saskatchewan
- Sturgeon River (Manitoba) in northern Manitoba and Ontario
- In Ontario:
  - Sturgeon River in northern Kenora District in the Hayes River watershed, same as Sturgeon River (Manitoba).
  - Sturgeon River (Kenora District), in western Kenora District in the Nelson River watershed, tributary of the English River
  - Sturgeon River (Marchington River tributary) in eastern Kenora and north-western Thunder Bay Districts, tributary of Marchington River in the Nelson River watershed
  - Sturgeon River (Black Bay Peninsula) on the Black Bay Peninsula in Lake Superior, Thunder Bay District
  - Sturgeon River (Lake Nipissing), in the Nipissing, Sudbury and Timiskaming Districts, which flows to Lake Nipissing
  - Sturgeon River (Simcoe County), in Simcoe County, which flows to Georgian Bay on Lake Huron
- Sturgeon River (Prince Edward Island) in Kings County, Prince Edward Island
- Sturgeon River (Saskatchewan), which flows into the North Saskatchewan River just west of Prince Albert, Saskatchewan
- Sturgeon-Weir River, a river in Saskatchewan

== In the United States ==
- Sturgeon River (Michigan), four rivers in Michigan
- Sturgeon River (Big Fork River), located in Koochiching County, Minnesota
- Sturgeon River (Little Fork River), located in St. Louis County, Minnesota
- Sturgeon River, Minnesota, an unorganized territory in St. Louis County, Minnesota

== See also ==
- Black Sturgeon River (Kenora District), Ontario, Canada
- Black Sturgeon River (Thunder Bay District), Ontario
- Little Sturgeon River, Michigan
- Turgeon River (disambiguation)
