= Maple River =

Maple River may refer to:

== Rivers ==
- Maple River (Iowa), a tributary of the Little Sioux River in the U.S. state of Iowa
- Maple River (Michigan), any of three rivers in the U.S. state of Michigan
  - Maple River (Burt Lake)
  - Maple River (Grand River tributary)
  - Maple River (Muskegon River)
- Maple River (Minnesota), a tributary of the Le Sueur River in the U.S. state of Minnesota
- Maple River (North Dakota), a tributary of the Red River of the North in the U.S. state of North Dakota
- Maple River (North Dakota–South Dakota), a tributary of the Elm River in the U.S. states of North Dakota and South Dakota

== Places ==
- Maple River, Iowa, an unincorporated community
- Maple River State Game Area, a wildlife area in the U.S. state of Michigan
- Maple River Township (disambiguation)

== See also ==
- Maple (disambiguation)
