= Little Sturgeon River =

Location
- Country: United States

Physical characteristics
- Source
  - location: Michigan
- Mouth
  - location: 45°24′19″N 84°36′32″W

The Little Sturgeon River is a 12.3-mile-long (19.8 km) river in Cheboygan County, Michigan, in the United States. It is a tributary of the Indian River, part of the Mullett Lake/Cheboygan River system flowing to Lake Huron.

The Little Sturgeon rises at the outlet of Corey Lake east of Wolverine. It flows north and joins the Indian River at the town of Indian River, east of the outlet of Burt Lake.

== See also ==
- List of rivers of Michigan
