= Sturgeon River (Cheboygan County, Michigan) =

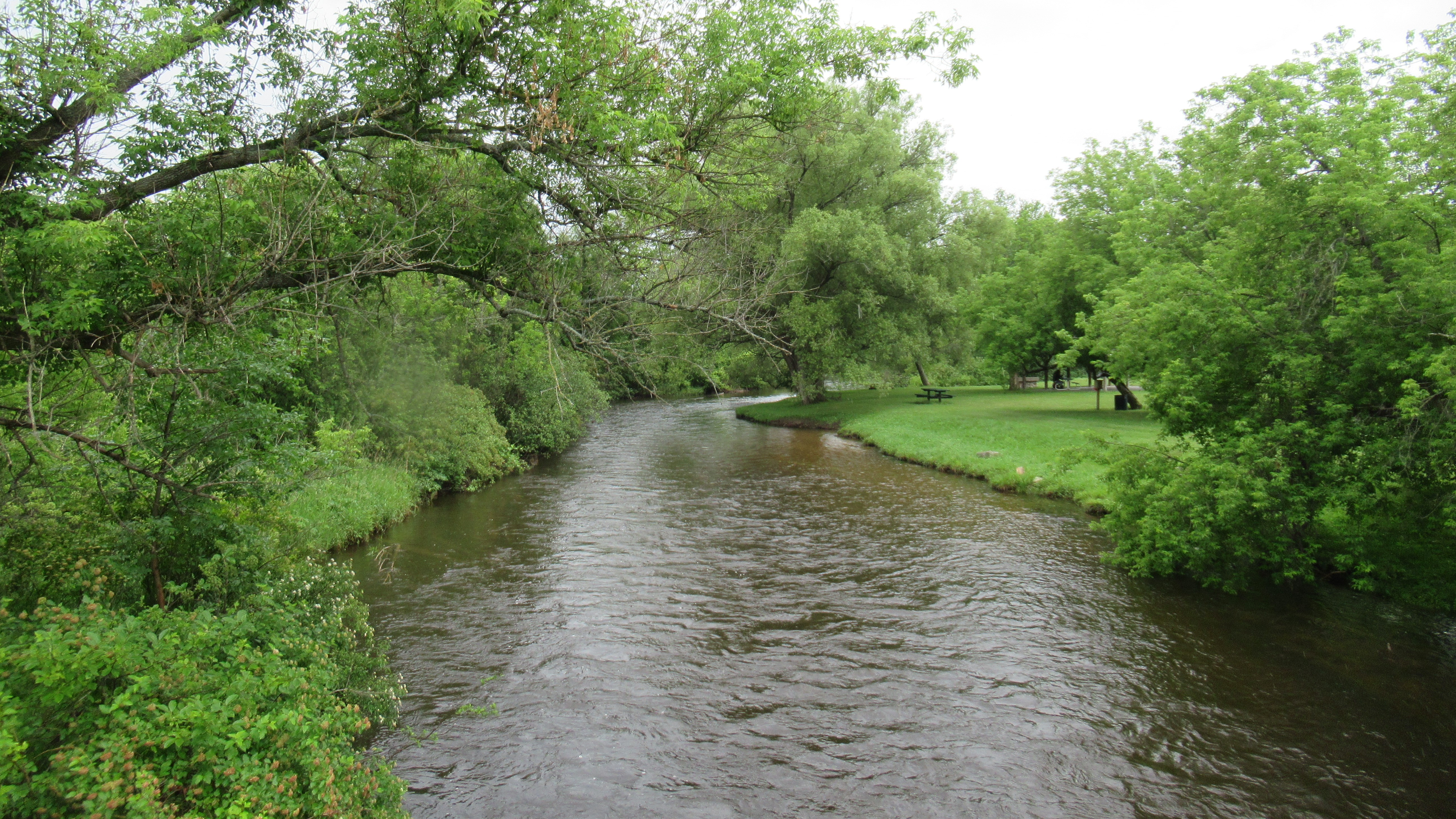
- Sturgeon River flowing through Wolverine

- Location within the state of Michigan

Location
- Country: United States

Physical characteristics
- Source
  - location: Livingston Township, Otsego County, Michigan
- Mouth
  - location: Burt Lake in Tuscarora Township, Cheboygan County, Michigan
  - coordinates: 45°24′24″N 84°37′39″W
  - elevation: 597 feet (182 m)

Sturgeon River is a 40.8-mile-long (65.7 km) river in the U.S. state of Michigan, flowing mostly northward through Otsego and Cheboygan counties.

The Sturgeon River rises in Livingston Township, Otsego County, near the city of Gaylord at 45°01′49″N 84°38′18″W. It flows into Burt Lake in the community of Indian River. A channel formerly flowed into the Indian River at 45°24′47″N 84°36′36″W, but the main course of the river now empties directly into Burt Lake.

The West Branch Sturgeon River rises in southeast Charlevoix County at 45°07′49″N 84°47′55″W and flows 17.5 miles (28.2 km) to the main stream at 45°16′19″N 84°36′03″W in Wolverine.

The Little Sturgeon River rises in Cheboygan County northeast of Wolverine at 45°17′55″N 84°33′37″W and flows north on a course generally parallel to the Sturgeon River. The mouth of the Little Sturgeon River is at 45°24′19″N 84°36′32″W on the former channel of the Sturgeon River that flows into the Indian River.

With an average descent of 14 feet per mile, the Sturgeon River is the fastest river in Michigan's Lower Peninsula. The water is crystal-clear since it begins as a spring-fed stream. The average depth is 3–4 feet, however, there are deeper pools that can reach 5–8 feet, usually around the outside of bends.

== Tributaries ==
From the mouth:

- (left) Little Sturgeon River
  - (left) Crumley Creek
    - (left) Twin Lakes Creek
      - Roberts Lake
        - Cochran Lake
    - Goose Lake
  - (right) Johnson Creek
  - Corey Lake
- (left) Beebe Creek
- (right) West Branch Sturgeon River
  - (right) Silver Lake
  - (left) Allen Creek
  - (right) Marl Creek
  - (right) Reardon Lake
  - (left) Woodin Lake
    - Berry Lake
      - Fitzek Lake
  - Hoffman Lake
    - Kidney Lake
- (right) Mud Creek
  - Mud Lake
- (left) Bradley Creek
  - Lance Lake
    - Wildwood Lake
- (right) Stewart Creek
- (right) Club Stream
- (left) Pickerel Creek
  - Pickerel Lake
- (right) Mossback Creek
