= Sturgeon River (Michigan) =

Sturgeon River may refer to any of the following streams in the U.S. state of Michigan:

- Sturgeon River (Delta County, Michigan) — The Sturgeon River rises as outflow of Sixteenmile Lake in Alger County at 46°17′35″N 86°46′00″W and flows primarily southward into the Big Bay de Noc at 45°50′17″N 86°40′01″W.
  - The West Branch Sturgeon River rises at 46°09′56″N 86°43′46″W and flows southeast into the main stream at 46°08′43″N 86°41′14″W.
  - A post office named Sturgeon River opened near the mouth of the river on July 23, 1891. The name was changed to St. Jacques on June 22, 1904. It closed on November 30, 1913, re-opened April 11, 1919, and was discontinued on July 31, 1955.
- Sturgeon River (Houghton County, Michigan) — The Sturgeon River rises in Baraga County at 46°35′12″N 88°16′05″W near Nestoria and empties into Portage Lake in the Keweenaw Waterway at 47°02′06″N 88°29′18″W.
  - The West Branch Sturgeon River rises in western Houghton County at 46°39′58″N 88°49′20″W and enters the main branch at 46°48′40″N 88°37′57″W at Pelkie.

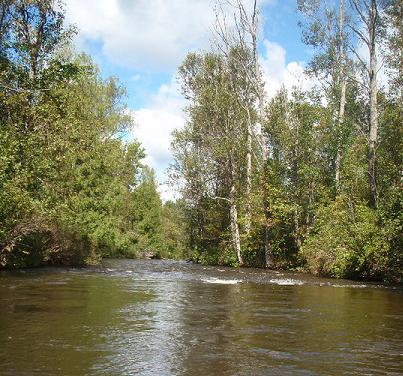
The Sturgeon River (Cheboygan County)

- Sturgeon River (Cheboygan County, Michigan) — The Sturgeon River rises in Otsego County near Gaylord and flows into Burt Lake in the community of Indian River. A channel formerly flowed into the Indian River at 45°24′47″N 84°36′36″W, though the main course of the river now empties directly into Burt Lake.
  - The West Branch Sturgeon River rises in southeast Charlevoix County at 45°07′49″N 84°47′55″W and flows into the main stream at 45°16′19″N 84°36′03″W in Wolverine.
  - The Little Sturgeon River rises in Cheboygan County northeast of Wolverine at 45°17′55″N 84°33′37″W and flows north on a course generally parallel to the Sturgeon River. The mouth of the Little Sturgeon River is at 45°24′19″N 84°36′32″W on the former channel of the Sturgeon River that into the Indian River.
- Sturgeon River (Dickinson County, Michigan) — The Sturgeon River rises from the confluence of the East and West branches at 45°55′19″N 87°47′46″W and empties into the Menominee River at 45°45′03″N 87°52′02″W near Norway.
  - The East Branch Sturgeon River rises at 46°06′08″N 87°58′08″W in central Dickinson County.
  - The West Branch Sturgeon River rises in west central Dickinson County at 46°04′52″N 88°04′43″W.
    - The North Branch Sturgeon River rises at 46°06′26″N 88°02′31″W also in west central Dickinson County and flows into the West Branch at 46°03′31″N 88°00′00″W.
