= Maple River (Michigan) =

The Maple River is the name of three rivers in the U.S. state of Michigan:

- Maple River (Burt Lake), rises in Pleasant View Township, Emmet County, and flows into Burt Lake in Cheboygan County
- Maple River (Grand River), rises in Shiawassee Township, Shiawassee County and flows through Clinton and Gratiot Counties before emptying into the Grand River in Ionia County
- Maple River (Muskegon River), a short river branch off the Muskegon River in Newaygo and Muskegon counties

== See also ==
- Little Maple River in Clinton County
- Maple River Township, Michigan in Emmet County
