= Turgeon River (disambiguation) =

Turgeon River (French: Rivière Turgeon) may refer to:

- Turgeon River (Harricana River), a tributary of the Harricana River, Quebec, Canada
- Turgeon River (rivière des Hurons), a river in Stoneham-et-Tewkesbury, Quebec, Canada

== See also ==
- Turgeon (disambiguation)
- Sturgeon River (disambiguation)
