= Burt Lake State Park =

Park in Michigan, USA

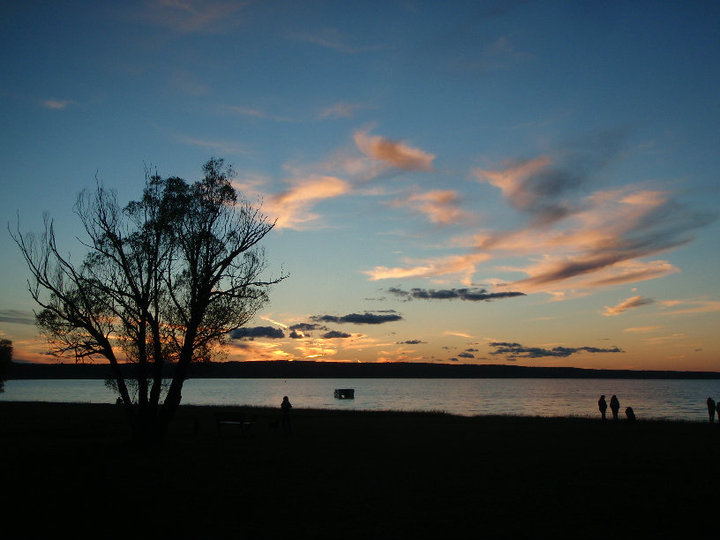

- Location within Michigan Location within the United States
- Interactive map of Burt Lake State Park
- Location: Burt Township, Cheboygan County, Michigan, United States
- Nearest town: Indian River, Michigan
- Coordinates: 45°23′46″N 84°38′04″W
- Area: 125 acres (51 ha)
- Elevation: 594 feet (181 m)
- Established: 1920
- Administrator: Michigan Department of Natural Resources
- Designation: Michigan state park
- Website: Official website

Burt Lake State Park is a public recreation area covering approximately 125 acres (51 ha) on the south shore of Burt Lake at Indian River in Cheboygan County, Michigan. The state park features 2,000 feet (610 m) of sandy shoreline, swimming and boating access to the Inland Lakes Waterway, fishing on the Sturgeon River and Burt Lake, and camping facilities.

== History ==
The park site was first purchased in 1920, with additional parcels acquired through 1939. It was among 13 parks established in 1920 following the creation of the Michigan State Parks Commission a year earlier.
