= Lynchville =

Lynchville may refer to:

- Lynchville, California, former name of San Ramon, California
- Lynchville, New York, an early name for Rome, New York
- Lynchville, Pennsylvania, a location near Pennsylvania State Game Lands Number 25
- Lynchville, Texas, a former small town that is now part of Northeast El Paso, Texas

== See also ==
- Lynchburg (disambiguation)
