= Douglas Lake (Michigan) =

Douglas Lake, Michigan may refer to:

- Douglas Lake (Cheboygan County, Michigan)
- Douglas Lake (Otsego County, Michigan), Otsego County, Michigan
