= John Mullett =

American surveyor (1786–1862)

John Mullett (1786–1862) was a prominent surveyor based in Detroit, Michigan in the early 19th century.

Under the Public Land Survey System, he was surveyor-general for the Northwest Territories and as such, assisted or led "in many of the government's original surveys of Michigan, Wisconsin, Illinois and Indiana," and especially in Michigan.

== Early life ==
Mullett was born to a large family in Halifax, Vermont on July 11, 1786. In 1807, the family moved to Genesee County, New York and dabbled in farming and the craft of tailoring. Mullett served as an officer in the War of 1812, but only saw action in the Battle of Buffalo. Mullett came to Detroit from Buffalo, New York in 1818, and moved from tailoring to mathematics and surveying.

== Notable accomplishments ==
- In 1821, Lewis Cass appointed him surveyor of Michigan.
- In 1822, he surveyed the route from Pontiac, Michigan to Saginaw, Michigan.
- In 1822, Edward Tiffin appointed him United States Deputy Surveyor, and he was engaged in surveying public lands until 1849.
- In 1824/25 surveys of lower Michigan, the survey team he was leading had a small incident with Native Americans over the marking of trees the natives were using for making maple syrup. This "battle" became the origin of the name of Battle Creek, Michigan.
- Mullett surveyed the plank road between Detroit and Grand Rapids
- In 1825, Mullett was among the first white settlers in Climax, Michigan
- In 1828, Mullett published a survey of private property claims on Mackinac Island.
- In 1829-1830 Mullett surveyed Southwest Michigan including the area around Niles, Michigan.
- Following his 1830 "Plan of Detroit" survey, he had two roads in Detroit named after him: Mullett Street (1835) and Catherine Street (1835).
- Improving on Hervey Coke Parke's 1827 survey, Mullett surveyed the final route through the swamp between Detroit and Fort Gratiot in 1831.
- From 1831 to 1834 he surveyed in Wisconsin. His efforts to survey the Fox River and Wisconsin River in Wisconsin were ultimately driven out of Wisconsin by the Black Hawk War.
- Along with surveyors William Austin Burt and Charles W. Cathcart, he surveyed much of Northern Michigan between 1840 and 1843. Mullet became the namesake of Mullett Township, Michigan and Mullett Lake in Northern Michigan, while Burt named Burt Lake after himself.
- In 1843, 1844, and 1845, Mullett was elected Grand Master of Michigan's Masonic Grand Lodge that met in Detroit.

== Later life ==
In 1849, he moved with his family to a farm near Williamston in Ingham County. He had a large family, and his family papers are in the University of Michigan Library. Mullett's Son in Law Frank Hall died in the 1860 PS Lady Elgin disaster.
