= Lynchburg =

Lynchburg is a toponym that may refer to:

- Lynchburg, California
- Lynchburg, Mississippi
- Lynchburg, Missouri
- Lynchburg, North Dakota
- Lynchburg, Ohio (in Clinton and Highland counties)
- Lynchburg, Columbiana County, Ohio
- Lynchburg, South Carolina
- Lynchburg, Tennessee
- Lynchburg, Texas
- Lynchburg, Virginia, the largest US city named Lynchburg
