= Tuscarora Township, Michigan =

- Civil township
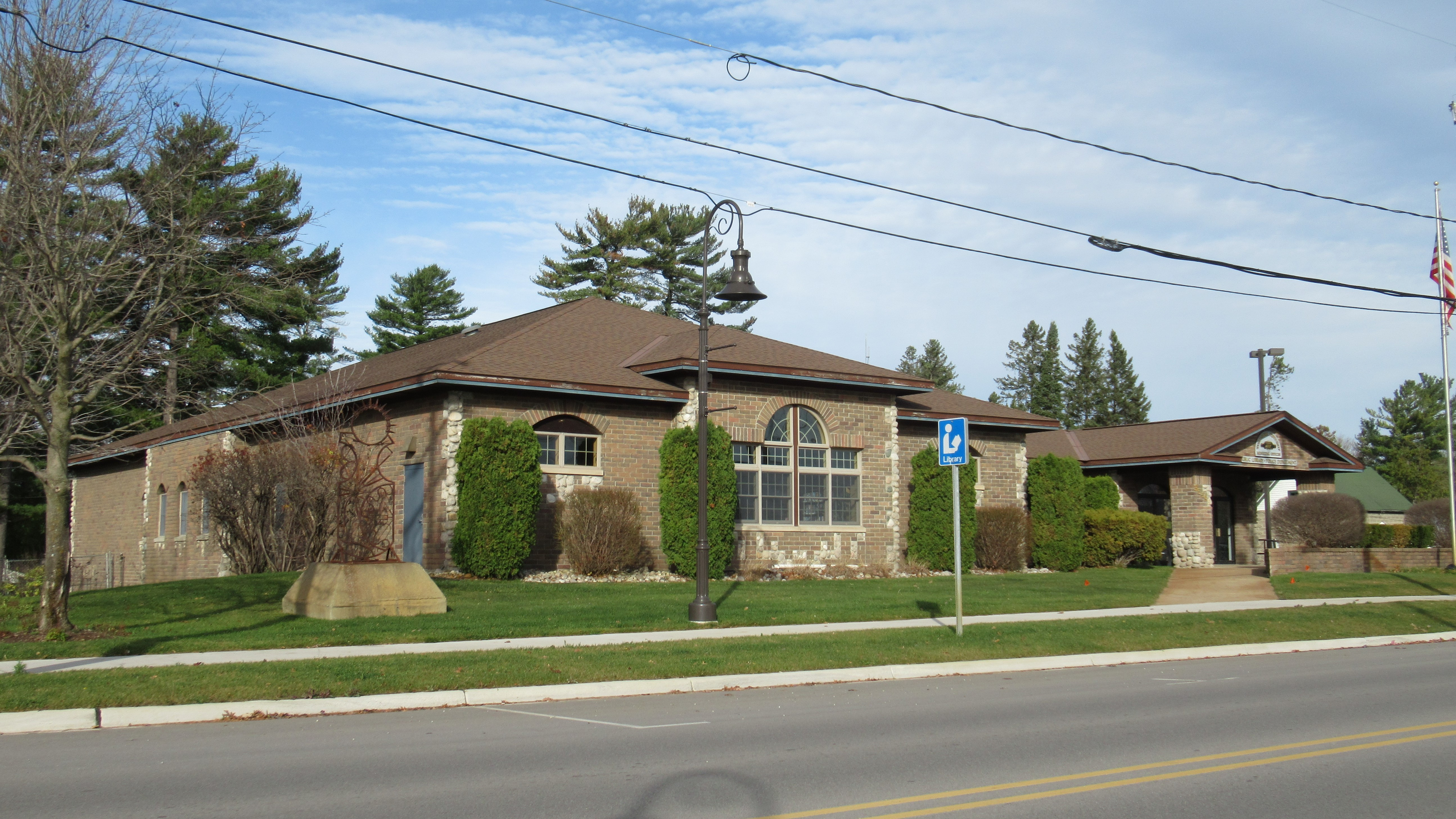
- Tuscarora Township Municipal Offices

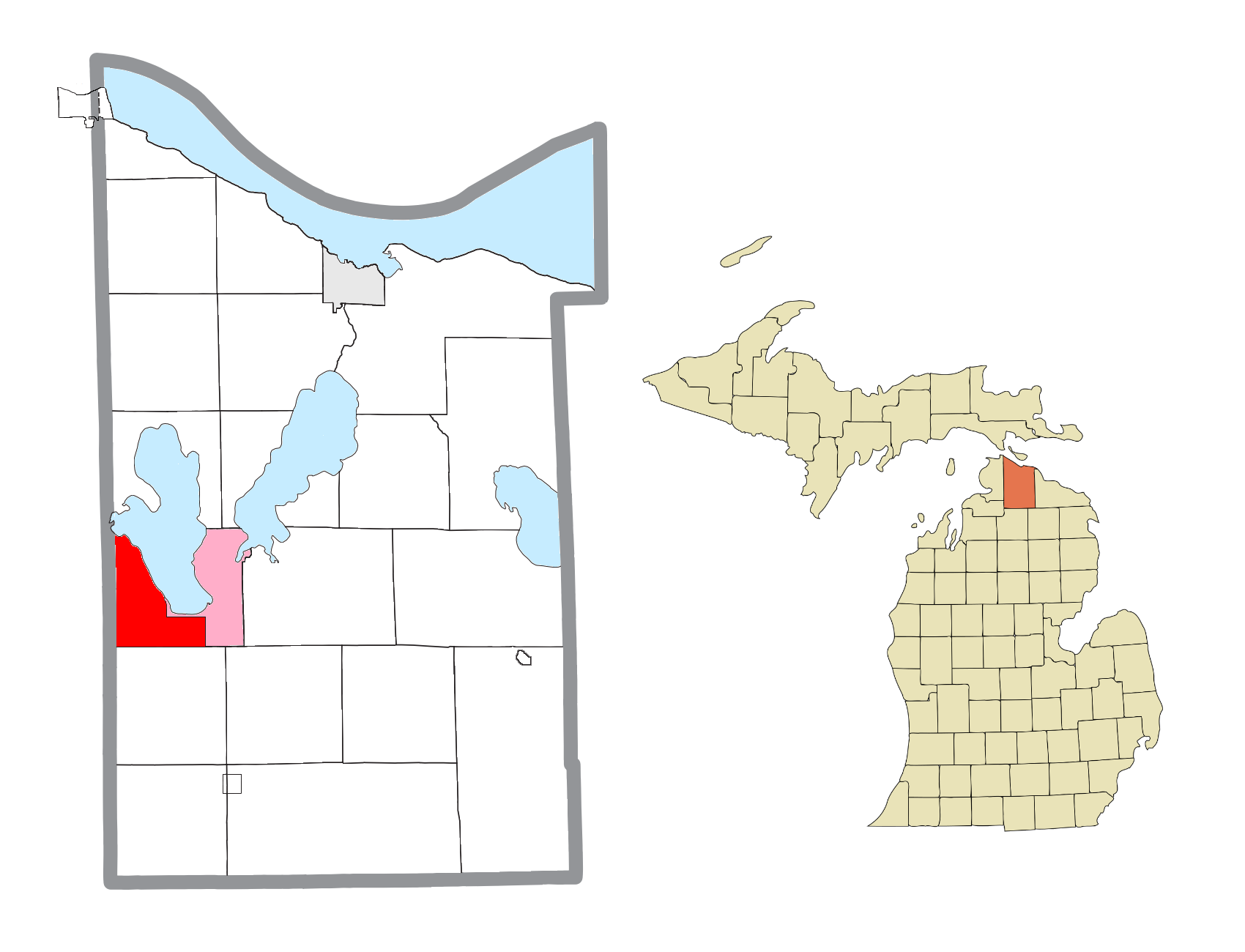
- Location within Cheboygan County (red) and the administered CDP of Indian River (pink)

- Location within the state of Michigan Location within the United States
- Coordinates: 45°24′56″N 84°38′45″W
- Country: United States
- State: Michigan
- County: Cheboygan
- Established: 1882

Government
  - Supervisor: Trudy Maves
  - Clerk: Laura Decker

Area
  - Total: 41.95 sq mi (108.65 km^{2})
  - Land: 29.41 sq mi (76.17 km^{2})
  - Water: 12.54 sq mi (32.48 km^{2})
- Elevation: 594 ft (181 m)

Population (2020)
  - Total: 3,080
  - Density: 104.7/sq mi (40.4/km^{2})
- Time zone: UTC-5 (Eastern (EST))
  - Summer (DST): UTC-4 (EDT)
- ZIP code(s): 49706 (Alanson); 49717 (Burt Lake); 49749 (Indian River)
- Area code: 231
- FIPS code: 26-80880
- GNIS feature ID: 1627179
- Website: Official website

Tuscarora Township is a civil township of Cheboygan County in the U.S. state of Michigan. The population was 3,080 at the 2020 census.

== Communities ==
- Burt Lake is an unincorporated community on the southwest shore of Burt Lake at 45°26′27″N 84°42′40″W. It is on M-68, about 7 miles (11 km) west of I-75 at Indian River and about 16 miles (26 km) east of Petoskey.
- Indian River is an unincorporated community on the southeast end of Burt Lake. It is also a census-designated place that includes the eastern portion of the township.

== Geography ==
According to the United States Census Bureau, the township has a total area of 42.0 square miles (108.7 km^{2}), of which 29.4 square miles (76.2 km^{2}) is land and 12.5 square miles (32.5 km^{2}), or 29.89%, is water.

Burt Lake State Park is located on the south shore of Burt Lake.

== Demographics ==
As of the census of 2000, there were 3,091 people, 1,357 households, and 925 families residing in the township. The population density was 105.0 inhabitants per square mile (40.5/km^{2}). There were 2,162 housing units at an average density of 73.4 per square mile (28.3/km^{2}). The racial makeup of the township was 96.73% White, 0.03% African American, 1.26% Native American, 0.06% Asian, 0.16% from other races, and 1.75% from two or more races. Hispanic or Latino of any race were 1.00% of the population.

There were 1,357 households, out of which 26.2% had children under the age of 18 living with them, 58.4% were married couples living together, 7.6% had a female householder with no husband present, and 31.8% were non-families. 28.1% of all households were made up of individuals, and 13.1% had someone living alone who was 65 years of age or older. The average household size was 2.27 and the average family size was 2.76.

In the township the population was spread out, with 21.6% under the age of 18, 5.2% from 18 to 24, 24.0% from 25 to 44, 28.2% from 45 to 64, and 20.9% who were 65 years of age or older. The median age was 44 years. For every 100 females, there were 95.5 males. For every 100 females age 18 and over, there were 91.5 males.

The median income for a household in the township was $36,091, and the median income for a family was $43,190. Males had a median income of $33,750 versus $22,109 for females. The per capita income for the township was $20,609. About 5.2% of families and 7.5% of the population were below the poverty line, including 8.3% of those under age 18 and 6.5% of those age 65 or over.
