= Maple River Township =

Maple River Township may refer to:

- Maple River Township, Carroll County, Iowa
- Maple River Township, Michigan
- Maple River Township, Cass County, North Dakota, in Cass County, North Dakota
