= University of Michigan Biological Station =

Research station

Coordinates: 45.55969°N 84.67423°W

The University of Michigan Biological Station (UMBS) is a research and teaching facility operated by the University of Michigan. Its campus and primary facilities are located on the south shore of Douglas Lake in Cheboygan County, Michigan. The station consists of 10,000 acres (40 km^{2}) of land near Pellston, Michigan in the northern Lower Peninsula of Michigan and 3,200 acres (13 km^{2}) on Sugar Island in the St. Mary's River near Sault Ste. Marie, in the Upper Peninsula. It is one of the only 28 Biosphere Reserves in the United States.

== Overview ==
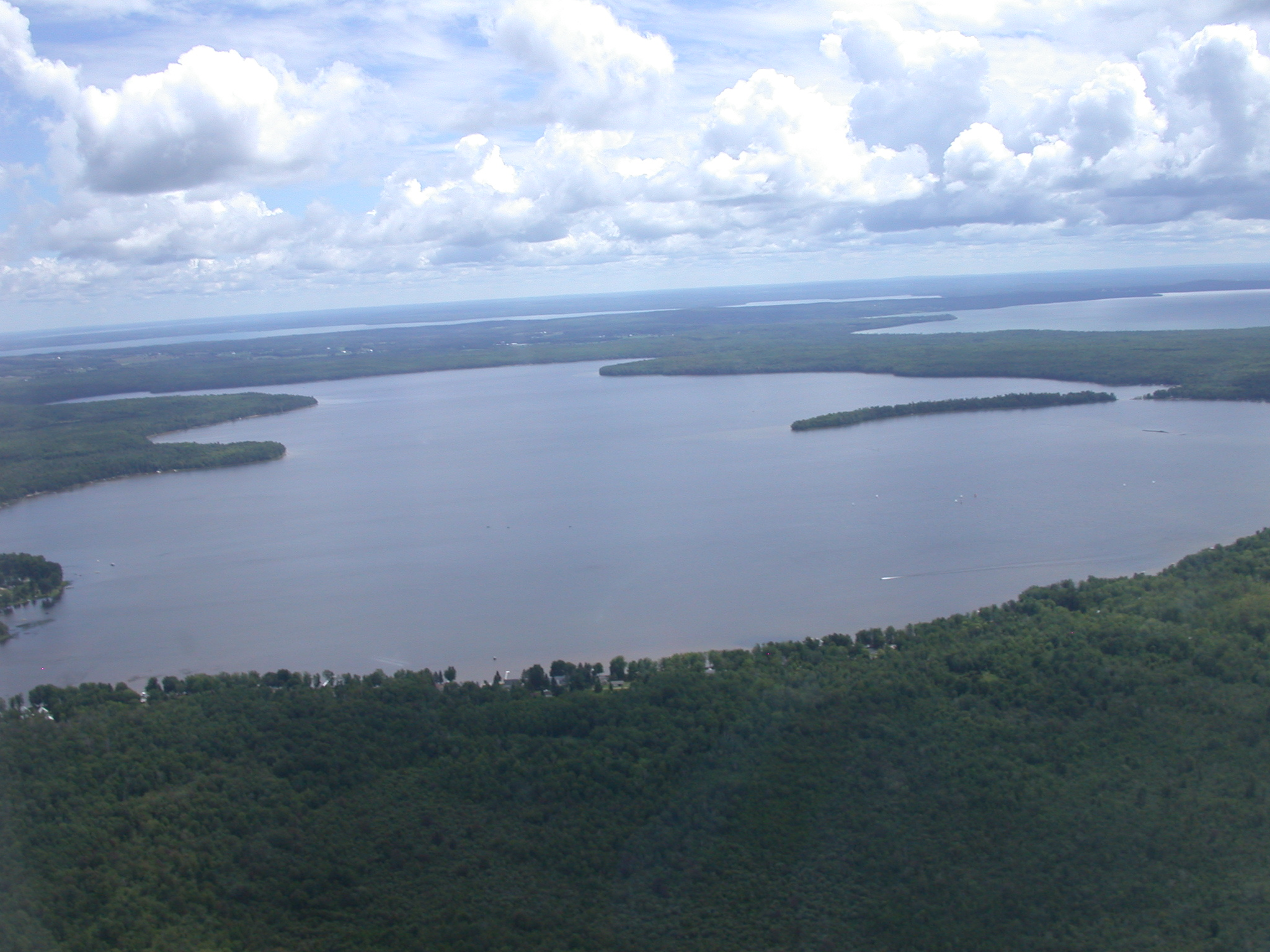
Douglas Lake with UM Biological Station at far end of photograph

Founded in 1909, it has grown to include approximately 150 buildings, including classrooms, student cabins, dormitories, a dining hall, and research facilities. Undergraduate and graduate courses are available in the spring and summer terms. It has a full-time staff of 15.

In the 2000s, UMBS is increasingly focusing on the measurement of climate change. Its field researchers are gauging the impact of global warming and increased levels of atmospheric carbon dioxide on the ecosystem of the upper Great Lakes region, and are using field data to improve the computer models used to forecast further change. Several archaeological digs have been conducted at the station as well.

UMBS field researchers sometimes call the station "bug camp" amongst themselves. This is believed to be due to the number of mosquitoes and other insects present. It is also known as "The Bio-Station".

The UMBS is also home to Michigan's most endangered species and one of the most endangered species in the world: the Hungerford's Crawling Water Beetle. The species lives in only five locations in the world, two of which are in Emmet County. One of these, a two and a half mile stretch downstream from the Douglas Road crossing of the East Branch of the Maple River supports the only stable population of the Hungerford's Crawling Water Beetle, with roughly 1000 specimens. This area, though technically not part of the UMBS is largely within and along the boundary of the University of Michigan Biological Station.

UMBS is also the home of the Great Lakes Piping Plover captive rearing facility. The Great Lakes population of this shorebird is federally endangered, but thanks to extensive conservation efforts the population is on the rise.
