= Cheboygan Crib Light =

Lighthouse in Michigan, United States

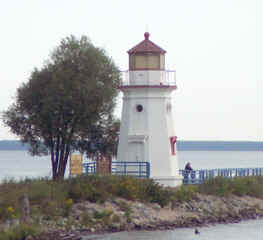
- The light in 2001
- Location: Cheboygan, Michigan
- Coordinates: 45°39.408′N 84°27.900′W

Tower
- Constructed: 1884
- Foundation: oak ring
- Construction: cast iron
- Height: 25 feet (7.6 m)
- Shape: Octagonal and frustum of a cone
- Markings: White tower with red lantern and trim

Light
- First lit: 1884
- Deactivated: 1984
- Focal height: 35 feet (11 m)
- Lens: Fourth-order Fresnel lens
- Range: 10 nautical miles (19 km; 12 mi)
- Characteristic: Fl Red, 4 seconds

The Cheboygan Crib Light is a light that marks the west pier head of the mouth of the Cheboygan River into Lake Huron. The pier head, in the center of the municipality of Cheboygan, is located at the north or lake end of Huron Street, and is one of the centerpieces of Cheboygan's Gordon Turner Park.

== History ==
=== 1884-1920: manned light ===
The Crib Light is called a "light" rather than a "lighthouse" because it does not contain a structure in which a keeper lived. The Light was originally built in Lake Huron in 1884 on a "crib", an artificial-island landfill, more than 2,000 feet (610 m) from the Cheboygan shore. It is assumed that the keeper lived in Cheboygan; this would have required him to boat daily to the crib, despite weather conditions, to maintain the kerosene-fired light. This was hazardous duty, and in due course davits were installed on the Crib Light; this enabled a boat making dock at the crib to be raised, more easily unloaded, and be protected from the waves.

In 1901 this station was painted white to increase its visibility as a daymark. Two years later, in 1903, the existing wooden structure was torn down to a depth of 12 inches (300 mm) into the water and a new sturdier concrete steel structure was erected. Iron railings were also installed to aid with safety.

In 1906, the rebuilt light was severely damaged when a schooner hit it. A fog bell was then installed to help prevent such collisions and the railing was replaced. In 1911 an automated fog bell was installed, sounding a characteristic single stroke every ten seconds.

=== 1920-present: automated light ===
In 1920, the Lighthouse Service oversaw the automation of the Crib Light. In the Crib Light's new incarnation, kerosene was no longer necessary; instead, a traveling crew periodically delivered tanks of the flammable gas acetylene. A reliable pilot light burned day and night. When the sun set, the resulting drop in temperature would open a precision valve and release a flow of acetylene against the pilot light, causing the light to shine.

When the last Lighthouse keeper left in 1929, it quickly degraded. "The light earned the nickname 'The Dummy'” from the locals."

In the second half of the 20th century, the invention of radar and other electronic aids to navigation began to render many Great Lakes navigational light towers redundant. The Crib Light was considered by the Coast Guard to be "surplus" property. In 1984, the Crib Light tower was removed from its crib and placed on its current base located on the Gordon Turner Park pier head.

As noted by a Coast Guard researcher:

The light earned the nickname “The Dummy” from the locals. When locals learned of the Coast Guard’s plans to demolish the site, an agreement was made to donate the light to the city of Cheboygan. The light was moved to the West Breakwall in Gordon Turner Park. Restoration work has been done on the tower. The grounds are open to the public.

The Cheboygan Crib Light is now maintained by the municipality of Cheboygan; the light itself, which is now powered by electricity, is maintained by a local support group. The light tower is considered by many to be a symbol of Cheboygan. In 2003, the municipality succeeded in clearing its title to the light and erasing its status as "surplus" property nominally under the ownership of the federal General Services Administration.

== Location ==
The light is in Gordon Turner Park, which is located north of U.S. Highway 23 in Cheboygan, just west of the Cheboygan River. The park is at the end of Huron Street less than 1 mile (1.6 km) north of the highway. The park's boardwalk leads to the Cheboygan River and the light. The light may also be viewed from eastbound lighthouse cruises offered by Shepler's Ferry out of Mackinaw City.

It is not lighted at this time. Visitors to Gordon Turner Park can view and walk around the light at the end of Water Street in Cheboygan. A few blocks upriver is the Cheboygan River Front Range Light.
