= Sturgeon River (Prince Edward Island) =

- Location of the mouth of the Sturgeon River in Prince Edward Island

Location
- Country: Canada
- Province: Prince Edward Island
- County: Kings

Physical characteristics
- Source: Field
  - coordinates: 46°04′21″N 62°39′14″W
  - elevation: 72 m (236 ft)
- Mouth: Sturgeon Bay
  - coordinates: 46°07′00″N 62°32′00″W
  - elevation: 0 m (0 ft)
- Length: 14.8 km (9.2 mi)

Basin features
- River system: Atlantic Ocean drainage basin
- Tributaries
  - left: West Branch Sturgeon River
  - right: South Branch Sturgeon River

The Sturgeon River is a river in the Atlantic Ocean drainage basin in Kings County in eastern Prince Edward Island, Canada.

== Course ==
The Sturgeon River begins in a field about 2.7 kilometres (1.7 mi) southeast of the settlement of Brooklyn. It flows north, then turns east, passes over a dam, and flows past the community of Milltown Cross and Buffaloland Provincial Park. The river takes in the left tributary West Branch Sturgeon River, turns southeast, takes in the right tributary South Branch Sturgeon River, and reaches its mouth at Sturgeon Bay 1.5 kilometres (0.9 mi) northwest of the community of Sturgeon. Sturgeon Bay is part of the larger St. Marys Bay on the Northumberland Strait on the Gulf of Saint Lawrence, which leads to the Atlantic Ocean.

== Tributaries ==
- South Branch Sturgeon River (right)
- West Branch Sturgeon River (left)
