= Inland Waterway (Michigan) =

- Location within the state of Michigan
- 45°24′09″N 84°37′24″W
- Location: Cheboygan and Emmet counties Michigan

Michigan State Historic Site
- Designated: January 19, 1957

Detailed map of lakes of the Inland Waterway

The Inland Waterway or Inland Water Route is a 38-mile-long (61 km) series of rivers and lakes in the U.S. state of Michigan. With only a short portage, it forms a navigable route for small craft connecting Lake Huron and Crooked Lake, across the Northern Michigan region. Despite Little Traverse Bay being only 2 miles west of Crooked Lake, the waterway does not connect to it, making Lake Michigan inaccessible through this route.

The route is in Emmet and Cheboygan counties and consists of Crooked Lake, Crooked River, Burt Lake, Indian River, Mullett Lake, and the Cheboygan River.

The route passes through or near the communities of Conway, Oden, Ponshewaing, Alanson, Indian River, Topinabee, and Cheboygan.

== History ==
=== Early history ===
The Inland Waterway was originally used by Native Americans to avoid the strong waves around Waugoshance Point on Lake Michigan. Consequently, 50 Native American encampments have been discovered along the shores of the Inland Water Route. One such encampment, located in Ponshewaing, has artifacts dating back over 3,000 years.

=== Settlement in 1800s ===
The Grand Rapids and Indiana Railroad reached Petoskey in 1873. This opened up the surrounding area to tourism, settlers, and lumbermen. This eventually led to various people proposing different ideas for the water way. One such plan was the transportation of mail along the waterway. This involved the dredging of Crooked River. Freight was eventually transported along the route. With the advent of the railroad as a cheaper means with which to move goods, the Inland Waterway fell into decline.

== The Inland Waterway today ==
Today the region surrounding the route is still a tourist destination. The historical society for the region was founded in 2004 and is known as The Inland Water Route Historical Society. It also is home to a museum in Alanson. There are four state campgrounds and several private ones along the route as well as hotels for accommodations. Several marinas are available for supplies and fuel.

The waterway is maintained to a depth of five feet (1.5 m). There are two locks (at Cheboygan and Alanson) and a swinging bridge along the route. The locks can handle boats 60 feet (18 m) in length and 17 feet (5.2 m) of beam. The lowest non-movable bridge on the route has a height of 14.7 feet (4.5 m). The locks are in operation from mid-April to late October. The shortest crossings of Burt Lake and Mullett Lake cover 6.5 miles (10.5 km) and 10 miles (16 km), respectively, and each take a boat as much as a mile offshore.

== Images ==
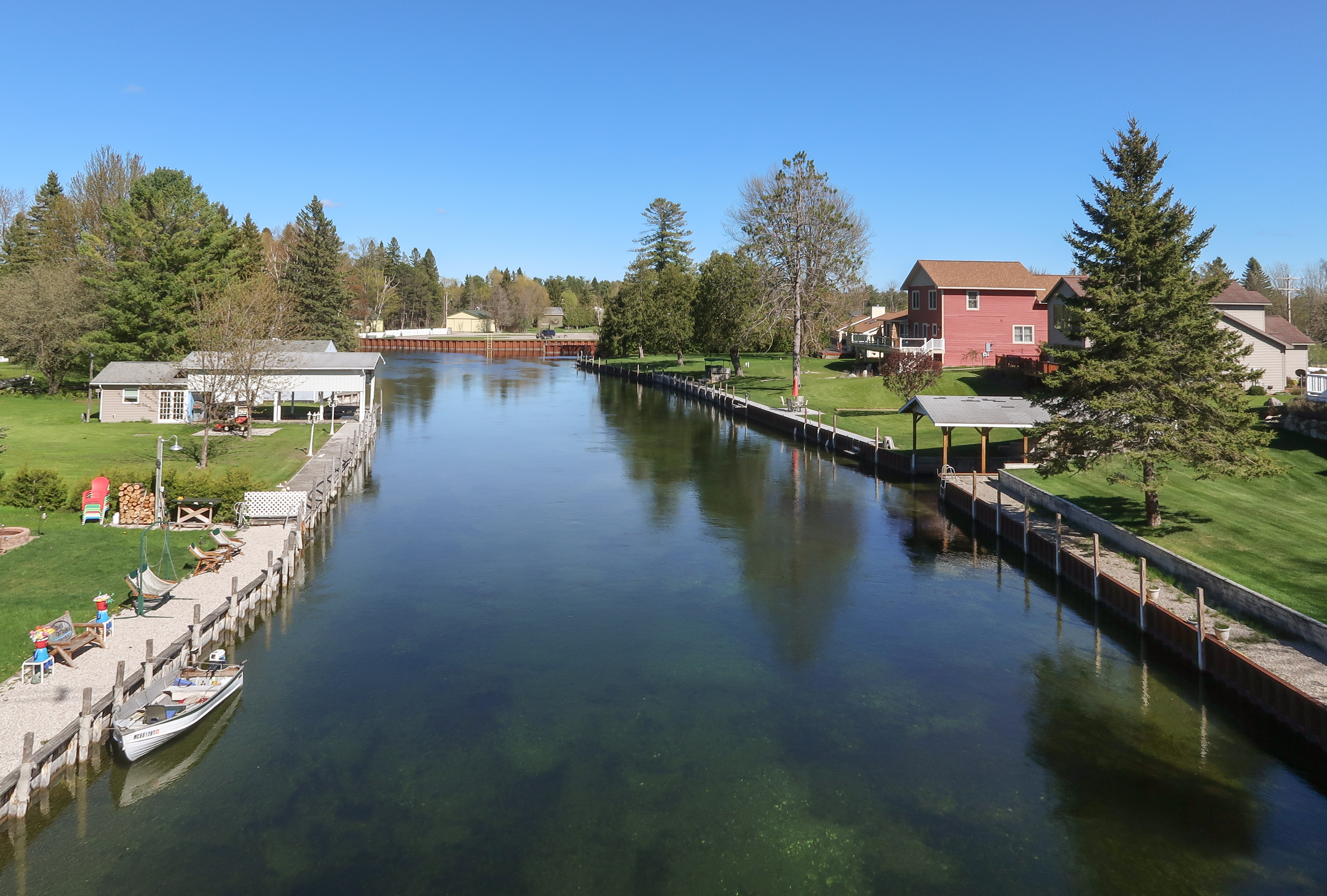
Indian River

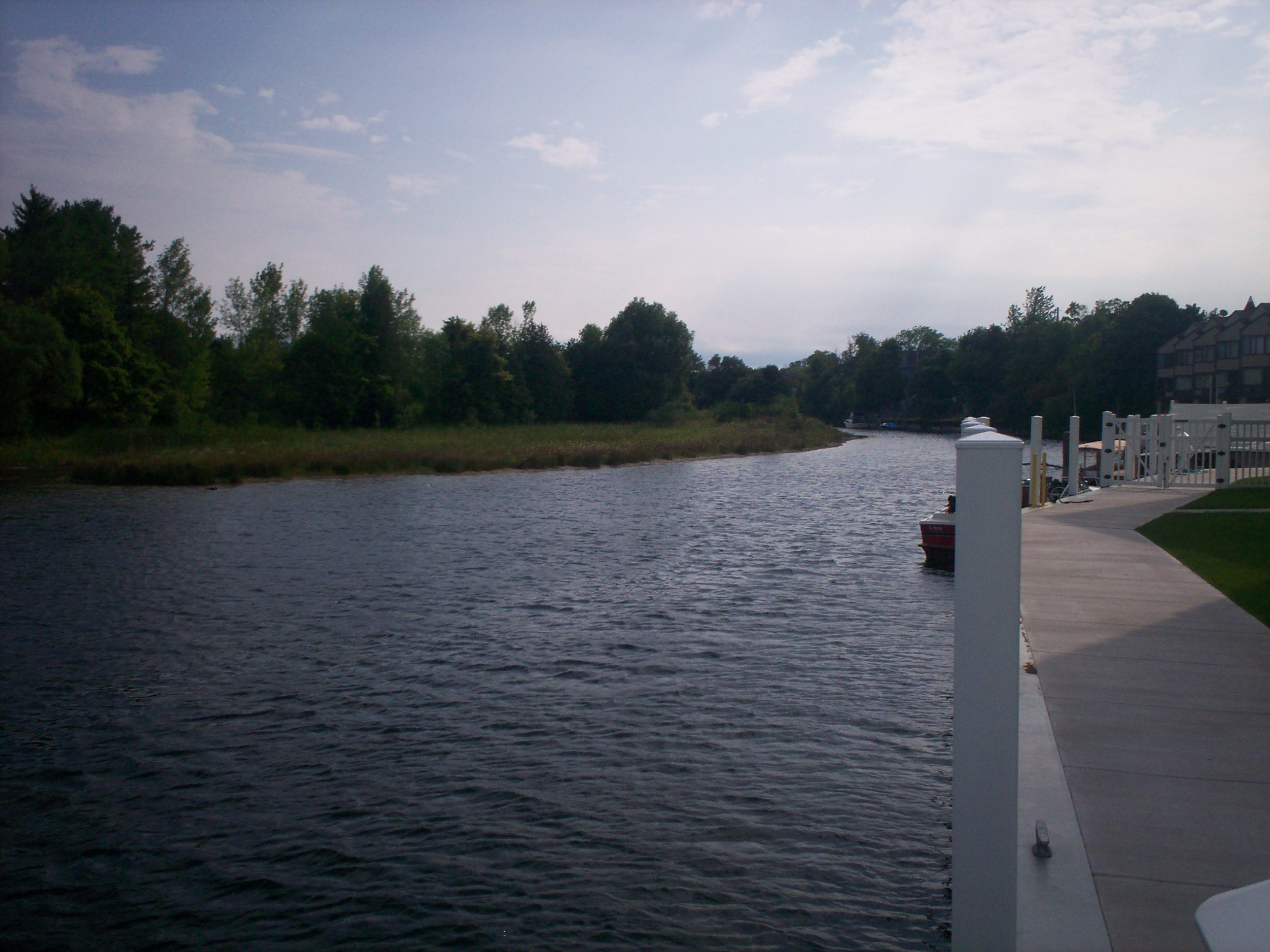
Cheboygan River

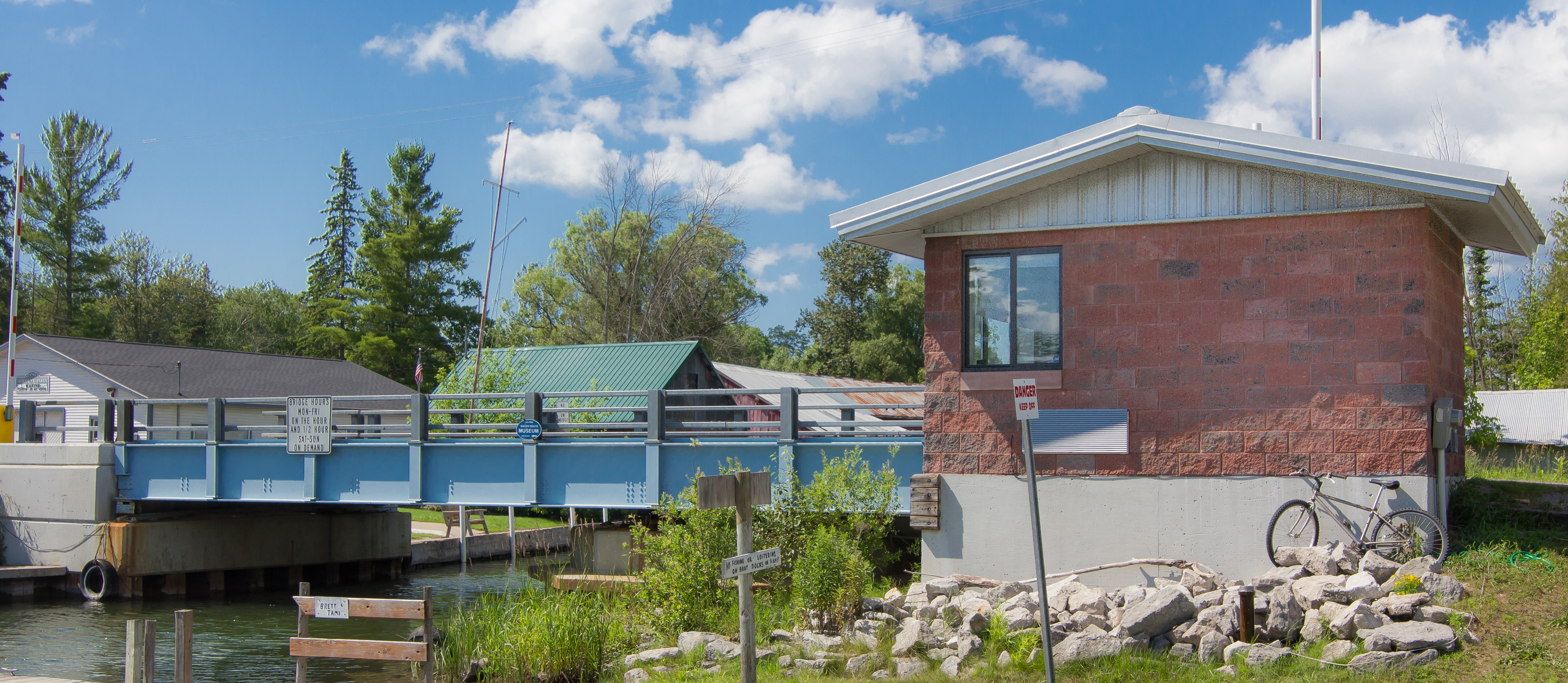
Alanson swing bridge

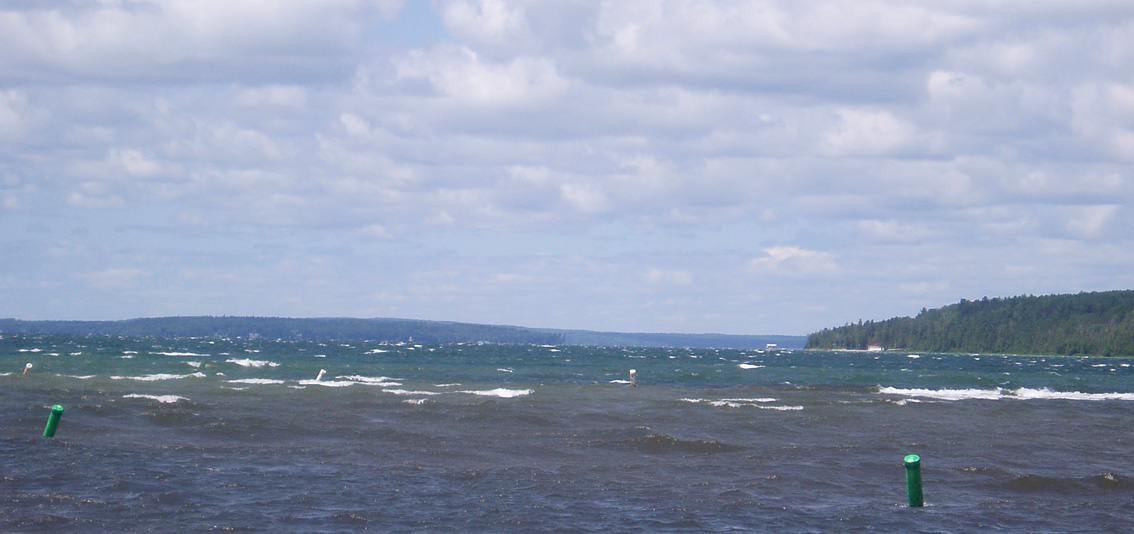
Burt Lake

== See also ==
- Elk River Chain of Lakes Watershed
