= Lynchburg, North Dakota =

Community in North Dakota, US

- Unincorporated community
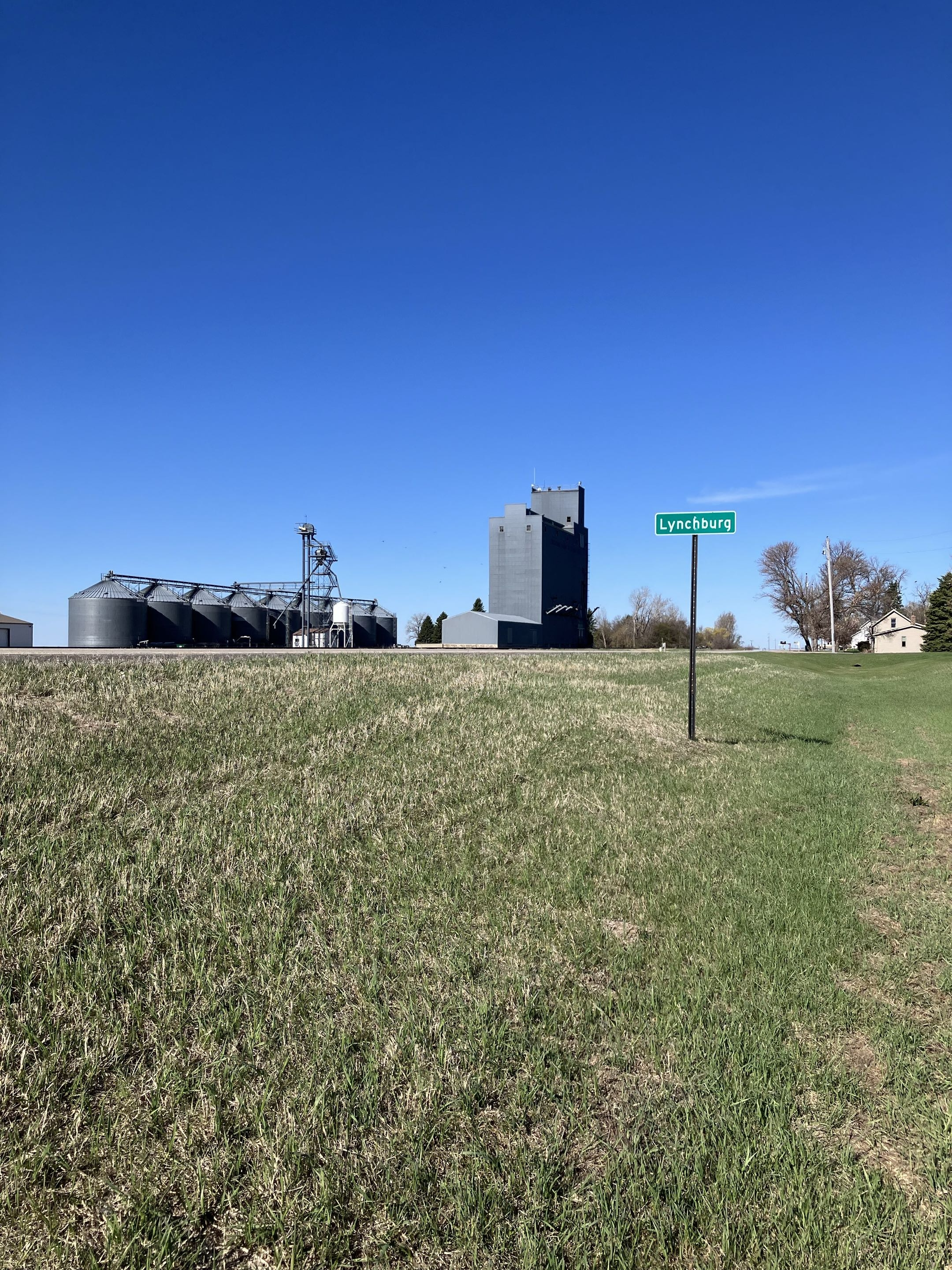

- Location within North Dakota Location within the United States
- Country: United States
- State: North Dakota
- County: Cass
- Township: Maple River
- Elevation: 955 ft (291 m)
- Time zone: UTC-6 (Central (CST))
  - Summer (DST): UTC-5 (CDT)
- ZIP code: 58059 (Mapleton)
- Area code: 701
- GNIS feature ID: 1033775

Lynchburg is an unincorporated community in Maple River Township, Cass County, in the U.S. state of North Dakota.

== History ==
A post office called Lynchburg was established in 1895, and remained in operation until 1911. The community was named for Frank Lynch, a railroad official.
