= Maple River (Burt Lake) =

Michigan river

Coordinates: 45°28′53″N 84°42′43″W

The Maple River, which flows into Burt Lake, is a major river in the northern tip of the Lower Peninsula of the U.S. state of Michigan. The river drains sections of Cheboygan County and Emmet County, and provides an outflow for the 3,395-acre (1,374 ha) Douglas Lake.

== Description ==
The West Branch of the Maple River rises in a wetland, the Pleasantview Swamp, located in Pleasantview Township in central Emmet County. After flowing north, it turns east and then south, draining the town of Pellston and its airport. Much of the river's course goes through the Mackinaw State Forest, a semi-protected environmental area, and the river is considered to be a good-quality stream for trout, including brook trout, brown trout, and rainbow trout. A three-year trout survey done (2010–2012) by the Michigan Department of Natural Resources (MDNR) indicated that European-origin brown trout make up at least 94% of the total trout population of the river.

South of Pellston, the river's West Branch runs into Lake Kathleen, a small flowage created by the logging-era Maple River Dam (reconstructed in 1967). Water from Douglas Lake, flowing through the East Branch of the Maple River, joins with the main river here. Maple River Township, a semi-built-up area with pastureland farms and summer homes, is named after the now-substantial stream. The river changes course once again, this time toward the southeast, and flows through a second wetland from Emmet County into Cheboygan County. The river then discharges through a laced network of outflow creeks, locally called "the spreads", into Maple Bay and the adjacent Bullhead Bay on the shoreline of Burt Lake.

After flowing through the Cheboygan River, the waters from Maple River eventually discharge into Lake Huron.

The Maple River, including its West Branch and East Branch, drain an area of approximately 168 square miles (440 km^{2}) in Michigan's extreme Northern Lower Peninsula.

== In popular culture ==
Sufjan Stevens wrote an instrumental piece entitled "Maple River" inspired by his childhood fishing with his brother and father at the Maple River.
