= Maple River Township, North Dakota =

Township in North Dakota, US

- Township
- Location within North Dakota
- Coordinates: 46°45′36″N 97°14′32″W
- Country: United States
- State: North Dakota
- County: Cass

Area
  - Total: 35.69 sq mi (92.43 km^{2})
  - Land: 35.65 sq mi (92.34 km^{2})
  - Water: 0.035 sq mi (0.09 km^{2})
- Elevation: 942 ft (287 m)

Population (2020)
  - Total: 119
  - Density: 3.34/sq mi (1.29/km^{2})
- Time zone: UTC-6 (Central (CST))
  - Summer (DST): UTC-5 (CDT)
- Area code: 701
- FIPS code: 38-50540
- GNIS feature ID: 1036364

Maple River Township is a township in Cass County, North Dakota, United States. The population was 119 at the 2020 census.

The unincorporated community of Lynchburg is located in Maple River Township.

== Geography ==
Maple River Township has a total area of 35.688 square miles (92.43 km^{2}), of which 35.652 square miles (92.34 km^{2}) is land and 0.036 square miles (0.093 km^{2}) is water.

== Demographics ==
As of the 2023 American Community Survey, there were an estimated 43 households.
