= Crooked River (Michigan) =

Location
- Country: United States

Physical characteristics
- Source
  - location: Crooked Lake in Littlefield Township, Emmet County, Michigan
- Mouth
  - location: Burt Lake in Burt Township, Cheboygan County, Michigan

The Crooked River (Michigan) is a river in Emmet and Cheboygan counties in the U.S. state of Michigan. It is a short stream, 5.6 miles (9.0 km) long, flowing northeast from Crooked Lake at 45°25′58″N 84°47′19″W near Alanson into Burt Lake at 45°28′14″N 84°43′38″W. It forms part of the Inland Waterway of Michigan. The river is the subject of the Sufjan Stevens song "Alanson, Crooked River" from his 2003 album Michigan.
