= Turgeon (disambiguation) =

Turgeon is a surname.

Turgeon may also refer to:

- Turgeon (horse), a French thoroughbred racehorse
- Turgeon River (Harricana River), a tributary of the Harricana River, Quebec, Canada
- Turgeon River (rivière des Hurons), a river in Stoneham-et-Tewkesbury, Quebec, Canada
- Lake Turgeon, a freshwater body in the Northwest province of Quebec, Canada
