= Mullett Lake =

Lake in the state of Michigan, United States

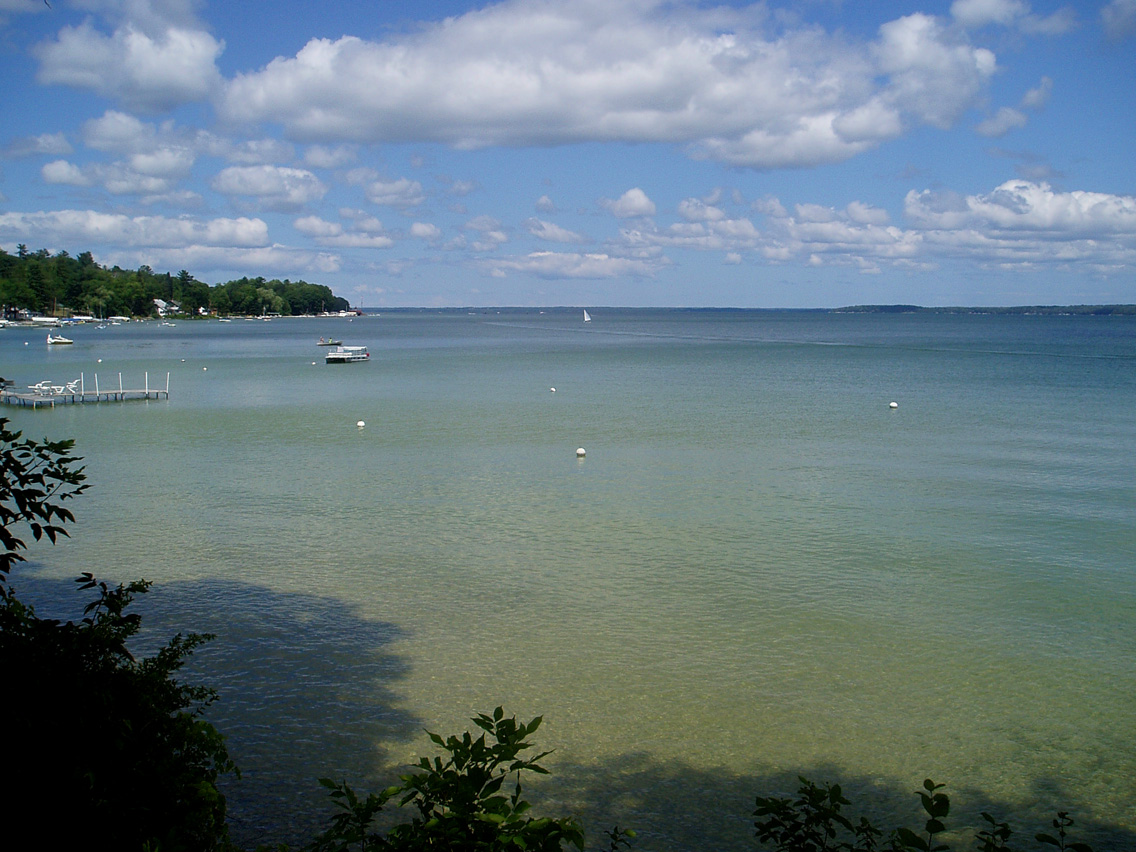

- Location within Michigan Location within the United States
- Location: Cheboygan County, Michigan
- Coordinates: 45°30′54″N 84°31′29″W
- Type: Lake
- Primary inflows: Indian River, Pigeon River, Little Pigeon River, Sturgeon River, Mullett Creek
- Primary outflows: Cheboygan River
- Basin countries: United States
- Max. length: 10 mi (16 km)
- Max. width: 4 mi (6.4 km)
- Surface area: 16,630 acres (67.3 km^{2})
- Max. depth: 148 ft (45 m)
- Surface elevation: 594 feet (181 m)

Mullett Lake is a lake in Cheboygan County in the U.S. state of Michigan. The lake is named after John Mullett, who, together with William A. Burt, made a federal survey of the area from 1840 to 1843. A neighboring lake was named after Burt. Historically, Mullett Lake has been recorded as Mullet Lake, Mullet's Lake, and Mullett's Lake on maps and documents.

== Description of lake ==
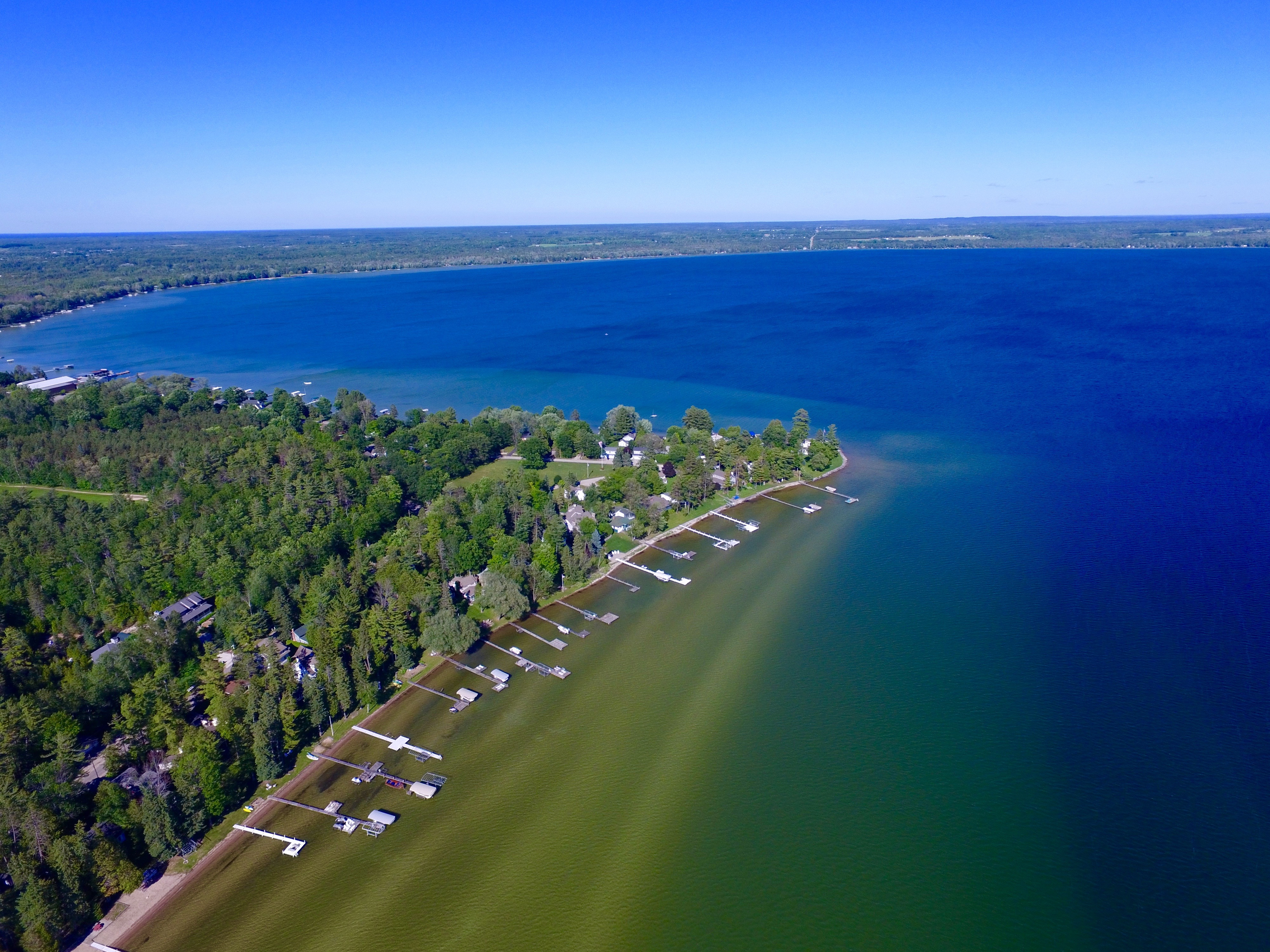

Major inflows to the lake are the Indian River, which connects with nearby Burt Lake, Pigeon River, Little Pigeon River, and Mullett Creek. The Cheboygan River flows out of the northeast end of the lake.

The lake is part of the Inland Waterway, by which one can boat 38 miles (61 km) from Crooked Lake and Round Lake near the Little Traverse Bay on Lake Michigan across the northern tip of the Lower Peninsula to Cheboygan on Lake Huron.

The Inland Waterway was a Native American trade route that was later opened to small steamer and modern recreational traffic.

Interstate 75 passes to the west of the lake, with two interchanges near the south end of the lake at the unincorporated community of Indian River. M-27 passes along the northern shore of the lake through the unincorporated communities of Mullett Lake and Topinabee, while M-33 running north–south passes along a portion of the eastern shore through the community of Aloha.

Mullett Lake is an excellent fishery, containing large populations of game species, including brown trout, brook trout, rainbow trout, lake trout, splake, smelt, northern Pike, muskellunge, yellow perch, walleye, smallmouth bass, largemouth bass, sunfish and most notably lake sturgeon (the state record specimen was taken from these waters)

In the census-designated place of Mullett Lake, which is located on the north end of Mullett Lake, there is a historic former Michigan Central passenger train station. The station sits directly at the end of Polish Line Road and has about 200 feet (61 m) of lake front property. It was bought in 1950 by an old railroad employee once it shut down and was turned into a family cottage. The "Old Depot", which is the nickname for the cottage, was the main connection between Detroit and Mackinaw City. The former railbed now serves as the North Central State Trail.

== See also ==
- List of lakes in Michigan
