= Douglas Lake (Cheboygan County, Michigan) =

Lake in the state of Michigan, United States

Douglas Lake (Cheboygan County, Michigan USA)
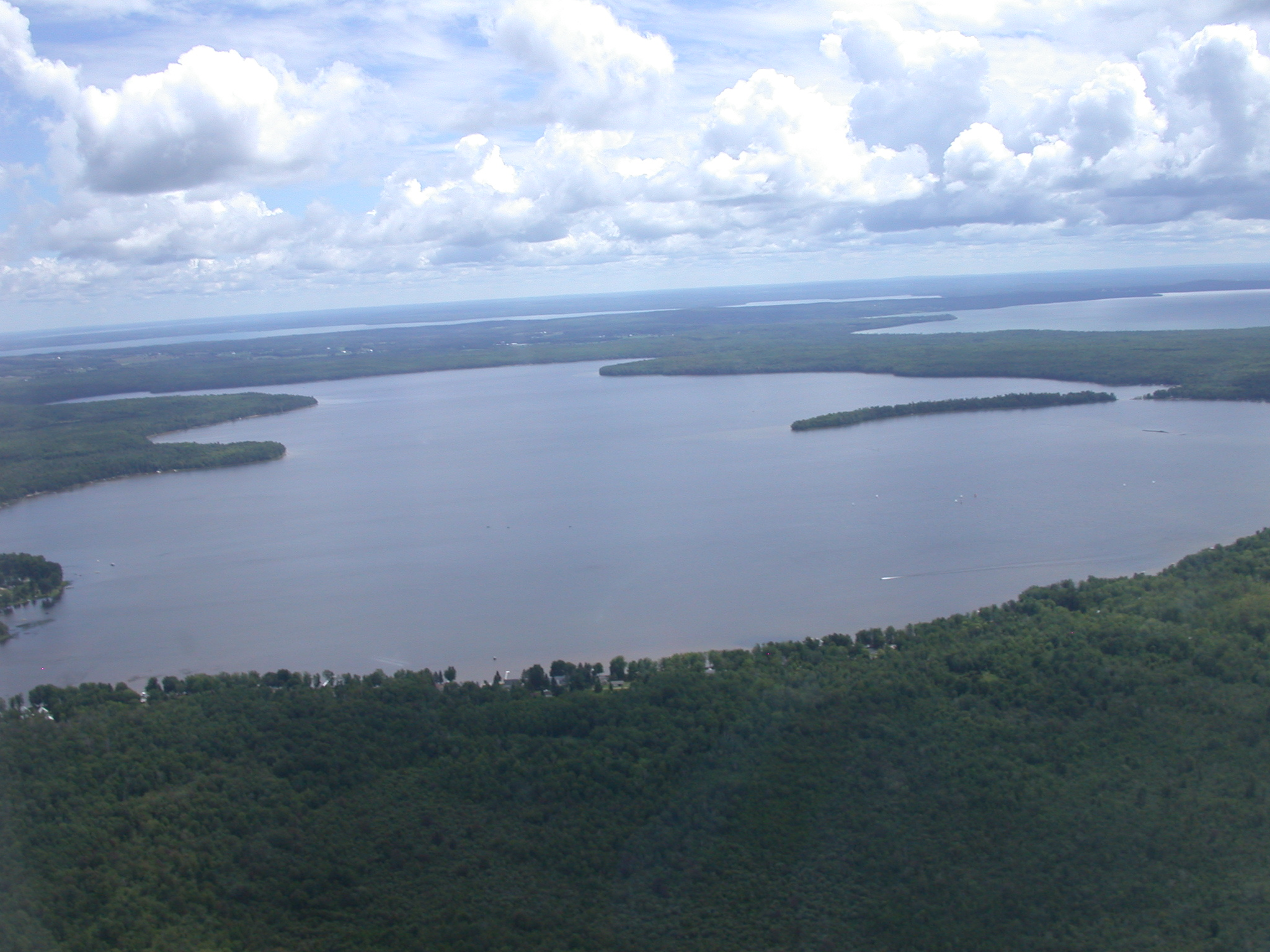
- Douglas Lake (Cheboygan County, Michigan)

- Location within Michigan
- Location: Cheboygan County, Michigan
- Coordinates: 45°34′N 84°42′W
- Type: Lake
- Primary inflows: Bessey Creek, Beavertail Creek
- Primary outflows: East Branch Maple River
- Catchment area: 12,800 acres (5,200 ha)
- Basin countries: United States
- Max. length: 3.9 mi (6.3 km)
- Max. width: 1.9 mi (3.1 km)
- Surface area: 3,395 acres (1,374 ha)
- Max. depth: 79 ft (24 m)
- Surface elevation: 713 ft (217 m)

Douglas Lake is an inland lake located in Cheboygan County on the northern tip of Michigan's Lower Peninsula. It is the 28th largest lake in Michigan with an areal coverage of 3,395 acres (1,374 ha) and a maximum depth of 79 feet (24 m). The lake has two tributaries, Bessey Creek and Beavertail Creek and one outlet, the East Branch Maple River. Douglas Lake is part of the headwaters for the Maple River, a Blue Ribbon trout stream.

Much of the southern shoreline of Douglas Lake is undeveloped as it is owned by the University of Michigan Biological Station and is used for research and educational purposes. The University of Michigan Biological Station and the Tip of the Mitt Watershed Council both maintain extensive records describing the biotic and abiotic features of Douglas Lake.

== See also ==
- List of lakes in Michigan
