= Burt Lake =

Lake in Cheboygan County, Michigan, USA

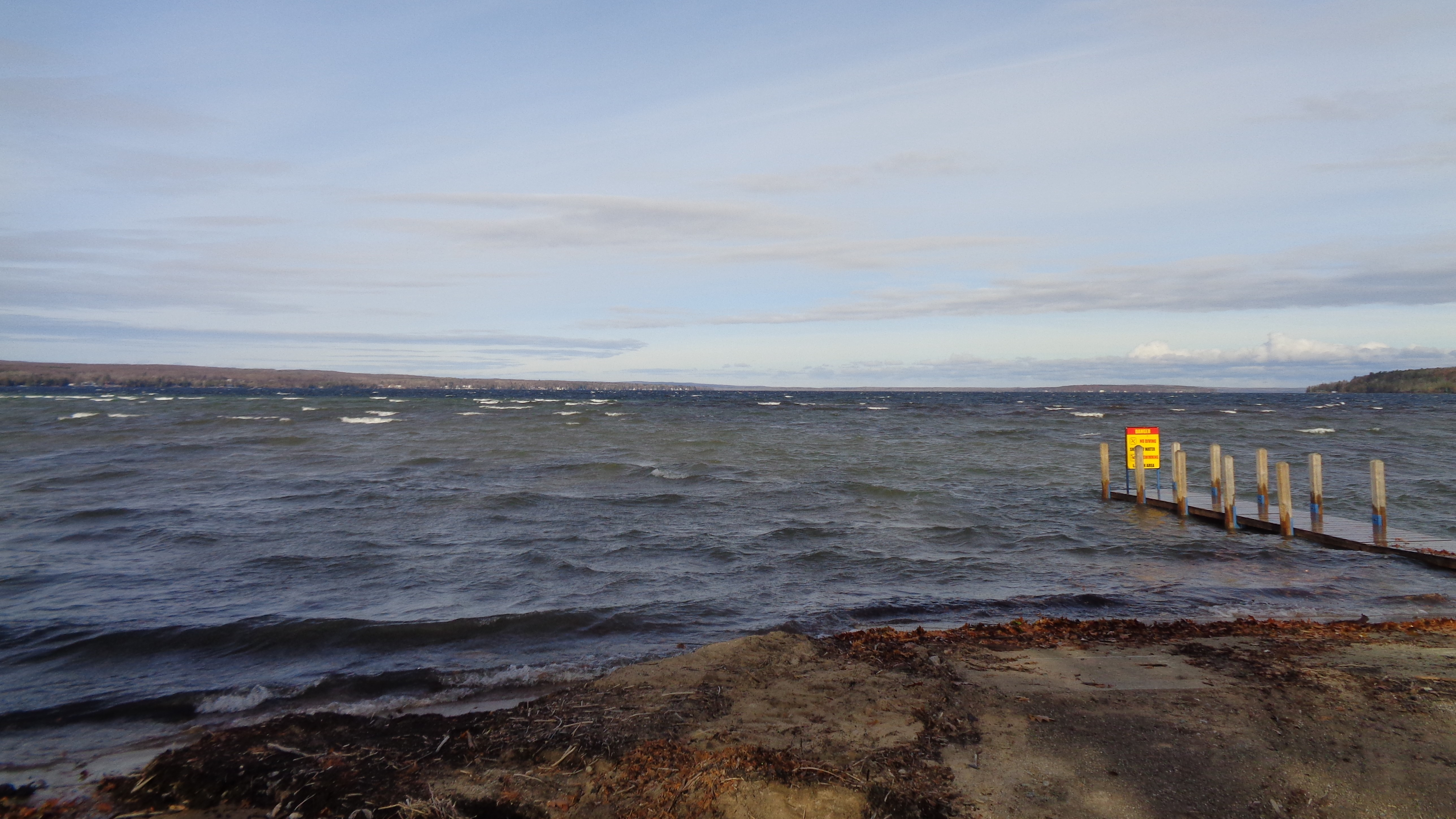
- Burt Lake from Burt Lake State Park

- Location within the state of Michigan
- Location: Cheboygan County, Michigan
- Coordinates: 45.47°N 84.67°W
- Primary inflows: Maple River, Crooked River, Sturgeon River
- Primary outflows: Indian River
- Basin countries: United States
- Max. length: 10 mi (16 km)
- Max. width: 5 mi (8.0 km)
- Surface area: 17,120 acres (6,930 ha)
- Max. depth: 73 ft (22 m)
- Surface elevation: 594 ft (181 m)

Burt Lake is a 17,120 acres (69.3 km^{2}) lake in Cheboygan County in the U.S. state of Michigan. The western shore of the lake is on the boundary with Emmet County. The lake is named after William Austin Burt, who, together with John Mullett, made a federal survey of the area from 1840 to 1843.

The lake is approximately 10 miles (16 km) long from north to south, about 5 miles (8.0 km) at its widest, and 73 feet (22 m) at its deepest. Major inflows to the lake are the Maple River, which connects with nearby Douglas Lake, the Crooked River, which connects with nearby Crooked Lake, the Sturgeon River which enters the lake near the point where the Indian River flows out of the lake into nearby Mullett Lake and the Little Carp River which enters on the northern end of the lake.

The lake is part of the Inland Waterway, by which one can boat from Crooked Lake several miles (km) east of Petoskey on the Little Traverse Bay of Lake Michigan across the northern tip of the lower peninsula's so-called mitten to Cheboygan on Lake Huron. Along with nearby Mullett Lake and Black Lake, it is noted for its population of Lake Sturgeon, which briefly held the record of largest sturgeon caught in the USA.

YMCA Camp Al-Gon-Quian and Burt Lake State Park are both located on the southern shore of the lake. The unincorporated community of Burt Lake is on the southwest shore on M-68. Interstate 75 passes to the east of the lake, with two interchanges near the south end of the lake at the unincorporated community of Indian River.

== See also ==
- Burt Lake Band of Chippewa and Ottawa Indians
- Burt Lake Burn-Out
- List of lakes in Michigan
