= Crooked Lake (Michigan) =

Lake in the state of Michigan, United States

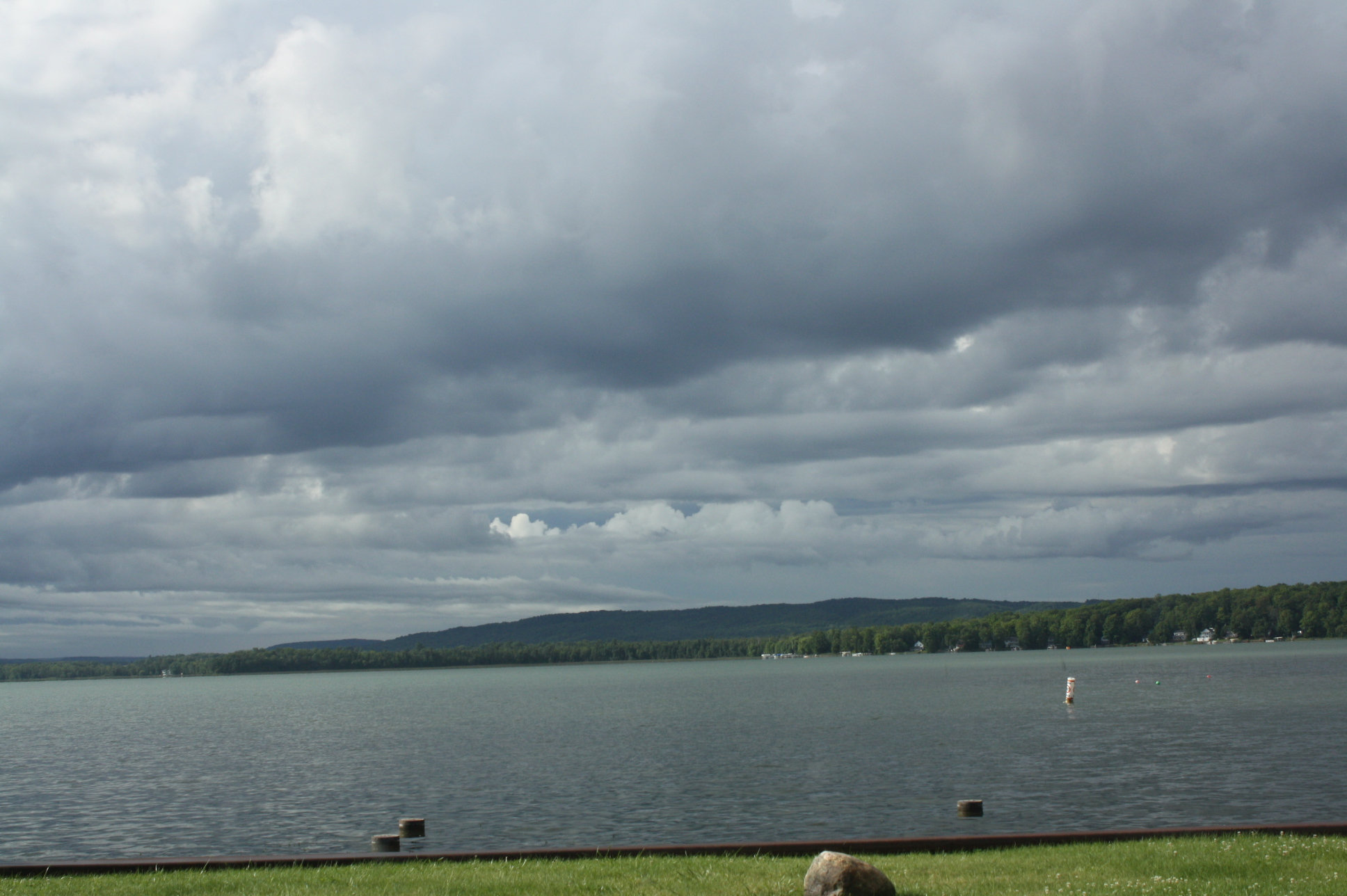

- Location within Michigan
- Location: Emmet County, Michigan
- Coordinates: 45°24′40″N 84°49′41″W
- Type: Lake
- Basin countries: United States
- Surface area: 2,300 acres (930 ha)
- Max. depth: 50 ft (15 m)
- Surface elevation: 595 feet (181 m)
- Settlements: Conway, Oden, Ponshewaing

Crooked Lake is a lake that feeds the Crooked River. Located within Emmet County in the U.S. state of Michigan, it is the southwesternmost point of the recreational Inland Waterway. This watercourse uses locks to connect Crooked Lake with Lake Huron at Cheboygan. The discharge of water from Crooked Lake is controlled by the Alanson Waterway Locks located near Alanson, Michigan.

The lake is a remnant of the postglacial Lake Nipissing. Its convoluted shape is the outcome of the glacier-cut topography through which its water drains, which includes lateral moraines, recessional moraines, and at least one kettle gouged by melting ice.

Three small lakeside communities, Conway, Oden, and Ponshewaing, reflect the historic operations of depots of the Grand Rapids and Indiana Railroad that once brought residents and visitors to and from the lake. Today the north shore of the lake is served by U.S. Highway 31, and a continuous strip of development joins together the road and lake.

== See also ==
- List of lakes in Michigan
