= Indian River, Michigan =

- Census-designated place (CDP) & unincorporated community
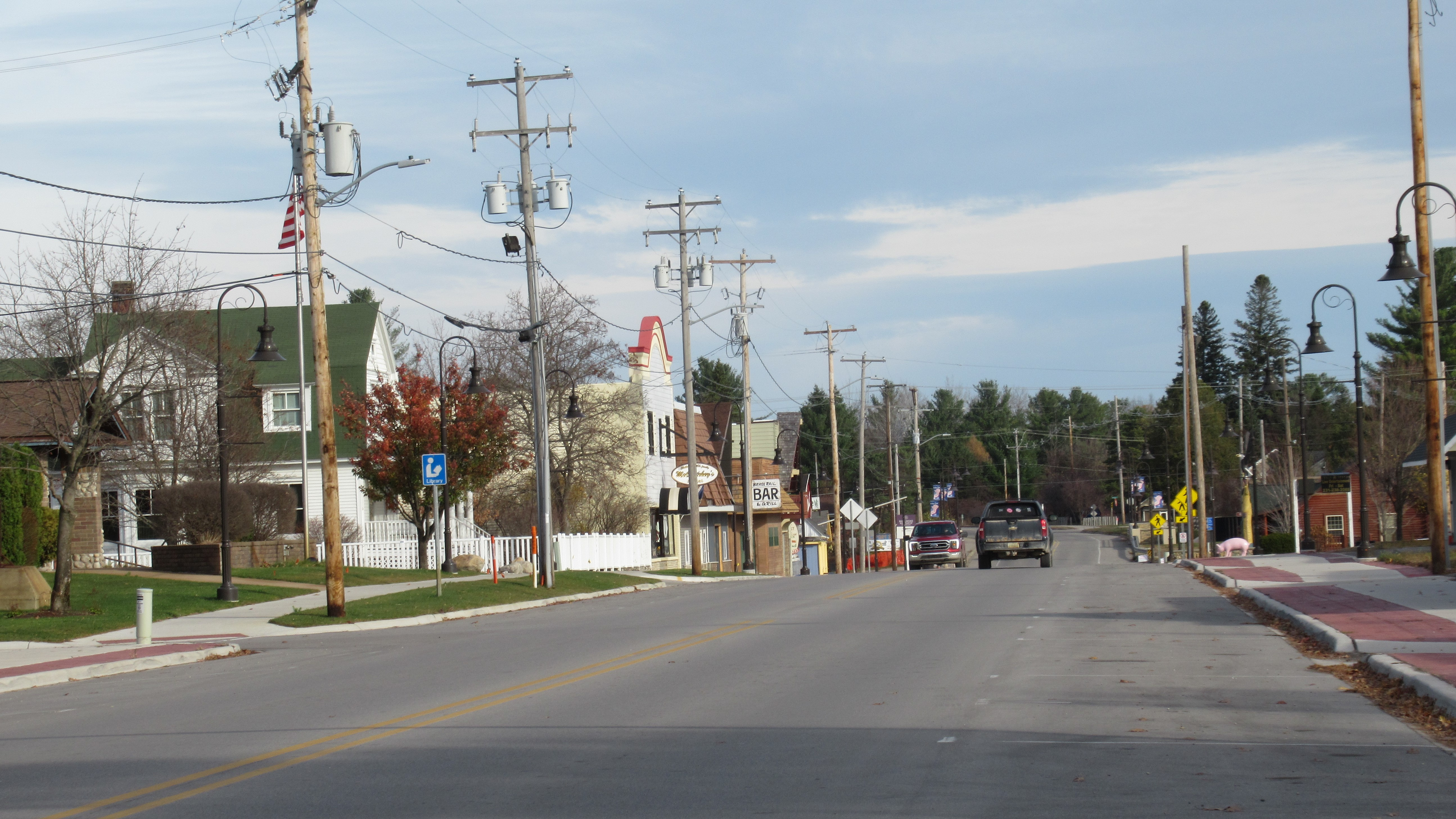
- Looking north along S. Straits Highway

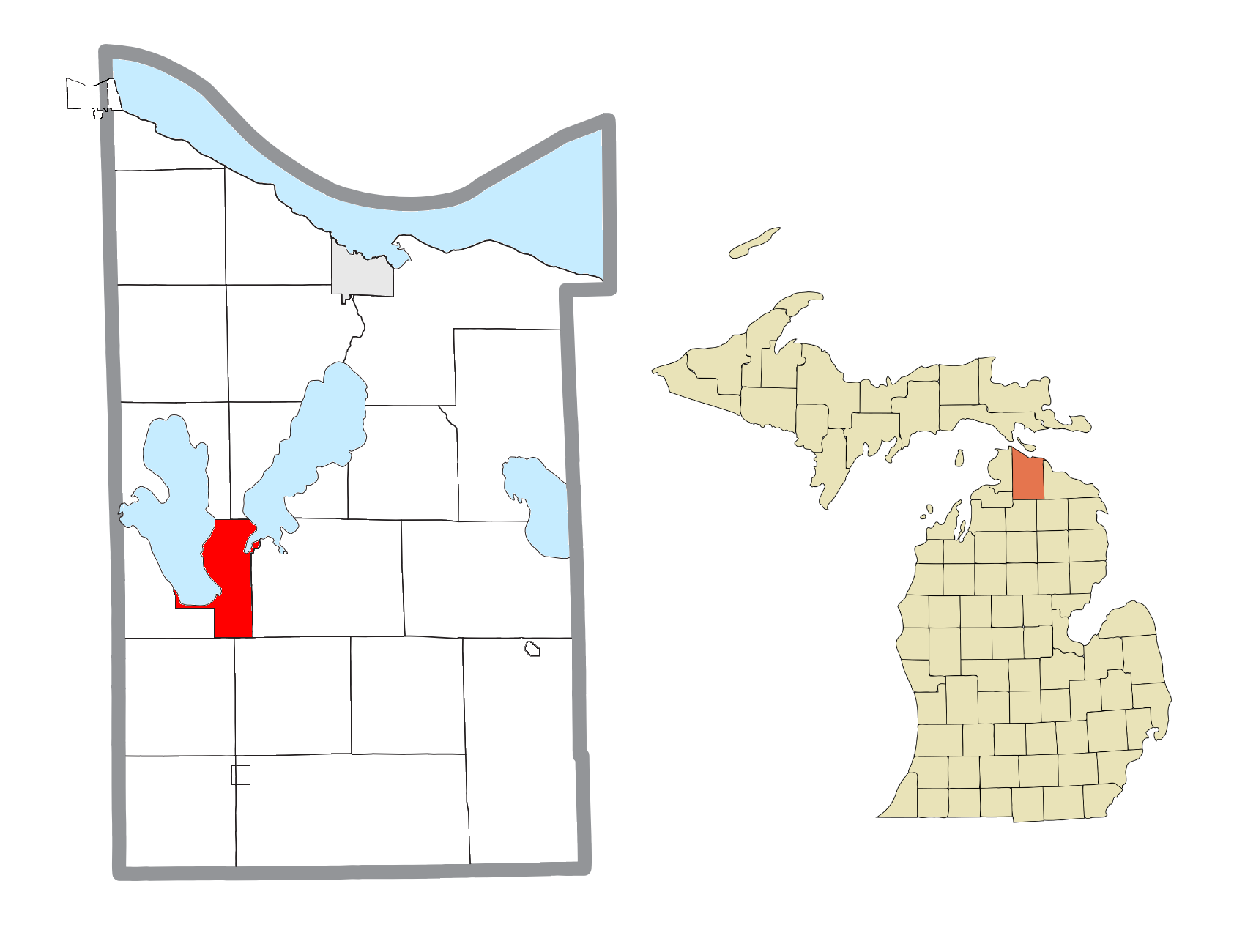
- Location within Cheboygan County

- Location within the state of Michigan Location within the United States
- Coordinates: 45°24′45″N 84°36′45″W
- Country: United States
- State: Michigan
- County: Cheboygan
- Township: Tuscarora
- Settled: 1876
- Platted: 1880

Area
  - Total: 20.29 sq mi (52.54 km^{2})
  - Land: 12.93 sq mi (33.48 km^{2})
  - Water: 7.36 sq mi (19.06 km^{2})
- Elevation: 614 ft (187 m)

Population (2020)
  - Total: 1,950
  - Density: 150.81/sq mi (58.23/km^{2})
- Time zone: UTC-5 (Eastern (EST))
  - Summer (DST): UTC-4 (EDT)
- ZIP code(s): 49749
- Area code: 231
- FIPS code: 26-40480
- GNIS feature ID: 0629015

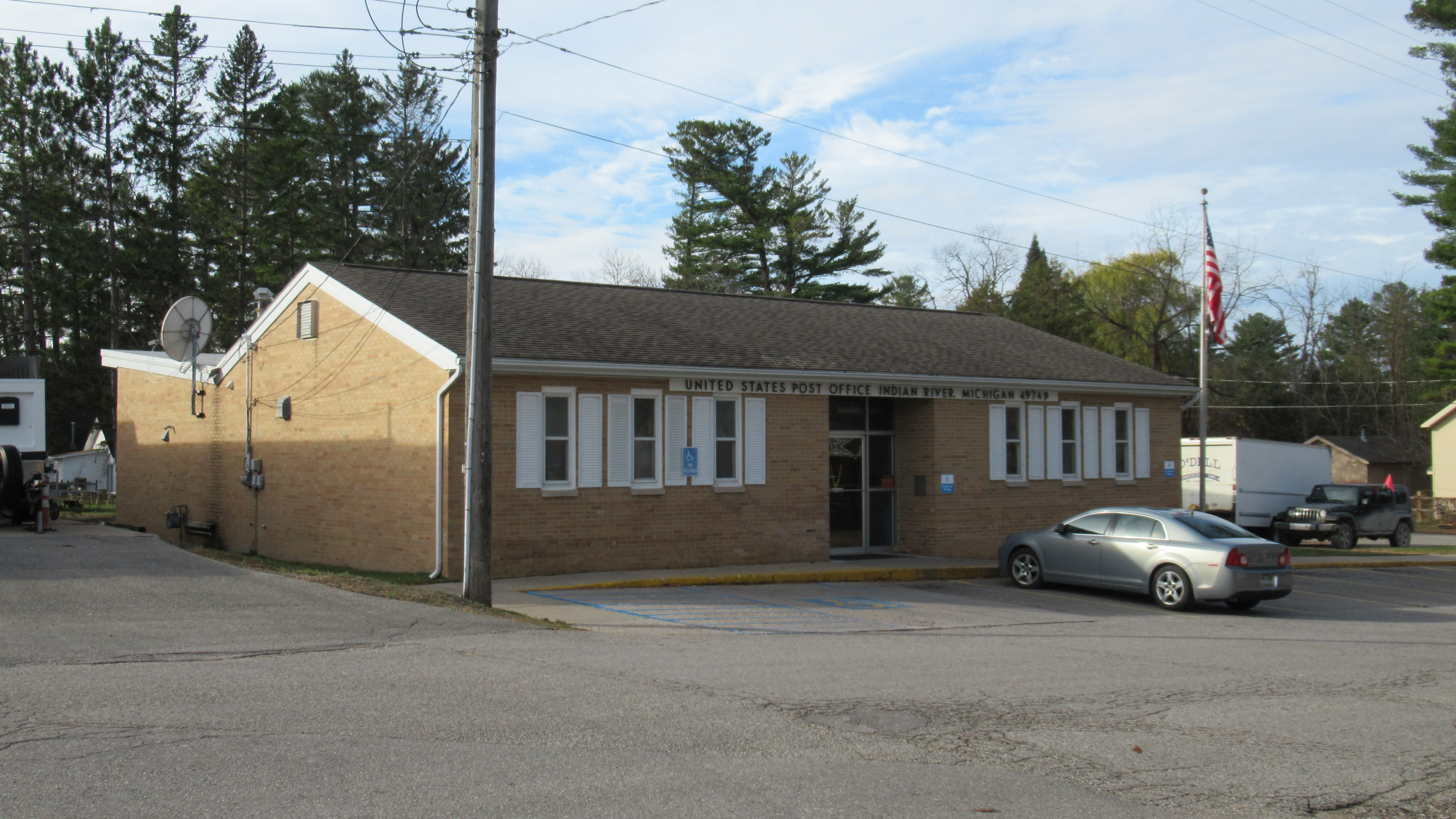
U.S. Post Office in Indian River

Indian River is an unincorporated community and census-designated place (CDP) in Cheboygan County in the U.S. state of Michigan. The population was 1,950 at the 2020 census. The CDP is located in Tuscarora Township between Burt Lake and Mullett Lake.

As an unincorporated community, Indian River has no legal autonomy of its own but does have its own post office with the 49749 ZIP Code, which also serves small portions of several surrounding townships.

== History ==
The area of Indian River was first settled as early as 1876. The community was founded two years later by land owner Floyd Martin and surveyed and platted by Oliver Hayden by 1880. The new settlement was named after the Indian River, which flows through the community. A post office was established on September 22, 1879.

The North Central State Trail goes through the town. The National Shrine of the Cross in the Woods, an open-air sanctuary, is located in Indian River and dedicated to Kateri Tekakwitha, the first Native American saint.

== Geography ==
According to the U.S. Census Bureau, the CDP has a total area of 20.29 square miles (52.55 km^{2}), of which 12.93 square miles (33.49 km^{2}) is land and 7.36 square miles (19.06 km^{2}) (36.27%) is water.

Indian River is situated along the course of the Indian River, which connects Burt Lake and Mullett Lake. The Sturgeon River also drains into Burt Lake within the community. Burt Lake State Park is located within the community on the southeastern shores of Burt Lake.

=== Major highways ===
- I-75 runs south–north through the center of the community and continues north to the Mackinac Bridge.
- M-68 runs from Alanson and runs through the southern portion of the community, meeting I-75 and continuing east to Onaway and Rogers City.
- M-27 follows former route of US 27, has its southern terminus at I-75 within Indian River and continues north to Cheboygan.

== Demographics ==
Historical population
Census	Pop.	Note	%±
2000	2,008		—
2010	1,959		−2.4%
2020	1,950		−0.5%
U.S. Decennial Census

=== 2020 census ===
As of the 2020 census, Indian River had a population of 1,950. The median age was 55.8 years. 14.5% of residents were under the age of 18 and 34.2% of residents were 65 years of age or older. For every 100 females there were 95.4 males, and for every 100 females age 18 and over there were 92.7 males age 18 and over.

0.0% of residents lived in urban areas, while 100.0% lived in rural areas.

There were 926 households in Indian River, of which 17.0% had children under the age of 18 living in them. Of all households, 50.6% were married-couple households, 18.5% were households with a male householder and no spouse or partner present, and 23.3% were households with a female householder and no spouse or partner present. About 31.9% of all households were made up of individuals and 17.0% had someone living alone who was 65 years of age or older.

There were 1,644 housing units, of which 43.7% were vacant. The homeowner vacancy rate was 0.4% and the rental vacancy rate was 10.0%.

Racial composition as of the 2020 census
Race	Number	Percent
White	1,788	91.7%
Black or African American	1	0.1%
American Indian and Alaska Native	52	2.7%
Asian	11	0.6%
Native Hawaiian and Other Pacific Islander	0	0.0%
Some other race	6	0.3%
Two or more races	92	4.7%
Hispanic or Latino (of any race)	30	1.5%

=== 2000 census ===
As of the census of 2000, there were 2,008 people, 929 households, and 614 families residing in the CDP. The population density was 156.4 inhabitants per square mile (60.4/km^{2}). There were 1,586 housing units at an average density of 123.5 per square mile (47.7/km^{2}). The racial makeup of the CDP was 97.16% White, 0.05% Black or African American, 0.90% Native American, 0.10% Asian, 0.20% from other races, and 1.59% from two or more races. Hispanic or Latino of any race were 1.44% of the population.

There were 929 households, out of which 23.0% had children under the age of 18 living with them, 56.6% were married couples living together, 7.4% had a female householder with no husband present, and 33.9% were non-families. 29.9% of all households were made up of individuals, and 14.3% had someone living alone who was 65 years of age or older. The average household size was 2.16 and the average family size was 2.65.

In the CDP, the population was spread out, with 19.0% under the age of 18, 4.9% from 18 to 24, 22.5% from 25 to 44, 29.5% from 45 to 64, and 24.1% who were 65 years of age or older. The median age was 47 years. For every 100 females, there were 93.8 males. For every 100 females age 18 and over, there were 90.6 males.

The median income for a household in the CDP was $34,854, and the median income for a family was $41,667. Males had a median income of $40,139 versus $21,042 for females. The per capita income for the CDP was $20,191. About 5.5% of families and 7.1% of the population were below the poverty line, including 8.7% of those under age 18 and 5.3% of those age 65 or over.
