= Cheboygan River =

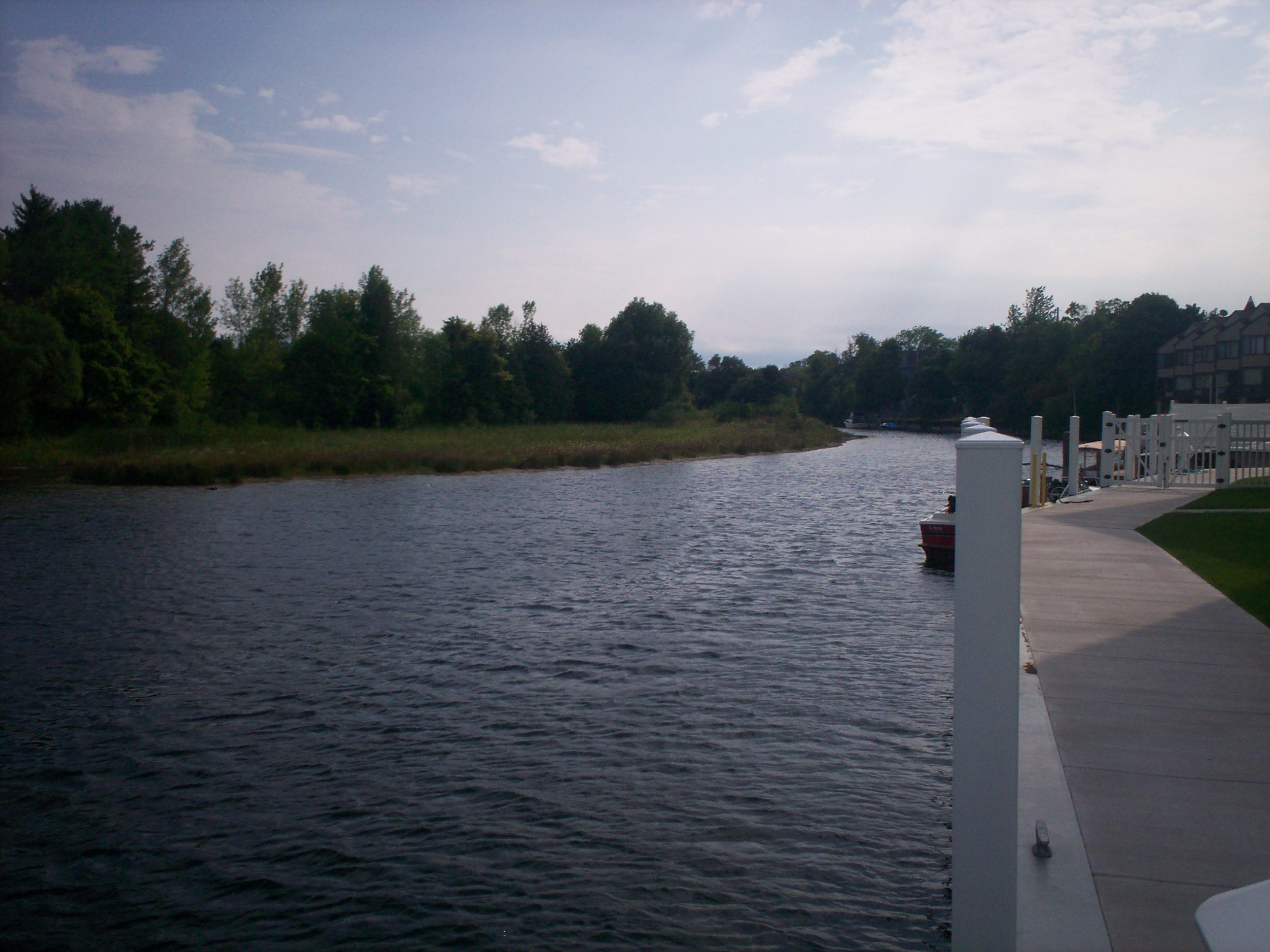
- Cheboygan River flowing through Cheboygan

Location
- Country: United States

Physical characteristics
- Source
  - location: Mullett Lake
  - elevation: 594 ft (181 m)
- Mouth
  - location: Lake Huron at Cheboygan
  - elevation: 581 ft (177 m)
- Length: 7.0 mi (11.3 km)

The Cheboygan River (/ʃəˈbɔɪɡən/ shə-BOY-gən) is a river in the U.S. state of Michigan. The seven-mile (11 km) river flows from Mullett Lake to Lake Huron, with its mouth in the city of Cheboygan. The river forms part of the Inland Waterway, a 38-mile-long (61 km) series of lakes and rivers that nearly connect Little Traverse Bay, a bay of Lake Michigan, with Lake Huron. The Black River is the largest tributary of the Cheboygan River.

== Description ==
The Cheboygan River descends 13 feet (4.0 m) in its 6-mile (9.7 km) length, from 594 feet (181 m) above sea level, the level of Mullett Lake, to Lake Huron at 581 feet (177 m) above sea level. The river and other sections of the Inland Waterway are made accessible by locks maintained by the United States Army Corps of Engineers.

The mouth of the Black River, 3.5 miles (5.6 km) south of Cheboygan, is a noted spot to look for bald eagles and other fish-eating raptors.

In Cheboygan itself, U.S. Highway 23 is carried across the Cheboygan River by the Cheboygan Bascule Bridge, a Scherzer rolling lift bridge built in 1940 and added to the National Register of Historic Places in December 1999. In 2009, Cheboygan city authorities built an elevated pedestrian bridge across the Cheboygan near its mouth.

The mouth of the Cheboygan River into Lake Huron is marked by the Cheboygan Crib Light.

The river forms the boundary between Benton Township and Inverness Township before flowing into the city of Cheboygan. The river forms the port of Cheboygan and serves as a dock for the ferry boat to Bois Blanc Island and the Coast Guard cutter Mackinaw.

== History ==
Cheboygan was founded as a lumbering town to cut timbers harvested from the Cheboygan River's drainage and floated down to mills (now mostly vanished) at the mouth of the river. Today, one of the biggest industries of the town and river of Cheboygan is pleasure boating up and down the river. The river is a key artery of the Inland Waterway, a pleasure-boat necklace of waterways in the northern section of Michigan's Lower Peninsula.

The river is the namesake for the city and county.

== See also ==
- List of bridges on the National Register of Historic Places in Michigan
