= Indian River (Mullett Lake) =

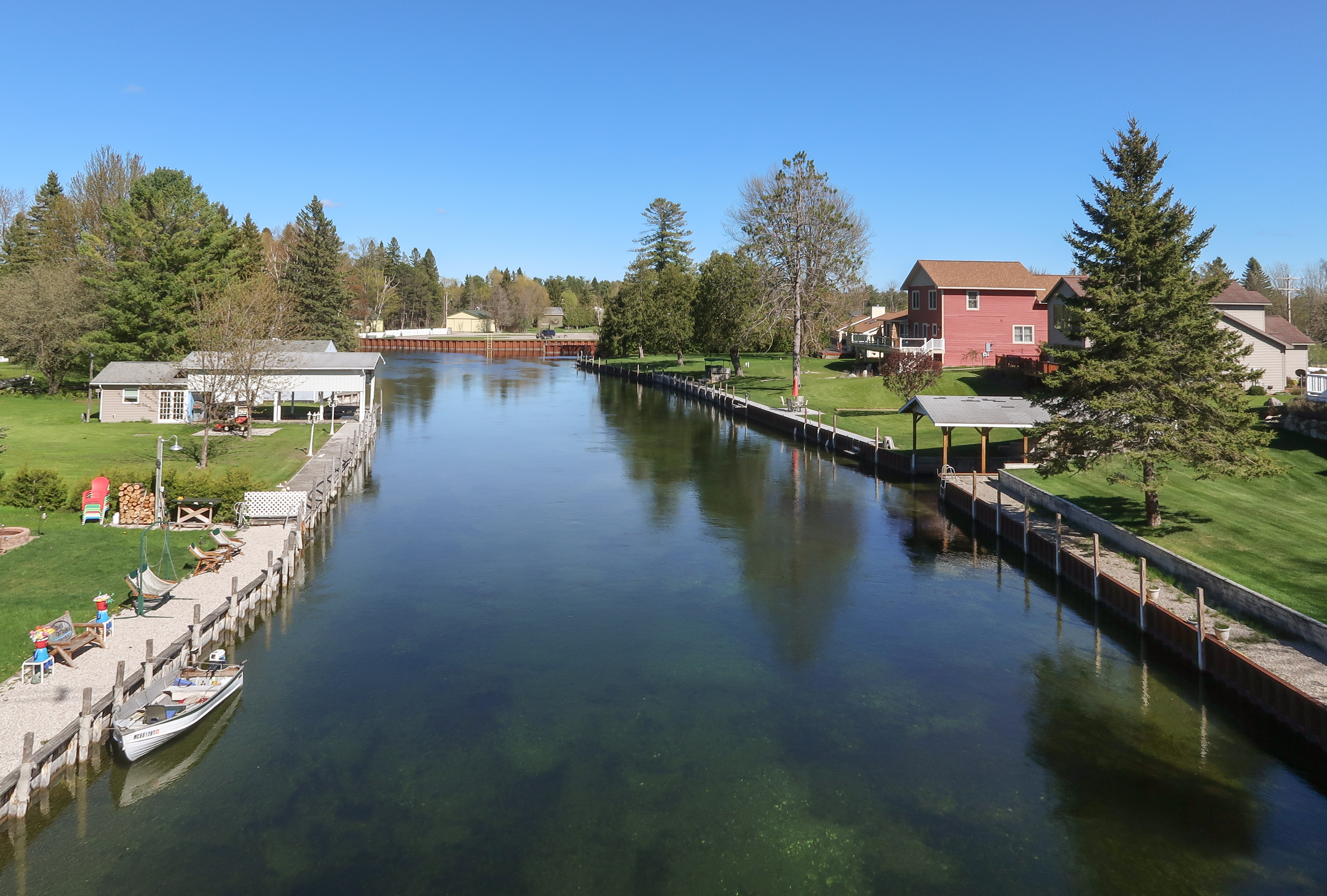
- The Indian River viewed from the North Central State Trail in the community of Indian River

Location
- Country: United States

Physical characteristics
- Source
  - location: Burt Lake, Cheboygan County, Michigan
  - elevation: 594 ft (181 m)
- Mouth
  - location: Mullett Lake, Cheboygan County, Michigan
  - elevation: 594 ft (181 m)

Indian River in the Lower Peninsula of Michigan is a 3.9-mile-long (6.3 km) waterway in Cheboygan County flowing from Burt Lake at 45°24′37″N 84°37′19″W to Mullett Lake at 45°27′05″N 84°34′39″W. The unincorporated community of Indian River is named after the river.

The river is part of the great Inland Waterway of Michigan, by which one can boat from Crooked Lake several miles east of Petoskey on the Little Traverse Bay of Lake Michigan across the northern tip of the lower peninsula's "mitten" to Cheboygan on Lake Huron.
