= Little Pigeon River =

Little Pigeon River is the name of several rivers in the United States:

- Little Pigeon River (Cheboygan County)
- Little Pigeon River (Indiana)
- Little Pigeon River (Michigan)
- Little Pigeon River (Mullett Lake)
- Little Pigeon River (Tennessee)

== See also ==
- Pigeon River (disambiguation)
