= Afton, Michigan =

- Unincorporated community
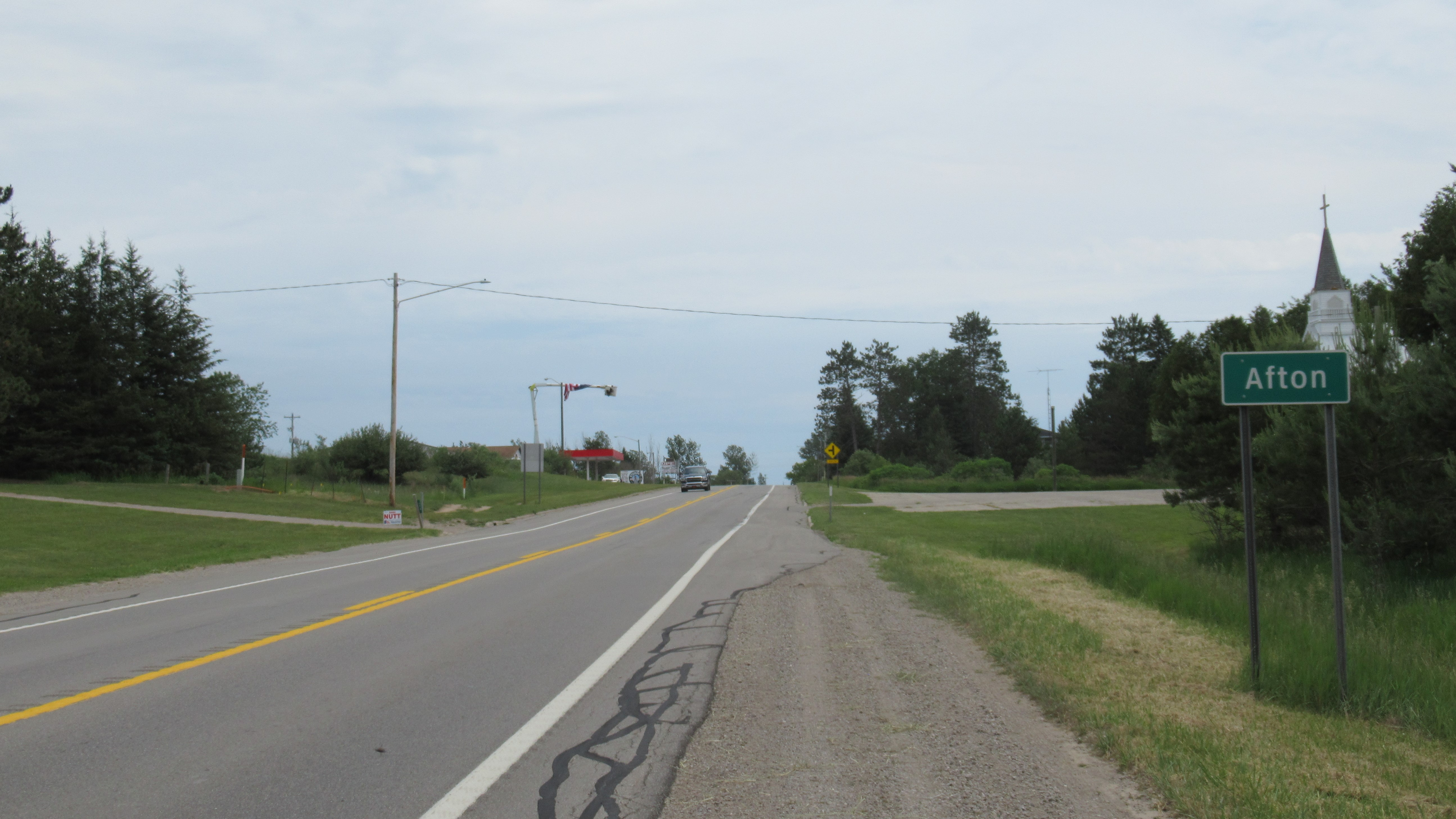
- Road signage looking east along M-68

- Location within the state of Michigan Location within the United States
- Coordinates: 45°22′26″N 84°29′48″W
- Country: United States
- State: Michigan
- County: Cheboygan
- Townships: Ellis and Koehler
- Settled: 1887
- Elevation: 787 ft (240 m)
- Time zone: UTC-5 (Eastern (EST))
  - Summer (DST): UTC-4 (EDT)
- ZIP code(s): 49705
- Area code: 989
- GNIS feature ID: 1617405

Afton is an unincorporated community in Cheboygan County in the U.S. state of Michigan. The community is located along M-68 at the boundary between Ellis Township to the south and Koehler Township to the north.

As an unincorporated community, Afton has no legally defined boundaries or population statistics of its own, but does have its own post office with the 49705 ZIP Code.

== Geography ==
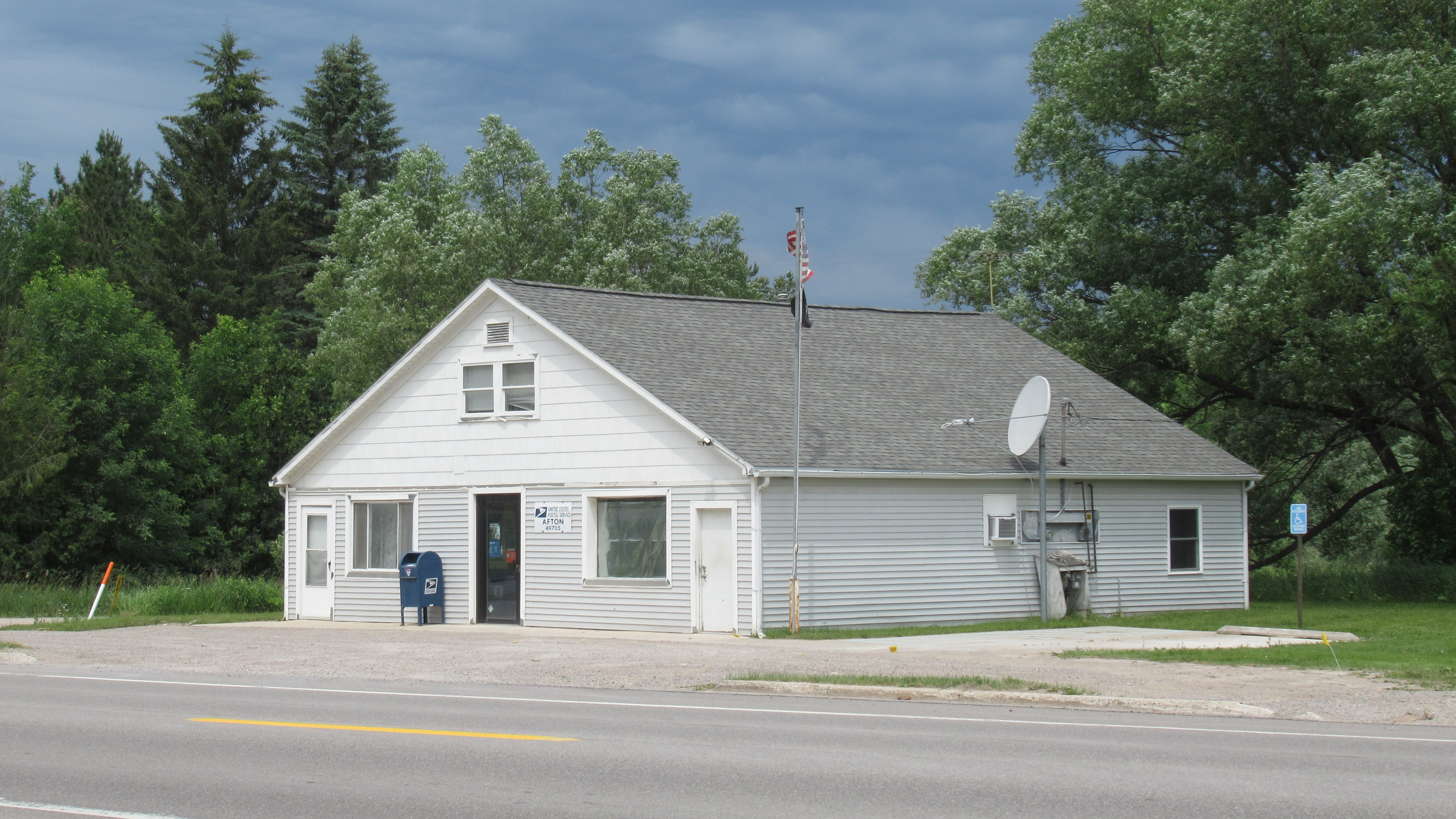
U.S. post office in Afton

Afton is a rural community in Cheboygan County in Northern Michigan. The community is centered along M-68. The highway at this point forms the boundary between Ellis Township to the south and Koehler Township to the north. Interstate 75 runs about 6.0 miles (9.7 km) to the west along M-68 and is directly accessible via exit 310 in Indian River.

Afton sits at an elevation of 787 feet (240 m) above sea level.

Other nearby unincorporated communities include Legrand to the northeast, Fingerboard Corner and Tower to the east, and Indian River to the northwest. The nearest incorporated municipalities are the village of Wolverine 11.5 miles (18.5 km) to the southwest and the city of Onaway 13.5 miles (21.7 km) to the east via roadway.

The community is located within the Pigeon River watershed region, which is a tributary of the large Mullett Lake to the northwest. The main branch of the Pigeon River flows to the west, while the middle branch of the Little Pigeon River flows to the east of the community. The smaller Kimberly Creek flows within closer proximity to the east of the community.

Afton contains its own post office located at 498 M-68 in the center of the community. The post office uses the 49705 ZIP Code, which serves the majority of Koehler Township, the eastern portion of Ellis Township, and the western portion of Walker Township. The ZIP Code also serves very small areas in western Waverly Township and Forest Township, as well as northern areas in Nunda Township.

The community is served by two separate public school districts. The areas to the south and west are served by Wolverine Community Schools, while the areas to the north and east are served by Indian Lakes Schools.

== History ==
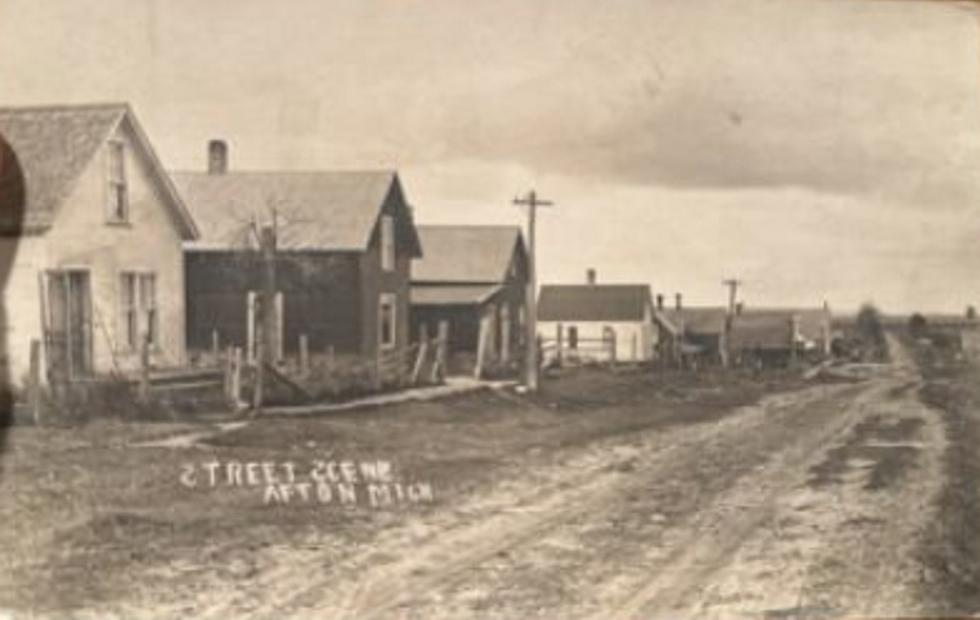
Historic photo of Afton around 1900

The community was first settled under the name Ellisville as early as 1887 when Patrick O'Connor opened the first lumber camp along the Pigeon River in Ellis Township. Cheboygan County, which was formally organized over 30 years earlier, was experiencing a sudden growth in development during the region's lumber exploitation in the 1880s. Many new communities were settled during this time, and the community of Ellisville was named after the township.

Many of the earliest settlers came from Canada and were of French and Irish heritage. A post office began operating under the name Ellisville on April 22, 1905 with storekeeper Fred Bartholomew serving as the first postmaster. Another local resident named MacPherson suggested changing the name to Afton, as he felt that the Pigeon River resembled the River Afton in his native Ayrshire County in Scotland. He originally wanted to change the name to Pigeon River (or Pidgeon River) but the name was deemed too common in the area, and the name Afton was chosen after a compromise. The post office was renamed Afton on February 12, 1906 and remains in operation. Around 1903, Afton was given a station along the Michigan Central Railroad and had a direct route south to the village of Wolverine and also connecting north to Mackinaw City. At the height of the community in the early 1900s, Afton contained several lumber mills, the railway depot, saloons, restaurants, raspberry farms, livestock farms, and stone quarries. Potato farming was also very prominent.

The area's first school, the Beebe School, opened around 1898 and enrolled 19 students. A new two-room schoolhouse was built in 1901 and become known as the Afton School. Several nearby schools later organized as Afton Agricultural Schools, which served students up until eighth grade and later tenth grade. Students had to leave Afton to continue their education. The district consolidated with Indian Lakes Schools in Indian River by the 1960s, after which the Beebe School burned down. The defunct Afton School was purchased and restored as a private residence, which still stands today.

As the railroad and lumbering industry declined, Afton benefited from the creation of U.S. Route 23 (US 23), which was commissioned in late-1926. This original route of US 23 provided a direct route from the village of Mackinaw City in the north all the way south to the state of Ohio. The highway passed slightly east of the center of the community. In 1940, US 23 was rerouted to run closer to the Lake Huron shoreline and no longer ran near Afton. The former stretch of US 23 running east of Afton would be turned over to state control and designated as a northerly extension of M-33. In July 1946, the main roadway through Afton would be designated as an eastern extension of M-68 in order to eliminate a gap in that highway's route. M-68 remains the main roadway through Afton, and it merges concurrent with M-33 slightly east of Afton in the community of Fingerboard Corner.

After the decline in the lumber industry, the Michigan Central Railroad decommissioned the rail lines in the area, and the lines were later removed by 1937; Afton is no longer served by any railroad. St. Monica’s Catholic Mission Church was established in Afton in 1938. It is part of the Roman Catholic Diocese of Gaylord and is one of the smallest operating Catholic churches in the state.
