= Little Pigeon River (Michigan) =

Little Pigeon River may refer to the following streams in the U.S. state of Michigan:

- Little Pigeon River (Mullett Lake), in Cheboygan County, flows north and west into Lake Mullett at Pigeon River Bay, at nearly the same place as the Pigeon River
  - North Branch Little Pigeon River, a tributary of the Little Pigeon River
  - Middle Branch Little Pigeon River, a tributary of the Little Pigeon River
- Little Pigeon River (Cheboygan County), rises in northern Otsego County and flows mostly north into Cheboygan County and into the Pigeon River
- Little Pigeon River, also known as the West Branch Pigeon River, a tributary of the Pigeon River in Huron County in the Thumb of Michigan
