= Nunda Township, Michigan =

- Civil township
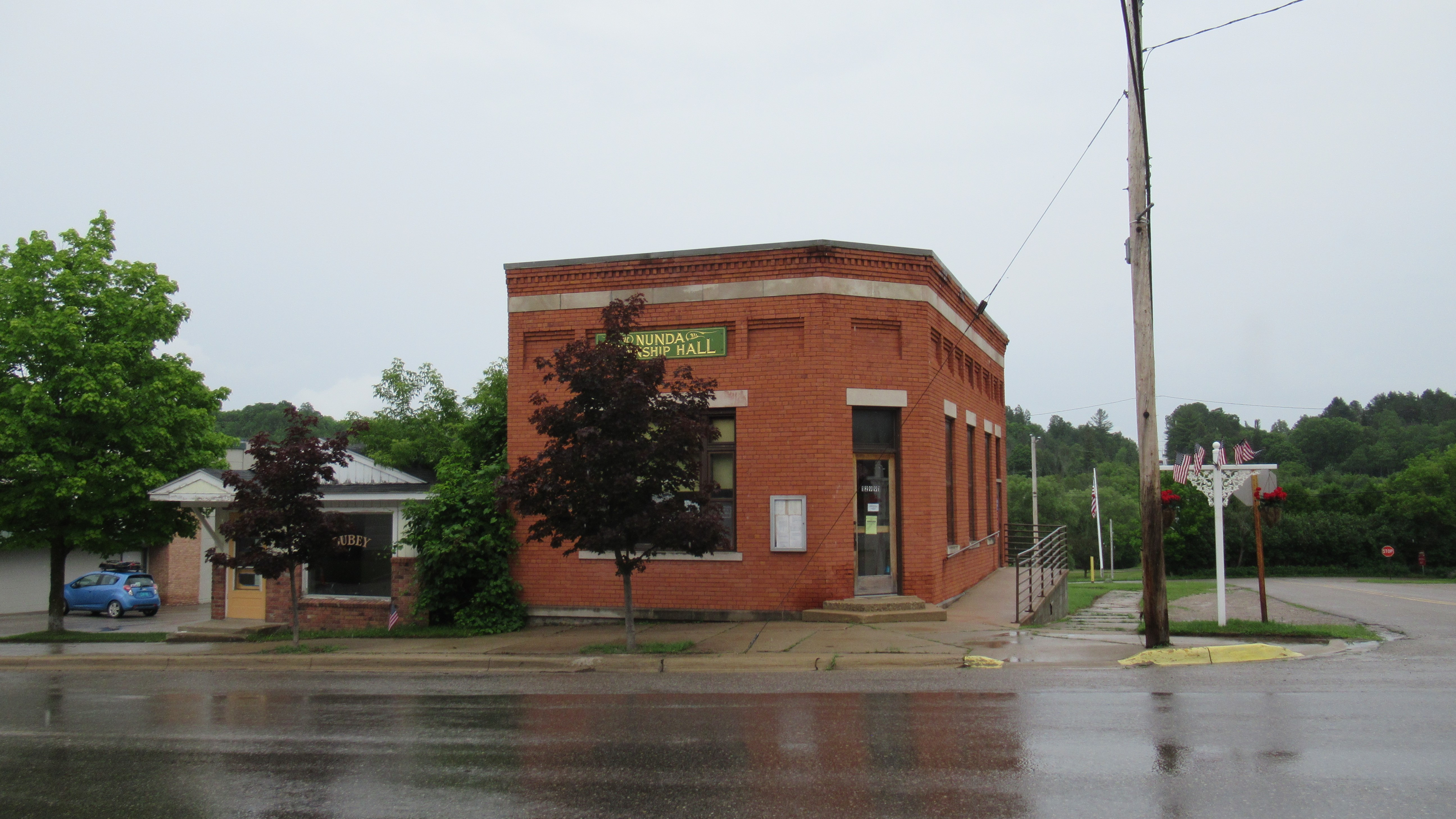
- Nunda Township Hall in Wolverine

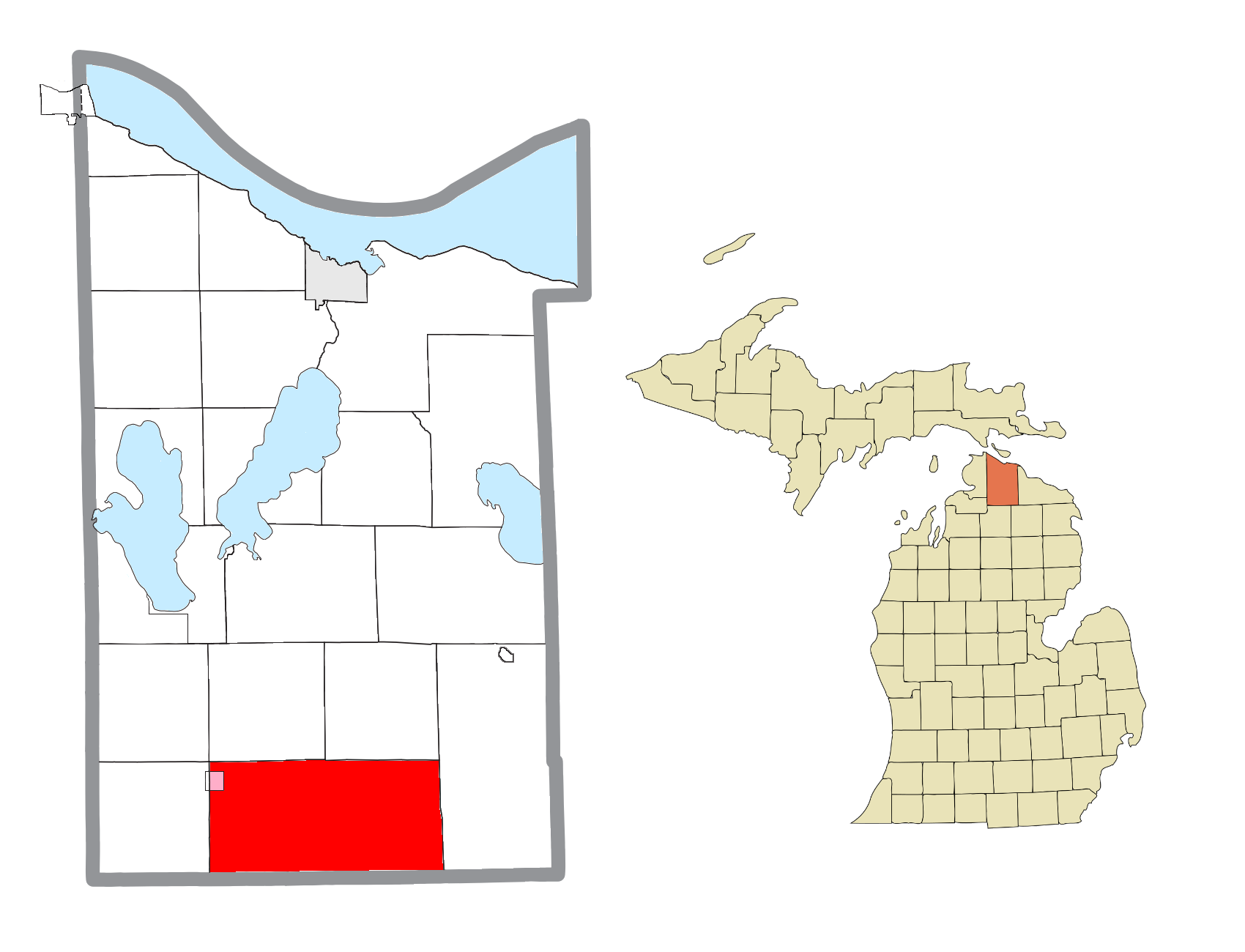
- Location within Cheboygan County (red) and an administered portion of the village of Wolverine (pink)

- Location within the state of Michigan Location within the United States
- Coordinates: 45°14′50″N 84°31′56″W
- Country: United States
- State: Michigan
- County: Cheboygan
- Established: 1877

Government
  - Supervisor: John Moore
  - Clerk: Theresa Moyer

Area
  - Total: 71.48 sq mi (185.13 km^{2})
  - Land: 70.26 sq mi (181.97 km^{2})
  - Water: 1.22 sq mi (3.16 km^{2})
- Elevation: 889 ft (271 m)

Population (2020)
  - Total: 1,195
  - Density: 17/sq mi (6.6/km^{2})
- Time zone: UTC-5 (Eastern (EST))
  - Summer (DST): UTC-4 (EDT)
- ZIP code(s): 49705 (Afton); 49795 (Vanderbilt); 49799 (Wolverine)
- Area code: 231
- FIPS code: 26-59500
- GNIS feature ID: 1626831

Nunda Township is a civil township of Cheboygan County in the U.S. state of Michigan. The population was 1,195 at the 2020 census.

== Geography ==
Nunda Township is located in southern Cheboygan County and is bordered by Otsego County to the south. The village of Wolverine is in the northwest part of the township. Interstate 75 passes through the western part of the township, with access from Exit 301 east of Wolverine.

According to the United States Census Bureau, the township has a total area of 71.5 square miles (185.1 km^{2}), of which 70.3 square miles (182.0 km^{2}) is land and 1.2 square miles (3.1 km^{2}), or 1.70%, is water. The Sturgeon River flows northward through the western part of the township, past the village of Wolverine, and the Pigeon River flows northward through the eastern part of the township.

== Demographics ==
As of the census of 2000, there were 925 people, 370 households, and 257 families residing in the township. The population density was 13.2 per square mile (5.1/km^{2}). There were 706 housing units at an average density of 10.0 per square mile (3.9/km^{2}). The racial makeup of the township was 97.08% White, 0.11% African American, 0.76% Native American, 0.11% from other races, and 1.95% from two or more races. Hispanic or Latino of any race were 0.32% of the population.

There were 370 households, out of which 29.2% had children under the age of 18 living with them, 54.6% were married couples living together, 10.0% had a female householder with no husband present, and 30.5% were non-families. 25.4% of all households were made up of individuals, and 8.9% had someone living alone who was 65 years of age or older. The average household size was 2.49 and the average family size was 2.96.

In the township the population was spread out, with 24.4% under the age of 18, 7.6% from 18 to 24, 28.2% from 25 to 44, 25.2% from 45 to 64, and 14.6% who were 65 years of age or older. The median age was 37 years. For every 100 females, there were 96.8 males. For every 100 females age 18 and over, there were 102.0 males.

The median income for a household in the township was $28,036, and the median income for a family was $31,406. Males had a median income of $28,750 versus $18,500 for females. The per capita income for the township was $12,802. About 9.1% of families and 14.0% of the population were below the poverty line, including 17.1% of those under age 18 and 4.7% of those age 65 or over.
