= Pigeon River (Michigan) =

Pigeon River may refer to the following streams in the U.S. state of Michigan:

- Pigeon River (Huron County, Michigan), in Huron County in the Thumb of Michigan, flowing west and north into the Saginaw Bay of Lake Huron
- Pigeon River (Mullett Lake), with headwaters in Otsego County, flowing mostly northward through Montmorency and Cheboygan counties into Mullett Lake
  - South Branch Pigeon River, a tributary of the Pigeon River in Otsego County
- Pigeon River (Ottawa County, Michigan), rising in Ottawa County's Olive Township, flowing east to west into Pigeon Lake and then Lake Michigan at Port Sheldon
- Pigeon River (St. Joseph River), rising in northern Indiana and flowing mostly westward through southern Michigan into the St. Joseph River near the Michigan-Indiana border northwest of Elkhart, Indiana

== See also ==
- Little Pigeon River (Michigan)
