= Little Pigeon River (Cheboygan County) =

Location
- Country: United States

Physical characteristics
- Source
  - location: Corwith Township, Otsego County, Michigan
- Mouth
  - location: Pigeon River, Cheboygan County, Michigan
  - elevation: 751 ft (229 m)

The Little Pigeon River is a 10.2-mile-long (16.4 km) stream in Otsego and Cheboygan counties in the U.S. state of Michigan.

The stream rises from the outflow of Mud Lake in northern Corwith Township, Otsego County at 45°11′23″N 84°30′07″W, It flows north and east to empty into the Pigeon River at 45°17′32″N 84°29′08″W in the southeastern corner of Walker Township in Cheboygan County.

== Tributaries ==
From the mouth:

- (left) MacAndrews Lake
- (right) Burrows Creek
- Mud Lake

== Protected areas ==
L. John & Helen Bishop Working Forest Reserve
