= Pigeon Creek =

Pigeon Creek may refer to:

- Pigeon Creek, Ohio, an unincorporated community
- Pigeon Creek, a creek running from Princeton, Indiana to the Ohio River in Evansville
- Pigeon Creek, a stream in Texas and Dent counties of southern Missouri
- Pigeon Creek, a stream in Ripley County, Missouri
- Pigeon Creek, the main tributary of the Tug Fork River in Mingo County, West Virginia
- Pigeon Creek, a tidal inlet on San Salvador Island, The Bahamas

== See also ==
- Pigeon River (disambiguation)
- Pigeon (disambiguation)
