= Wilmot Township, Michigan =

- Civil township
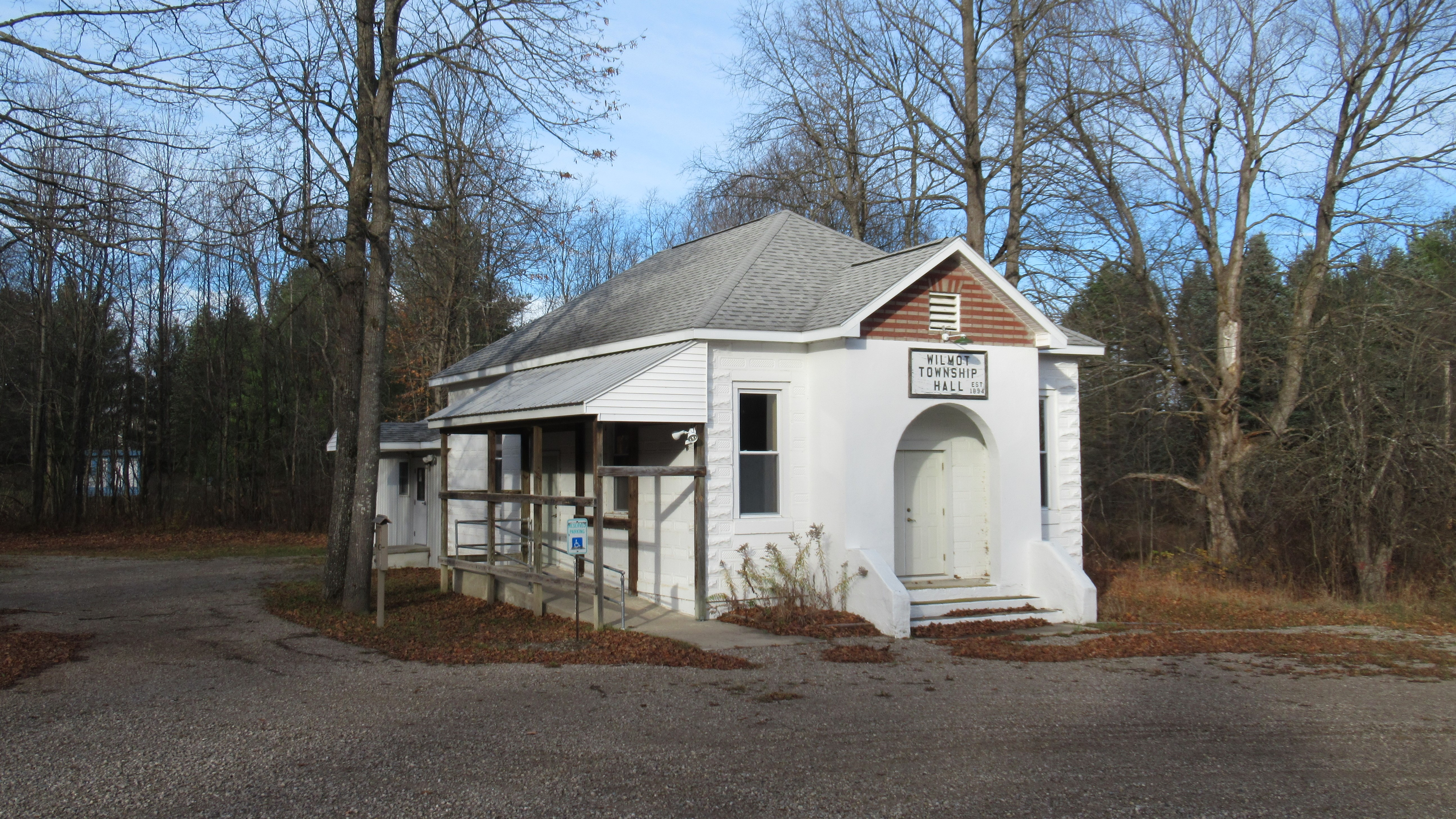
- Wilmot Township Hall

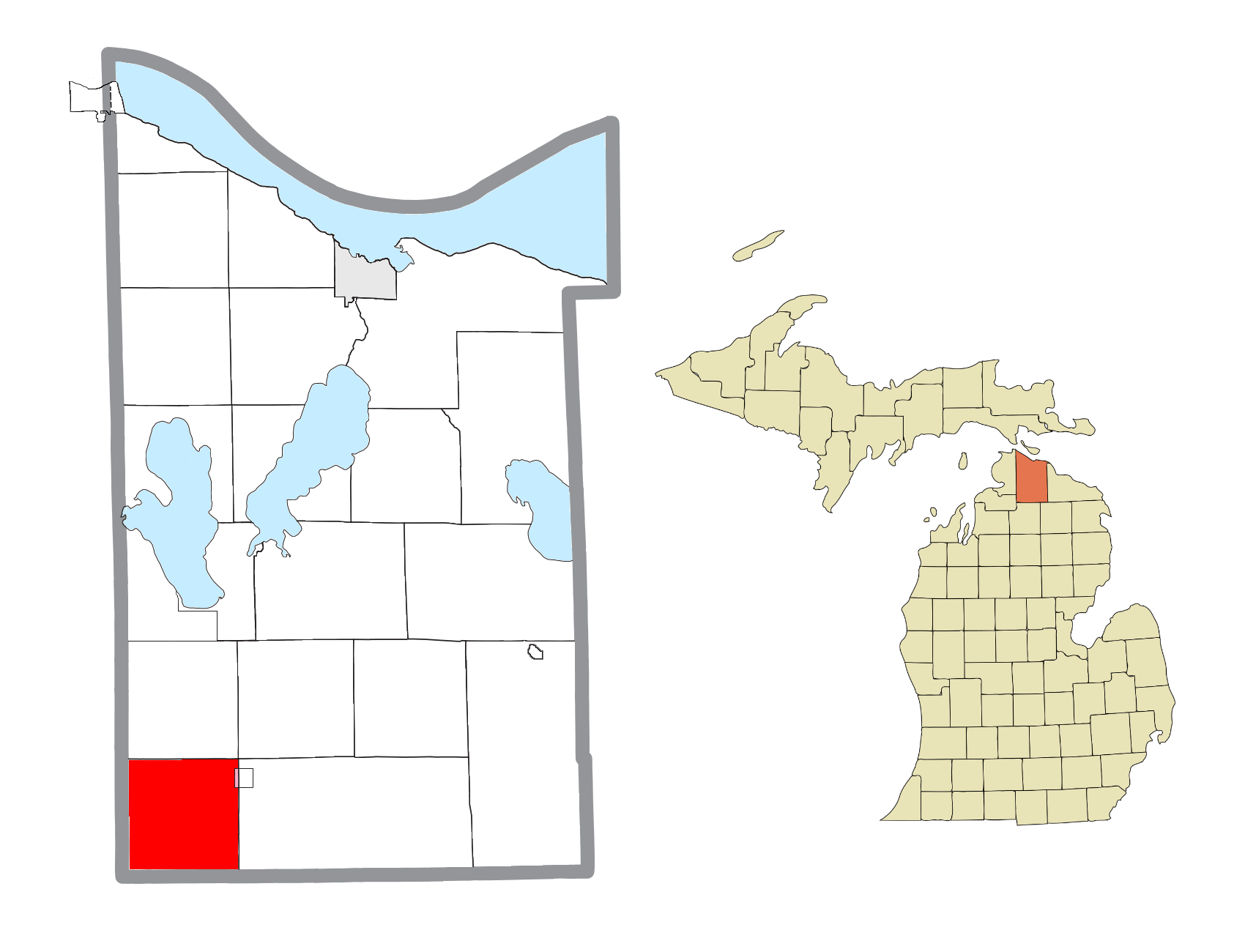
- Location within Cheboygan County (red) and an administered portion of the village of Wolverine (pink)

- Location within the state of Michigan Location within the United States
- Coordinates: 45°14′30″N 84°39′55″W
- Country: United States
- State: Michigan
- County: Cheboygan
- Established: 1894

Government
  - Supervisor: Tierney Farhat
  - Clerk: Cary Ford

Area
  - Total: 36.01 sq mi (93.27 km^{2})
  - Land: 35.76 sq mi (92.62 km^{2})
  - Water: 0.25 sq mi (0.65 km^{2})
- Elevation: 896 ft (273 m)

Population (2020)
  - Total: 822
  - Density: 23/sq mi (8.9/km^{2})
- Time zone: UTC-5 (Eastern (EST))
  - Summer (DST): UTC-4 (EDT)
- ZIP code(s): 49713 (Boyne Falls); 49795 (Vanderbilt); 49799 (Wolverine)
- Area code: 231
- FIPS code: 26-87640
- GNIS feature ID: 1627276

Wilmot Township is a civil township of Cheboygan County in the U.S. state of Michigan. The population was 822 at the 2020 census.

== Geography ==
Wilmot Township is located in the southwestern corner of Cheboygan County and is bordered by Charlevoix County to the west and Otsego County to the south. A small portion of the village of Wolverine is in the northeast part of the township. Interstate 75 crosses the southeast corner of the township but has no direct access.

According to the United States Census Bureau, the township has a total area of 36.0 square miles (93.3 km^{2}), of which 35.8 square miles (92.6 km^{2}) is land and 0.23 square miles (0.6 km^{2}), or 0.68%, is water.

== Demographics ==
As of the census of 2000, there were 826 people, 295 households, and 222 families residing in the township. The population density was 23.1 per square mile (8.9/km^{2}). There were 464 housing units at an average density of 13.0 per square mile (5.0/km^{2}). The racial makeup of the township was 95.52% White, 3.15% Native American, 0.12% from other races, and 1.21% from two or more races. Hispanic or Latino of any race were 0.73% of the population.

There were 295 households, out of which 38.3% had children under the age of 18 living with them, 63.4% were married couples living together, 7.1% had a female householder with no husband present, and 24.7% were non-families. 90.6 of all households were made up of individuals, and 6.8% had someone living alone who was 65 years of age or older. The average household size was 2.80 and the average family size was 3.19.

In the township the population was spread out, with 30.9% under the age of 18, 6.8% from 18 to 24, 30.0% from 25 to 44, 23.1% from 45 to 64, and 9.2% who were 65 years of age or older. The median age was 34 years. For every 100 females, there were 106.0 males. For every 100 females age 18 and over, there were 101.1 males.

The median income for a household in the township was $32,500, and the median income for a family was $36,250. Males had a median income of $24,625 versus $18,438 for females. The per capita income for the township was $13,625. About 9.7% of families and 14.7% of the population were below the poverty line, including 23.3% of those under age 18 and 5.1% of those age 65 or over.
