= Ellis Township, Michigan =

- Civil township
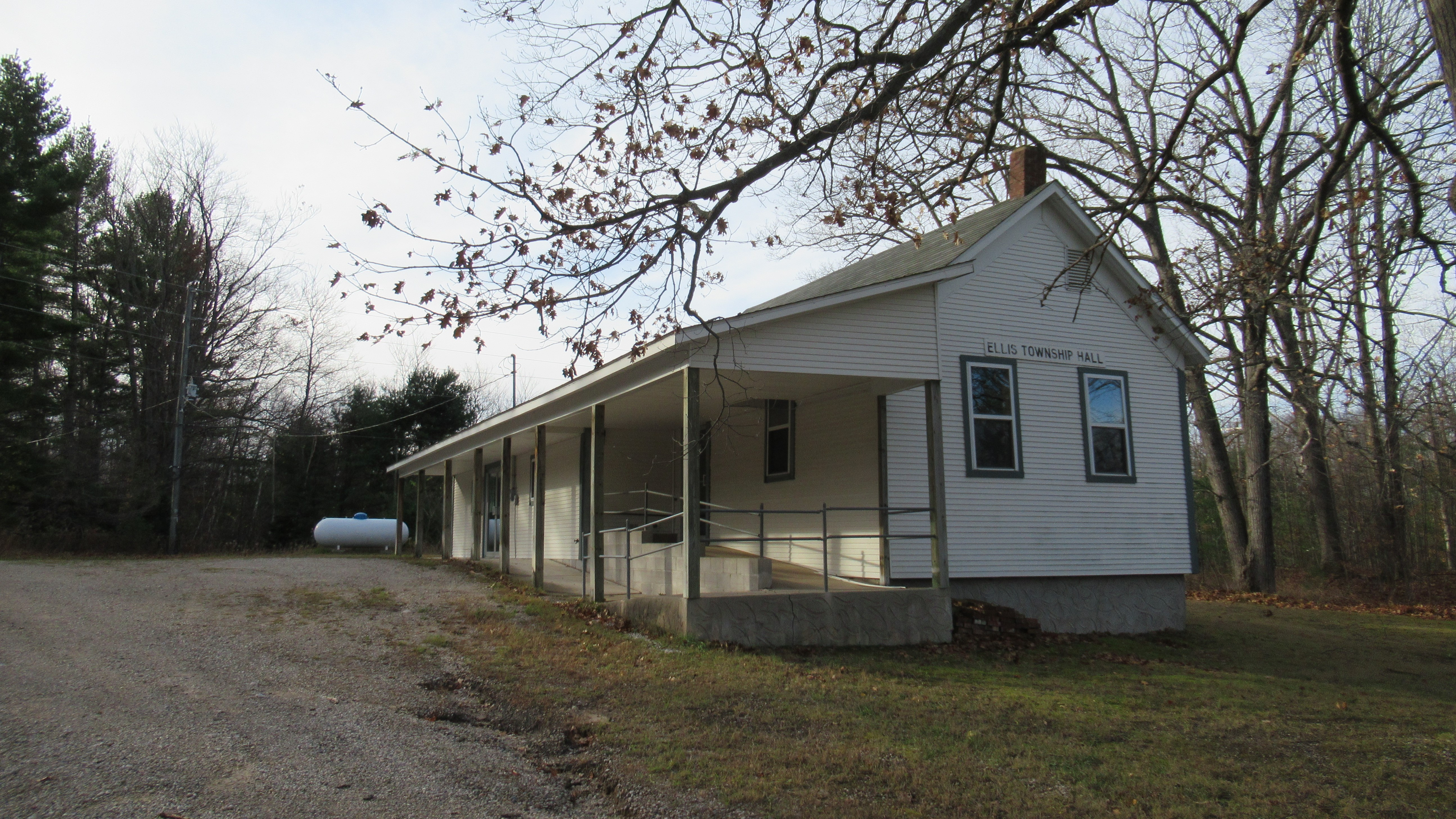
- Ellis Township Hall

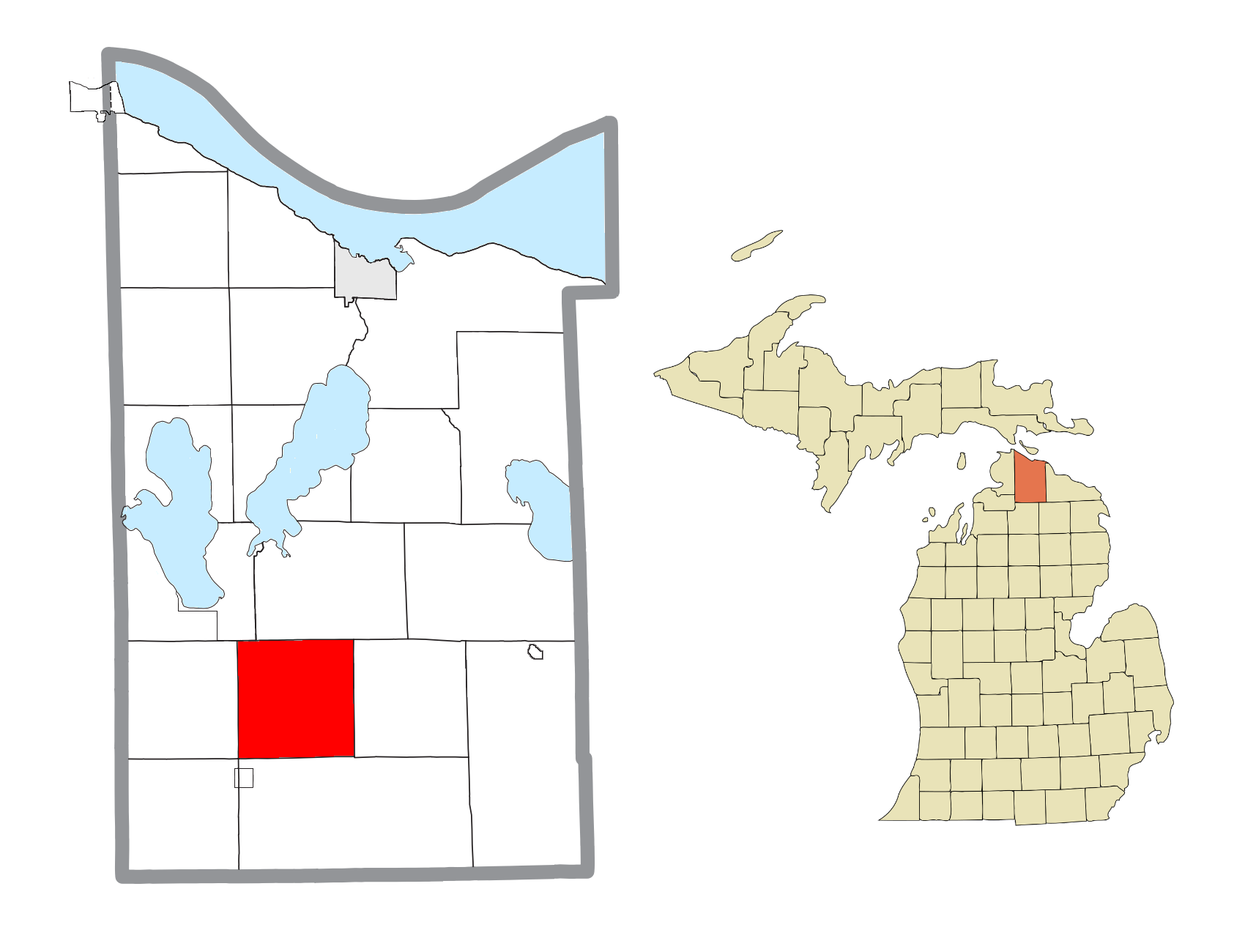
- Location within Cheboygan County

- Location within the state of Michigan Location within the United States
- Coordinates: 45°19′23″N 84°33′07″W
- Country: United States
- State: Michigan
- County: Cheboygan
- Established: 1882

Government
  - Supervisor: Fulford Lapeer
  - Clerk: Sheryl Hilliker

Area
  - Total: 35.63 sq mi (92.28 km^{2})
  - Land: 35.57 sq mi (92.13 km^{2})
  - Water: 0.062 sq mi (0.16 km^{2})
- Elevation: 869 ft (265 m)

Population (2020)
  - Total: 557
  - Density: 15.7/sq mi (6.1/km^{2})
- Time zone: UTC-5 (Eastern (EST))
  - Summer (DST): UTC-4 (EDT)
- ZIP code(s): 49705 (Afton); 49749 (Indian River); 49799 (Wolverine)
- Area code: 231
- FIPS code: 26-25400
- GNIS feature ID: 1626229

Ellis Township is a civil township of Cheboygan County in the U.S. state of Michigan. The population was 557 at the 2020 census.

== Communities ==
- Afton is an unincorporated community east of the Pigeon River at 45°22′26″N 84°29′48″W. It is on M-68, about 6 miles (10 km) east of I-75 at Indian River and about 3 miles (5 km) west of M-33 (which is then 20 miles (32 km) south of Cheboygan). The ZIP code is 49705. Afton began as a lumber camp in 1887.

== Geography ==
According to the United States Census Bureau, the township has a total area of 35.6 square miles (92.3 km^{2}), of which 35.6 square miles (92.1 km^{2}) is land and 0.08 square miles (0.2 km^{2}), or 0.17%, is water.

== Demographics ==
As of the census of 2000, there were 519 people, 190 households, and 149 families residing in the township. The population density was 14.6 inhabitants per square mile (5.6/km^{2}). There were 329 housing units at an average density of 9.2 per square mile (3.6/km^{2}). The racial makeup of the township was 96.92% White, 0.19% African American, 1.16% Native American, 0.19% Asian, and 1.54% from two or more races. Hispanic or Latino people of any race were 0.77% of the population.

There were 190 households, out of which 33.2% had children under the age of 18 living with them, 67.9% were married couples living together, 6.8% had a female householder with no husband present, and 21.1% were non-families. 16.3% of all households were made up of individuals, and 7.9% had someone living alone who was 65 years of age or older. The average household size was 2.73 and the average family size was 3.05.

In the township the population was spread out, with 26.0% under the age of 18, 5.6% from 18 to 24, 29.1% from 25 to 44, 25.0% from 45 to 64, and 14.3% who were 65 years of age or older. The median age was 39 years. For every 100 females, there were 95.8 males. For every 100 females age 18 and over, there were 100.0 males.

The median income for a household in the township was $31,131, and the median income for a family was $32,206. Males had a median income of $29,375 versus $22,500 for females. The per capita income for the township was $15,525. About 5.8% of families and 13.3% of the population were below the poverty line, including 20.9% of those under age 18 and none of those age 65 or over.
