= Pigeon River =

Pigeon River may refer to:

Rivers

- Pigeon River (Minnesota–Ontario), between Minnesota, United States, and Ontario, Canada
- Pigeon River (Manitoba), a tributary of Lake Winnipeg, Canada
- One of four rivers named the Pigeon River (Michigan) in Michigan, United States
- Pigeon River (Tennessee–North Carolina), United States
- Pigeon River (Mississippi River tributary), Minnesota, United States

Places

- Pigeon River, Minnesota, United States
- Pigeon River, a rural community in Neebing, Ontario, Canada
- Pigeon River 13A, a reserve of the Berens River First Nation, Manitoba, Canada

== See also ==
- Pigeon Creek (disambiguation)
- Little Pigeon River (disambiguation)
- Pigeon (disambiguation)
