= Fingerboard Corner, Michigan =

- Unincorporated community
- Location within the state of Michigan
- Coordinates: 45°22′25″N 84°27′01″W
- Country: United States
- State: Michigan
- County: Cheboygan
- Township: Koehler, Walker
- Elevation: 899 ft (274 m)
- Time zone: UTC-5 (Eastern (EST))
  - Summer (DST): UTC-4 (EDT)
- Area code: 231
- GNIS feature ID: 620159

Fingerboard Corner (also The Finger Board Corner) is an unincorporated community in Cheboygan County, Michigan, United States.
