= Wolverine, Michigan =

- Village
- Village of Wolverine
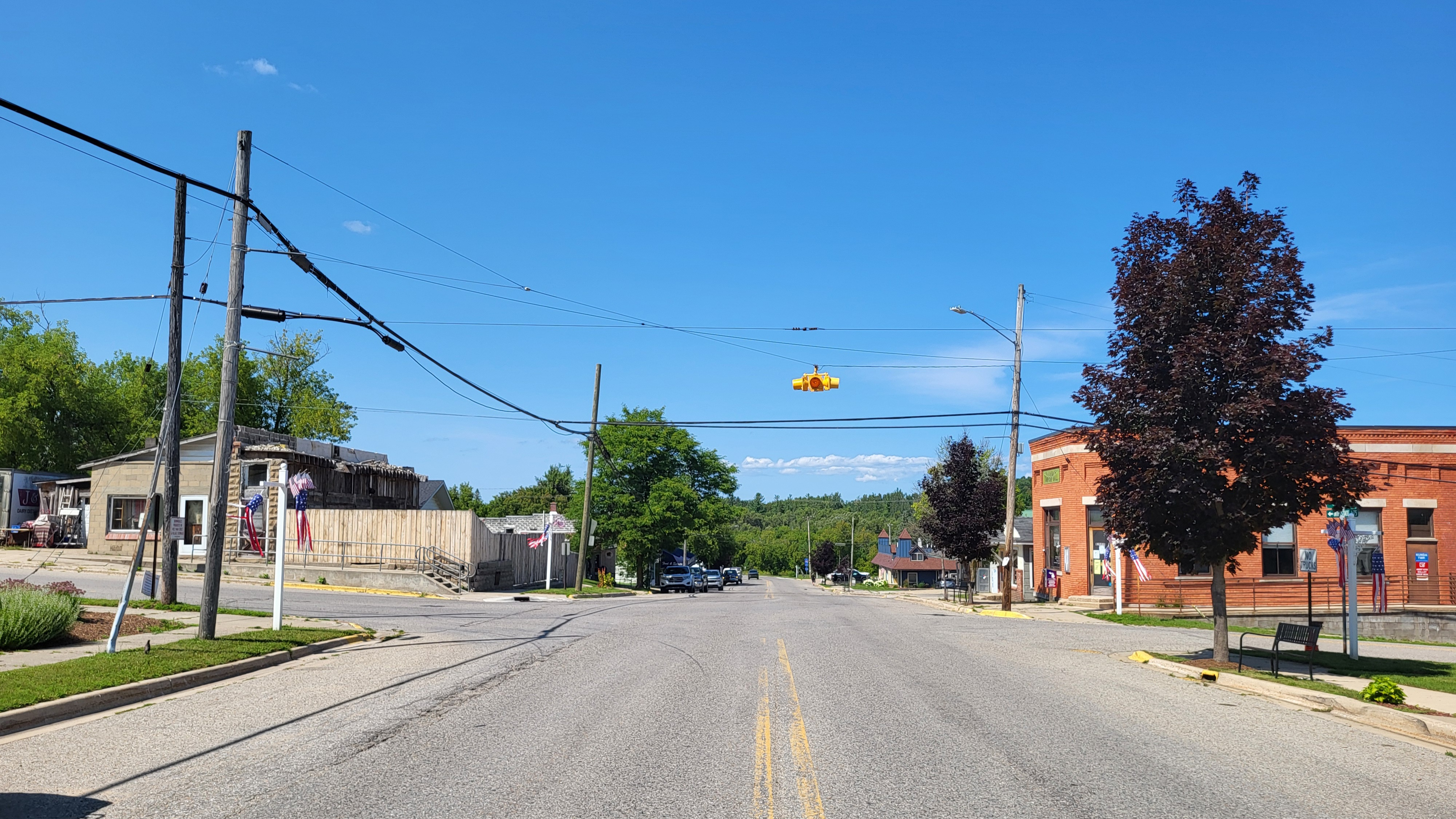
- Main Street and South Straits Highway
- Motto: This is Sturgeon River Country
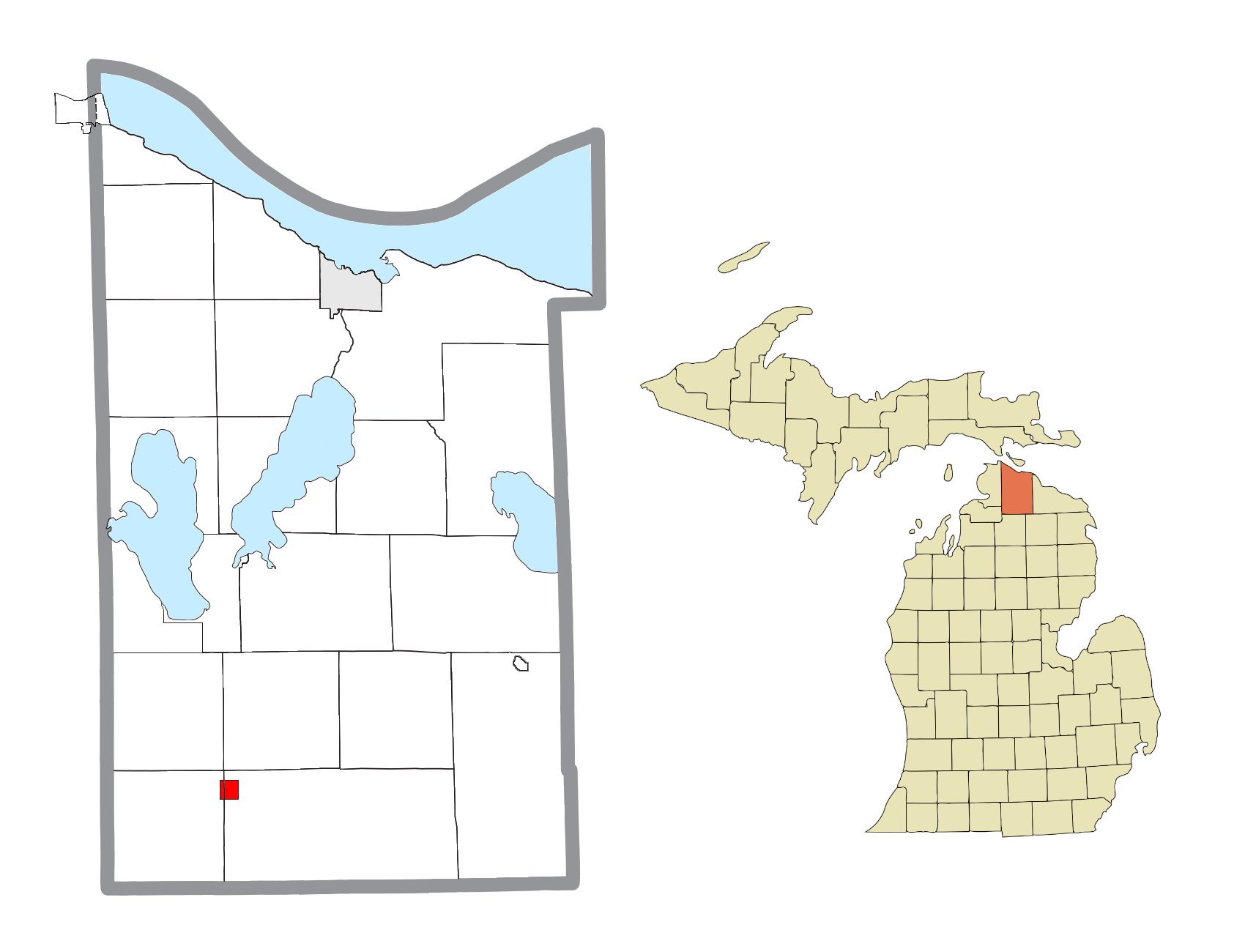
- Location within Cheboygan County

- Location within the state of Michigan Location within the United States
- Coordinates: 45°16′21″N 84°36′21″W
- Country: United States
- State: Michigan
- County: Cheboygan
- Townships: Nunda and Wilmot
- Settled: 1874
- Incorporated: 1903

Government
  - Type: Village council
  - Manager: Ralph Ochs
  - Clerk: Deb Johnston
  - Treasurer: Laurie Holden

Area
  - Total: 0.99 sq mi (2.56 km^{2})
  - Land: 0.98 sq mi (2.54 km^{2})
  - Water: 0.0077 sq mi (0.02 km^{2})
- Elevation: 817 ft (249 m)

Population (2020)
  - Total: 309
  - Density: 315.31/sq mi (121.74/km^{2})
- Time zone: UTC-5 (Eastern (EST))
  - Summer (DST): UTC-4 (EDT)
- ZIP code(s): 49799
- Area code: 231
- FIPS code: 26-88240
- GNIS feature ID: 1616712
- Website: Official website

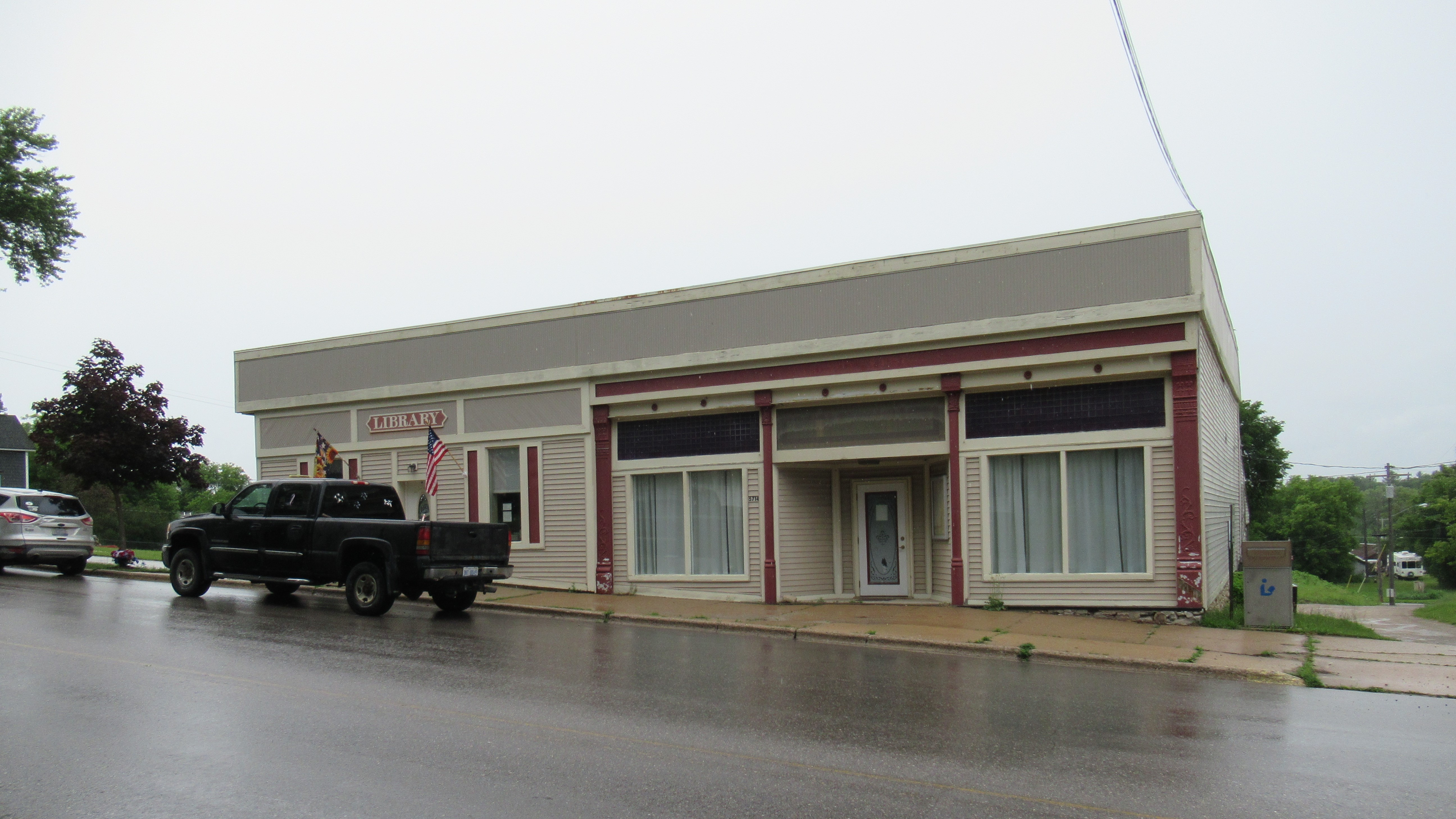
Village offices and library

Wolverine is a village in Cheboygan County in the U.S. state of Michigan. The population was 309 at the 2020 census.

The village is mostly located within Nunda Township with a small portion extending west into Wilmot Township. It is located directly west of Interstate 75 about 40 miles (64.4 km) south of the Mackinac Bridge.

== History ==
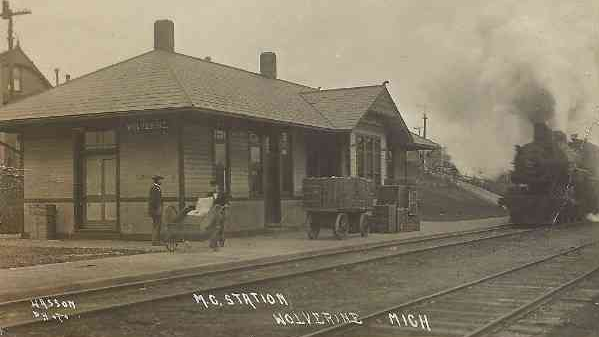
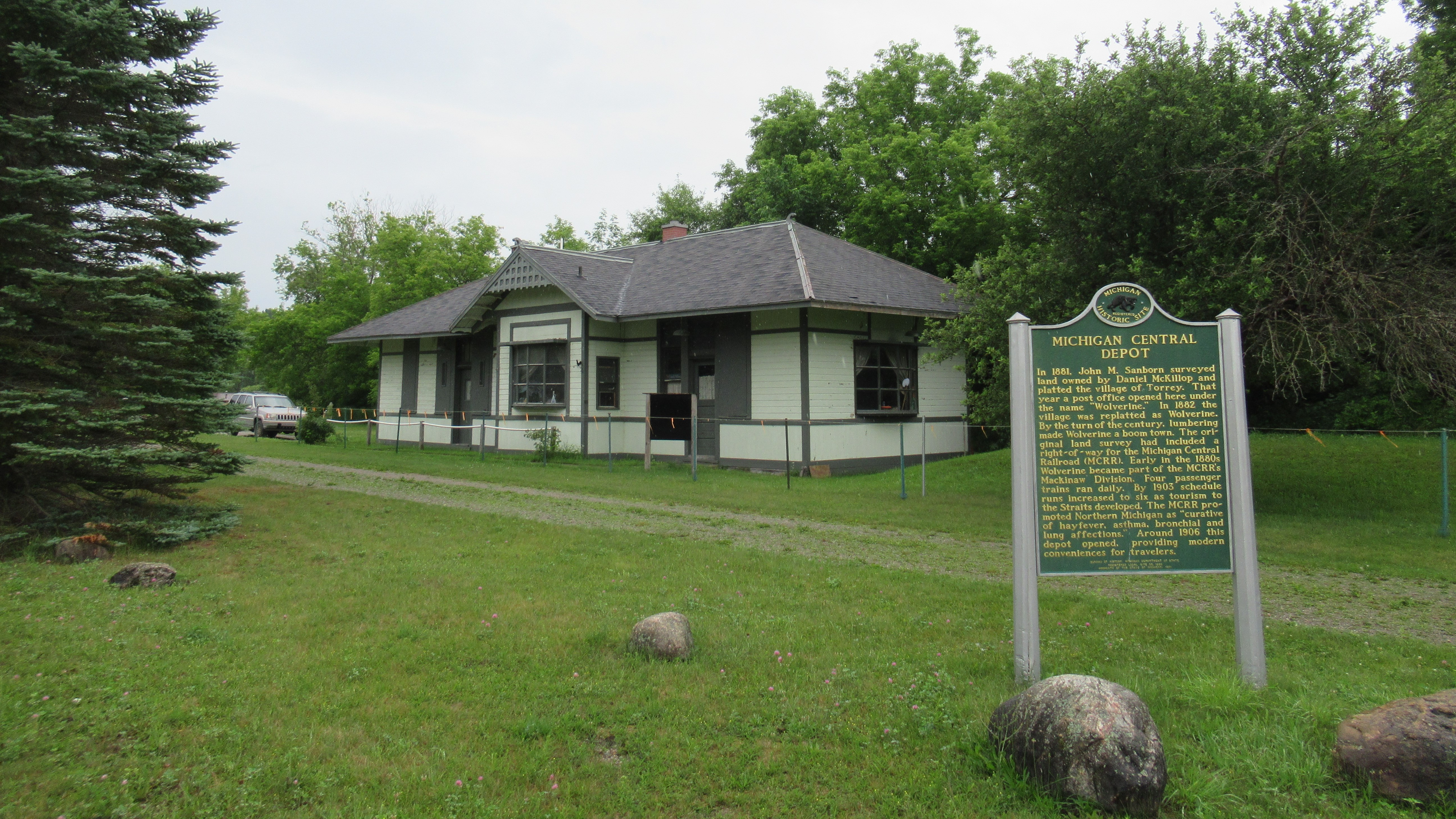
Michigan Central Depot in Wolverine in 1920 (top) and 2021 (bottom)

The area was originally settled by Jacob Shook and his family as early as 1874. The community was named "Torrey" when George Richards settled in the area soon after. Venturing to the area was difficult, as the nearest railway line ended in Gaylord about 20 miles (32.2 km) to the south. Richards was a frequent traveler back and forth to Gaylord for mail and supplies, often staying mid-route at Vanderbilt. He requested a closer post office, which was granted under the name Wolverine in late 1880.

The post office was first established on January 3, 1881, and continues to remain in operation. Richards served as the first postmaster. As an early settler of the community, he helped organize and operate the local school district and was also a real estate dealer and lumberman. He was elected to the Michigan House of Representatives in 1903.

In 1881, Wolverine recorded 18 residents. Soon after, the Jackson, Lansing, and Saginaw Railroad Company received a deed and began railway construction at the community of Trowbridge about 5 miles (8.0 km) to the southeast. By 1891, the population of Wolverine increased to about 1,000 residents, who mainly worked for the railway and lumbering industry. The community incorporated as a village in 1903. By 1905, the area population was around 1,800. When the lumber industry declined by the 1930s, the population drastically decreased as many people left Wolverine.

== Geography ==
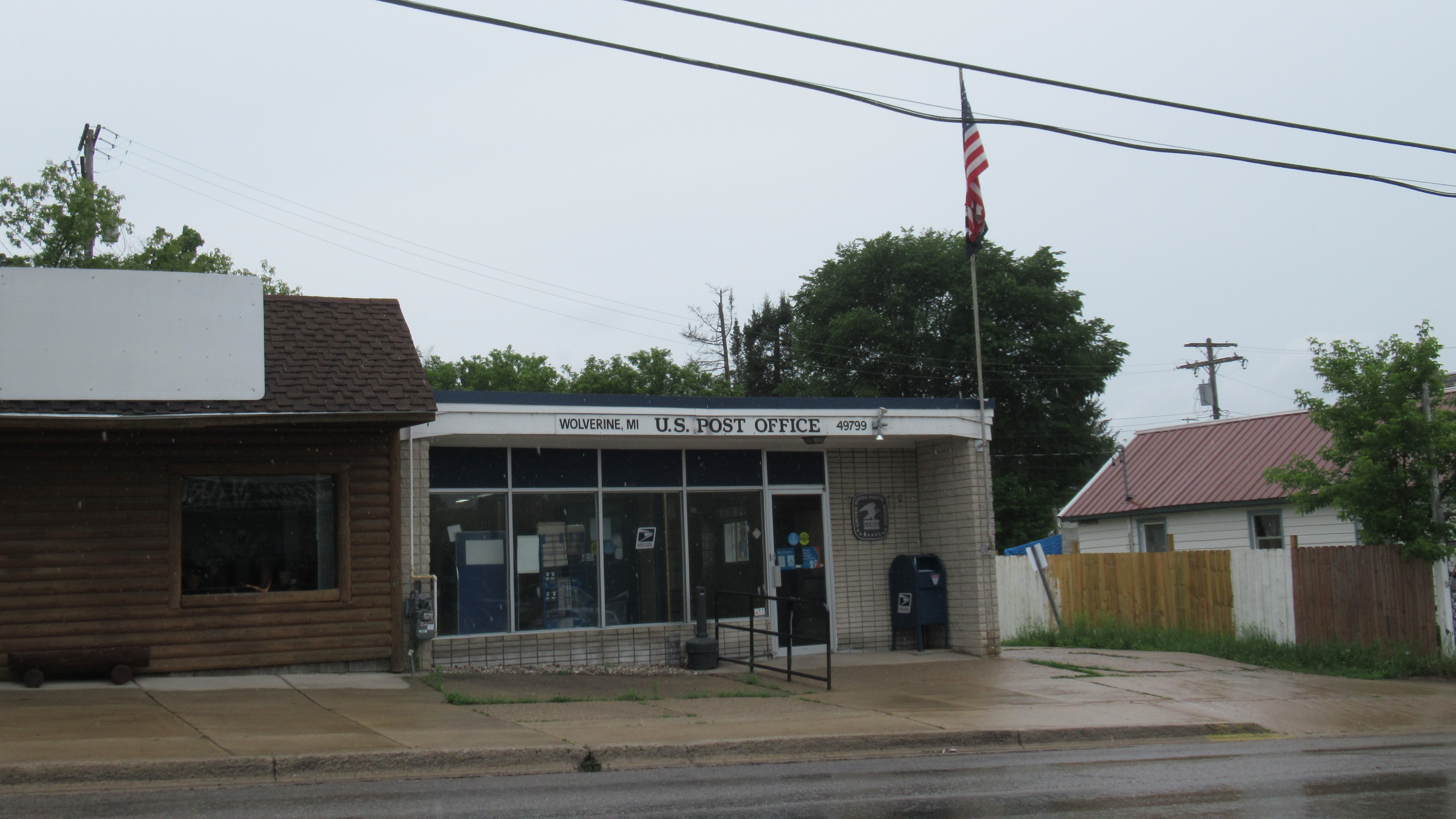
U.S. Post Office in Wolverine

According to the U.S. Census Bureau, the village has a total area of 0.99 square miles (2.56 km^{2}), of which 0.98 square miles (2.54 km^{2}) is land and 0.01 square miles (0.03 km^{2}) (1.01%) is water.

Wolverine is situated on the Sturgeon River where the west branch joins the main branch at 45°16′24″N 84°36′16″W.

Wolverine contains its own post office using the 49799 ZIP Code, which is the highest numeric ZIP Code in the state's Lower Peninsula. The Wolverine post office serves a much larger area that includes most of Nunda Township and Wilmot Township, as well as smaller portions of Ellis Township and Mentor Township. The post office also serves a very small portion of Corwith Township in Otsego County to the south, as well as very small portions of Chandler Township in Charlevoix County and Springvale Township in Emmet County to the west.

== Demographics ==
Historical population
Census	Pop.	Note	%±
1910	794		—
1920	413		−48.0%
1930	300		−27.4%
1940	257		−14.3%
1950	318		23.7%
1960	292		−8.2%
1970	303		3.8%
1980	364		20.1%
1990	283		−22.3%
2000	359		26.9%
2010	244		−32.0%
2020	309		26.6%
U.S. Decennial Census

=== 2010 census ===
As of the census of 2010, there were 244 people, 94 households, and 64 families residing in the village. The population density was 249.0 inhabitants per square mile (96.1/km^{2}). There were 146 housing units at an average density of 149.0 per square mile (57.5/km^{2}). The racial makeup of the village was 94.3% White, 0.8% Asian, and 4.9% from two or more races. Hispanic or Latino of any race were 1.2% of the population.

There were 94 households, of which 37.2% had children under the age of 18 living with them, 51.1% were married couples living together, 12.8% had a female householder with no husband present, 4.3% had a male householder with no wife present, and 31.9% were non-families. 25.5% of all households were made up of individuals, and 14.9% had someone living alone who was 65 years of age or older. The average household size was 2.60 and the average family size was 3.14.

The median age in the village was 40.3 years. 27% of residents were under the age of 18; 4.9% were between the ages of 18 and 24; 23.7% were from 25 to 44; 28.7% were from 45 to 64; and 15.6% were 65 years of age or older. The gender makeup of the village was 46.3% male and 53.7% female.

=== 2000 census ===
As of the census of 2000, there were 359 people, 131 households, and 91 families residing in the village. The population density was 403.5 inhabitants per square mile (155.8/km^{2}). There were 158 housing units at an average density of 177.6 per square mile (68.6/km^{2}). The racial makeup of the village was 98.33% White and 1.67% Native American. Hispanic or Latino of any race were 0.28% of the population.

There were 131 households, out of which 35.1% had children under the age of 18 living with them, 46.6% were married couples living together, 16.8% had a female householder with no husband present, and 29.8% were non-families. 25.2% of all households were made up of individuals, and 7.6% had someone living alone who was 65 years of age or older. The average household size was 2.74 and the average family size was 3.27.

In the village, the population was spread out, with 30.9% under the age of 18, 8.9% from 18 to 24, 27.6% from 25 to 44, 22.3% from 45 to 64, and 10.3% who were 65 years of age or older. The median age was 32 years. For every 100 females, there were 84.1 males. For every 100 females age 18 and over, there were 87.9 males.

The median income for a household in the village was $22,813, and the median income for a family was $26,500. Males had a median income of $27,500 versus $17,250 for females. The per capita income for the village was $9,612. About 14.4% of families and 20.4% of the population were below the poverty line, including 23.6% of those under age 18 and 2.3% of those age 65 or over.
