= Little Pigeon River (Mullett Lake) =

Location
- Country: United States

Physical characteristics
- Source
  - location: Koehler Township, Cheboygan County, Michigan
- Mouth
  - location: Mullett Lake, Cheboygan County, Michigan
  - elevation: 600 ft (180 m)
- Length: 6.0 mi (9.7 km)

The Little Pigeon River is a 6.0-mile-long (9.7 km) stream in Cheboygan County in the U.S. state of Michigan.

The stream rises in Koehler Township at 45°23′13″N 84°29′56″W, out of a marshy area fed by Kimberly Creek approximately one mile north of the community of Afton.

The stream flows mostly north and west into Mullett Lake at Pigeon River Bay at 45°26′29″N 84°33′21″W, which is nearly the same mouth as that of the Pigeon River. The course of the Little Pigeon River runs within approximately 2 miles (3.2 km) or less of the Pigeon River for most of its length.

== Tributaries ==
From the mouth:

- (left) Silver Creek
  - Silver Lake
- (left) North Branch Little Pigeon River
  - (right) Morrow Creek
- (left) Middle Branch Little Pigeon River
- Kimberly Creek
