= Pigeon Creek (South Fork Buffalo Creek tributary) =

Stream in the American state of Missouri

Coordinates: 36.693113°N 91.033184°W

Pigeon Creek is a stream in Ripley County in the U.S. state of Missouri. It is a tributary of South Fork Buffalo Creek.

Pigeon Creek, historically called "Pigeon Branch", was so named on account of the abundance of wild pigeons in the area.

== See also ==
- List of rivers of Missouri
