= Corwith Township, Michigan =

- Civil township
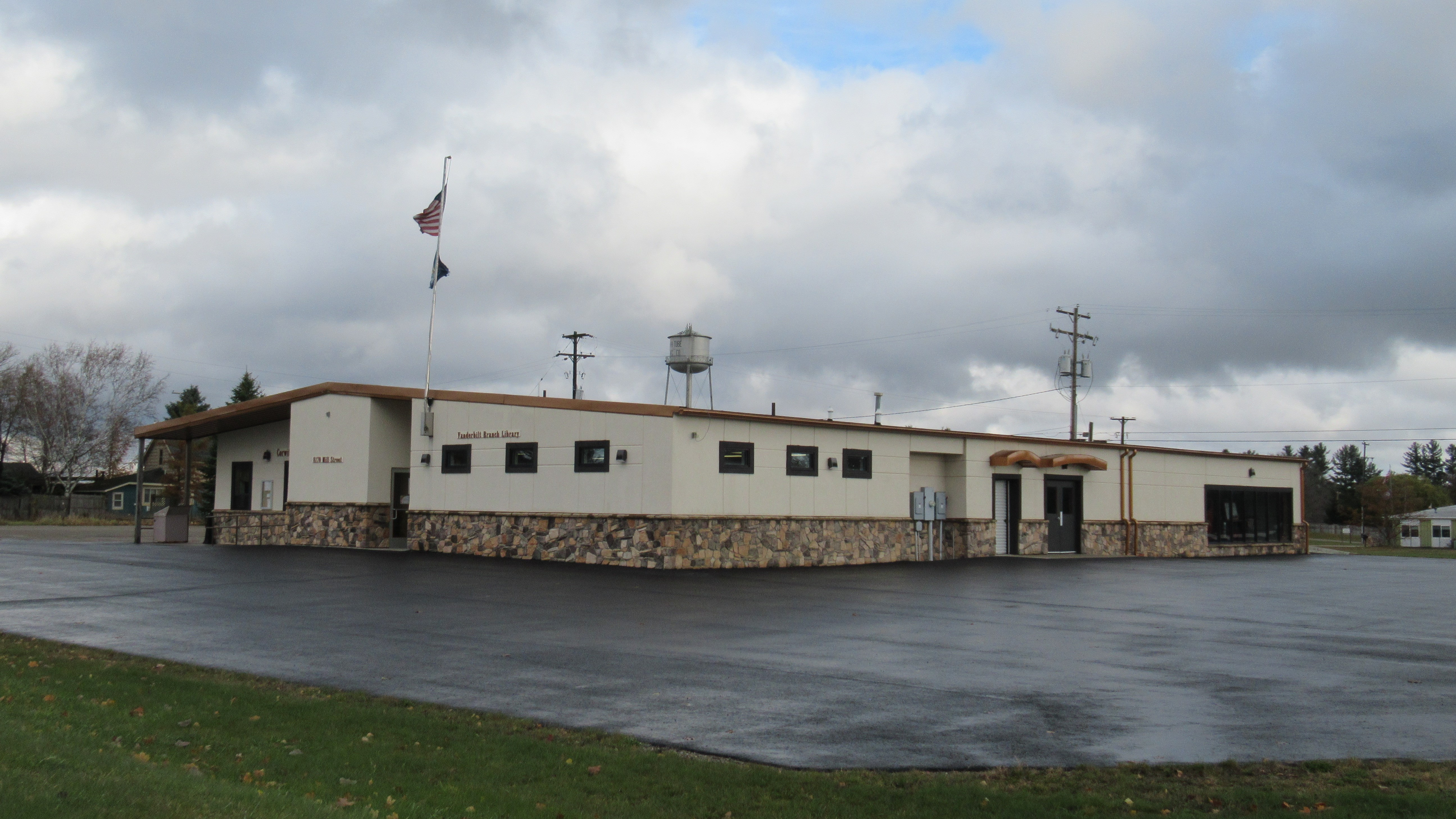
- Corwith Township Hall and Vanderbilt Branch Library in Vanderbilt

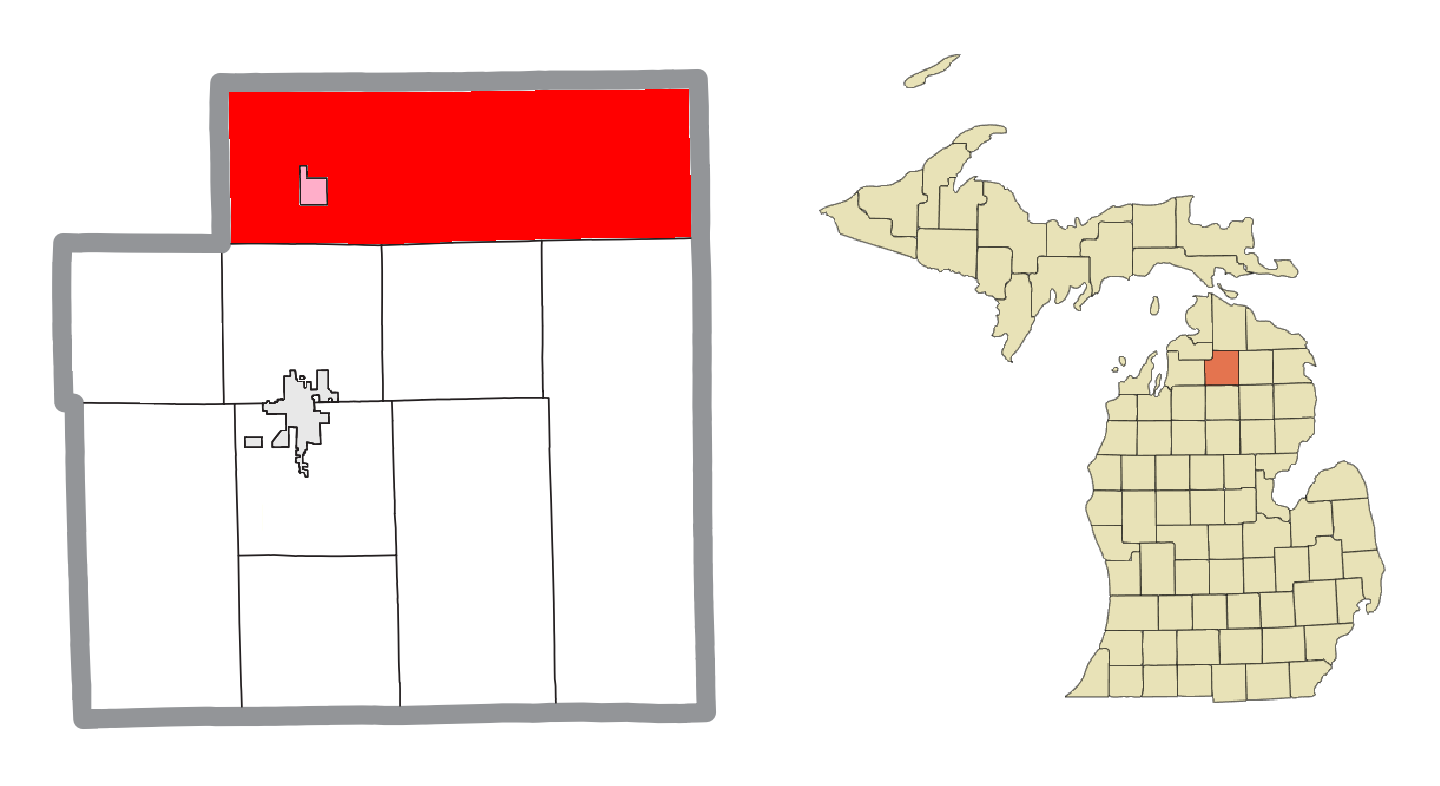
- Location within Otsego County (red) and the administered village of Vanderbilt (pink)

- Location within the state of Michigan Location within the United States
- Coordinates: 45°09′06″N 84°34′29″W
- Country: United States
- State: Michigan
- County: Otsego
- Established: 1877

Government
  - Supervisor: Vernon Kassuba
  - Clerk: Debbie Whitman

Area
  - Total: 108.12 sq mi (280.03 km^{2})
  - Land: 107.48 sq mi (278.37 km^{2})
  - Water: 0.64 sq mi (1.66 km^{2})
- Elevation: 896 ft (273 m)

Population (2020)
  - Total: 1,708
  - Density: 15.89/sq mi (6.136/km^{2})
- Time zone: UTC-5 (Eastern (EST))
  - Summer (DST): UTC-4 (EDT)
- ZIP code(s): 49751 (Johannesburg); 49795 (Vanderbilt); 49799 (Wolverine)
- Area code: 989
- FIPS code: 26-18320
- GNIS feature ID: 1626135
- Website: https://www.corwith.net/

Corwith Township is a civil township of Otsego County in the U.S. state of Michigan. The population was 1,708 at the 2020 census.

== Communities ==
- Green Timbers is an unincorporated community located within the township along the Sturgeon River at 45°10′18″N 84°32′28″W.
- Vanderbilt is a village located within the township at 45°08′35″N 84°39′40″W.

== History ==
The first lumbermill in Otsego County was built within Corwith Township at a place called Berryville in 1877.

== Geography ==
According to the U.S. Census Bureau, the township has a total area of 108.12 square miles (280.03 km^{2}), of which 107.48 square miles (278.37 km^{2}) is land and 0.64 square miles (1.66 km^{2}) (0.59%) is water.

== Demographics ==
As of the census of 2000, there were 1,719 people, 665 households, and 466 families residing in the township. The population density was 16.0 inhabitants per square mile (6.2/km^{2}). There were 1,000 housing units at an average density of 9.3 per square mile (3.6/km^{2}). The racial makeup of the township was 97.21% White, 0.23% African American, 1.05% Native American, 0.17% Asian, 0.06% Pacific Islander, 0.41% from other races, and 0.87% from two or more races. Hispanic or Latino of any race were 0.70% of the population.

There were 665 households, out of which 29.2% had children under the age of 18 living with them, 57.0% were married couples living together, 8.3% had a female householder with no husband present, and 29.8% were non-families. 24.2% of all households were made up of individuals, and 9.6% had someone living alone who was 65 years of age or older. The average household size was 2.55 and the average family size was 2.96.

In the township the population was spread out, with 24.2% under the age of 18, 9.7% from 18 to 24, 28.1% from 25 to 44, 24.3% from 45 to 64, and 13.7% who were 65 years of age or older. The median age was 38 years. For every 100 females, there were 99.7 males. For every 100 females age 18 and over, there were 103.0 males.

The median income for a household in the township was $32,348, and the median income for a family was $38,102. Males had a median income of $25,461 versus $19,511 for females. The per capita income for the township was $15,936. About 7.4% of families and 11.9% of the population were below the poverty line, including 13.8% of those under age 18 and 7.5% of those age 65 or over.
