= Vanderbilt, Michigan =

- Village
- Village of Vanderbilt
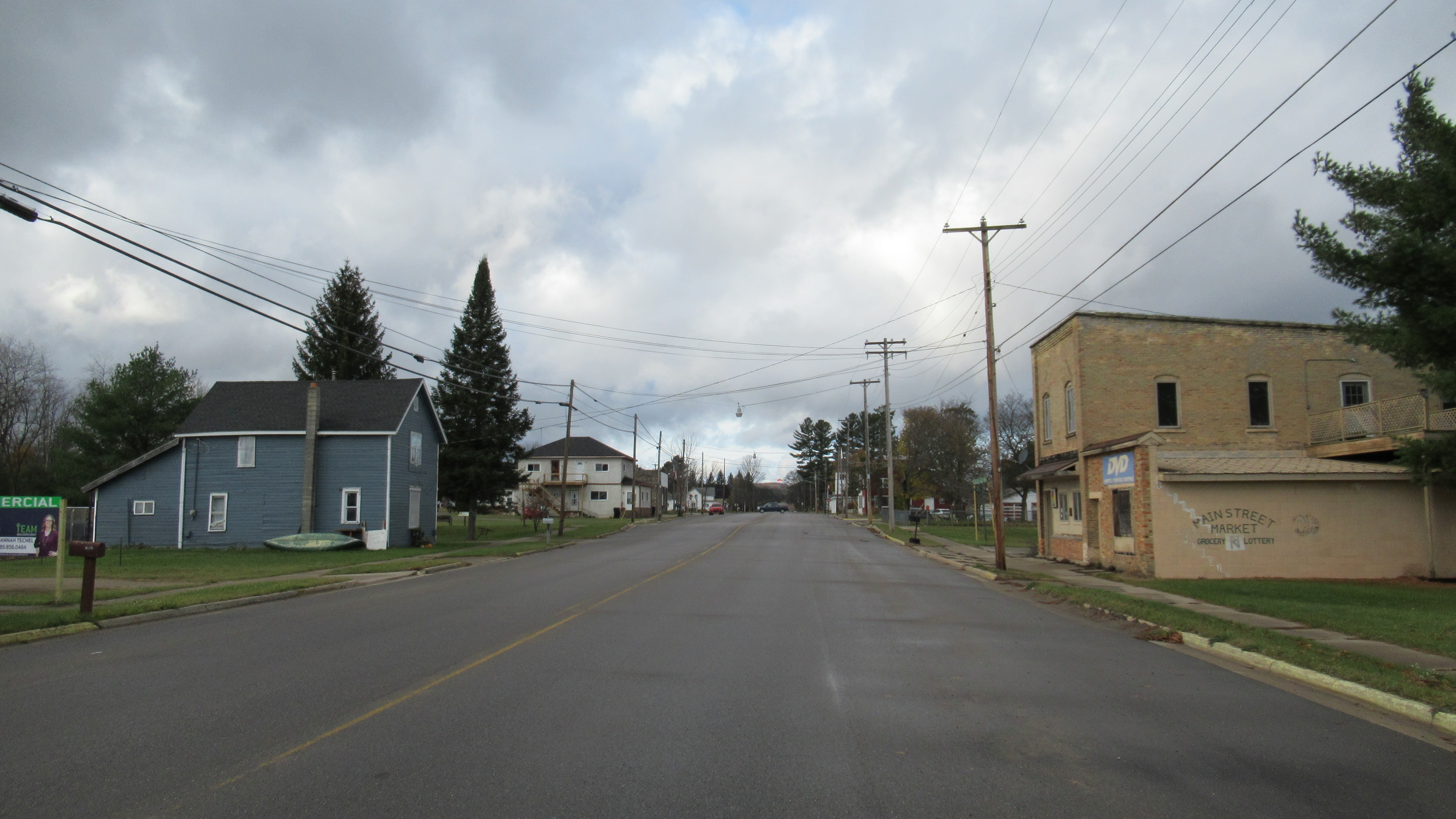
- Looking west along Main Street
- Nickname: Gateway to the Pigeon River Country Forest
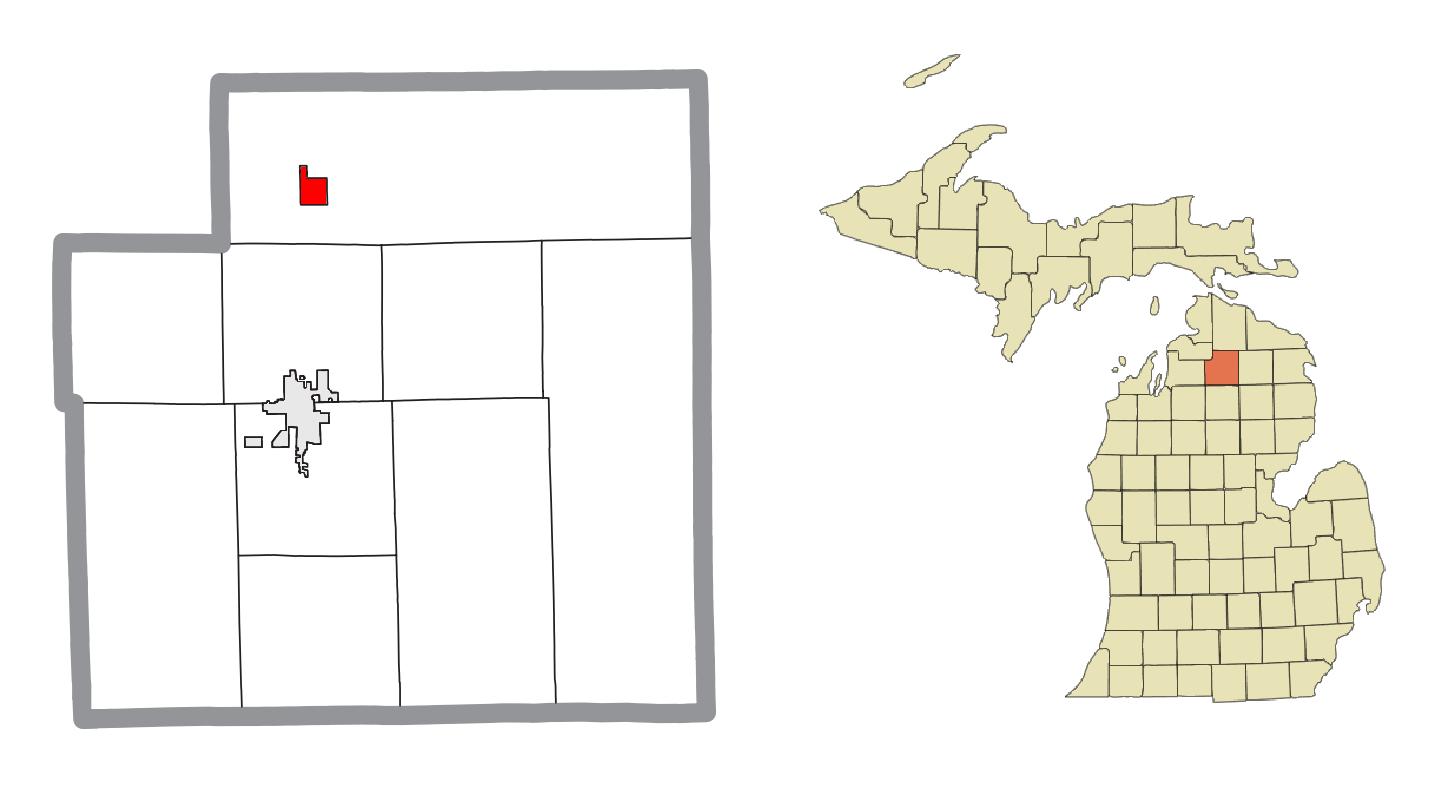
- Location within Otsego County

- Location within the state of Michigan Location within the United States
- Coordinates: 45°08′35″N 84°39′40″W
- Country: United States
- State: Michigan
- County: Otsego
- Township: Corwith
- Settled: 1875
- Incorporated: 1901

Government
  - Type: Village council
  - President: Christina Boone
  - Clerk: Anna Marie Detter

Area
  - Total: 1.09 sq mi (2.82 km^{2})
  - Land: 1.09 sq mi (2.82 km^{2})
  - Water: 0 sq mi (0.00 km^{2})
- Elevation: 1,096 ft (334 m)

Population (2020)
  - Total: 498
  - Density: 456.6/sq mi (176.29/km^{2})
- Time zone: UTC-5 (Eastern (EST))
  - Summer (DST): UTC-4 (EDT)
- ZIP code(s): 49795
- Area code: 989
- FIPS code: 26-81700
- GNIS feature ID: 1615504
- Website: https://www.vanderbiltvillage.com/

Vanderbilt is a village in Otsego County in the U.S. state of Michigan. The population was 498 at the 2020 census. The village is located within Corwith Township.

Vanderbilt holds the record for the coldest recorded temperature in the state of Michigan when it reached −51 °F (−46 °C) on February 9, 1934.

== History ==
The area was first settled as early as 1875 when a railway belonging to the Michigan Central Railroad was planned to extend north from Gaylord. The settlement was named after Cornelius Vanderbilt, who owned land within Corwith Township. The railway reached Vanderbilt by 1881.

The village was incorporated in 1901.

== Geography ==
According to the U.S. Census Bureau, the village has a total area of 1.09 square miles (2.82 km^{2}), all of it land.

=== Major highways ===
- I-75 runs north–south through the western edge of the village and is accessible via exit 290 (Mill Street).

=== Climate ===
This climatic region is typified by large seasonal temperature differences, with warm to hot (and often humid) summers and cold (sometimes severely cold) winters. According to the Köppen Climate Classification system, Vanderbilt has a humid continental climate, abbreviated "Dfb" on climate maps.

On February 9, 1934, the temperature in Vanderbilt fell to −51 °F (−46 °C), the coldest ever recorded in Michigan. On July 13, 1936, the highest temperature recorded in Michigan was in Mio, one county southeast, which reached 112 °F (44 °C).

Climate data for Vanderbilt 11 ENE, Michigan (1991–2020 normals, extremes 1913–present)
Month	Jan	Feb	Mar	Apr	May	Jun	Jul	Aug	Sep	Oct	Nov	Dec	Year
Record high °F (°C)	57 (14)	60 (16)	86 (30)	90 (32)	96 (36)	105 (41)	108 (42)	102 (39)	98 (37)	89 (32)	76 (24)	63 (17)	108 (42)
Mean daily maximum °F (°C)	25.8 (−3.4)	28.4 (−2.0)	38.8 (3.8)	52.0 (11.1)	66.9 (19.4)	76.5 (24.7)	79.9 (26.6)	78.4 (25.8)	69.9 (21.1)	55.6 (13.1)	42.3 (5.7)	31.4 (−0.3)	53.8 (12.1)
Daily mean °F (°C)	16.8 (−8.4)	17.0 (−8.3)	25.9 (−3.4)	38.8 (3.8)	52.4 (11.3)	61.8 (16.6)	65.6 (18.7)	64.0 (17.8)	56.1 (13.4)	44.5 (6.9)	34.1 (1.2)	24.0 (−4.4)	41.8 (5.4)
Mean daily minimum °F (°C)	7.8 (−13.4)	5.7 (−14.6)	13.1 (−10.5)	25.5 (−3.6)	37.8 (3.2)	47.0 (8.3)	51.3 (10.7)	49.7 (9.8)	42.2 (5.7)	33.4 (0.8)	25.8 (−3.4)	16.5 (−8.6)	29.6 (−1.3)
Record low °F (°C)	−40 (−40)	−51 (−46)	−39 (−39)	−13 (−25)	10 (−12)	20 (−7)	27 (−3)	24 (−4)	18 (−8)	6 (−14)	−17 (−27)	−37 (−38)	−51 (−46)
Average precipitation inches (mm)	2.18 (55)	1.49 (38)	1.78 (45)	3.06 (78)	2.92 (74)	3.03 (77)	2.95 (75)	3.51 (89)	3.37 (86)	3.52 (89)	2.42 (61)	2.15 (55)	32.38 (822)
Average snowfall inches (cm)	25.9 (66)	15.3 (39)	11.4 (29)	5.7 (14)	0.2 (0.51)	0.0 (0.0)	0.0 (0.0)	0.0 (0.0)	0.0 (0.0)	0.8 (2.0)	7.1 (18)	17.5 (44)	83.9 (213)
Average precipitation days (≥ 0.01 in)	16.7	11.8	11.1	11.0	11.2	9.8	10.1	9.9	10.9	14.6	13.2	15.1	145.4
Average snowy days (≥ 0.1 in)	15.9	12.8	8.0	3.4	0.1	0.0	0.0	0.0	0.0	0.7	5.9	15.8	59.6
Source: NOAA

== Education ==
The village of Vanderbilt contains its own school district, Vanderbilt Area Schools, which also serves a much larger area that includes all of Corwith Township, as well as small portions of several adjacent townships.

== Demographics ==
Historical population
Census	Pop.	Note	%±
1890	370		—
1910	523		—
1920	394		−24.7%
1930	456		15.7%
1940	405		−11.2%
1950	410		1.2%
1960	509		24.1%
1970	522		2.6%
1980	525		0.6%
1990	605		15.2%
2000	587		−3.0%
2010	562		−4.3%
2020	498		−11.4%
U.S. Decennial Census

=== 2020 Census ===
As of the census of 2020, there were 498 people, 207 households, and 376 families residing in the village. The population density was 456 inhabitants per square mile (176.29/km^2). There were 257 housing units at an average density of 235 per square mile (57/km^2). The racial makeup of the village was 94.8% White, 1.9% African American, 0.22% Native American, and 2.58% from two or more races. Hispanic or Latino if any race were 0.64% of the population.

There were 207 households, of which 21.4% had children under the age of 18 living with them, 52.1% were married couples living together, 18.8% had a female householder without a husband present, 21.7% had a male householder without a wife present, and 0.4% were non-families. 182 of all households were made up of individuals, of which 23 of them had someone living alone who was 65 years of age or older. The average household size was 2.44 and the average family size was 2.90.

The median age in the village was 45 years. 21.4% of residents were under the age of 18; 31% were between the ages of 18 and 24; 72% were from the age of 25 to 44; 1.14% were from the age of 45 to 64; and 17.1% were 65 years or older. The gender makeup of the village was 59.1% male and 40.9% female.

=== 2010 census ===
As of the census of 2010, there were 562 people, 237 households, and 145 families residing in the village. The population density was 497.3 inhabitants per square mile (192.0/km^{2}). There were 278 housing units at an average density of 246.0 per square mile (95.0/km^{2}). The racial makeup of the village was 95.6% White, 0.7% African American, 0.9% Native American, and 2.8% from two or more races. Hispanic or Latino of any race were 0.9% of the population.

There were 237 households, of which 26.6% had children under the age of 18 living with them, 45.6% were married couples living together, 13.1% had a female householder with no husband present, 2.5% had a male householder with no wife present, and 38.8% were non-families. 33.3% of all households were made up of individuals, and 14.4% had someone living alone who was 65 years of age or older. The average household size was 2.37 and the average family size was 3.01.

The median age in the village was 44 years. 21.7% of residents were under the age of 18; 7.9% were between the ages of 18 and 24; 21.9% were from 25 to 44; 30.3% were from 45 to 64; and 18.1% were 65 years of age or older. The gender makeup of the village was 48.8% male and 51.2% female.

=== 2000 census ===
As of the census of 2000, there were 587 people, 241 households, and 148 families residing in the village. The population density was 530.6 inhabitants per square mile (204.9/km^{2}). There were 269 housing units at an average density of 243.2 per square mile (93.9/km^{2}). The racial makeup of the village was 97.79% White, 0.17% African American, 1.70% Native American, and 0.34% from two or more races.

There were 241 households, out of which 29.0% had children under the age of 18 living with them, 46.5% were married couples living together, 10.0% had a female householder with no husband present, and 38.2% were non-families. 33.6% of all households were made up of individuals, and 14.9% had someone living alone who was 65 years of age or older. The average household size was 2.44 and the average family size was 3.09.

In the village, the population was spread out, with 25.7% under the age of 18, 10.6% from 18 to 24, 28.8% from 25 to 44, 20.1% from 45 to 64, and 14.8% who were 65 years of age or older. The median age was 36 years. For every 100 females, there were 98.3 males. For every 100 females age 18 and over, there were 96.4 males.

The median income for a household in the village was $27,969, and the median income for a family was $37,857. Males had a median income of $25,000 versus $19,875 for females. The per capita income for the village was $11,973. None of the families and 6.8% of the population were living below the poverty line, including no under eighteens and 8.9% of those over 64.

== Images ==
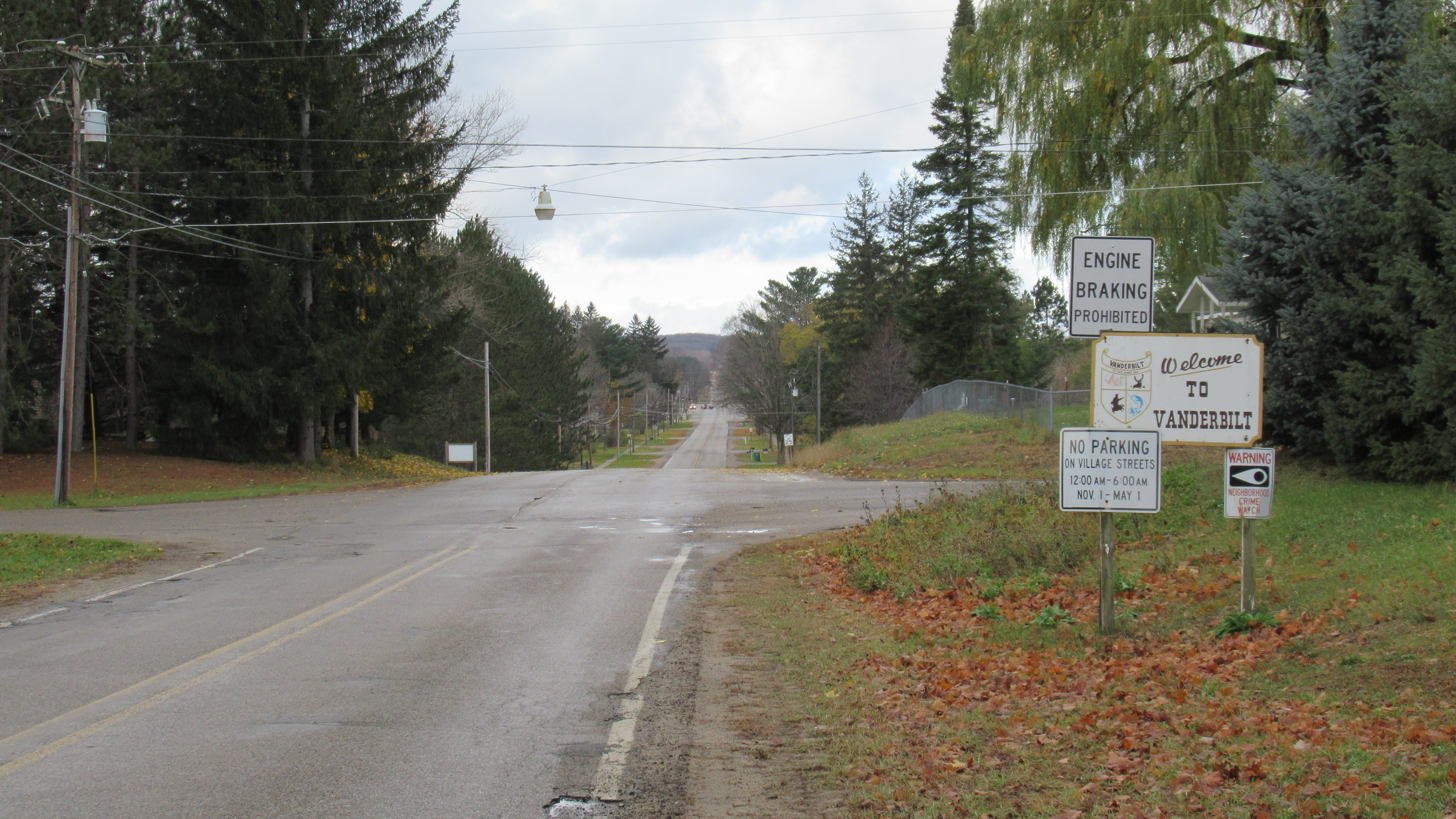
Entrance sign along Main Street

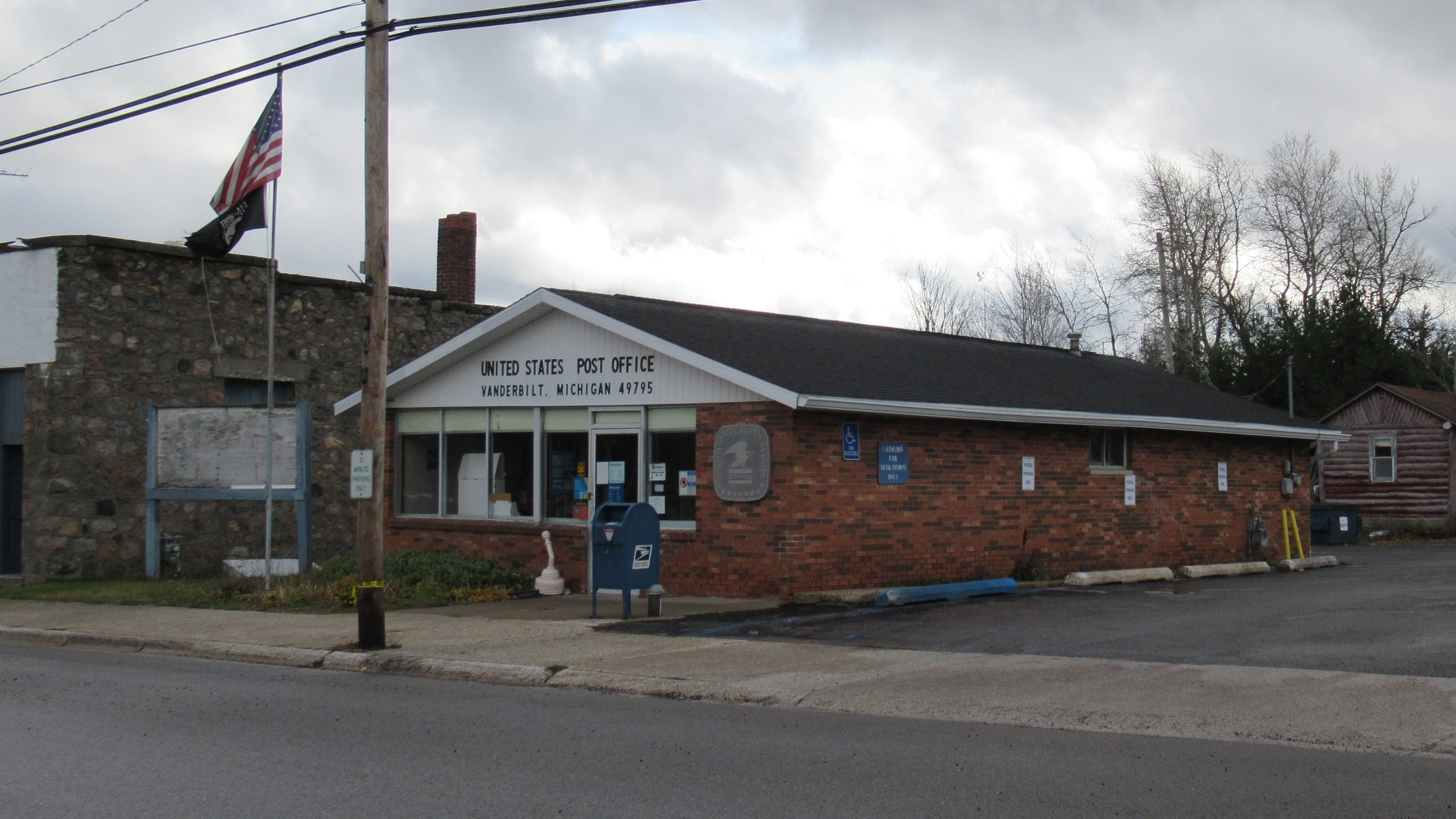
U.S. Post Office in Vanderbilt

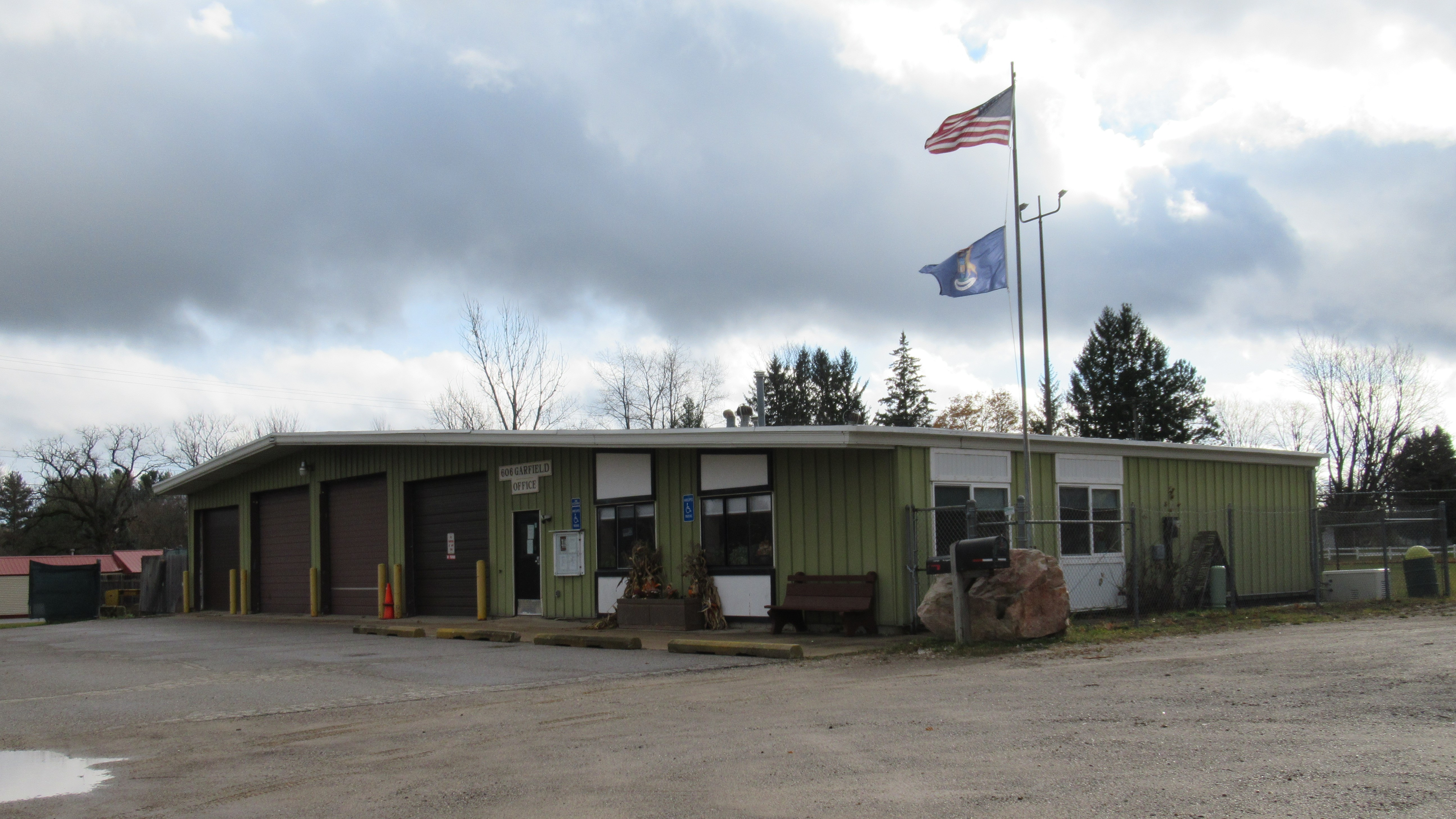
Vanderbilt village office

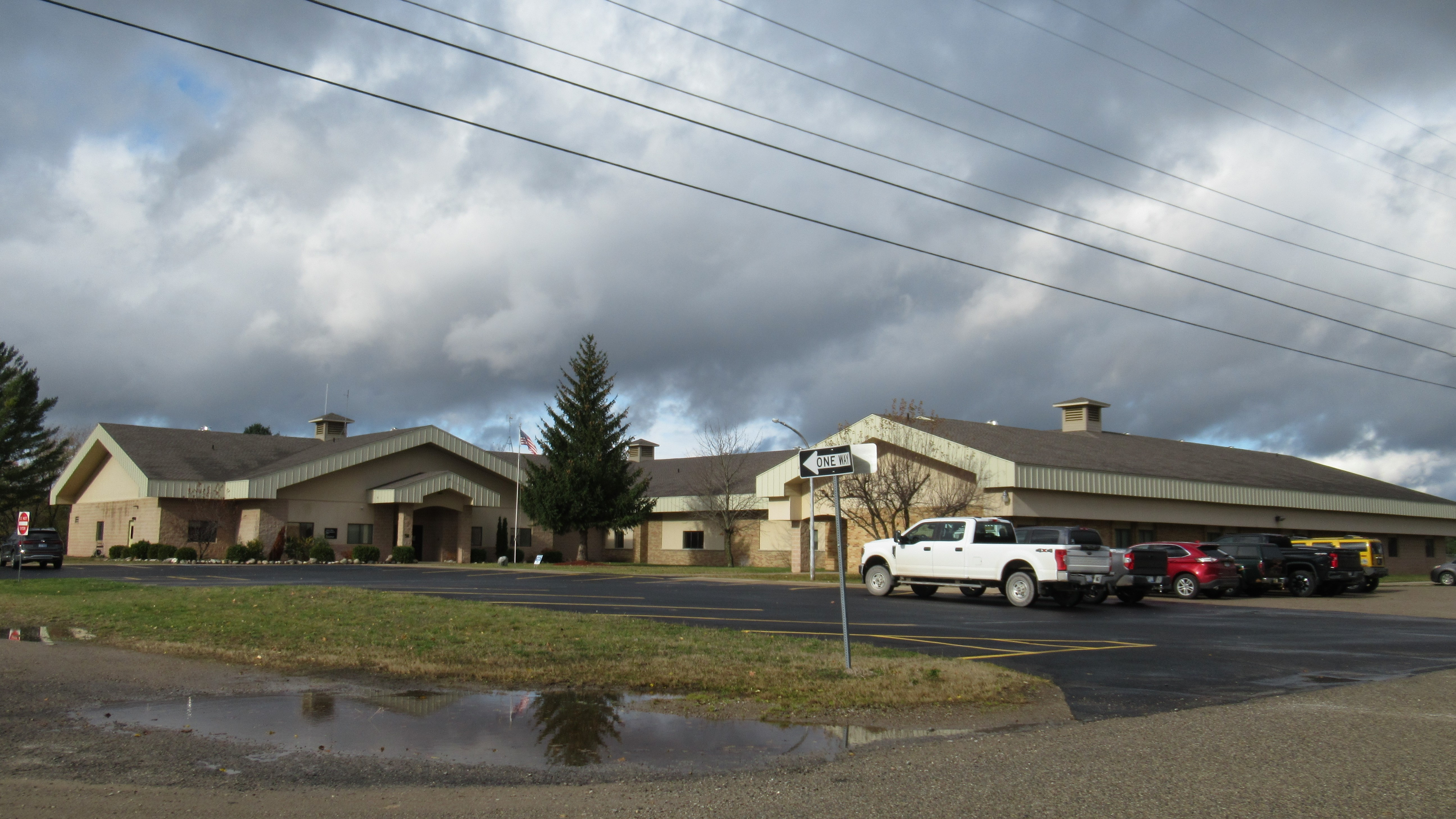
Vanderbilt Area Schools
