= Koehler Township, Michigan =

- Civil township
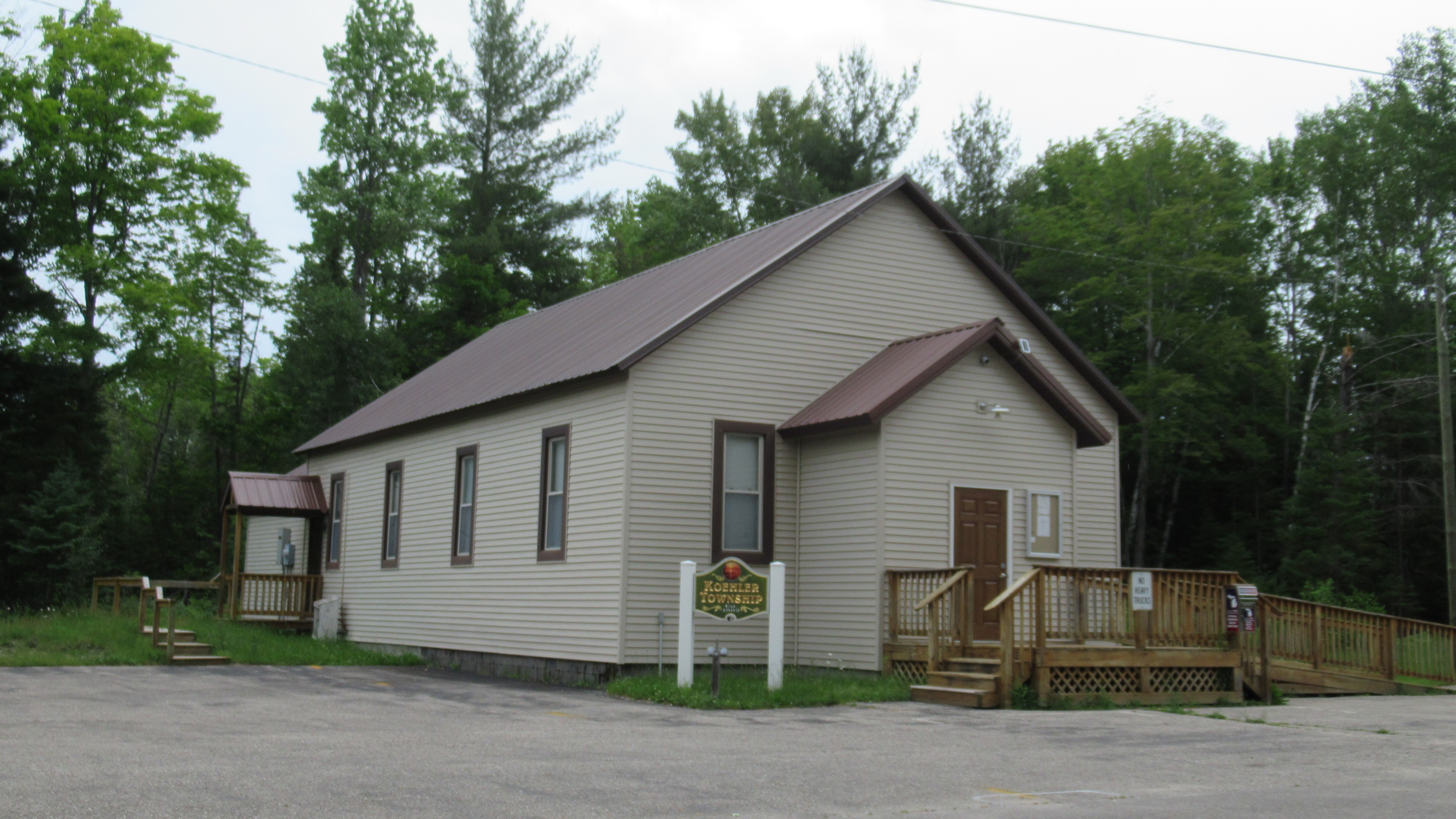
- Koehler Township Hall

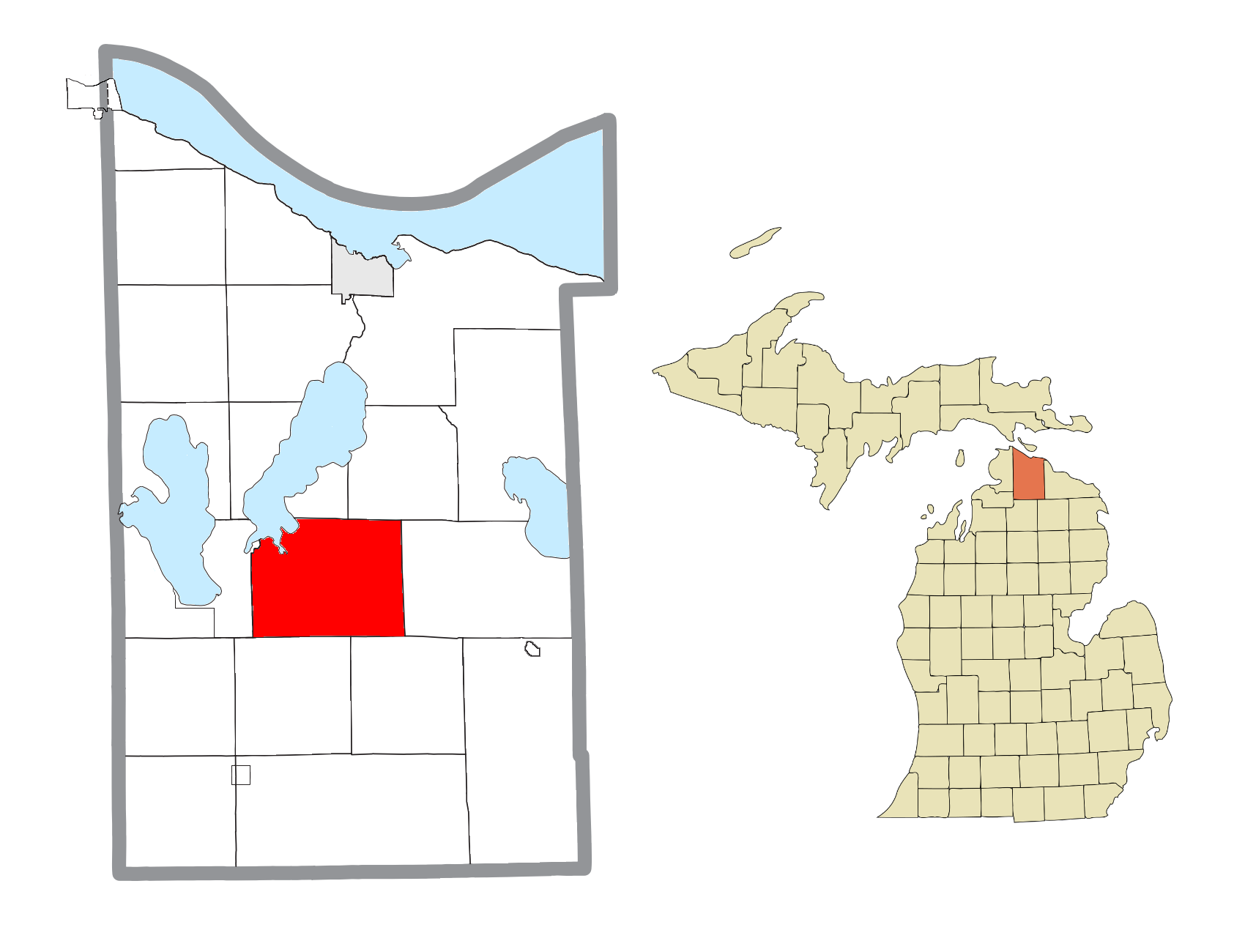
- Location within Cheboygan County

- Location within the state of Michigan Location within the United States
- Coordinates: 45°25′20″N 84°31′40″W
- Country: United States
- State: Michigan
- County: Cheboygan
- Established: 1903

Government
  - Supervisor: Steven DuBois
  - Clerk: Renee Neri

Area
  - Total: 46.00 sq mi (119.14 km^{2})
  - Land: 43.56 sq mi (112.82 km^{2})
  - Water: 2.44 sq mi (6.32 km^{2})
- Elevation: 690 ft (210 m)

Population (2020)
  - Total: 1,193
  - Density: 27.39/sq mi (10.57/km^{2})
- Time zone: UTC-5 (Eastern (EST))
  - Summer (DST): UTC-4 (EDT)
- ZIP code(s): 49705 (Afton); 49721 (Cheboygan); 49749 (Indian River)
- Area code: 231
- FIPS code: 26-43820
- GNIS feature ID: 1626566
- Website: Official website

Koehler Township is a civil township of Cheboygan County in the U.S. state of Michigan. The population was 1,193 at the 2020 census.

== Geography ==
Koehler Township is located near the center of Cheboygan County. The southern end of Mullett Lake is in the northwest corner of the township, and the census-designated place of Indian River borders the western side of the township. According to the United States Census Bureau, Koehler Township has a total area of 46.0 square miles (119.1 km^{2}), of which 43.6 square miles (112.8 km^{2}) is land and 2.4 square miles (6.3 km^{2}), or 5.31%, is water.

== Demographics ==
As of the census of 2000, there were 1,168 people, 444 households, and 340 families residing in the township. The population density was 26.8 inhabitants per square mile (10.3/km^{2}). There were 795 housing units at an average density of 18.3 per square mile (7.1/km^{2}). The racial makeup of the township was 96.40% White, 1.28% African American, 0.94% Native American, 0.09% Asian, and 1.28% from two or more races. Hispanic or Latino of any race were 1.63% of the population.

There were 444 households, out of which 30.0% had children under the age of 18 living with them, 67.3% were married couples living together, 6.8% had a female householder with no husband present, and 23.2% were non-families. 20.3% of all households were made up of individuals, and 8.6% had someone living alone who was 65 years of age or older. The average household size was 2.59 and the average family size was 2.95.

In the township the population was spread out, with 25.0% under the age of 18, 7.6% from 18 to 24, 24.2% from 25 to 44, 27.4% from 45 to 64, and 15.8% who were 65 years of age or older. The median age was 40 years. For every 100 females, there were 103.5 males. For every 100 females age 18 and over, there were 101.8 males.

The median income for a household in the township was $31,509, and the median income for a family was $36,477. Males had a median income of $28,929 versus $21,000 for females. The per capita income for the township was $16,072. About 10.9% of families and 14.4% of the population were below the poverty line, including 21.6% of those under age 18 and 5.5% of those age 65 or over.
