= Walker Township, Michigan =

- Civil township
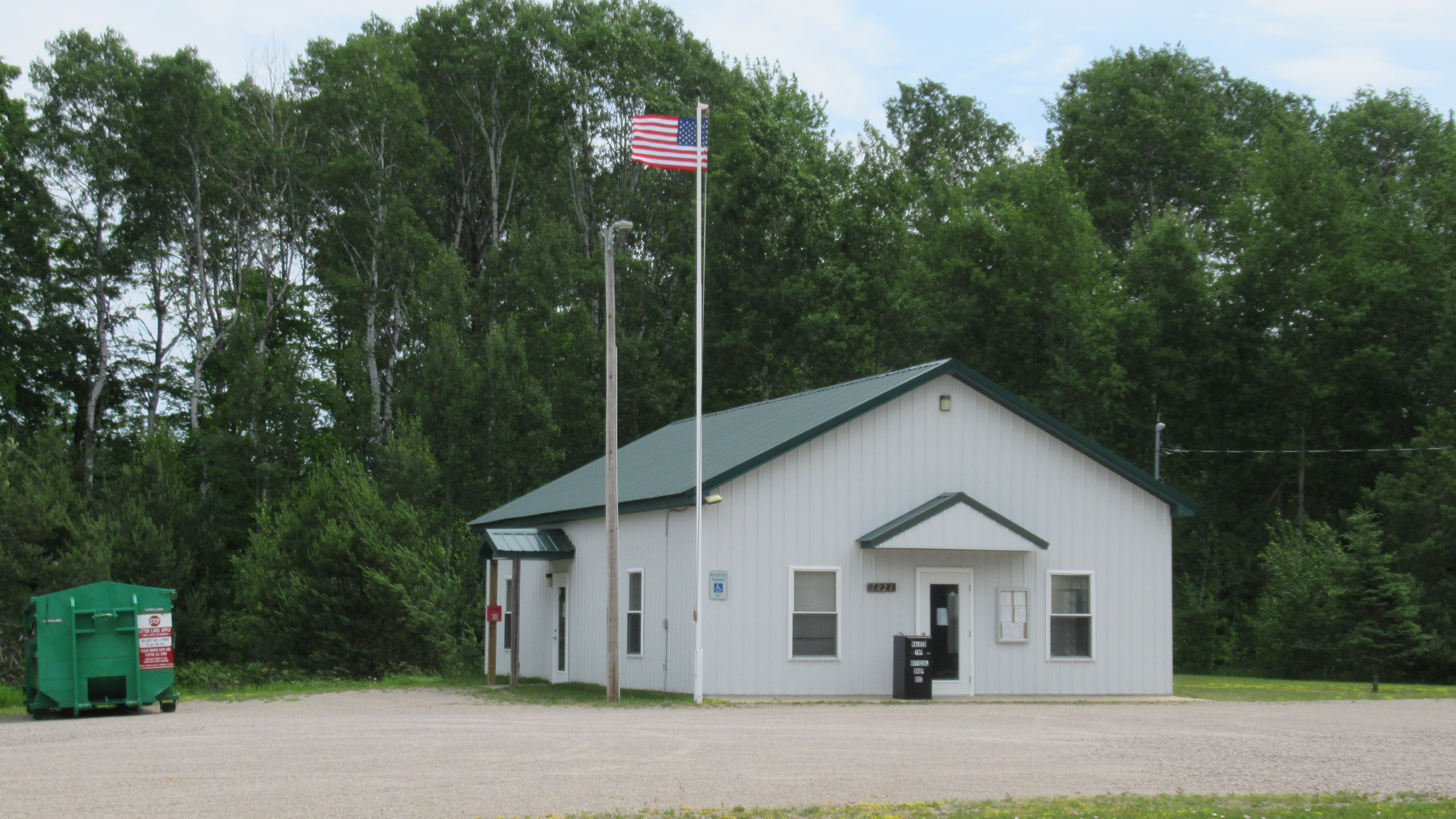
- Walker Township Hall

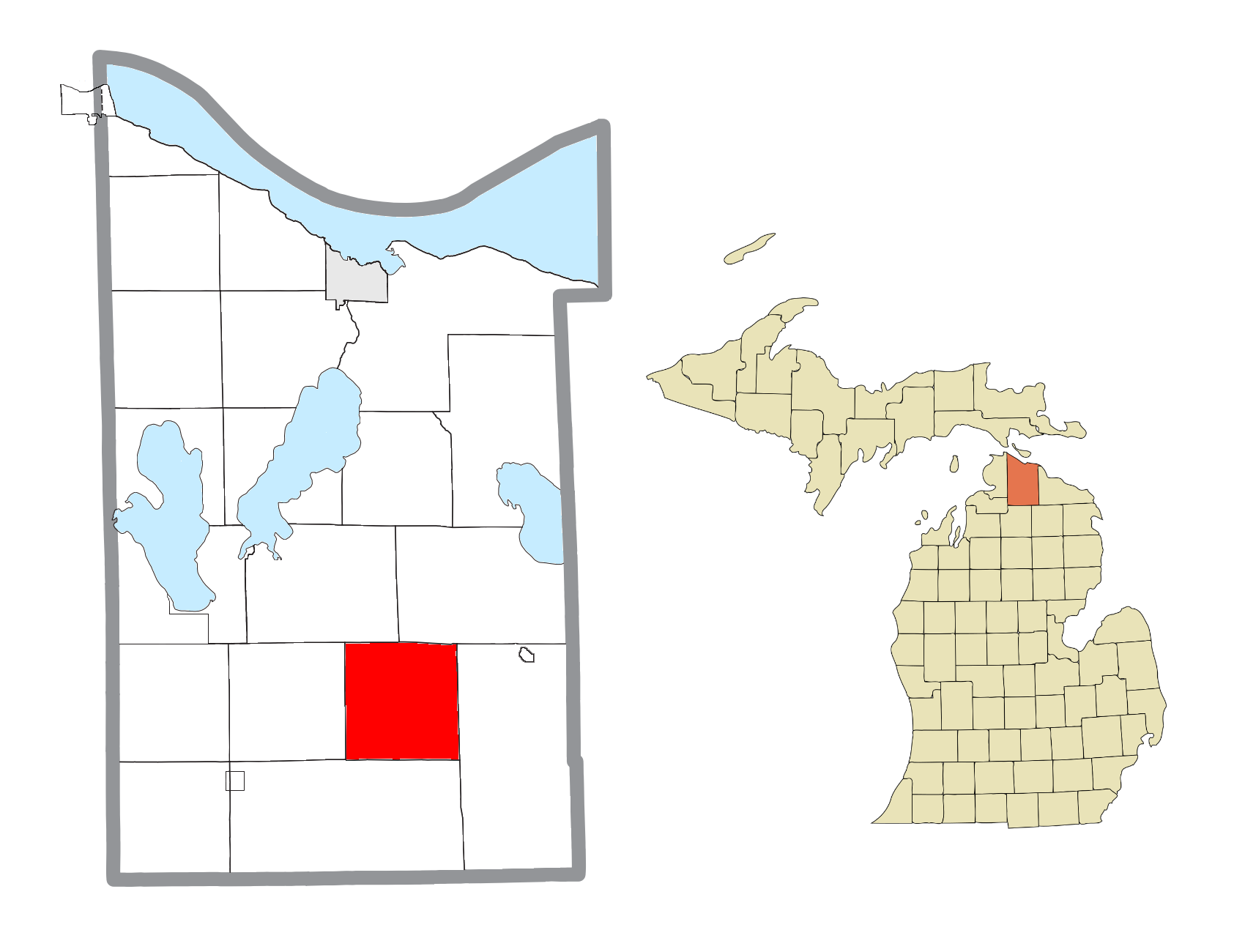
- Location within Cheboygan County

- Location within the state of Michigan Location within the United States
- Coordinates: 45°19′39″N 84°24′38″W
- Country: United States
- State: Michigan
- County: Cheboygan
- Established: 1904

Government
  - Supervisor: Joshua Joseph
  - Clerk: Julie Northrop

Area
  - Total: 34.55 sq mi (89.48 km^{2})
  - Land: 34.19 sq mi (88.55 km^{2})
  - Water: 0.36 sq mi (0.93 km^{2})
- Elevation: 883 ft (269 m)

Population (2020)
  - Total: 297
  - Density: 8.69/sq mi (3.36/km^{2})
- Time zone: UTC-5 (Eastern (EST))
  - Summer (DST): UTC-4 (EDT)
- ZIP code(s): 49705 (Afton)
- Area code: 231
- FIPS code: 26-82940
- GNIS feature ID: 1627208

Walker Township is a civil township of Cheboygan County in the U.S. state of Michigan. As of the 2020 census, the township population was 297.

== Geography ==
Walker Township is located in southern Cheboygan County. According to the United States Census Bureau, the township has a total area of 34.6 square miles (89.5 km^{2}), of which 34.2 square miles (88.6 km^{2}) is land and 0.35 square miles (0.9 km^{2}), or 1.03%, is water.

== Demographics ==
As of the census of 2000, there were 292 people, 101 households, and 78 families residing in the township. The population density was 8.5 per square mile (3.3/km^{2}). There were 170 housing units at an average density of 5.0 per square mile (1.9/km^{2}). The racial makeup of the township was 97.60% White, 0.34% Native American, 1.03% from other races, and 1.03% from two or more races.

There were 101 households, out of which 36.6% had children under the age of 18 living with them, 60.4% were married couples living together, 10.9% had a female householder with no husband present, and 21.8% were non-families. 18.8% of all households were made up of individuals, and 7.9% had someone living alone who was 65 years of age or older. The average household size was 2.70 and the average family size was 3.06.

In the township the population was spread out, with 26.0% under the age of 18, 6.5% from 18 to 24, 25.3% from 25 to 44, 29.5% from 45 to 64, and 12.7% who were 65 years of age or older. The median age was 40 years. For every 100 females, there were 114.7 males. For every 100 females age 18 and over, there were 101.9 males.

The median income for a household in the township was $39,286, and the median income for a family was $38,750. Males had a median income of $31,250 versus $24,250 for females. The per capita income for the township was $16,833. About 5.3% of families and 6.2% of the population were below the poverty line, including 8.2% of those under the age of eighteen and none of those 65 or over.
