= Pigeon River (Huron County, Michigan) =

Location
- Country: United States

Physical characteristics
- Source
  - location: Sheridan Township, Huron County, Michigan
- Mouth
  - location: Saginaw Bay, Huron County, Michigan
  - coordinates: 43°56′45″N 83°16′48″W
  - elevation: 581 ft (177 m)
- Length: 38 mi (61 km)

The Pigeon River, also known as the East Branch Pigeon River, is a 37.9-mile-long (61.0 km) stream in Huron County in the Thumb of the U.S. state of Michigan.

The stream rises from the confluence of Appin and Livingston drains in southern Sheridan Township. It flows north and west to empty into the Saginaw Bay of Lake Huron in Caseville

== Tributaries ==
From the mouth:

- (left) Rush Lake Drain
  - Rush Lake
- (left) Fisher Drain
  - (right) Thompson Drain
- (left) Van Drain
  - (left) Fluegge Drain
  - (left) Bechler Drain
- (right) Newman Drain
- (left) Gorke Drain
- (right) West Branch Extension
  - (right) Hinton Drain
- (left) Schultz Drain
- (right) Hartman Drain
- (left) Beaubien Drain
- (right) Little Pigeon River, also known as West Branch Pigeon River
  - (right) Matthews Drain
    - Mud Lake
  - (left) Huron Drain
    - (left) Moore Drain
    - (left) McComb Drain
    - (right) Rawson Drain
    - (left) Crawford Drain (in Tuscola County)
    - (right) Knight Drain (in Tuscola County)
    - (right) Muntz Drain (in Tuscola County)
- (left) Blair Drain
  - (left) Clift Drain
- (right) Jordan Drain
- (right) Moore Drain
- (left) Elk Drain
- (left) Patterson Drain
- (left) Appin Drain
  - (right) Shier Drain
    - (left) North Branch Shier Drain
  - (right) Reid Drain
- (right) Livingston Drain
