= Pigeon River (Mullett Lake) =

River in Michigan, United States

Coordinates: 45°26′10″N 84°33′23″W

The Pigeon River is part of the Lake Huron watershed in Michigan in the United States. It is one of many rivers that have their headwaters in Otsego County. The Pigeon River's headwaters start just north and east of Gaylord, Michigan, at the Otsego Club and Resort. From there the river flows north 47.4 miles (76.3 km) through private land and the Pigeon River Country State Forest to Mullett Lake.

Much of the Pigeon River is classified by the Michigan Department Natural Resources (DNR) as a blue ribbon trout stream with special fishing regulations to conserve and enhance the trout fishery. The Pigeon is also a designated Natural River with special regulations regarding development along its banks.

== Name ==
The Pigeon River was named for the huge flocks of passenger pigeons that nested in and migrated through the area, before the species became extinct, primarily due to over-hunting.

== Dam failures ==
There is one dam on the Pigeon located approximately one mile upstream from Sturgeon Valley Road. The original dam was an earth and log structure constructed by a private hunting and fishing club in the early to mid 20th century to create a pond called the Lansing Club pond. This dam failed in the late 1950s, washing accumulated sediment downstream, harming fish and insect populations and habitat. Another concrete dam was built, this one able to use the hydropower to generate electricity. Golden Lotus Inc. bought the property from the club and set up a retreat called Song Of The Morning Ranch (SOM). They used the dam to provide electricity.

In 1984 SOM conducted planned drawdown of the pond in order to perform maintenance work on the dam. During this drawdown, there was another dam failure, resulting in a massive sediment discharge for several days. The discharge caused a massive fish kill immediately, and destroyed critical fish and insect habitat for many years. In an ensuing court case, Golden Lotus maintained that they'd been following standard procedures under DNR supervision.

Stricter regulations were placed on the dam operation at that point.

Another dam failure, the third in 75 years, occurred in 2008. A heavy rainstorm resulted in another large sediment release from the pond, with another massive fish and habitat kill.
