= Tower, Michigan =

- Census-designated place (CDP) & unincorporated community
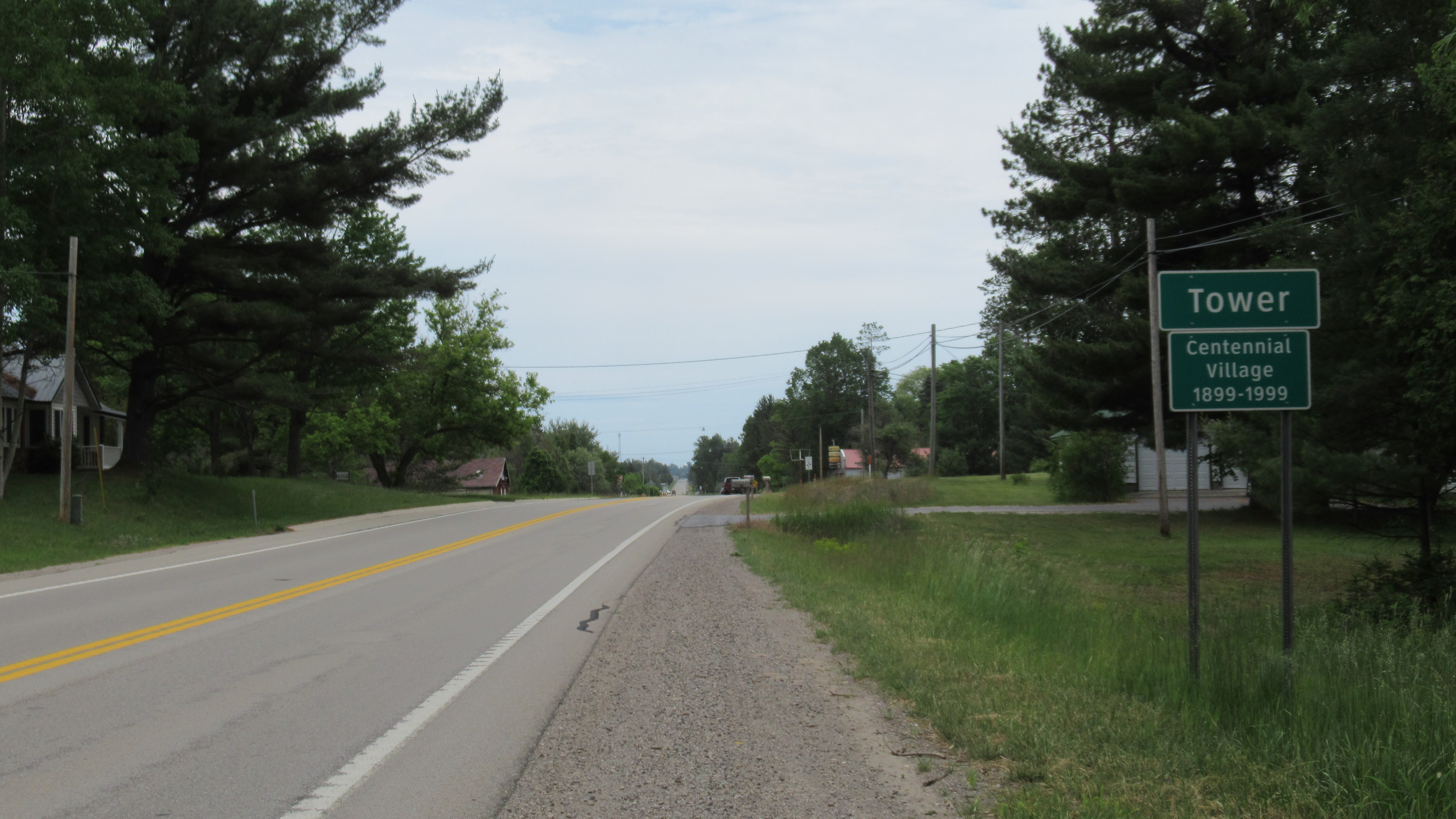
- Road signage looking east along M-33/M-68

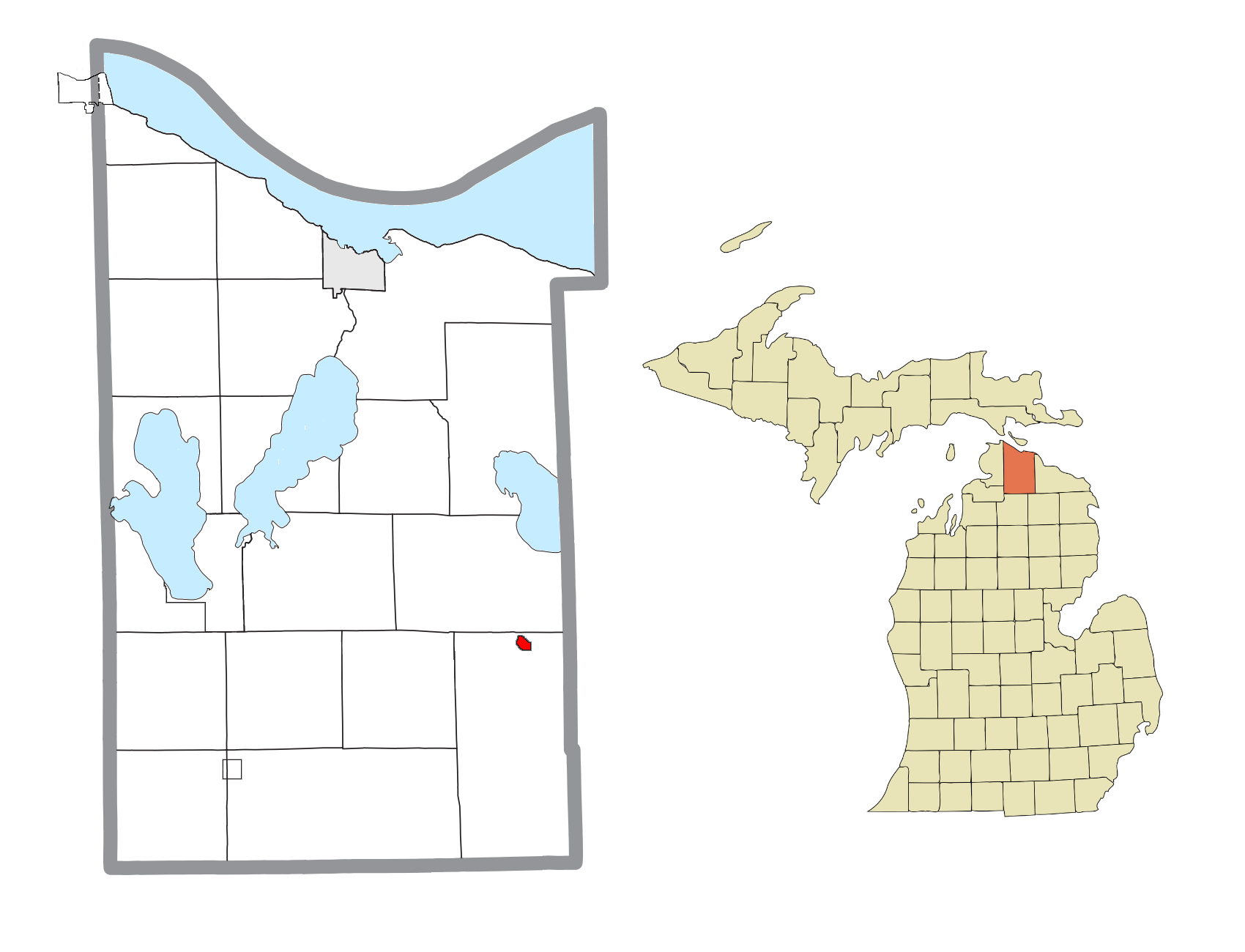
- Location within Cheboygan County

- Location within the state of Michigan Location within the United States
- Coordinates: 45°21′19″N 84°18′02″W
- Country: United States
- State: Michigan
- County: Cheboygan
- Township: Forest
- Settled: 1899

Area
  - Total: 0.61 sq mi (1.58 km^{2})
  - Land: 0.54 sq mi (1.40 km^{2})
  - Water: 0.069 sq mi (0.18 km^{2})
- Elevation: 728 ft (222 m)

Population (2020)
  - Total: 248
  - Density: 459.26/sq mi (177.32/km^{2})
- Time zone: UTC-5 (Eastern (EST))
  - Summer (DST): UTC-4 (EDT)
- ZIP code(s): 49765 (Onaway); 49792
- Area code: 989
- GNIS feature ID: 1614982; 2806319

Tower is an unincorporated community and census-designated place (CDP) in Cheboygan County in the U.S. state of Michigan. The population of the CDP was 248 at the 2020 census. It is located along the concurrency of M-33 and M-68 within Forest Township.

As an unincorporated community, Tower has no legal autonomy of its own. While the community is now served by the Onaway 49765 ZIP Code, the community contains its own post office box service with the 49792 ZIP Code.

== Geography ==
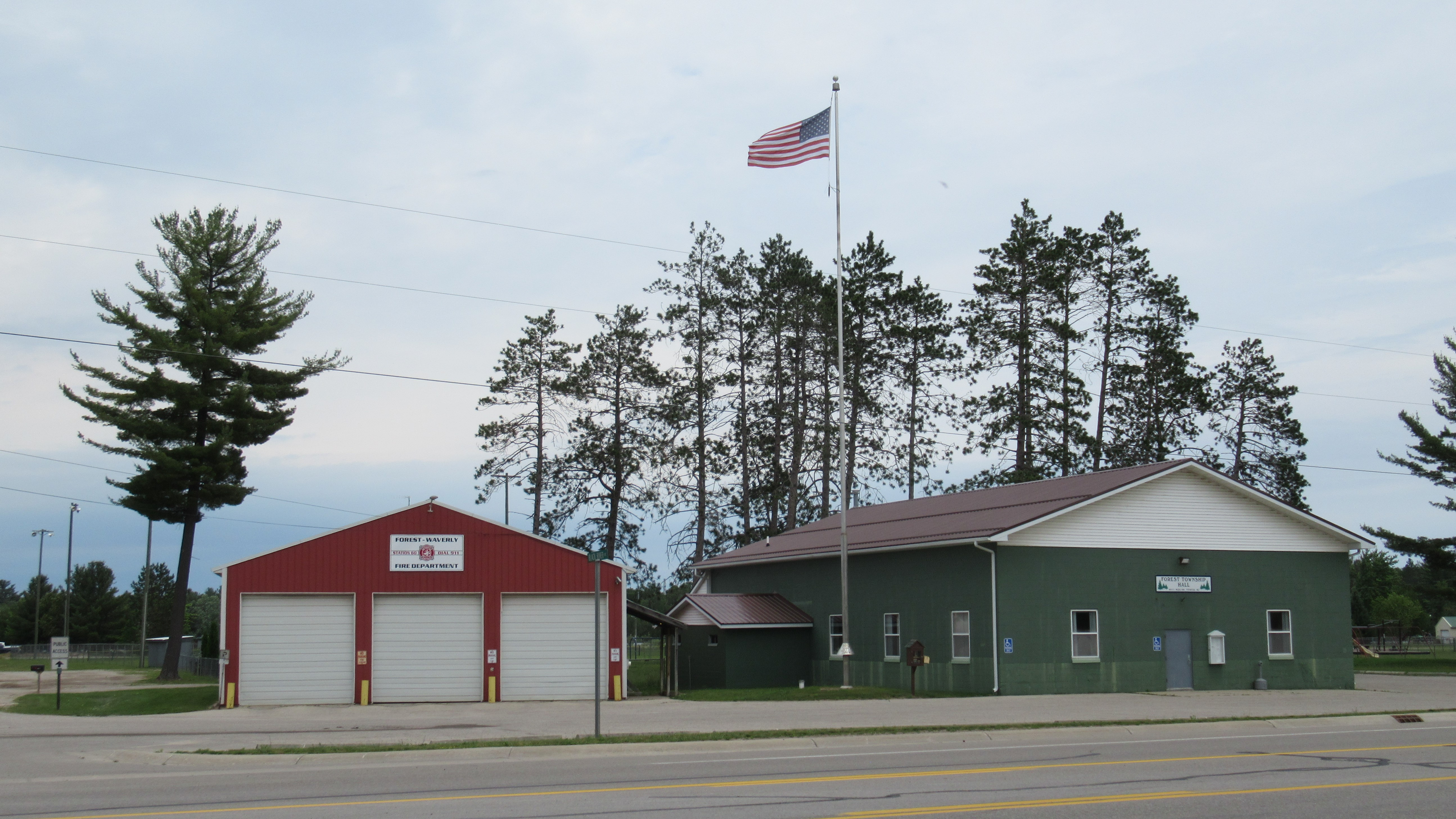
Forest–Waverly Fire Department and Forest Township Hall in Tower

Tower is a rural community in Cheboygan County in Northern Michigan. The community is located in the northern portion of Forest Township just south of the boundary with Waverly Township. Tower sits at an elevation of 722 feet (220 m) above sea level.

The state highways M-33 and M-68, which run concurrent during this stretch of their routes, is the main roadway through the community. Interstate 75 is about 16 miles (25.7 km) to the west. F-05, known locally as South Black River Road, is a county-designated highway that begins just east of Tower and runs for 24.5 miles (39.4 km) northwest to provide direct road access to the city of Cheboygan. Tower is relatively isolated and is the only community within Forest Township. Other nearby unincorporated communities include Afton, Fingerboard Corner, and Legrand to the west, as well as Hangore Heights and Black Lake to the north. The village of Onaway is located about 4.0 miles (6.4 km) to the east in Presque Isle County.

The community of Tower is located along the Upper Black River, and this portion of the river contains two hydroelectric dams. The Kleber Dam and Tower Dam are located within the vicinity, and each dam has its own reservoir. Tower Pond has a size of 102 acres (41 ha), and the community mostly surrounds this reservoir. Kleber Pond is located north of the community and has a much larger size of 267–295 acres (108–119 ha). Both reservoirs are popular areas for fishing, and a small boat launch is located in the park next to the township hall to provide access to Tower Pond. Bowen Creek is a small tributary that drains into the Black River in the eastern portion of the community. The large Black Lake is located about 5.0 miles (8.0 km) to the north. Portions of the surrounding forest lands are part of the Gaylord Unit of the Mackinaw State Forest. The North Eastern State Trail is a rail trail that passes through Tower and has a trailhead in the northern portion of the community near the Tower Dam. The mixed-use trail runs for 70 miles (110 km) from Alpena to Cheboygan.

The Forest Township Hall is located in the center of the community at 9511 M-33/68 Highway. The Forest–Waverly Fire Department is located right next to the township hall, and the volunteer fire department serves both Forest Township and Waverly Township. The community of Tower is served by Onaway Area Community School District to the east in Allis Township. Tower no longer has its own physical post office building and is now served primarily by the Onaway 49765 ZIP Code.

== History ==
=== Lumber community ===
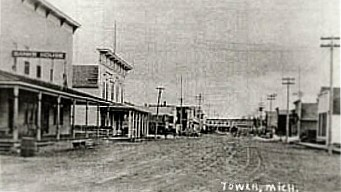
Historic image of downtown Tower

This area of Forest Township was first settled as early as 1899 when the Detroit and Mackinac Railway built a rail line through the area on its route from Bay City to Cheboygan. A small lumber settlement began to grow along the Black River, and a post office first opened on April 18, 1899. James A. Kelley served as the first postmaster, and the community adopted the name Tower. The name was chosen in honor of Ellen May Tower, who was the daughter of Civil War veteran and current resident Judge Samuel S. Tower. Originally from Byron, Ellen served as a nurse in the Spanish–American War. While serving in Puerto Rico, which at the time was controlled by Spain, she died of acute pericarditis from typhoid fever. At the age of 30, she died on December 9, 1898—one day before the signing of the Treaty of Paris, which officially ended the war. As such, she became the first American servicewoman to die during a war on foreign soil. She was also the first Michigan woman to be given full military honors at her funeral, which was attended by thousands of mourners in Byron.

The new community of Tower was quickly platted on May 20, 1899. The community became a prominent source of lumber and benefited greatly from the new railroad and its location along the Black River, where lumber could easily be floated to nearby sawmills. By 1901, Tower contained two sawmills and recorded a population of around 300. The Detroit and Mackinac Railway built its first train depot here in 1902, and this allowed the community to grow substantially. The community first appeared in a 1902 map of Forest Township. During the decade, Tower grew to include numerous businesses, including hotels, laundry facilities, banks, markets, factories, and a fire department with a horse-drawn fire truck. From 1905 to 1906, Tower also briefly had its own newspaper, The Tower Press.

=== Village of Tower ===
At the turn of the century, Tower was thriving as a lumber community. In 1906, it incorporated as a village within Forest Township. At the 1910 census, the village recorded an official population of 545.

The area was prone to forest fires, and in 1908, a fire destroyed several buildings in Tower. In 1910, the community boasted its highest population of around 800 residents and lumber workers. Tower grew to include several churches, a school, five sawmills, seven saloons, and many other manufacturing businesses. That same year, the Tower Dam began construction, and the new Tower Pond reservoir aided significantly in the transportation of lumber to the nearby train depot. During wintertime, ice was harvested from the reservoir for use in the community and railroad. Tower also received telephone service at this time.

Soon after, the lumber resources began declining in the area, and lumber companies had to relocate further north. Over the next few years, the lumber industry in Tower ceased operations, and the population dwindled. Tower did not record a population for the following 1920 census, which meant the village had disincorporated and returned to unincorporated community status around that time.

=== Decline ===
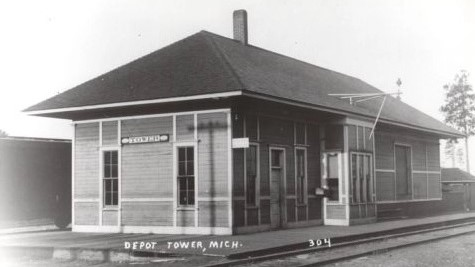
Former train depot in Tower

The Au Sable–Oscoda Fire broke out on July 11, 1911. While it was actually a series of wildfires, it burned rapidly and devastated numerous communities throughout the region, mainly Au Sable and Oscoda over 100 miles (160 km) to the southeast. Due to the warm summer temperatures and dry lumber conditions, the fires spread quickly through many lumber communities. Residents of Tower foresaw the dangers of the approaching fires and worked quickly to save as many structures as possible. Tower was nearly deserted as everyone fled east to Onaway. Throughout the fire, numerous brave men stayed in Tower and worked nonstop to save as many lumber resources, railway equipment, and buildings as possible. However, Tower still suffered extensive damage but was not completely destroyed due to their efforts to save the community. The train depot, freight house, numerous mills, dozens of railway cars, and many structures were lost in the fire.

The fires during the summer of 1911 caused a severe shortage in the state's lumber industry. With lumber resources already depleting throughout the Northern Michigan region, lumber companies were forced to devote their resources to more plentiful regions in the north. After the devastating fire in Tower, the community's lumber industry was never rebuilt. The Forest Lumber Company left Tower in 1915 and moved further north to Raco in the Upper Peninsula. By 1916, Tower recording a dwindling population of only 300 residents and included two banks, two churches, school, hotel, and a few smaller lumber facilities. The original train depot was never rebuilt, although the community continued to be served by the Detroit and Mackinac Railway.

In April 1922, the community was in danger from significant flooding along the Black River due to very rapid thawing of winter snow and ice along the river. The Tower Dam reservoir overflowed and threatened to flood the community, and the river also broke its banks all the way north to the flooded Black Lake. The dam was also at a significant risk of failing due to the high waters. About 500 feet (150 m) of railroad tracks were swept away in the flood, and a water tower was also destroyed. Tons of rocks and trees were swept away by the flood waters and built up behind the dam, which caused tremendous pressure on the dam and perilous work conditions for the nearly 160 men who worked to clear debris and protect the dam. The railroad also crossed along the dam. If the dam failed, it could have caused an entire collapse of the earthen embankment and would sever the railroad connection to the city of Cheboygan. Although severely weakened, the dam and railroad bridge remained intact, and a new temporary track was installed. However, the weakened roadbed caused a train to derail soon after and plummet down a 20 feet (6.1 m) embankment, which caused further significant damage to the rail line. In 1924, the Detroit and Mackinac Railway ended its railway service in Tower.

=== Recent history ===
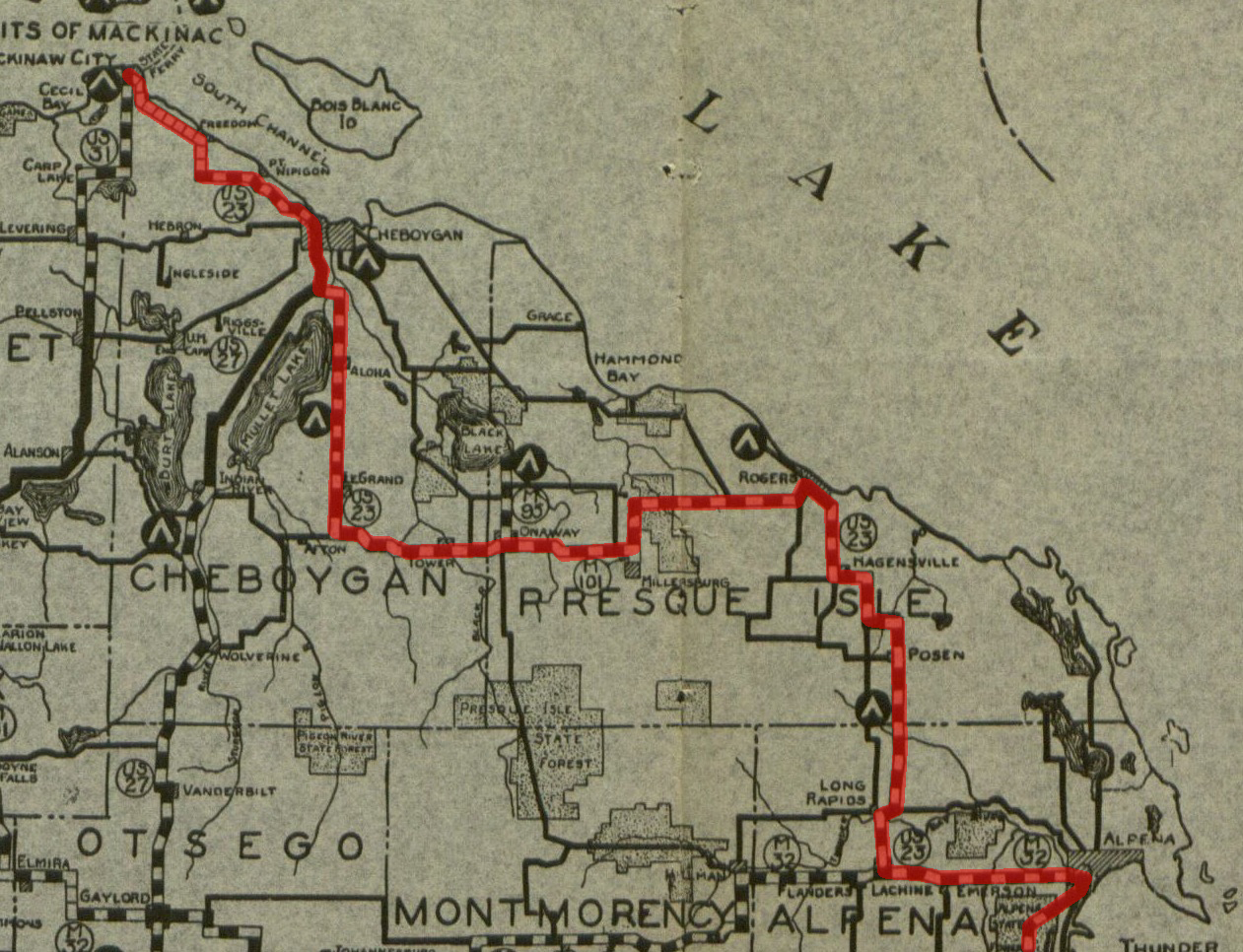
Original route of US 23 running through Tower in 1927

Without direct railway service, Tower benefited from the creation of several highways. Although several early roadways passed through Tower, the creation of U.S. Route 23 (US 23) in late-1926 was the first major highway through the area. The original route of US 23 passed right through Tower. It provided a direct route just north to the village of Mackinaw City and as far south as the state of Ohio. During the 1920s, the lumber industry ceased all operations in the area, and the community of Tower transitioned and sustained as a farming community and stopover for travelers along US 23.

In 1940, US 23 was rerouted to run closer to the Lake Huron shoreline and no longer designated through Tower. The former stretch of US 23 running from Onaway to Afton would be turned over to state control and designated a northerly extension of M-33. In July 1946, this same stretch of highway would also be included as part of M-68 in order to eliminate a gap in that highway's route. The community of Tower would now benefit from travelers along both M-33 and M-68.

In 1949, the Kleber Dam was completed further downstream in order to aid in flood control, as well as provide hydroelectricity. This dam, as well as the Tower Dam, continue to serve as active hydroelectric dams. In 1970, F-05 was one of the first county-designated highways in the state. This roadway begins just east of Tower and runs for 24.5 miles (39.4 km) northwest to provide direct road access from M-33/M-68 to US 23 in the city of Cheboygan.

While the Detroit and Mackinac Railway discontinued rail service in Tower as early as 1924, the rail lines remained in place and were used until the company ceased operation in 1992. At that point the lines were removed and the land was turned over to local control. The community of Tower no longer has any rail lines. By 2011, the state of Michigan had finished converting the former railway into the North Eastern State Trail multi-use rail trail, which runs for 70 miles (110 km) from Alpena to Cheboygan. There is a trailhead located in Tower near the Tower Dam. The next nearest trailheads are Onaway 3.6 miles (5.8 km) to the east and Aloha 13.9 miles (22.4 km) to the north.

During the tornado outbreak of October 17–19, 2007, an EF1 tornado was confirmed to start just west of the community of Tower and traveled for 10.21 miles (16.43 km) northeast toward Black Lake. It was the northernmost of the 63 confirmed tornadoes during the outbreak.

For the 2020 census, Tower was included as a newly listed census-designated place (CDP), which is included for statistical purposes only. It is one of two CDPs in Cheboygan County, along with Indian River. Tower continues to remain an unincorporated community with no legal autonomy of its own. The newly designated CDP recorded a population of 248 at the 2020 census.
