= M-212 (Michigan highway) =

State highway in Aloha Township, Cheboygan County, Michigan, United States

M-212
- Center Street
- M-212 highlighted in red

Route information
- Maintained by MDOT
- Length: 0.732 mi (1,178 m)
- Existed: December 29, 1937–present

Major junctions
- West end: Aloha State Park
- East end: M-33 in Aloha Township

Location
- Country: United States
- State: Michigan
- Counties: Cheboygan

Highway system
- Michigan State Trunkline Highway System; Interstate; US; State; Byways
← M-211	→ M-213

M-212 is a state trunkline highway in the US state of Michigan. It provides access from M-33 to the community of Aloha on Mullett Lake's eastern shore and Aloha State Park, where the highway ends. It is shorter than all other signed highways in the state, including M-143 at 0.936 miles (1.506 km) and the business route, Business M-32 in Hillman at 0.738 miles (1.188 km), which is about 32 feet (9.8 m) longer.

M-212 was assigned on December 29, 1937, from the intersection with Second Street to an intersection with US Highway 23 (US 23). In 1940, the state of Michigan rerouted US 23 and replaced it with M-33.

== Route ==
M-212 begins at an intersection with Second Street and the Tromble Trail north of the Aloha State Park entrance gate. The community was originally a stop on the Detroit and Mackinac Railway, named after a trip to Hawaii by the local sawmill owner. The state highway runs northward on Second Street away from the park gate before turning eastward on Center Street. The railroad right-of-way is now the North Eastern State Trail, which M-212 crosses along Center Street in Aloha. Eastward, the highway intersects Third and Fourth streets, both of which are separated by woodlands and residences. This is followed by a large clearing, giving way to a farm to the north and more residences to the south. Beyond this there is a large field where M-212 terminates at an intersection with M-33 in Aloha Township. According to the Lansing State Journal, "most people could walk the darn thing in about 20 minutes."

== History ==
The Michigan State Highway Department assigned the M-212 designation to its current alignment from what was then US 23 on December 29, 1937. It has broadly remained the same since. Originally, US 23 ran along the highway at the eastern terminus of M-212, but the highway department realigned this along the shore of Lake Huron in 1940 and later assigned M-33 to the old alignment, which remains the case.

M-212 was called a "smidgin" of a highway as part of a group of roadways that lacked the glamor of other highways in a profile of the shortest highways in the state in 1972. In 1996, the highway became the state's shortest when M-209 in the Sleeping Bear Dunes National Lakeshore was transferred to local control and lost its state highway designation. Since M-212 gained this superlative, in 2018 a radio station in Kalamazoo called it "likely" the state's quietest highway, or the highway with the lowest annual average daily traffic.

== Major intersections ==
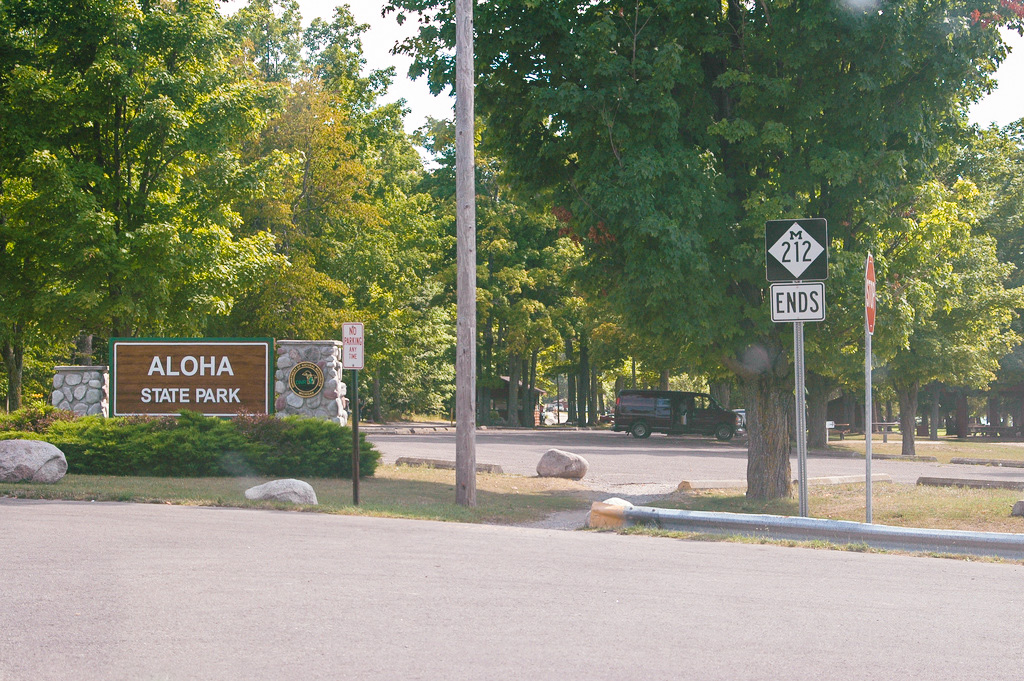
M-212's terminus at the state park

The entire highway is in Aloha Township, Cheboygan County.

mi	km	Destinations	Notes
0.000	0.000	Second Street	Aloha State Park entrance
0.732	1.178	M-33 – Cheboygan, Onaway	
1.000 mi = 1.609 km; 1.000 km = 0.621 mi

== See also ==
- List of shortest state highways in the United States
