= Forest Township, Michigan =

Forest Township is the name of some places in the U.S. state of Michigan:

- Forest Township, Cheboygan County, Michigan
- Forest Township, Genesee County, Michigan
- Forest Township, Missaukee County, Michigan
