= Onaway State Park =

Park in Michigan, USA

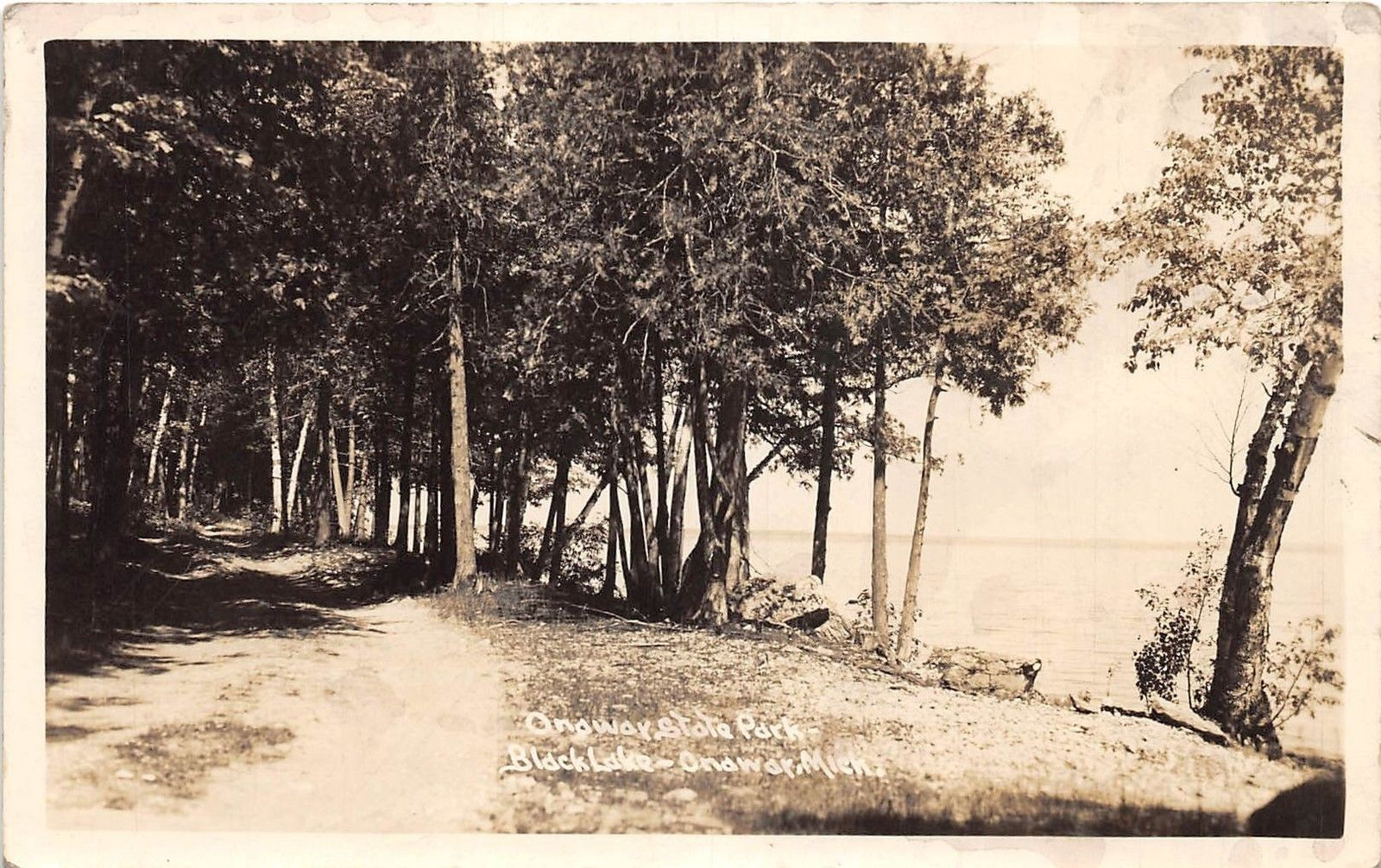
- Onaway State Park c. 1930

- Location within Michigan Location within the United States
- Location: North Allis Township, Presque Isle County, Michigan, United States
- Nearest city: Onaway, Michigan
- Coordinates: 45°26′04″N 84°13′53″W
- Area: 158 acres (64 ha)
- Elevation: 682 feet (208 m)
- Established: 1920
- Administrator: Michigan Department of Natural Resources
- Designation: Michigan state park
- Website: Official website
- Onaway State Park
- U.S. National Register of Historic Places
- Built by: Civilian Conservation Corps
- Architect: Ralph B. Herrick
- NRHP reference No.: 09001066
- Added to NRHP: December 8, 2009

Onaway State Park is a public recreation area covering 158 acres (64 ha) on the southeast shore of Black Lake in North Allis Township, Presque Isle County, Michigan. The state parks sits at the end of M-211 five miles north of Onaway. It contains sand and cobblestone beaches, large rock outcroppings, a campground, and nature trail highlighting a diversity of trees. The park was added to the National Register of Historic Places in 2009.

== History ==
Dedicated in 1921, Onaway was one of 13 parks established in 1920 after the Michigan State Park Commission was created to acquire lands for state parks in 1919. In 1920, Presque Isle County deeded 150 acres of land to the state for this purpose. The acreage included a city park then known as "The Indian Orchard" and some surrounding private lands. In 1921, the state began developing the park, adding two small bathhouses and toilet facilities to the picnic pavilion already in place. The two existing farmhouses were remodeled for use as a park store and manager's residence. In 1924, an entranceway and campgrounds were installed, and in 1927, a campground loop road was installed. A new residence was constructed after the original one burned in 1931.

In 1933, the Civilian Conservation Corps (CCC) established a camp at Black Lake, with 15 men assigned to Onaway State Park. They regraded the entrance road and installed a foot trail, and the next year began excavation of a basement for the already existing pavilion. In 1935 and 1936, a 100-space parking area was created and a stone campground toilet, designed by Ralph B. Herrick, was erected. In 1937, the pavilion was remodeled (also to a design by Ralph B. Herrick) and stone shelters added. In 1942, the campground was expanded.

After the CCC disbanded, sanitation infrastructure was added in the 1960s, and more campsites were added in 1969. The roads were paved in 1970.

== Description ==
Onaway State Park consists of a picnic area, a beach and day use area, and a campground. The campground area is divided into two sections. The lower campground was created in 1923, and campsite separation barriers (of logs, boulders, or concrete) were installed by CCC workers in the 1930s. A 1937 toilet building in the lower campground is constructed with limestone lower walls and log upper walls. The 1942 upper campground is located atop a bluff above the lower campground. The sites are heavily shaded, and the drives are angled.

The picnic area has picnic tables and grills scattered through a shady grass area. The beach contains a pavilion/bathhouse dating from c. 1917. It is a log structure with a hipped roof and wraparound porch. A basement beneath was excavated in 1934, and is constructed of stone. Additional exterior renovations by the CCC added a stone fireplace and modified the porch.

The park also contains the remnants of an Indian burial ground, called the Rainy River Cemetery (20PI35). No archaeological investigation of this site has been performed.

== Activities and amenities ==
The park offers fishing, swimming, picnicking facilities, boat launch, three miles of hiking trails, playground, cabin, and 82-site campground.
