= M-211 (Michigan highway) =

State highway in Presque Isle County, Michigan, United States

M-211
- M-211 highlighted in red

Route information
- Maintained by MDOT
- Length: 5.147 mi (8.283 km)
- Existed: 1934–present

Major junctions
- South end: M-68 in Onaway
- North end: Onaway State Park near Onaway

Location
- Country: United States
- State: Michigan
- Counties: Presque Isle

Highway system
- Michigan State Trunkline Highway System; Interstate; US; State; Byways
← M-209	→ M-212

M-211 is a state trunkline highway in the Lower Peninsula (LP) of Michigan that connects the community of Onaway with Onaway State Park. The highway runs through farmland and forests along the 5.174-mile (8.327 km) route to the park. The trunkline was originally designated M-95 from 1919 until 1934. In that year, the designation was moved to a different highway in the Upper Peninsula (UP), and the state park connector was given the current number. The highway was last changed by 1960 when paving was completed.

== Route description ==
M-211 is a two-lane highway that starts at M-68 in downtown Onaway. The trunkline runs north out of town on Main Street past business and residences. It crosses the North Eastern State Trail and passes the Leo E. Getz County Airport north of town. M-211 enters an area of farmland north of the airport. As it continues north and approaches Onaway State Park, the terrain transitions to forest land. M-211 ends at the intersection with Bonz Beach Highway in front of the state park gate. All of M-211 is undivided highway.

Like other state highways in Michigan, M-211 is maintained by the Michigan Department of Transportation (MDOT). In 2010, the department's traffic surveys showed that on average, 1,429 vehicles used the highway in the city of Onaway and 1,254 vehicles did so north of the city line to the state park. No section of M-211 is listed on the National Highway System, a network of roads important to the country's economy, defense, and mobility.

== History ==
When the state highway system was initially signposted in 1919, The highway that ran north from M-10 at Onaway toward Black Lake was numbered M-95. By 1934, the highway was redesignated M-211 to free up the M-95 number. At the time, a highway in the UP was numbered M-45, but US Highway 45 was being extended into Michigan. The Michigan State Highway Department renumbered M-45 in the UP as M-95, and M-95 in the LP as M-211. By the middle of 1960, all of the current M-211 was paved. The highway has remained unchanged since.

== Major intersections ==
The entire highway is in Presque Isle County.

Location	mi	km	Destinations	Notes
Onaway	0.000	0.000	M-68 – Indian River, Rogers City	
North Allis Township	5.174	8.327	Bonz Beach Highway	Onaway State Park gate
1.000 mi = 1.609 km; 1.000 km = 0.621 mi
