= List of shortest state highways in the United States =

In the United States, each state maintains its own state highway system. This is a list of the shortest state highways in each state.

== List of highways ==
Shortest state highways by state
State	Highway	mi	km	References
Alabama	State Route 151	0.404	0.650	
Alaska	Route 98	13.4	21.6	
Arizona	State Route 90 Spur	0.420	0.676	
Arkansas	Highway 935	0.1	0.16	
California	Route 275	0.14	0.23	
Colorado	State Highway 110	0.186	0.299	
Connecticut	Connecticut Route 78	0.43	0.69	
Delaware	Route 491	0.36	0.58	
District of Columbia	Route 295	4.29	6.90	(Note: DC 295 is the only non-national route in the district.)
Florida	State Road 525	0.101	0.163	
Georgia	State Route 274	1.2	1.9	
Georgia	State Route 260	1.2	1.9	
Hawaii	Route 7714	0.086	0.138	
Idaho	State Highway 79	0.257	0.414	
Illinois	Route 35	2.42	3.89	
Indiana	State Road 520	0.248	0.399	
Iowa	Iowa 903	0.740	1.191	
Kansas	K-247	0.123	0.198	
Kentucky	Route 2920	0.013	0.021	
Louisiana	Highway 897-5	0.050	0.080	
Maine	State Route 206	1.57	2.53	
Maryland	Route 939	0.01	0.016	
Maryland	Route 963	0.01	0.016	
Maryland	Route 990	0.01	0.016	
Massachusetts	Route 15	0.23	0.37	
Michigan	M-212	0.732	1.178	
Minnesota	MN 121	0.937	1.508	
Minnesota	MN 322 (former)	0.13	0.21	
Mississippi	MS 702	0.255	0.410	
Missouri	Route 117	0.260	0.418	
Montana	Highway 68	1.494	2.404	
Nebraska	N-110	2.26	3.64	
Nevada	State Route 781	0.039	0.063	
New Hampshire	Route 141	2.172	3.495	
New Jersey	Route 59	0.15	0.24	
New Mexico	State Road 446	0.250	0.402	
New York	State Route 437	0.30	0.48	
North Carolina	Highway 400	0.63	1.01	
North Dakota	Highway 91	0.523	0.842	
Ohio	State Route 822	0.13	0.21	
Oklahoma	Highway 98S	0.10	0.16	
Oregon (Note: Oregon uses signed numbered state routes and unsigned named state highways.)	Route 251	0.76	1.22	
Oregon	Payette Spur Highway No. 492	0.07	0.11	
Pennsylvania	Route 299	0.052	0.084	
Rhode Island	Route 114A	0.4	0.64	
South Carolina	Highway 179	0.670	1.078	
South Dakota	Highway 20 Spur	0.458	0.737	
Tennessee	State Route 447	0.159	0.256	
Texas	State Highway 165	0.512	0.824	
Utah	State Route 231	0.085	0.137	
Vermont	Route 26	0.013	0.021	
Virginia	State Route 300Y	0.04	0.064	
Washington	State Route 213	0.630	1.014	
West Virginia	Route 807	0.3	0.48	
Wisconsin	Highway 243	0.30	0.48	
Wyoming	Highway 224	0.12	0.19	

== See also ==
- List of longest state highways in the United States
