= Ellen May Tower =

- Born: 8 May 1868; Byron, Michigan, US
- Died: 9 December 1898 (aged 30); Puerto Rico
- Burial place: Byron, Michigan, US
- Occupation: U.S. Army nurse

Ellen May Tower (May 8, 1868 – December 9, 1898) was a U.S. Army nurse who died in the Spanish-American War and was the first woman to receive a military funeral in Michigan. The community of Tower, Michigan, was named in her honor in 1899.

== Biography ==
Tower was born in Byron, Michigan, on May 8, 1868, the daughter of Civil War Captain Samuel Tower and his wife Sarah. By all accounts, she attended the Chaffee School, the Byron Village School, and then a nurse's training program at Detroit's Grace Hospital.

For several years, Tower worked at the Michigan School for the Blind until, on April 21, 1898, she volunteered for the U.S. Army as a nurse, just three days before Spain declared war against the United States, a conflict now known as the Spanish–American War. Tower took her oath on September 1, 1898, and was sent for her first official training to Camp Wikoff, located at Montauk Point, New York." There, she and 17 other Army nurses cared for sick and injured soldiers who had been returned to the United States to recuperate. During her time in New York she became known as a "Camp Wikoff Angel."

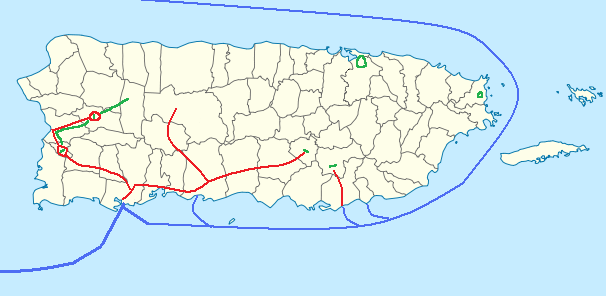
Historical map of the Puerto Rican Campaign illustrating military operations July 25–August 12, 1898, and showing Municipality borders in 1898. Blue lines show U.S. Navy forces. Red lines show U.S. land forces. Green lines show Spanish ground forces.

In late September, she volunteered for duty in the Puerto Rico Campaign and was soon dispatched. However, during that war approximately 90 percent of the American casualties resulted from disease, not from warfare. After only 10 weeks of duty abroad, she died of typhoid fever "in a hospital tent" on December 9, 1898. She was 30 years old.

The war officially ended the next day, on December 10, with the signature of the Treaty of Paris.

Tower's remains were delivered to Detroit on January 15, 1899, and her funeral in Byron took place on January 17, attended by "thousands of military servicemen, villagers and visitors." The eulogy was delivered by Dr. Sterling, who had awarded Tower her nursing diploma only five years earlier, to the day.

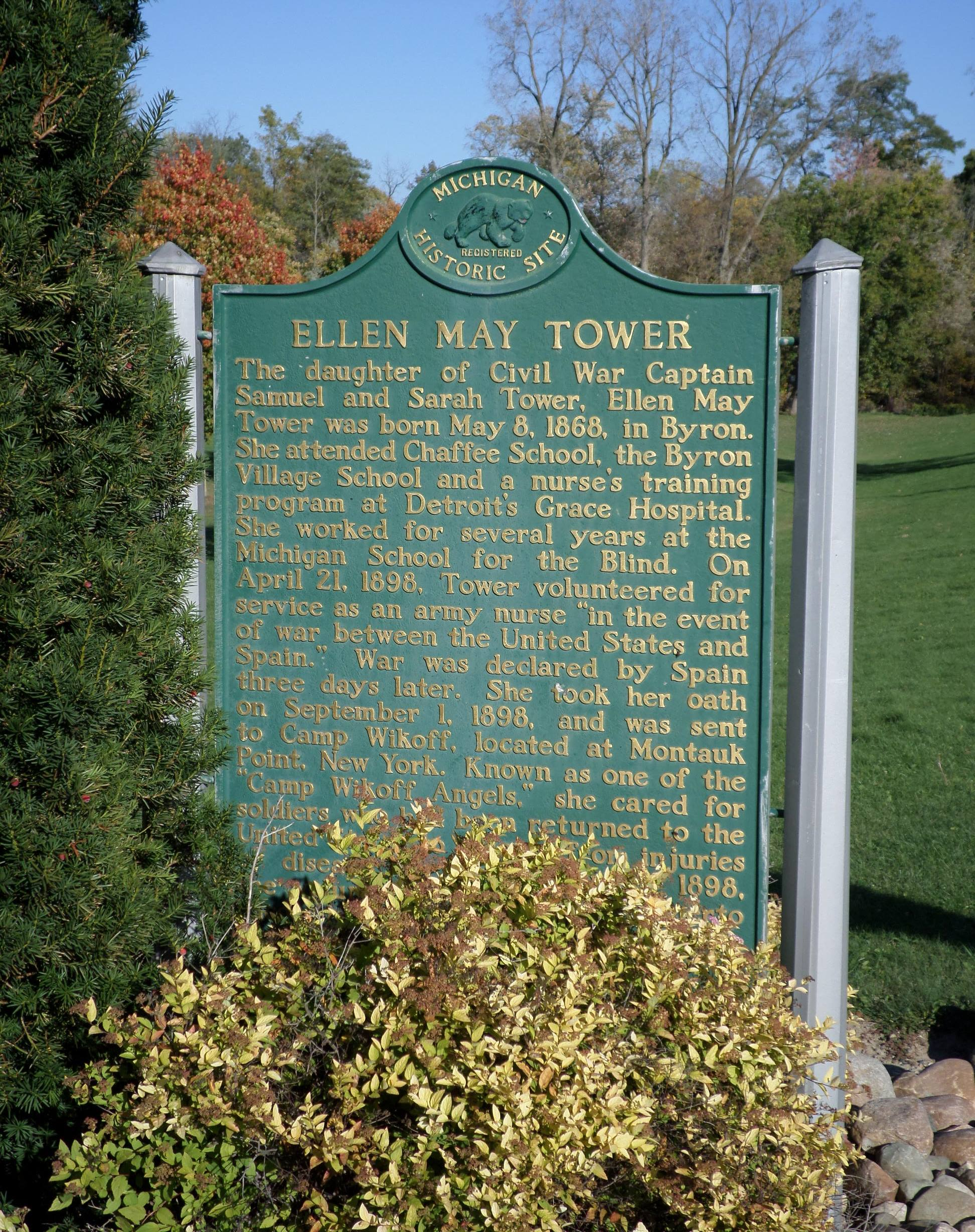
Michigan historical marker

She was the first Army nurse to die on foreign soil and she was the first women to receive a military funeral in Michigan. An elaborate monument was erected in her honor in an old cemetery in Byron which is located in the southeast corner of Shiawassee County.

=== Honors ===
The community of Tower, Michigan was named for her when it was founded in 1899, shortly after her death.

=== Historical marker ===
In 1989, a Michigan historical marker was placed at 312 West Maple Street, Byron in her honor.
