= Aloha State Park =

Park in Michigan, USA

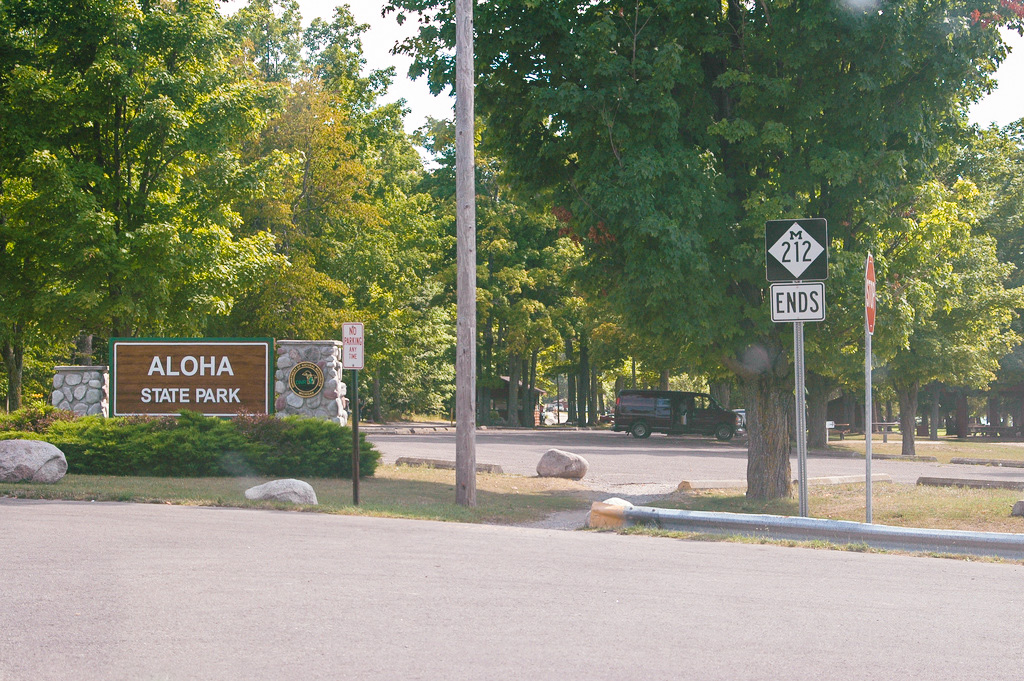
- Park entrance at the end of M-212

- Location within Michigan Location within the United States
- Location: Aloha Township, Cheboygan County, Michigan, United States
- Nearest city: Cheboygan, Michigan
- Coordinates: 45°31′10″N 84°27′53″W
- Area: 172 acres (69.6 ha)
- Elevation: 597 feet (182 m)
- Established: 1923
- Administrator: Michigan Department of Natural Resources
- Designation: Michigan state park
- Website: Official website

Aloha State Park is a public recreation area located six miles (9.7 km) south of Cheboygan in Cheboygan County, Michigan. The state park covers 172 acres (70 ha) on the northeast side of Mullett Lake at the center of the Inland Lakes Waterways.

== History ==
The park was created when Cheboygan County purchased an initial eight acres of abandoned land that had been a park created by the Detroit and Mackinac Railway. The county added another twenty acres to that holding in order to reach the 28-acre minimum required for the establishment of a state park. All of it was donated to the state in 1923.

== Activities and amenities ==
The park offers camping, boating, swimming, and fishing, and is skirted by the North Eastern State Trail. The trail preserves the roadbed of the railroad that set aside the parcel of land used to help create the park.
