= Black Lake (Michigan) =

Lake in the state of Michigan, United States

- Location within Michigan Location within the United States
- Location: Cheboygan County, Michigan, United States
- Coordinates: 45°27′30″N 84°16′04″W
- Primary outflows: Black River
- Basin countries: United States
- Surface area: 10,130 acres (4,100 ha)
- Max. depth: 50 ft (15 m)
- Surface elevation: 610 feet (190 m)

Black Lake is located in Cheboygan and Presque Isle counties in northern lower Michigan, United States. It is Michigan's seventh-largest inland lake with a surface area of 10,130 acres (41.0 km2)10,130 acres (41.0 km^{2}). The largest body of water in the Black River watershed is drained through the Lower Black and Cheboygan rivers into Lake Huron. Black Lake is a summer destination for many families from the suburban Detroit area, other nearby states, and residents of the neighboring town of Onaway.

Onaway State Park offers camping, swimming and fishing at the lake's southeastern end. Its buildings, built during the Great Depression by the Civilian Conservation Corps, have been deemed eligible for inclusion in the National Register of Historic Places.

Businesses on or near the lake include the Black River Marina, the Bluffs Restaurant and the 211 Outpost. Since the late 1960s, the United Auto Workers Union has maintained the Walter and May Reuther Family Education Center on a former private estate site.

Black Lake is noted for its unusual fishing season. A limited lake sturgeon ice fishing season is permitted in the winter. The fishery is limited to six total fish taken each year, each over 36 inches and taken through the ice with fishing spears. Each day, 25 anglers are chosen by lottery and given a flag to raise when they have caught a fish. When five flags have been raised, the season is closed for the year. In 2025, the season lasted only 17 minutes — the shortest on record.

== History ==
- The area's early history was dominated by lumbering and mining. The remains of a long-abandoned limestone quarry are still visible on the lake's south shore.
- The Black Lake Association, founded in 1920, works to maintain the lake's water quality, to promote and improve its walleye and sturgeon fisheries, keep its members informed about environmental issues that affect them, their property, and the lake itself, and maintain a record of the lake's vital statistics.
- During the October 17, 2007, tornado outbreak, Black Lake was impacted by an EF1 tornado that lasted 10 minutes on the ground. No deaths were recorded, but a barn and some land were partially ruined in the wake.

== See also ==
- List of lakes in Michigan
