= Forest Township, Cheboygan County, Michigan =

Forest Township, Michigan
- Civil township
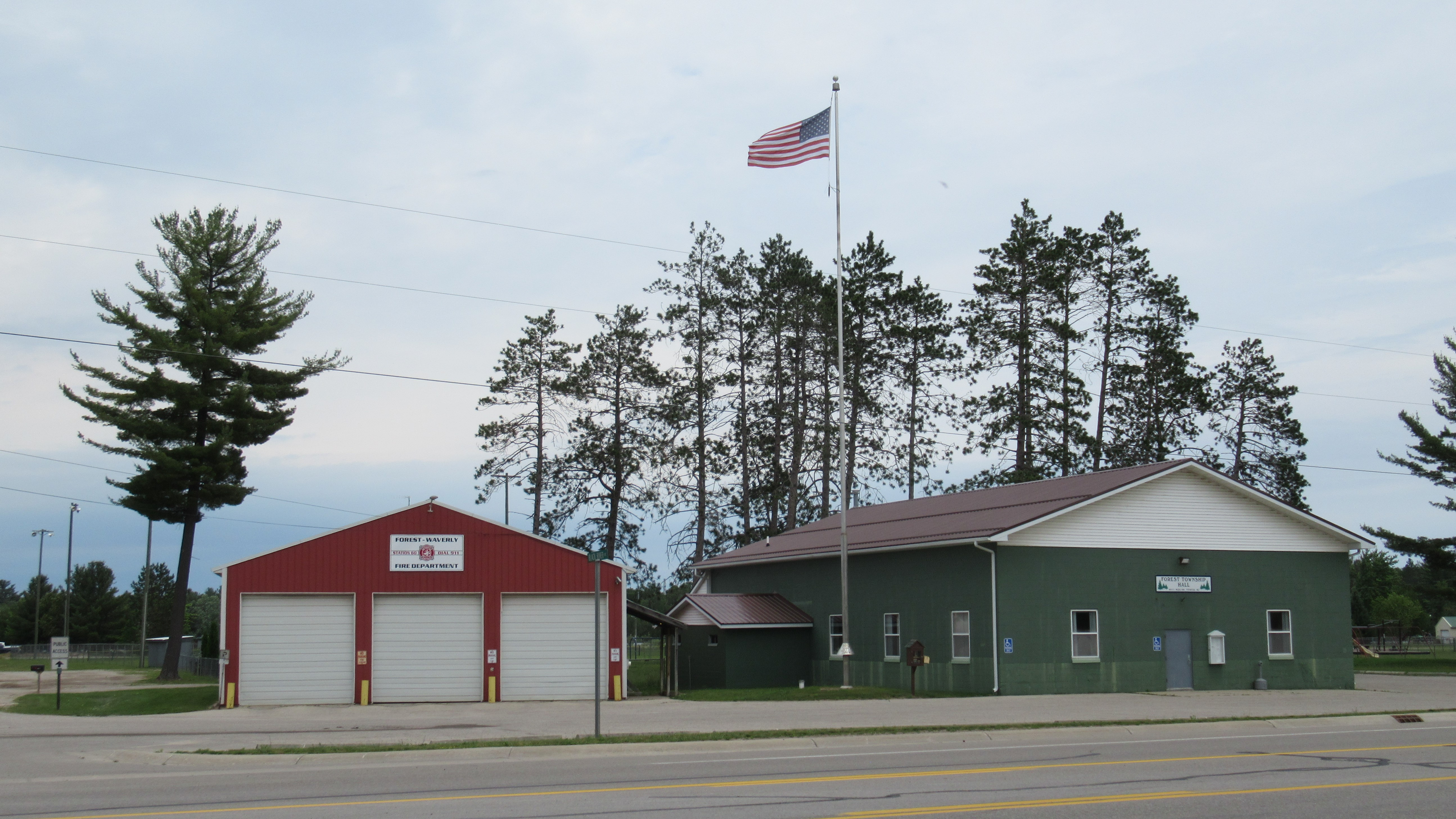
- Forest Township Hall and Forest–Waverly Fire Department in the community of Tower

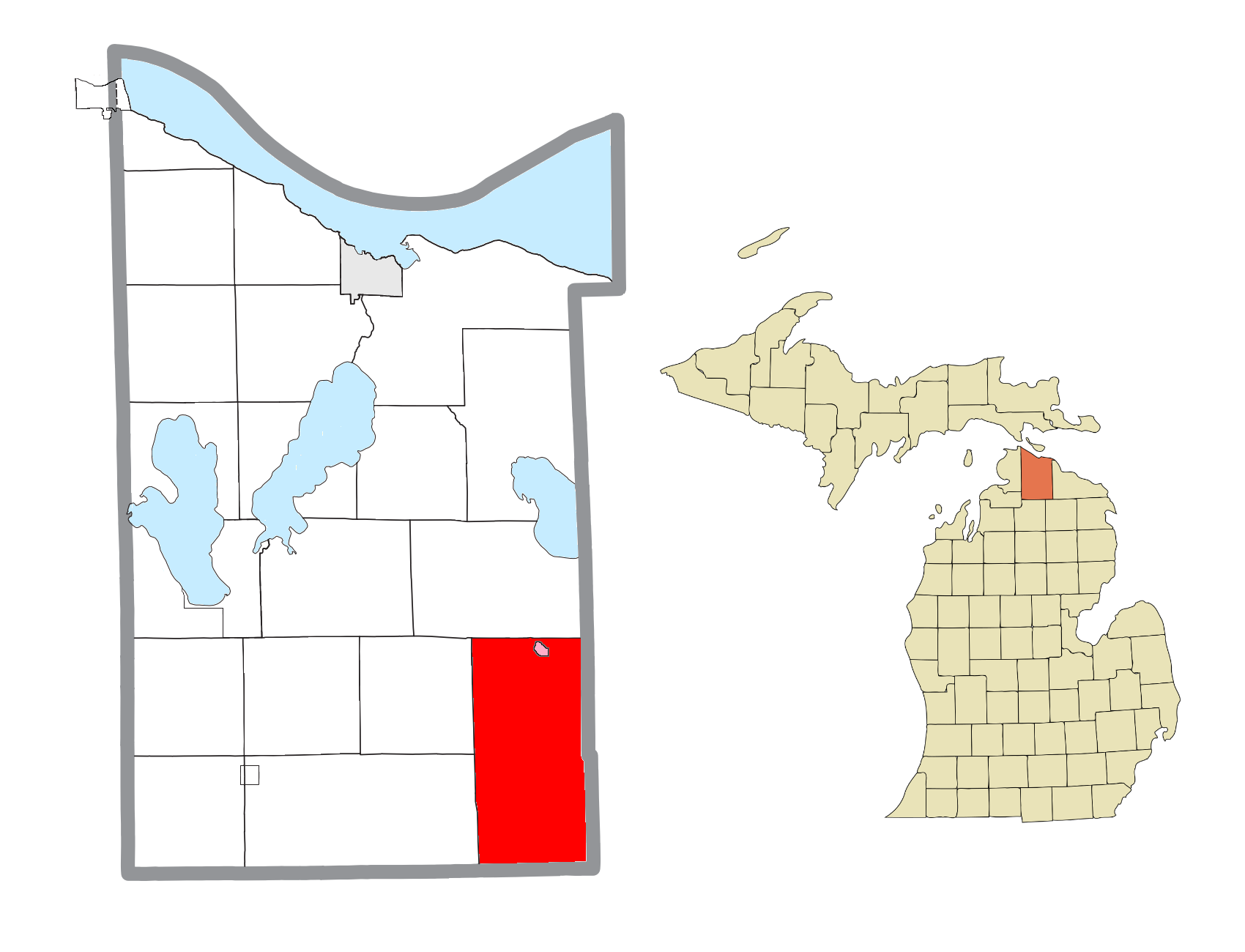
- Location within Cheboygan County (red) and the administered CDP of Tower (pink)

- Location in the state of Michigan Location within the United States
- Coordinates: 45°17′27″N 84°17′58″W
- Country: United States
- State: Michigan
- County: Cheboygan
- Established: 1887

Government
  - Supervisor: Harry Waldie
  - Clerk: Melinda Hambleton

Area
  - Total: 69.52 sq mi (180.06 km^{2})
  - Land: 68.59 sq mi (177.65 km^{2})
  - Water: 0.93 sq mi (2.41 km^{2})
- Elevation: 863 ft (263 m)

Population (2020)
  - Total: 977
  - Density: 14.2/sq mi (5.5/km^{2})
- Time zone: UTC-5 (Eastern (EST))
  - Summer (DST): UTC-4 (EDT)
- ZIP code(s): 49765 (Onaway); 49792 (Tower)
- Area code: 231
- FIPS code: 26-29400
- GNIS feature ID: 1626293

Forest Township is a civil township of Cheboygan County in the U.S. state of Michigan. The population was 977 at the 2020 census.

== Communities ==
- Tower is an unincorporated community and census-designated place in the township on M-33/M-68 just west of the Upper Black River at 45°21′19″N 84°18′02″W.

== Geography ==
Forest Township occupies the southeastern corner of Cheboygan County and is bordered by Presque Isle County to the east and Montmorency County to the south. According to the United States Census Bureau, the township has a total area of 69.5 square miles (180.1 km^{2}), of which 68.6 square miles (177.6 km^{2}) is land and 0.93 square miles (2.4 km^{2}), or 1.34%, is water.

== Demographics ==
As of the census of 2000, there were 1,080 people, 431 households, and 318 families residing in the township. The population density was 15.7 inhabitants per square mile (6.1/km^{2}). There were 620 housing units at an average density of 9.0 per square mile (3.5/km^{2}). The racial makeup of the township was 96.48% White, 0.46% African American, 0.56% Native American, 0.56% Asian, 0.28% from other races, and 1.67% from two or more races. Hispanic or Latino of any race were 0.46% of the population.

There were 431 households, out of which 28.1% had children under the age of 18 living with them, 60.6% were married couples living together, 8.8% had a female householder with no husband present, and 26.0% were non-families. 20.9% of all households were made up of individuals, and 9.3% had someone living alone who was 65 years of age or older. The average household size was 2.51 and the average family size was 2.86.

In the township the population was spread out, with 23.7% under the age of 18, 7.4% from 18 to 24, 24.3% from 25 to 44, 28.1% from 45 to 64, and 16.6% who were 65 years of age or older. The median age was 42 years. For every 100 females, there were 103.8 males. For every 100 females age 18 and over, there were 104.0 males.

The median income for a household in the township was $28,424, and the median income for a family was $30,833. Males had a median income of $28,611 versus $20,288 for females. The per capita income for the township was $15,373. About 15.2% of families and 17.5% of the population were below the poverty line, including 29.3% of those under age 18 and 9.8% of those age 65 or over.
