= Aloha Township, Michigan =

- Civil township
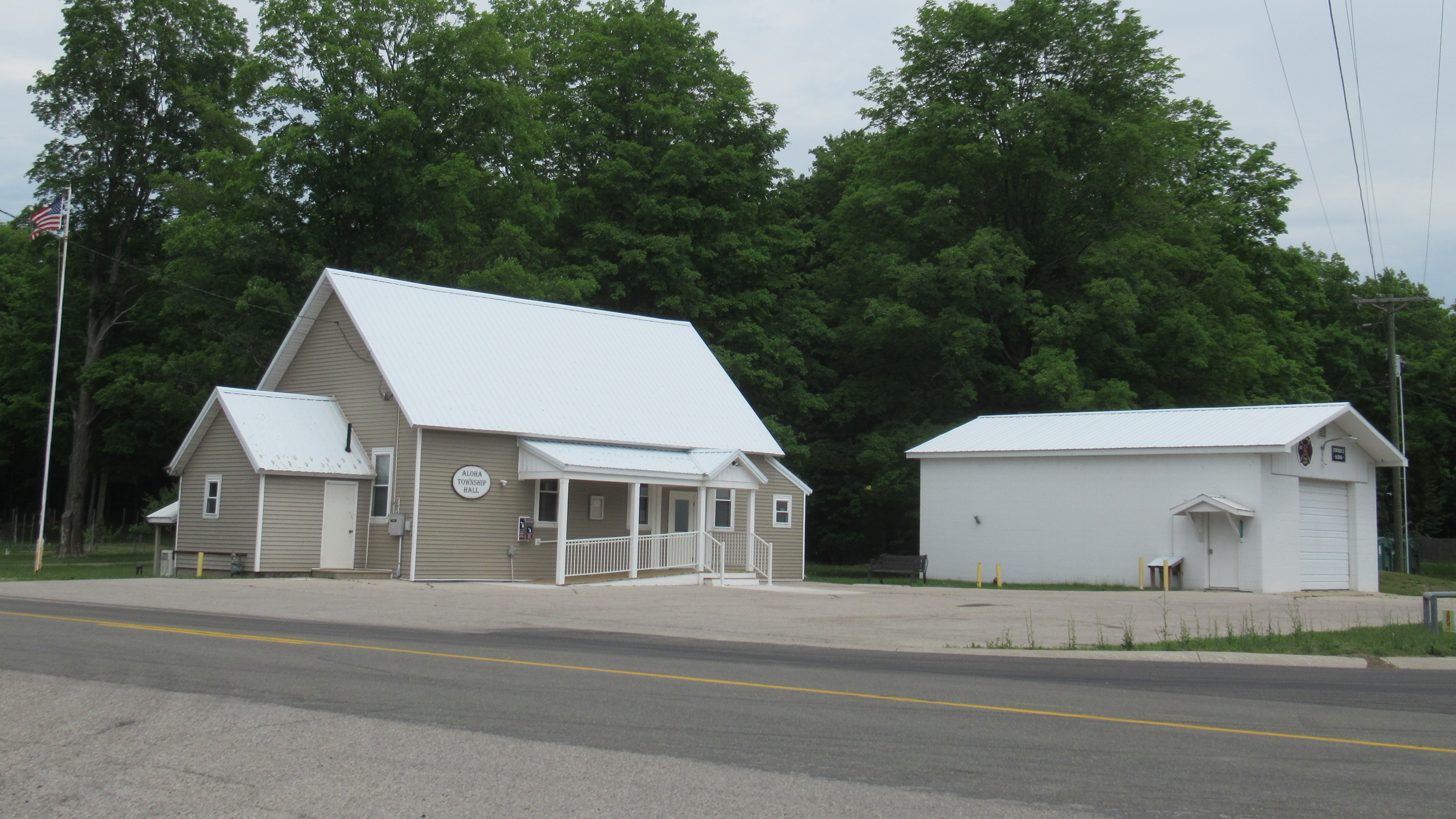
- Aloha Township Hall and fire department

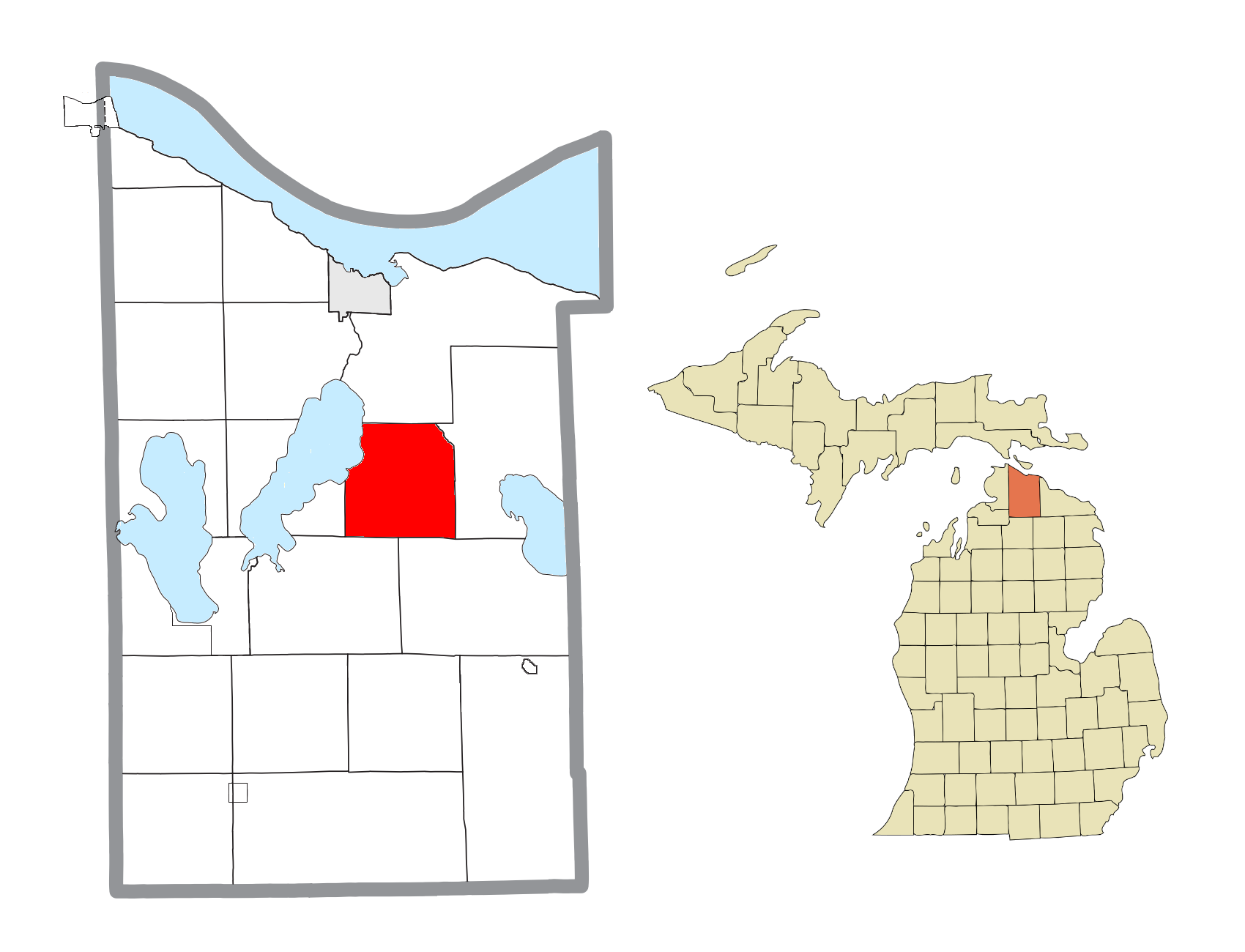
- Location within Cheboygan County

- Location within the state of Michigan Location within the United States
- Coordinates: 45°29′48″N 84°25′12″W
- Country: United States
- State: Michigan
- County: Cheboygan
- Established: 1907

Government
  - Supervisor: Charles Maziasz
  - Clerk: Teresa Sullivan

Area
  - Total: 32.38 sq mi (83.86 km^{2})
  - Land: 29.50 sq mi (76.40 km^{2})
  - Water: 2.88 sq mi (7.46 km^{2})
- Elevation: 636 ft (194 m)

Population (2020)
  - Total: 937
  - Density: 31.8/sq mi (12.3/km^{2})
- Time zone: UTC-5 (Eastern (EST))
  - Summer (DST): UTC-4 (EDT)
- ZIP code(s): 49721 (Cheboygan); 49749 (Indian River)
- Area code: 231
- FIPS code: 26-01720
- GNIS feature ID: 1625831
- Website: Official website

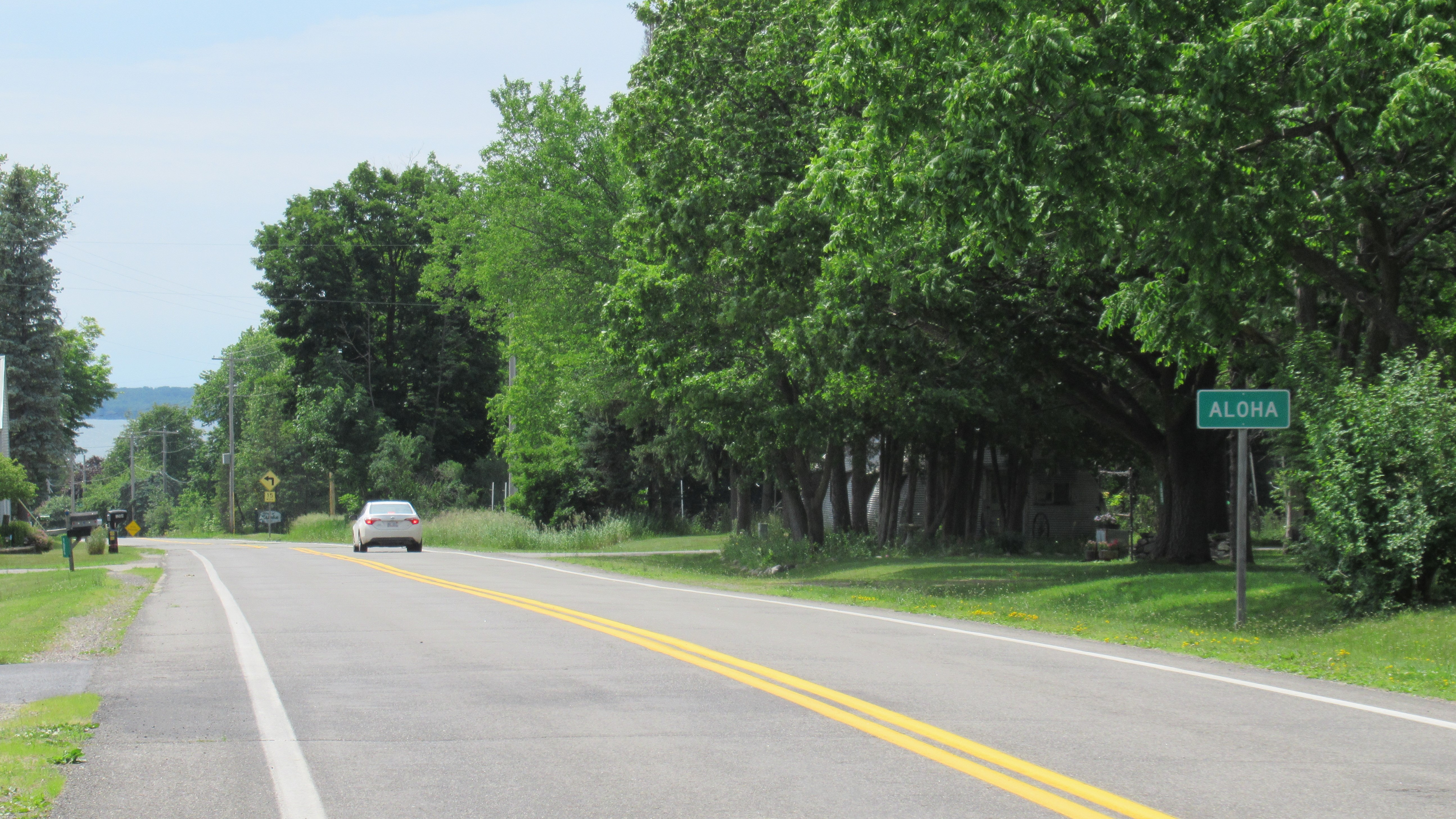
Community of Aloha along M-212

Aloha Township is a civil township of Cheboygan County in the U.S. state of Michigan. The population was 937 at the 2020 census.

== Communities ==
- Aloha is an unincorporated community on the east shore of Mullett Lake at 45°31′35″N 84°28′00″W. It is on M-212, which is a short spur off M-33, about 8 miles (13 km) south of Cheboygan. Aloha State Park is just to the south. The settlement formed around the James B. Patterson sawmill and the F. Hout general store. It was a station on the Detroit and Mackinac Railway, now the North Eastern State Trail. The name was selected by mill owner Patterson, who had made a trip to Hawaii. A post office opened on December 17, 1903, with Lillian Hout as the first postmaster. The post office closed on October 12, 1942.

== Geography ==
According to the U.S. Census Bureau, the township has a total area of 32.38 square miles (83.86 km^{2}), of which 29.50 square miles (76.40 km^{2}) is land and 2.88 square miles (7.46 km^{2}) (8.89%) is water.

== Demographics ==
As of the census of 2000, there were 1,041 people, 423 households, and 321 families residing in the township. The population density was 35.4 inhabitants per square mile (13.7/km^{2}). There were 670 housing units at an average density of 22.8 per square mile (8.8/km^{2}). The racial makeup of the township was 95.29% White, 2.50% Native American, 0.38% Asian, 0.10% from other races, and 1.73% from two or more races. Hispanic or Latino of any race were 0.38% of the population.

There were 423 households, out of which 27.0% had children under the age of 18 living with them, 70.0% were married couples living together, 3.5% had a female householder with no husband present, and 23.9% were non-families. 19.9% of all households were made up of individuals, and 9.5% had someone living alone who was 65 years of age or older. The average household size was 2.45 and the average family size was 2.80.

In the township the population was spread out, with 23.8% under the age of 18, 3.8% from 18 to 24, 23.0% from 25 to 44, 30.7% from 45 to 64, and 18.6% who were 65 years of age or older. The median age was 45 years. For every 100 females, there were 105.3 males. For every 100 females age 18 and over, there were 106.5 males.

The median income for a household in the township was $34,853, and the median income for a family was $41,406. Males had a median income of $32,955 versus $22,206 for females. The per capita income for the township was $18,656. About 9.6% of families and 13.9% of the population were below the poverty line, including 17.1% of those under age 18 and 8.9% of those age 65 or over.
