= Burns Township, Michigan =

- Civil township
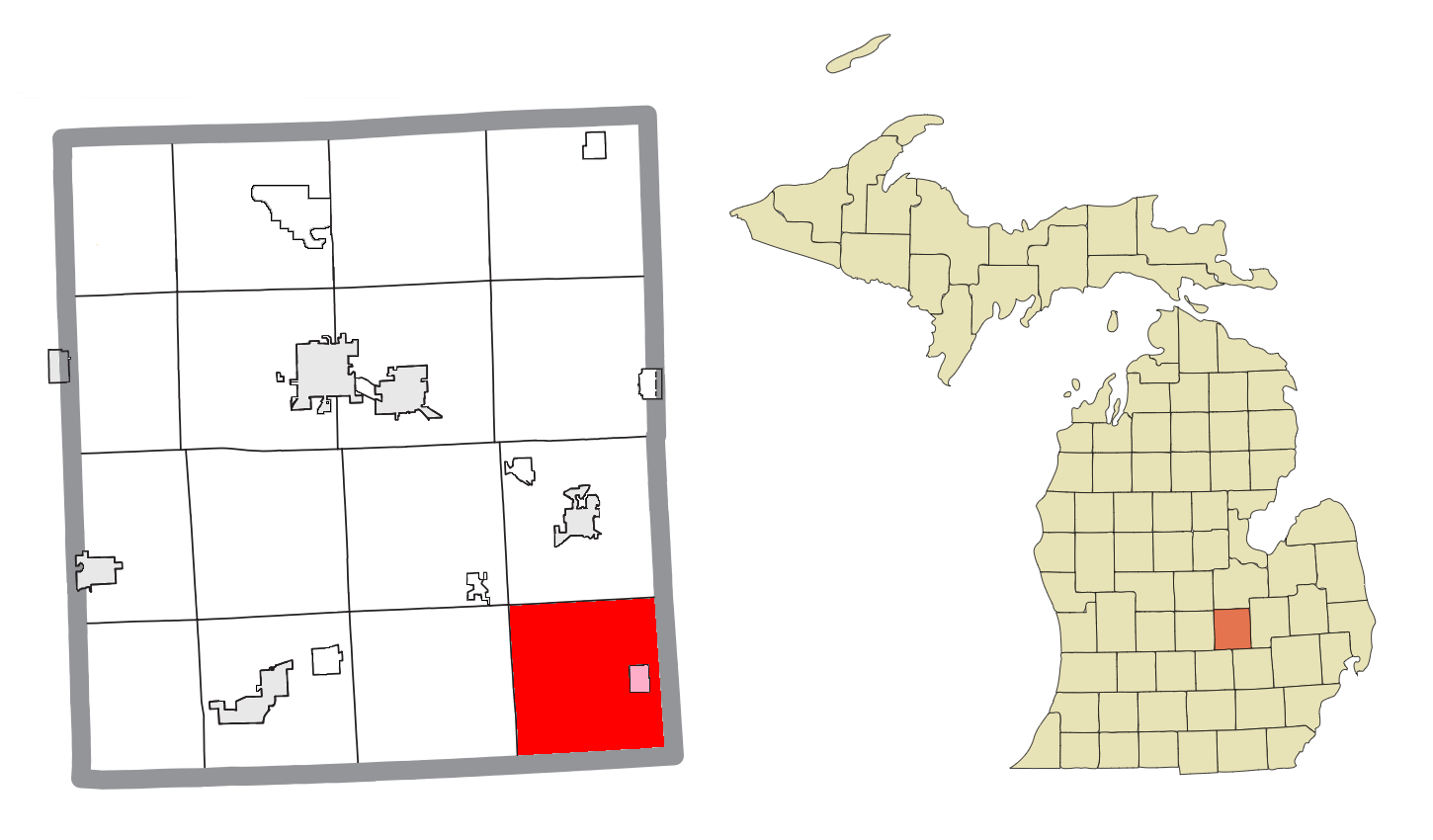
- Location within Shiawassee County (red) and the administered village of Byron (pink)

- Location within the state of Michigan Burns Township (the United States)
- Coordinates: 42°49′40″N 83°58′55″W
- Country: United States
- State: Michigan
- County: Shiawassee
- Organized: 1835

Government
  - Supervisor: Brad Howard
  - Clerk: Shirley Riley

Area
  - Total: 35.91 sq mi (93.0 km^{2})
  - Land: 35.30 sq mi (91.4 km^{2})
  - Water: 0.61 sq mi (1.6 km^{2})
- Elevation: 850 ft (259 m)

Population (2020)
  - Total: 3,280
  - Density: 92.9/sq mi (35.9/km^{2})
- Time zone: UTC-5 (Eastern (EST))
  - Summer (DST): UTC-4 (EDT)
- ZIP code(s): 48414 (Bancroft); 48418 (Byron); 48429 (Durand); 48436 (Gaines)
- Area code: 989
- FIPS code: 26-11880
- GNIS feature ID: 1625137
- Website: Official website

Burns Township is a civil township of Shiawassee County in the U.S. state of Michigan. As of the 2020 census, the township population was 3,280.

== History ==
Whitmore Knaggs established a trading post here in 1820 to exchange goods for furs with the local Ojibwe. The township was organized in 1835.

== Communities ==
- Byron is a village located within the township.
- Union Plains is an unincorporated community within the township at Grand River Road and Reed Road. 42°49′47″N 84°00′46″W

== Geography ==
According to the United States Census Bureau, the township has a total area of 35.91 square miles (93.01 km^{2}), of which 35.30 square miles (91.43 km^{2}) is land and 0.61 square miles (1.58 km^{2}) (1.70%) is water.

The Shiawassee River runs through Burns Township.

== Demographics ==
As of the census of 2000, there were 3,500 people, 1,191 households, and 993 families residing in the township. The population density was 98.6 inhabitants per square mile (38.1/km^{2}). There were 1,230 housing units at an average density of 34.7 per square mile (13.4/km^{2}). The racial makeup of the township was 97.91% White, 0.03% African American, 0.43% Native American, 0.17% Asian, 0.06% from other races, and 1.40% from two or more races. Hispanic or Latino of any race were 1.51% of the population.

There were 1,191 households, out of which 40.4% had children under the age of 18 living with them, 70.2% were married couples living together, 7.6% had a female householder with no husband present, and 16.6% were non-families. 13.8% of all households were made up of individuals, and 5.2% had someone living alone who was 65 years of age or older. The average household size was 2.94 and the average family size was 3.20.

In the township the population was spread out, with 29.2% under the age of 18, 7.3% from 18 to 24, 30.5% from 25 to 44, 23.9% from 45 to 64, and 9.2% who were 65 years of age or older. The median age was 35 years. For every 100 females, there were 104.0 males. For every 100 females age 18 and over, there were 100.0 males.

The median income for a household in the township was $49,671, and the median income for a family was $52,888. Males had a median income of $43,611 versus $24,730 for females. The per capita income for the township was $19,622. About 3.3% of families and 5.5% of the population were below the poverty line, including 8.5% of those under age 18 and 0.9% of those age 65 or over.
