= Presque Isle County Advance =

Newspaper in Michigan, USA

- Type: Weekly newspaper
- Owner(s): Richard and Riconda Lamb
- Editor: Peter Jakey
- Founded: 1878
- Headquarters: Rogers City, MI
- Circulation: 3,371 (as of 2022)
- Website: piadvance.com

Presque Isle County Advance is a weekly community newspaper that was founded in 1878 by local pioneer Fredrick Denny Larke. It is the most widely read newspaper in Presque Isle County. It is published by Presque Isle Newspapers, which also publishes the Onaway Outlook. The papers are produced from its offices in Rogers City and Onaway, Michigan and serve Presque Isle County, Michigan in the USA. The Presque Isle County Advance covers local news, sports, business and community events.

Hal Whiteley served as editor from 1912 until 1962 giving way to his son Harry H. Whiteley, who guided the newspaper until he sold it in 1986 to Richard Milliman.

Presque Isle Newspapers is owned by Richard and Riconda Lamb, who purchased the operation from the Richard Milliman family of Lansing in 1998. Richard had worked as general manager for Mr. Milliman since 1989 when Richard moved back to Rogers City, his hometown.

Following a February 12, 2006 fire which destroyed its historic building in Rogers City, the newspaper was forced to move to a temporary location for 10 months. Due to the efforts from the staff and a supportive community, the newspaper did not miss an issue: it went to press three days after the fire and continued publishing each week after that. In December 2006 the newspaper moved into its new office at the corner of Third and Erie Streets in Rogers City.
