= Byron, Michigan =

- Village
- Village of Byron
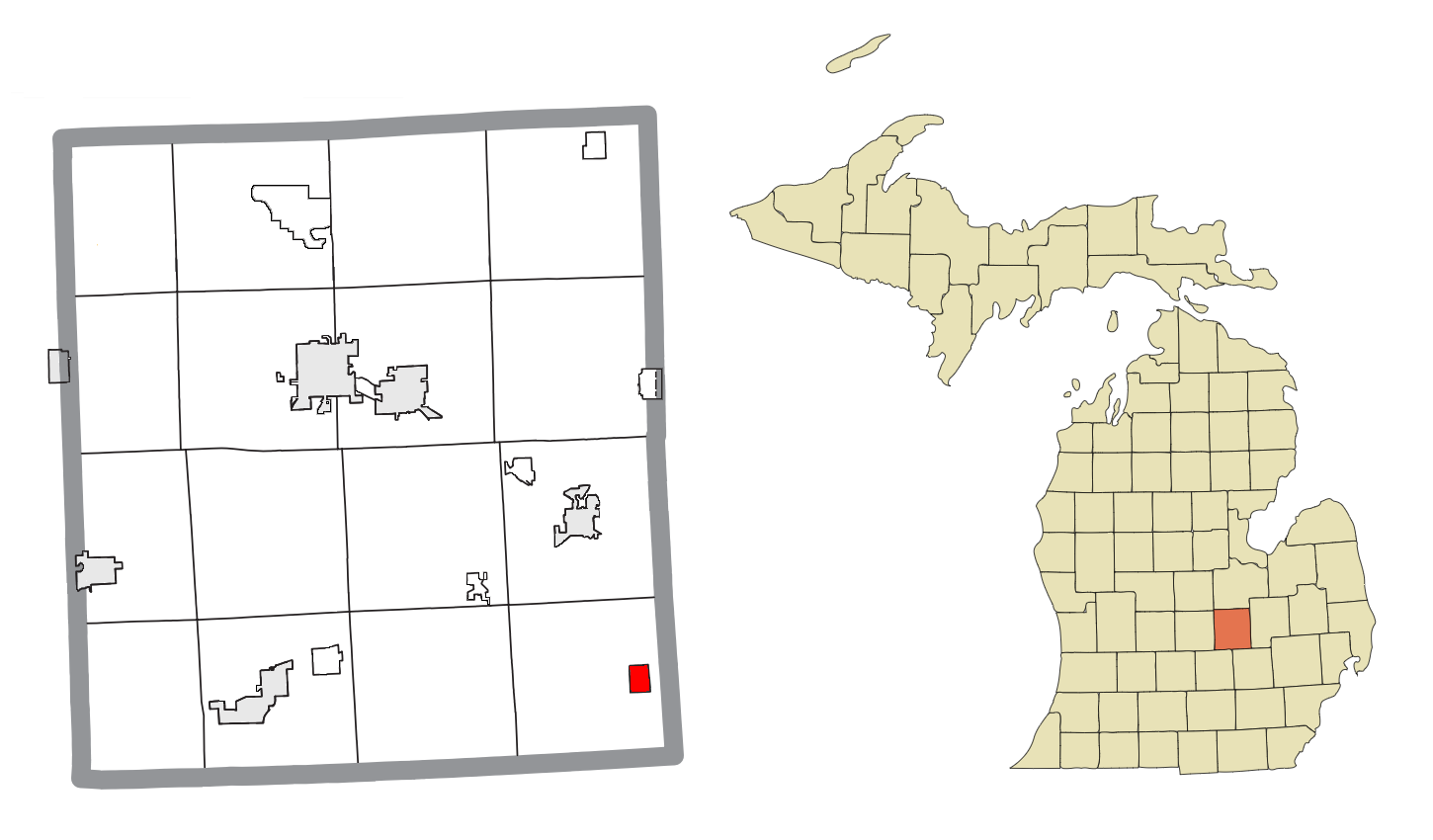
- Location within Shiawassee County

- Location within the state of Michigan
- Coordinates: 42°49′26″N 83°56′48″W
- Country: United States
- State: Michigan
- County: Shiawassee
- Township: Burns
- Founded: 1824
- Incorporated: 1873

Government
  - Type: Village council
  - President: Vicki Stevens
  - Clerk: Marsha Reed

Area
  - Total: 0.76 sq mi (1.97 km^{2})
  - Land: 0.71 sq mi (1.83 km^{2})
  - Water: 0.054 sq mi (0.14 km^{2})
- Elevation: 830 ft (250 m)

Population (2020)
  - Total: 545
  - Density: 771.7/sq mi (297.94/km^{2})
- Time zone: UTC-5 (Eastern (EST))
  - Summer (DST): UTC-4 (EDT)
- ZIP code(s): 48418
- Area code: 810
- FIPS code: 26-12260
- GNIS feature ID: 2397517
- Website: Official website

Byron (BY-rən) is a village in Shiawassee County in the U.S. state of Michigan. As of the 2020 census, Byron had a population of 545. The village is located within Burns Township.

== History ==
Founded in 1824, Byron received its first postmaster in 1837. One of the only towns in the county, Byron was the last stop on a stagecoach run from Detroit that ran west along what is now Rose Center road and Silver Lake road. The Village of Byron was incorporated in 1873. The Toledo, Ann Arbor & Northern Michigan Railway was built through Byron following the pledge of a $15,001 bonus and the right of way, in 1885.

== Geography ==
According to the United States Census Bureau, the village has a total area of 0.75 square miles (1.94 km^{2}), of which 0.70 square miles (1.81 km^{2}) is land and 0.05 square miles (0.13 km^{2}) (7.14%) is water.

== Demographics ==
Historical population
Census	Pop.	Note	%±
1880	355		—
1890	413		16.3%
1900	432		4.6%
1910	427		−1.2%
1920	376		−11.9%
1930	387		2.9%
1940	469		21.2%
1950	439		−6.4%
1960	542		23.5%
1970	655		20.8%
1980	689		5.2%
1990	573		−16.8%
2000	595		3.8%
2010	581		−2.4%
2020	545		−6.2%
U.S. Decennial Census

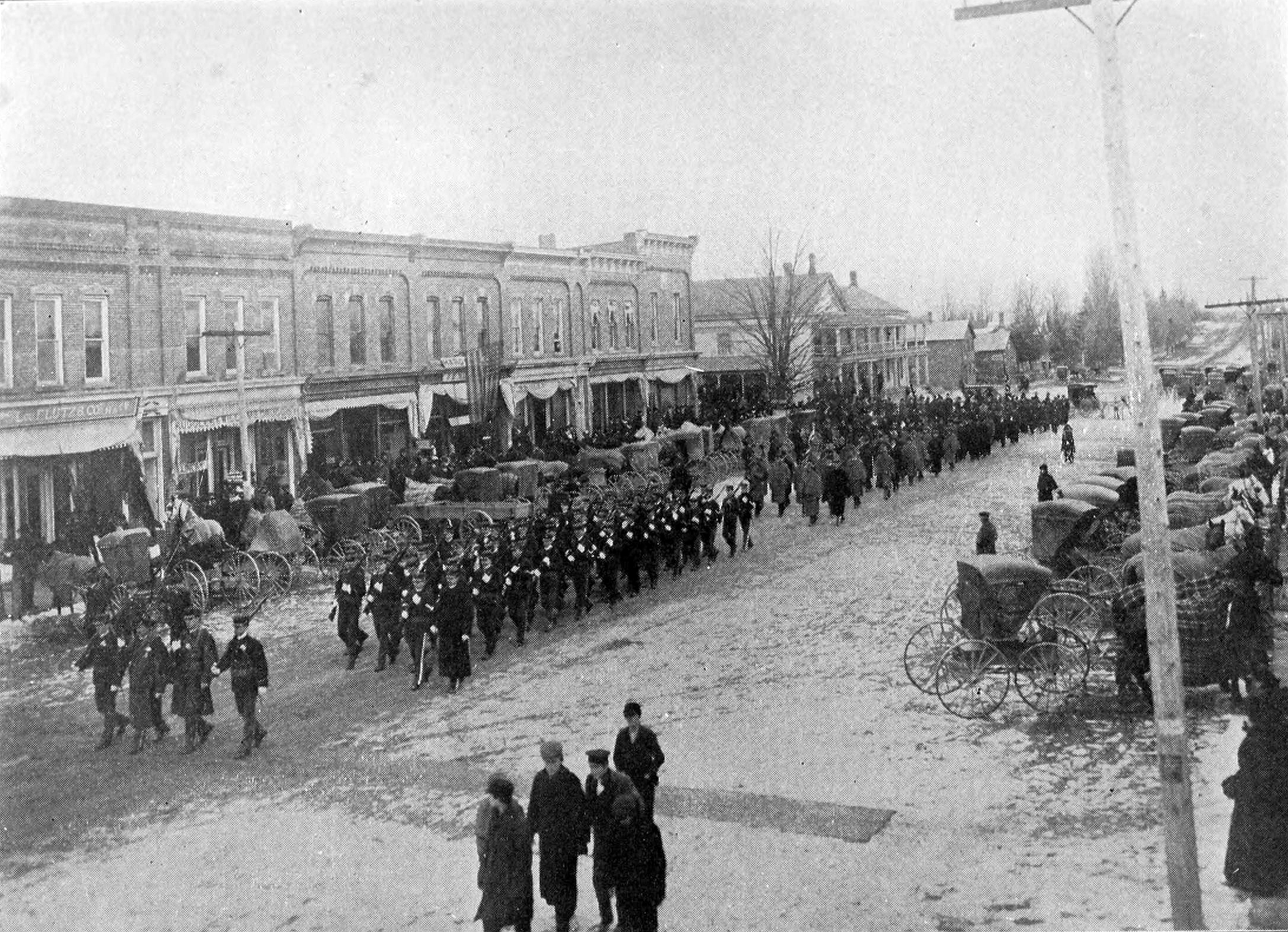
Soldiers and veterans of the Detroit Light Guard march in a funeral in Byron, 1900

=== 2010 census ===
As of the census of 2010, there were 581 people, 208 households, and 161 families living in the village. The population density was 830.0 inhabitants per square mile (320.5/km^{2}). There were 238 housing units at an average density of 340.0 per square mile (131.3/km^{2}). The racial makeup of the village was 95.7% White, 1.0% African American, 1.5% Native American, 0.2% Asian, 0.2% from other races, and 1.4% from two or more races. Hispanic or Latino of any race were 2.1% of the population.

There were 208 households, of which 48.1% had children under the age of 18 living with them, 51.4% were married couples living together, 17.8% had a female householder with no husband present, 8.2% had a male householder with no wife present, and 22.6% were non-families. 20.7% of all households were made up of individuals, and 5.8% had someone living alone who was 65 years of age or older. The average household size was 2.79 and the average family size was 3.19.

The median age in the village was 33 years. 33.9% of residents were under the age of 18; 7.3% were between the ages of 18 and 24; 26.1% were from 25 to 44; 24.6% were from 45 to 64; and 8.3% were 65 years of age or older. The gender makeup of the village was 48.5% male and 51.5% female.

=== 2000 census ===
As of the census of 2000, there were 595 people, 218 households, and 170 families living in the village. The population density was 806.2 inhabitants per square mile (311.3/km^{2}). There were 231 housing units at an average density of 313.0 per square mile (120.8/km^{2}). The racial makeup of the village was 96.64% White, 1.34% Native American, and 2.02% from two or more races. Hispanic or Latino of any race were 2.18% of the population.

There were 218 households, out of which 39.4% had children under the age of 18 living with them, 58.3% were married couples living together, 11.9% had a female householder with no husband present, and 22.0% were non-families. 18.8% of all households were made up of individuals, and 6.4% had someone living alone who was 65 years of age or older. The average household size was 2.73 and the average family size was 3.07.

In the village, the population was spread out, with 29.2% under the age of 18, 8.7% from 18 to 24, 31.1% from 25 to 44, 21.2% from 45 to 64, and 9.7% who were 65 years of age or older. The median age was 34 years. For every 100 females, there were 98.3 males. For every 100 females age 18 and over, there were 87.1 males.

The median income for a household in the village was $39,167, and the median income for a family was $41,563. Males had a median income of $34,286 versus $25,962 for females. The per capita income for the village was $17,137. About 5.8% of families and 6.7% of the population were below the poverty line, including 9.8% of those under age 18 and none of those age 65 or over.

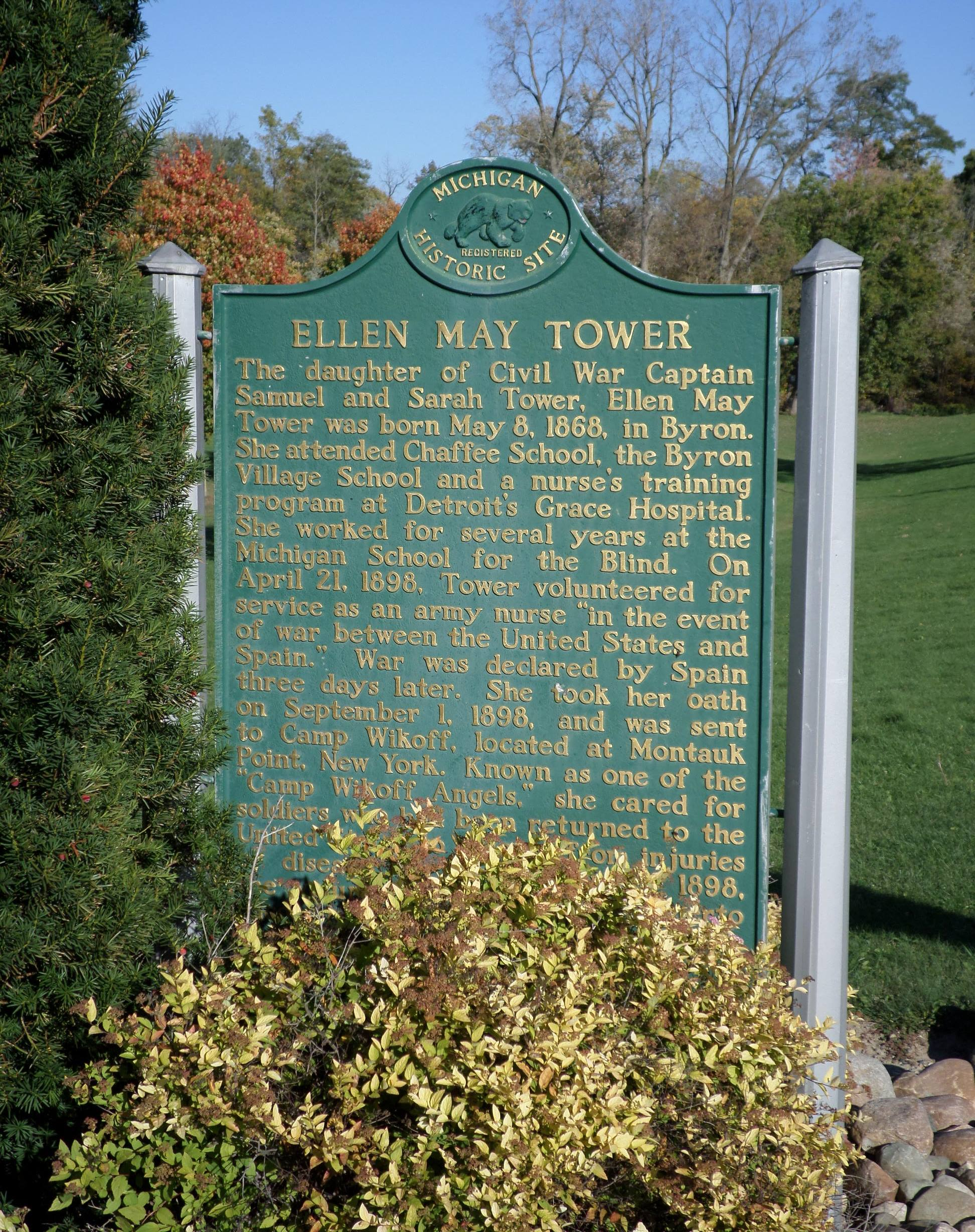
Plaque commemorating Ellen May Tower

== Notable people ==
- Erik Jones, race car driver, NASCAR Cup Series, 2015 NASCAR Camping World Truck Series; born in Byron
- Ellen May Tower (1868–1898) U.S. Army nurse born in Byron and died in Puerto Rico during the Spanish-American war. A state historical marker in her honor is located at 312 West Maple Street.
