= North Eastern State Trail =

Coordinates: 45.361475°N 84.298603°W

The North Eastern State Trail is a 71-mile (114 km) bicycle and hiking trail in Michigan that creates a non-highway right-of-way between Alpena and Cheboygan within three northern counties of Michigan's Lower Peninsula. The trail uses a section of the former roadbed of the Detroit and Mackinac Railway.

Points of interest along the trail, from south to north, include:

- Alpena
- Posen
- Onaway
- Aloha State Park
- Mullett Lake
- Cheboygan
