= Onaway, Michigan =

- City
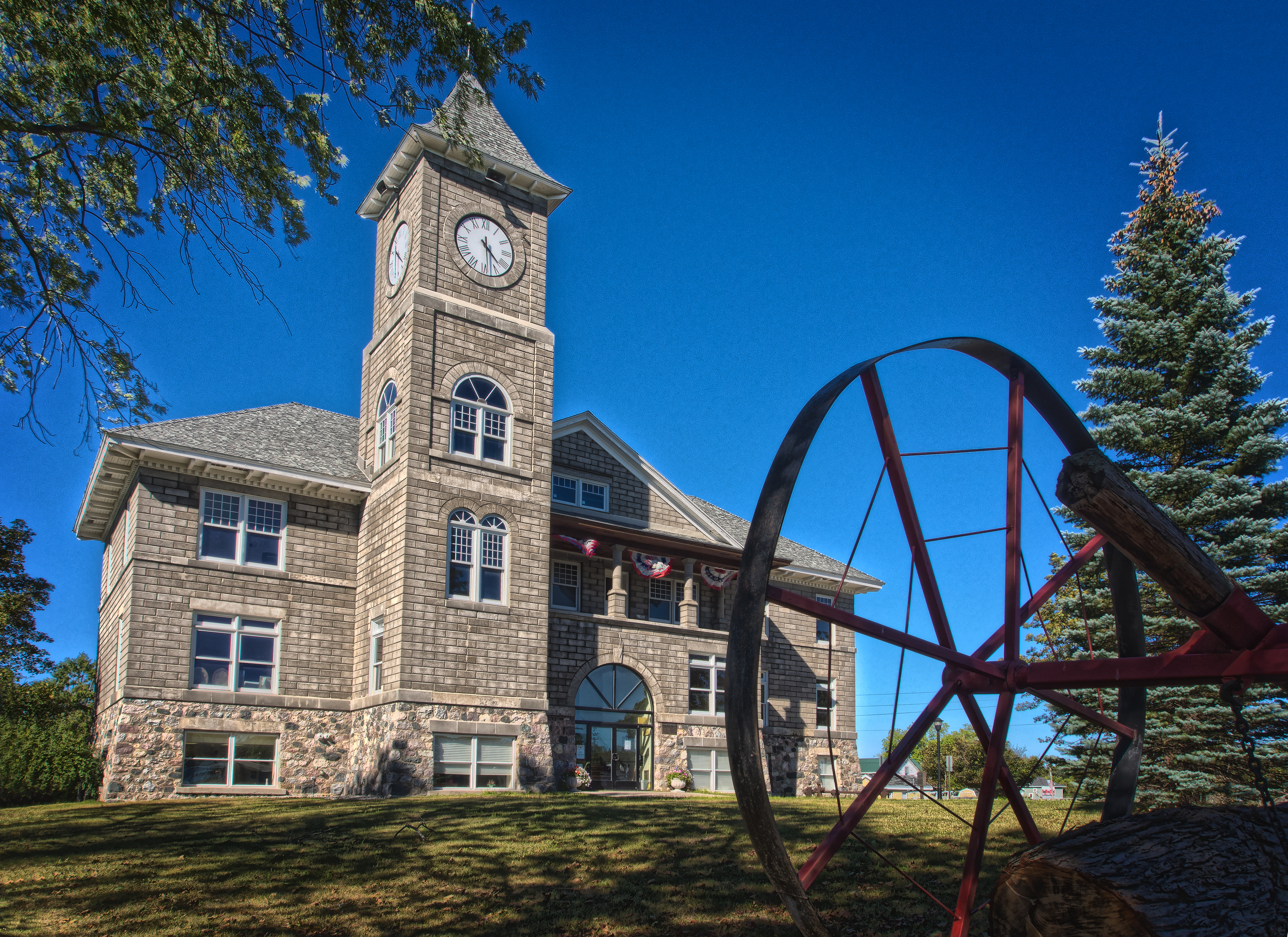
- Presque Isle County Courthouse

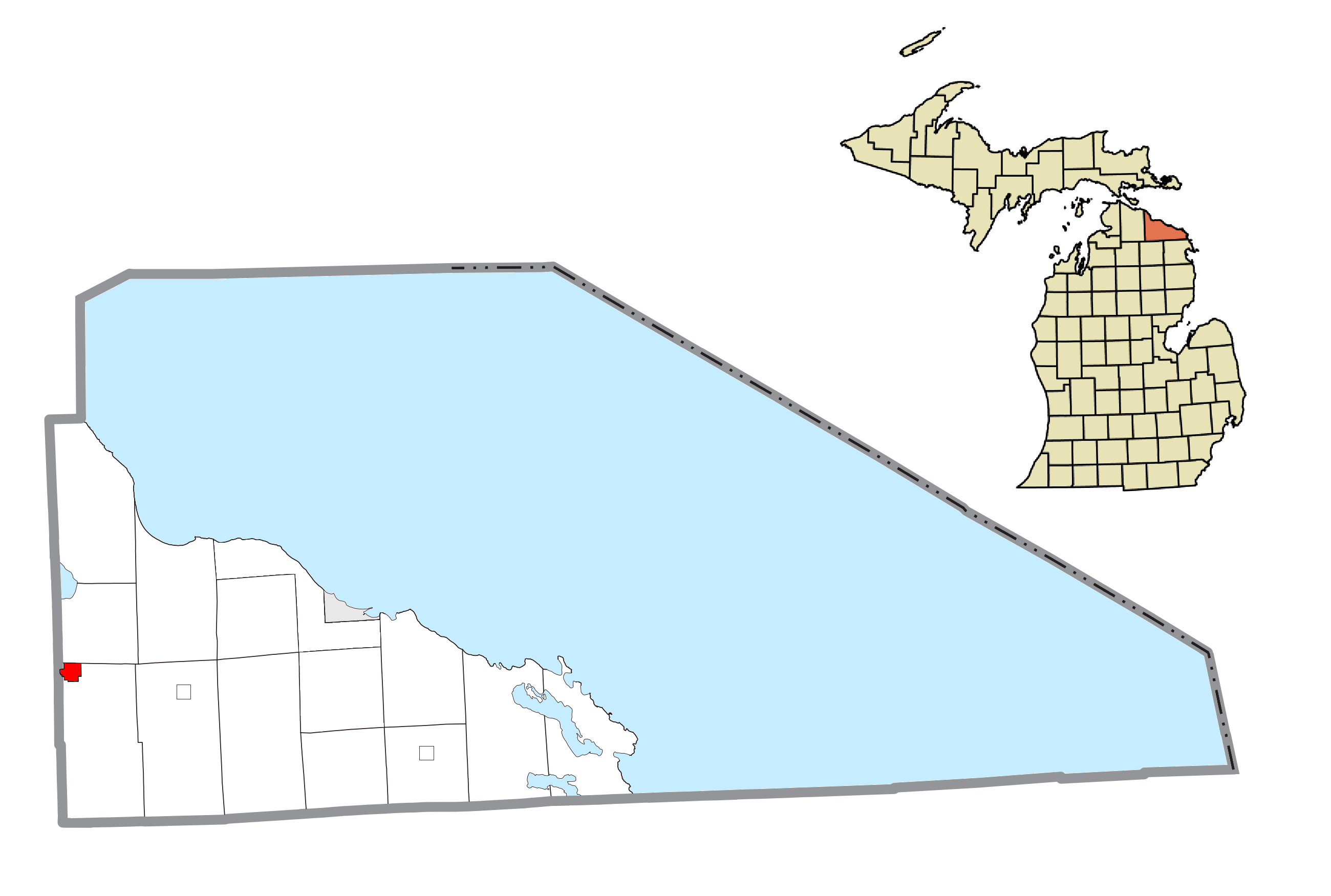
- Location within Presque Isle County

- Location within the state of Michigan
- Coordinates: 45°21′25″N 84°13′33″W
- Country: United States
- State: Michigan
- County: Presque Isle
- Incorporated: 1899 (village); 1903 (city)

Government
  - Type: City council

Area
  - Total: 1.63 sq mi (4.22 km^{2})
  - Land: 1.63 sq mi (4.22 km^{2})
  - Water: 0 sq mi (0.00 km^{2})
- Elevation: 850 ft (259 m)

Population (2020)
  - Total: 890
  - Density: 546.4/sq mi (210.95/km^{2})
- Time zone: UTC-5 (Eastern (EST))
  - Summer (DST): UTC-4 (EDT)
- ZIP code(s): 49765
- Area code: 989
- FIPS code: 26-60680
- GNIS feature ID: 0634060
- Website: Official website

Onaway (/ˈɒnəweɪ/) is a city in Presque Isle County, just east of the Cheboygan–Presque Isle county line in the U.S. state of Michigan. The population was 890 at the 2020 census. Onaway bills itself as the "Sturgeon Capital of Michigan", and there is a lake sturgeon streamside rearing facility on the nearby Black River, where the fish migrate down to the Cheboygan River and then to Lake Huron.

== History ==
This farming community received a post office open on October 23, 1882 with civil engineer Thomas E. Shaw as postmaster. This office was named Shaw for him. Arriving in 1886, Merritt Chandler had platted the community under the name of Onaway. Chandler took over as postmaster with it changing its name to Onaway on March 29, 1890. On August 18, 1893, Shaw took back the postmaster position and changed the office's name to Adalaska. Once again, the post office was renamed back to Onaway on November 15, 1897. Onaway was incorporated as a village in 1899. Onaway soon became a city in 1903. At the beginning of the twentieth century Onaway was home to one of the world's largest wooden automobile steering wheel manufacturers, producing approximately 65% of the world's wooden steering wheels.

== Geography ==
According to the United States Census Bureau, the city has a total area of 1.57 square miles (4.07 km^{2}), all land. The boundary of Cheboygan and Presque Isle counties is just west of the city.

=== Major highways ===
- M-33
- M-68
- M-211

=== Climate ===
Climate data for Onaway 4 N, Michigan (1991–2020 normals, extremes 1900–present)
Month	Jan	Feb	Mar	Apr	May	Jun	Jul	Aug	Sep	Oct	Nov	Dec	Year
Record high °F (°C)	78 (26)	64 (18)	87 (31)	91 (33)	95 (35)	102 (39)	106 (41)	101 (38)	97 (36)	89 (32)	77 (25)	84 (29)	106 (41)
Mean daily maximum °F (°C)	26.9 (−2.8)	29.9 (−1.2)	40.5 (4.7)	53.3 (11.8)	67.2 (19.6)	76.5 (24.7)	80.4 (26.9)	78.7 (25.9)	71.2 (21.8)	57.2 (14.0)	43.6 (6.4)	32.3 (0.2)	54.8 (12.7)
Daily mean °F (°C)	19.3 (−7.1)	20.6 (−6.3)	29.7 (−1.3)	41.5 (5.3)	54.2 (12.3)	63.6 (17.6)	68.1 (20.1)	66.8 (19.3)	59.7 (15.4)	47.8 (8.8)	36.3 (2.4)	25.8 (−3.4)	44.4 (6.9)
Mean daily minimum °F (°C)	11.8 (−11.2)	11.2 (−11.6)	18.8 (−7.3)	29.7 (−1.3)	41.2 (5.1)	50.6 (10.3)	55.7 (13.2)	54.9 (12.7)	48.2 (9.0)	38.4 (3.6)	29.0 (−1.7)	19.4 (−7.0)	34.1 (1.2)
Record low °F (°C)	−36 (−38)	−35 (−37)	−23 (−31)	−12 (−24)	16 (−9)	25 (−4)	32 (0)	29 (−2)	21 (−6)	12 (−11)	−14 (−26)	−27 (−33)	−36 (−38)
Average precipitation inches (mm)	2.03 (52)	1.51 (38)	1.78 (45)	2.96 (75)	3.07 (78)	2.88 (73)	3.11 (79)	3.24 (82)	3.31 (84)	3.54 (90)	2.41 (61)	2.14 (54)	31.98 (812)
Average snowfall inches (cm)	21.3 (54)	17.7 (45)	11.3 (29)	6.9 (18)	0.1 (0.25)	0.0 (0.0)	0.0 (0.0)	0.0 (0.0)	0.0 (0.0)	0.7 (1.8)	7.3 (19)	21.6 (55)	86.9 (221)
Average precipitation days (≥ 0.01 in)	17.7	12.5	10.6	11.3	12.6	10.6	11.2	11.3	13.2	16.2	14.6	16.9	158.7
Average snowy days (≥ 0.1 in)	14.9	10.9	6.5	3.0	0.2	0.0	0.0	0.0	0.0	0.5	5.8	12.5	54.3
Source: NOAA

== Demographics ==
Historical population
Census	Pop.	Note	%±
1900	1,204		—
1910	2,702		124.4%
1920	2,789		3.2%
1930	1,492		−46.5%
1940	1,449		−2.9%
1950	1,421		−1.9%
1960	1,388		−2.3%
1970	1,262		−9.1%
1980	1,084		−14.1%
1990	1,039		−4.2%
2000	993		−4.4%
2010	880		−11.4%
2020	890		1.1%
U.S. Decennial Census

=== 2010 census ===
As of the census of 2010, there were 880 people, 394 households, and 214 families residing in the city. The population density was 560.5 inhabitants per square mile (216.4/km^{2}). There were 495 housing units at an average density of 315.3 per square mile (121.7/km^{2}). The racial makeup of the city was 95.8% White, 0.7% African American, 0.9% Native American, 0.1% Asian, 0.3% from other races, and 2.2% from two or more races. Hispanic or Latino of any race were 1.6% of the population.

There were 394 households, of which 24.4% had children under the age of 18 living with them, 34.0% were married couples living together, 14.0% had a female householder with no husband present, 6.3% had a male householder with no wife present, and 45.7% were non-families. 40.1% of all households were made up of individuals, and 22.8% had someone living alone who was 65 years of age or older. The average household size was 2.21 and the average family size was 2.91.

The median age in the city was 43.6 years. 23.2% of residents were under the age of 18; 9.8% were between the ages of 18 and 24; 17.9% were from 25 to 44; 29.4% were from 45 to 64; and 19.5% were 65 years of age or older. The gender makeup of the city was 46.6% male and 53.4% female.

=== 2000 census ===
As of the census of 2000, there were 993 people, 448 households, and 237 families residing in the city. The population density was 585.6 inhabitants per square mile (226.1/km^{2}). There were 525 housing units at an average density of 309.6 per square mile (119.5/km^{2}). The racial makeup of the city was 96.37% White, 1.31% Native American, and 2.32% from two or more races. Hispanic or Latino of any race were 1.41% of the population.

There were 448 households, out of which 26.3% had children under the age of 18 living with them, 35.3% were married couples living together, 13.6% had a female householder with no husband present, and 46.9% were non-families. 42.0% of all households were made up of individuals, and 25.0% had someone living alone who was 65 years of age or older. The average household size was 2.18 and the average family size was 2.97.

In the city, the population was spread out, with 26.1% under the age of 18, 10.4% from 18 to 24, 24.7% from 25 to 44, 21.9% from 45 to 64, and 17.0% who were 65 years of age or older. The median age was 38 years. For every 100 females, there were 85.3 males. For every 100 females age 18 and over, there were 76.9 males.

The median income for a household in the city was $20,787, and the median income for a family was $26,786. Males had a median income of $26,932 versus $18,958 for females. The per capita income for the city was $13,552. About 20.3% of families and 26.9% of the population were below the poverty line, including 37.8% of those under age 18 and 20.4% of those age 65 or over.

== Media ==
All of the following can be accessed in Onaway, Michigan.

=== Newspapers ===
- The Alpena News is the daily newspaper of record for much of northeastern Lower Peninsula of Michigan.
- The Onaway Outlook is the weekly newspaper for the city of Onaway, Michigan, published by Presque Isle Newspaper, Inc.
- The Presque Isle County Advance is the weekly newspaper of Presque Isle County, published by Presque Isle Newspaper, Inc.

=== Television ===
- Channel 4: WTOM-TV "TV 7&4" (NBC) (Cheboygan) (simulcasted in channel 7, Harrietta)
- Channel 6: WCML "CMU Public Television" (PBS) (Montmorency Township)
- Channel 8: WGTQ "ABC 29&8" (ABC) (Goetzville) (simulcasted in channel 29, Kalkaska)
- Channel 10: WWUP-TV "9&10 News" (CBS) (Goetzville) (simulcasted in channel 9, Tustin)
- Channel 11: WBKB-TV "Channel 11 News" (CBS) (Alpena)

=== Radio ===
==== FM ====
Call Sign	Frequency	City Broadcast From
WTLI	89.3	Bear Creek Township
WPHN	90.5	Gaylord
WCML	91.7	Alpena
WFDX	92.5	Atlanta
WBCM	93.5	Boyne City
WKJZ	94.9	Hillman
WLXT	96.3	Petoskey
WRGZ	96.7	Rogers City
WAWM	98.9	Petoskey
WHAK	99.9	Rogers City
WMJZ	101.5	Gaylord
WMKC	102.9	Indian River
WGFM	105.1	Cheboygan
WHSB	107.7	Alpena

==== AM ====
Call Sign	Frequency	City Broadcast From
WTCM	580	Traverse City
WOUF	750	Petoskey
WHAK	960	Rogers City
WWMN	1110	Petoskey

== Transportation ==
The nearest commercial airports to Onaway are Alpena County Regional Airport, Cherry Capital Airport (Traverse City) and Pellston Airport.

- Michigan State Trunklines7
  - M-33
  - M-68
  - M-211 (southern terminus)
- Michigan Department of Natural Resources trails
  - North Eastern State Trail
