= Kalkaska Public Schools =

School district in Michigan, United States

Address
- 315 South Coral Street Kalkaska, Kalkaska County, Michigan, 49646; United States
- Coordinates: 44°43′56″N 85°10′57″W

District information
- Motto: Inspiring excellence through perseverance, resilience, and individual success.
- Grades: Pre-Kindergarten-12
- Superintendent: Rick Heitmeyer
- Schools: 4
- Budget: $30,464,000 2022-2023 expenditures
- NCES District ID: 2620050

Students and staff
- Students: 1,341 (2024-2025)
- Teachers: 89.8 (on an FTE basis) (2024-2025)
- Staff: 193.36 FTE (2024-2025)
- Student–teacher ratio: 14.93 (2024-2025)

Other information
- Website: www.kpschools.com

Kalkaska Public Schools is a public school district in Kalkaska County in Northern Michigan. It serves Kalkaska and the townships of Blue Lake, Kalkaska, and Oliver. It also serves parts of the townships of Bear Lake, Clearwater, Cold Springs, Excelsior, Garfield, Orange, and Rapid River, and Springfield.

== History ==
Kalkaska's school burned down in March 1943 and was replaced with a new building the next year.

The current Kalkaska High School was built around 1960.

In 1993, the school district gained national attention when it ended the 1992–93 school year in March, 10 weeks ahead of schedule, due to bankruptcy. This was the first instance in recent memory of a Michigan public school district closing early rather than cutting programs.

The district's revenue crisis led to a public outcry for reform and contributed to the passage of Proposal A in 1994, which changed Michigan's public school funding mechanisms. The district ultimately recovered financially. It finished $19 million in additions and renovation projects around 2013.

== Excelsior Township School District No. 1 ==
Fully encompassed by the boundary of Kalkaska Public Schools is the independent school district Excelsior Township School District 1, whose only school is a frame one-room schoolhouse called Crawford School. It has two teachers and houses grades kindergarten through eight. While many rural school districts in Kalkaska County with one-room schoolhouses consolidated with Kalkaska Public Schools over the years, voters in Excelsior Township School District No. 1 chose to stay independent because they felt their students would receive more personalized attention and they took pride in the well-maintained historic school building. After graduating from the school, students attend Kalkaska High School or Forest Area High School.

== Schools ==
Most of the district's schools share a campus in Kalkaska, and the district also operates an elementary school in Rapid City.

Schools in Kalkaska Public Schools district
School	Address	Notes
Kalkaska High School	109 N. Birch Street, Kalkaska	Grades 9-12
Kalkaska Middle School	1700 Kalkaska Road, Kalkaska	Grades 6-8
Kalkaska Upper Elementary	309 N. Birch Street, Kalkaska	Grades 3-5
Birch Street Elementary	309 N. Birch Street, Kalkaska	Grades PreK-2
Rapid City Elementary	5258 River Street, Rapid City	Grades PreK-5
Early Childhood Learning Center		Preschool
