= Traverse City metropolitan area =

Metropolitan area in Michigan, United States

Traverse City MSA Northwestern Michigan, Grand Traverse Area
- Metropolitan area
- Traverse City metropolitan statistical area
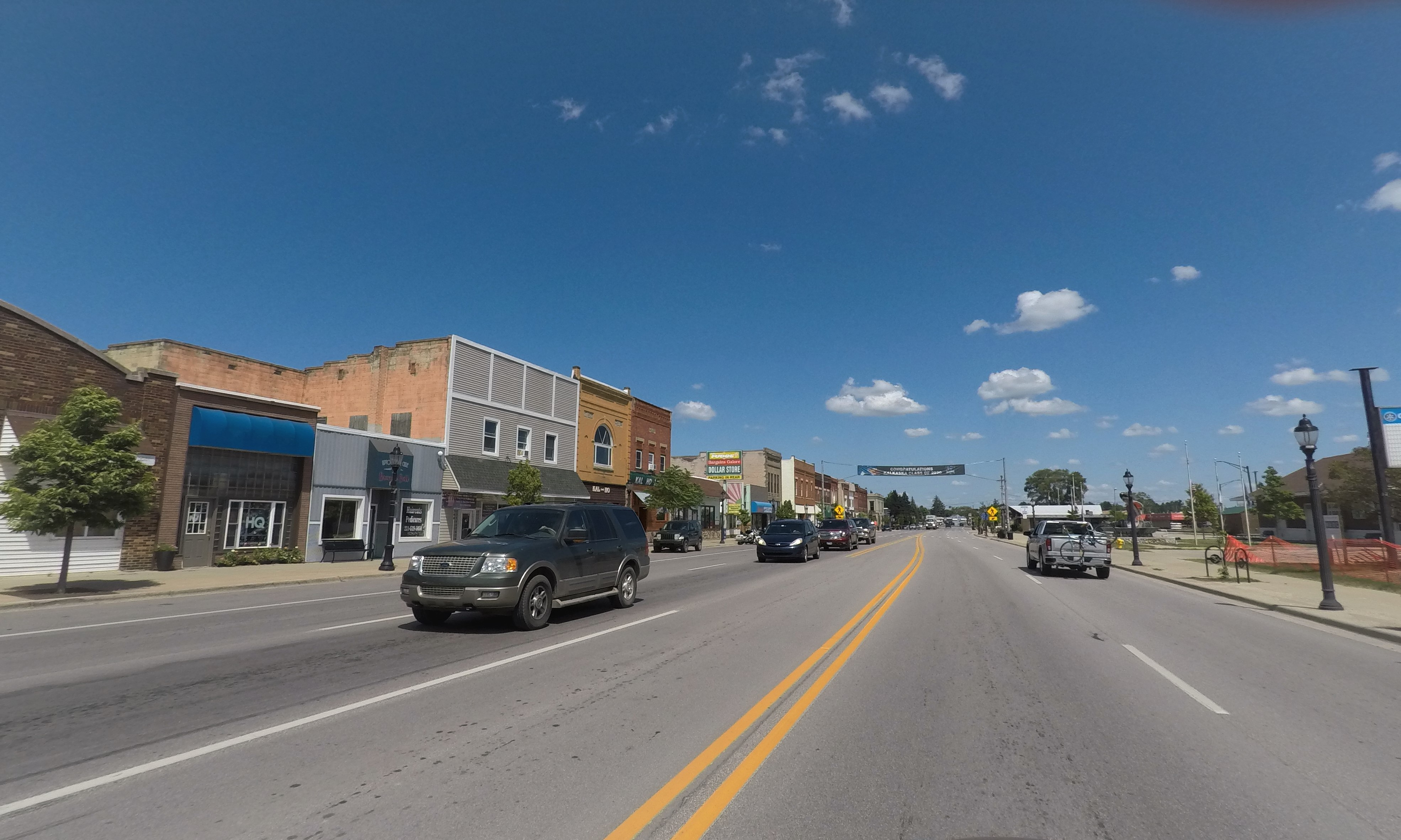
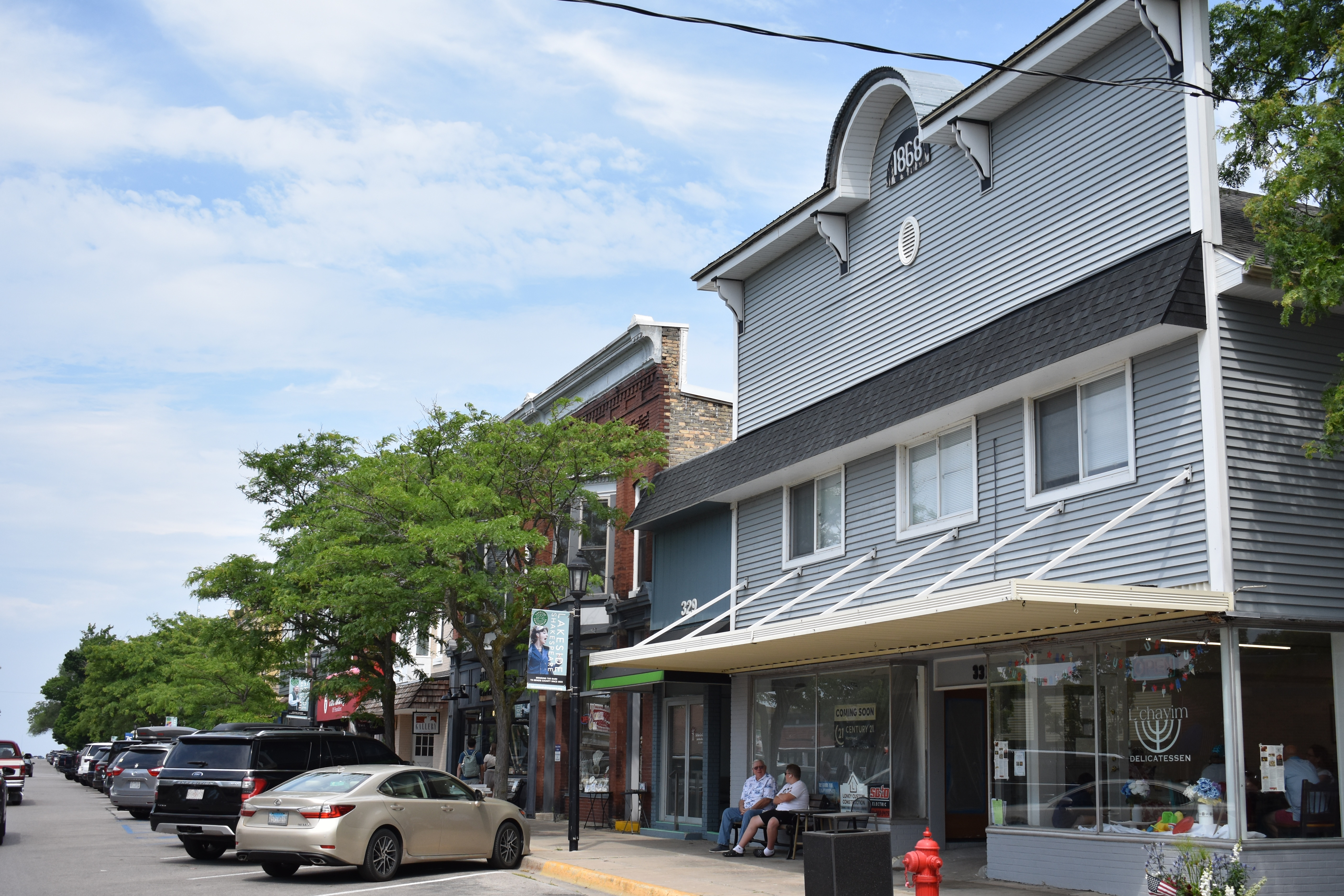
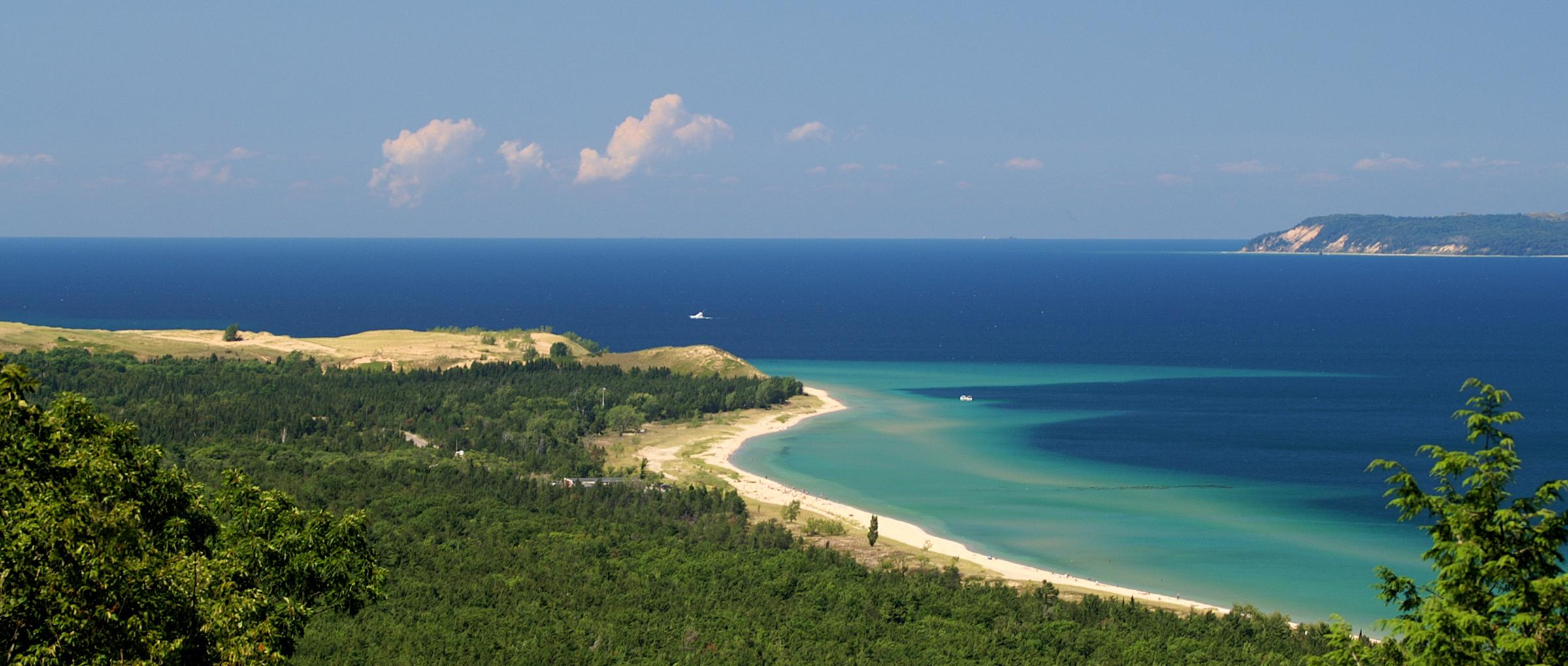
- Downtown Traverse City Downtown Kalkaska Downtown Frankfort Sleeping Bear Dunes and South Manitou Island
Traverse City MSA
Traverse City MSA counties
City of Traverse City
- Country: United States
- State: Michigan
- Counties: Benzie; Grand Traverse; Kalkaska; Leelanau

Area
  - Metropolitan area: 4,564 sq mi (11,820 km^{2})
  - Land: 1,691 sq mi (4,380 km^{2})
  - Water: 2,873 sq mi (7,440 km^{2})
  - Urban: 56.6 sq mi (146.6 km^{2})

Population (2020)
  - Metropolitan area: 153,448 (MI: 10th)
  - Estimate (2025): 156,972 ▲
  - Density: 33.6/sq mi (13.0/km^{2})
  - Urban: 59,493
  - Urban density: 1,051/sq mi (405.8/km^{2})
- Time zone: UTC-5 (EST)
  - Summer (DST): UTC-4 (EDT)
- Area code: 231

The Traverse City Metropolitan Statistical Area, as defined by the United States Census Bureau, is a metropolitan area in the northwestern Lower Peninsula of Michigan, encompassing the counties of Benzie, Grand Traverse, Kalkaska, and Leelanau, and anchored by the city of Traverse City. As of the 2020 U.S. census, the MSA had a population of 153,448, making it Michigan's tenth-largest metropolitan area. Between 2010 and 2020, the metropolitan area was also the fastest growing in Michigan. The region is colloquially referred to as "Northwestern Michigan", the "Grand Traverse Area", and less commonly, the "Traverse Bay Area".

== Description ==
The four counties that comprise the metropolitan area were first designated a micropolitan statistical area in 2003. This was then upgraded to metropolitan statistical area status in 2023.

Within the metropolitan area, the Census Bureau records an urban population of 59,493 as of the 2020 census. This is divided between the Traverse City—Garfield Urban Area, in Grand Traverse and Leelanau counties, with a population of 56,890, and the Frankfort Urban Area, in Benzie County, with a population of 2,603.

Nearly one in three residents of Northern Michigan (with a population of 506,658 in 2020) reside within the Traverse City metropolitan area. Grand Traverse County alone holds about 62% of the population of the metropolitan area, with a population of 95,238 in 2020.

== Communities ==
=== Cities ===
- Frankfort
- Traverse City (Principal city)

=== Villages ===
- Benzonia
- Beulah
- Elberta
- Empire
- Fife Lake
- Honor
- Kalkaska
- Kingsley
- Lake Ann
- Northport
- Suttons Bay
- Thompsonville

=== Townships ===
- Acme Township
- Almira Township
- Bear Lake Township
- Benzonia Township
- Bingham Township
- Blaine Township
- Blair Township
- Blue Lake Township
- Boardman Township
- Centerville Township
- Clearwater Township
- Cleveland Township
- Coldsprings Township
- Colfax Township
- Crystal Lake Township
- East Bay Township
- Elmwood Charter Township
- Empire Township
- Excelsior Township
- Fife Lake Township
- Garfield Township (Grand Traverse County)
- Garfield Township (Kalkaska County)
- Gilmore Township
- Glen Arbor Township
- Grant Township
- Green Lake Township
- Homestead Township
- Inland Township
- Joyfield Township
- Kalkaska Township
- Kasson Township
- Lake Township
- Leelanau Township
- Leland Township
- Long Lake Township
- Mayfield Township
- Oliver Township
- Orange Township
- Paradise Township
- Peninsula Township
- Platte Township
- Rapid River Township
- Solon Township
- Springfield Township
- Suttons Bay Township
- Union Township
- Weldon Township
- Whitewater Township

=== Unincorporated places ===
- Acme
- Bear Lake (Kalkaska County)
- Bendon
- Burdickville
- Cedar
- Chums Corner
- Grawn
- Greilickville
- Glen Arbor
- Glen Haven
- Interlochen
- Karlin
- Lake Leelanau
- Leland
- Manistee Lake
- Maple City
- Nessen City
- Old Mission
- Omena
- Peshawbestown
- Pilgrim
- Rapid City
- South Boardman
- Walton
- Williamsburg
- Yuba

== Demographics ==
MSA Population
Census	Pop.	Note	%±
1870	11,627		—
1880	21,045		81.0%
1890	31,696		50.6%
1900	47,853		51.0%
1910	53,127		11.0%
1920	41,103		−22.6%
1930	38,603		−6.1%
1940	44,785		16.0%
1950	50,148		12.0%
1960	55,027		9.7%
1970	63,912		16.1%
1980	91,063		42.5%
1990	106,497		16.9%
2000	131,342		23.3%
2010	143,372		9.2%
2020	153,448		7.0%
2025 (est.)	156,972	▲	2.3%
U.S. Decennial Census

As of the census of 2000, there were 131,342 people, 51,760 households, and 36,176 families residing within the metropolitan area. The racial makeup of the metropolitan area was 96.15% White, 0.33% African American, 1.43% Native American, 0.38% Asian, 0.03% Pacific Islander, 0.60% from other races, and 1.09% from two or more races. Hispanic or Latino of any race were 1.69% of the population.

The median income for a household in the metropolitan area was $40,913, and the median income for a family was $46,772. Males had a median income of $33,148 versus $23,026 for females. The per capita income for the metropolitan area was $20,408.

County	2020 census	2010 census	Change	Land area	Density
Grand Traverse County	95,238	86,986	+9.49%	464 sq mi (1,200 km^{2})	205/sq mi (79/km^{2})
Leelanau County	22,301	21,708	+2.73%	347 sq mi (900 km^{2})	64/sq mi (25/km^{2})
Benzie County	17,970	17,525	+2.54%	320 sq mi (830 km^{2})	56/sq mi (22/km^{2})
Kalkaska County	17,939	17,153	+4.58%	560 sq mi (1,500 km^{2})	32/sq mi (12/km^{2})

The largest municipality within the metropolitan area is Garfield Township in Grand Traverse County, with a population of 19,499 at the 2020 census. Garfield Township, as well as neighboring East Bay Township and the city of Traverse City itself, are the only municipalities within the metropolitan area with a population greater than 10,000. The largest village in the metropolitan area is Kalkaska.

== Transportation ==
=== Air service ===
The Traverse City metropolitan area is served by one regional airport, Cherry Capital Airport, located in Grand Traverse County. Other smaller, local airports within the area include:

- Empire Airport
- Frankfort Dow Memorial Field
- Green Lake Airport
- Kalkaska City Airport
- Woolsey Memorial Airport
- Yuba Airport

=== Major highways ===
- US 31
- US 131
- M-22
- M-37
- M-66
- M-72
- M-109
- M-113
- M-115
- M-186
- M-201
- M-204

=== Public transit ===
The Bay Area Transportation Authority (BATA) is a public transit agency serving Grand Traverse and Leelanau counties. The Kalkaska Public Transport Authority (KAT) operates public transit service in Kalkaska County, and the Benzie Bus operates public transit service between Benzie County and Traverse City.

== See also ==
- List of municipalities in Michigan
- Michigan statistical areas
