= Kalkaska =

Kalkaska may refer to several places or things associated with the U.S. state of Michigan:

- Kalkaska, Michigan, a village in Kalkaska Township and county seat of Kalkaska County
- Kalkaska County, Michigan
- Kalkaska Township, Michigan
- Kalkaska sand, the state soil of Michigan, named after the county
