= Blue Lake Township, Michigan =

Blue Lake Township is the name of some places in the U.S. state of Michigan:

- Blue Lake Township, Kalkaska County, Michigan
- Blue Lake Township, Muskegon County, Michigan

Website = Official website
