= Orange Township, Michigan =

Orange Township may refer to two townships in the U.S. state of Michigan:

- Orange Township, Ionia County, Michigan
- Orange Township, Kalkaska County, Michigan
