= Westwood Cemetery =

Westwood Cemetery can refer to:

- Westwood Cemetery (Michigan) - Kalkaska County, Michigan
- Westwood Cemetery (Westwood, California) - Westwood, Lassen, California
- Westwood Village Memorial Park Cemetery - Cemetery to the Stars in the Westwood Village area of Los Angeles, California
