= Oliver Township, Michigan =

Oliver Township is the name of some places in the U.S. state of Michigan:

- Oliver Township, Huron County, Michigan
- Oliver Township, Kalkaska County, Michigan

== See also ==
- Olive Township, Michigan (disambiguation)
