= Kalkaska County, Michigan =

County in Michigan, United States

- County
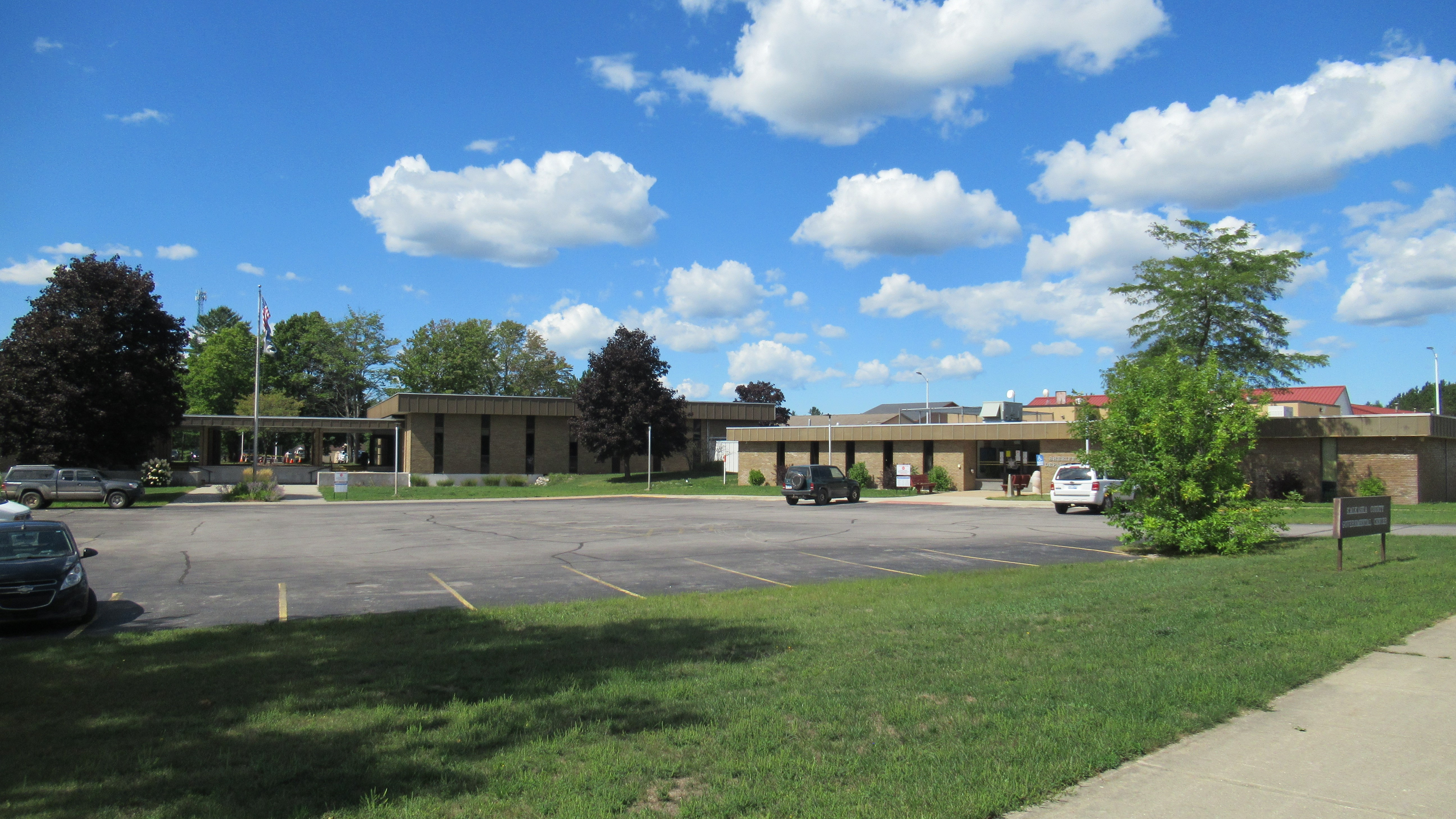
- Kalkaska County Government Offices in Kalkaska

- Location within the U.S. state of Michigan
- Coordinates: 44°41′N 85°05′W
- Country: United States
- State: Michigan
- Established: 1840
- Organized: 1871
- Seat: Kalkaska
- Largest village: Kalkaska

Area
  - Total: 571 sq mi (1,480 km^{2})
  - Land: 560 sq mi (1,500 km^{2})
  - Water: 11 sq mi (28 km^{2}) 1.9%

Population (2020)
  - Total: 17,939
  - Estimate (2025): 18,693 ▲
  - Density: 31/sq mi (12/km^{2})
- Time zone: UTC−5 (Eastern)
  - Summer (DST): UTC−4 (EDT)
- Congressional district: 1st
- Website: kalkaskacounty.net

Kalkaska County (/kælˈkæskə/ kal-KASS-kə) is located in the U.S. state of Michigan. As of the 2020 census, its population was 17,939. The county seat is Kalkaska.

Kalkaska County is part of the Traverse City metropolitan area. Although it is located in Michigan's Lower Peninsula, Kalkaska County is considered part of Northern Michigan.

== History ==
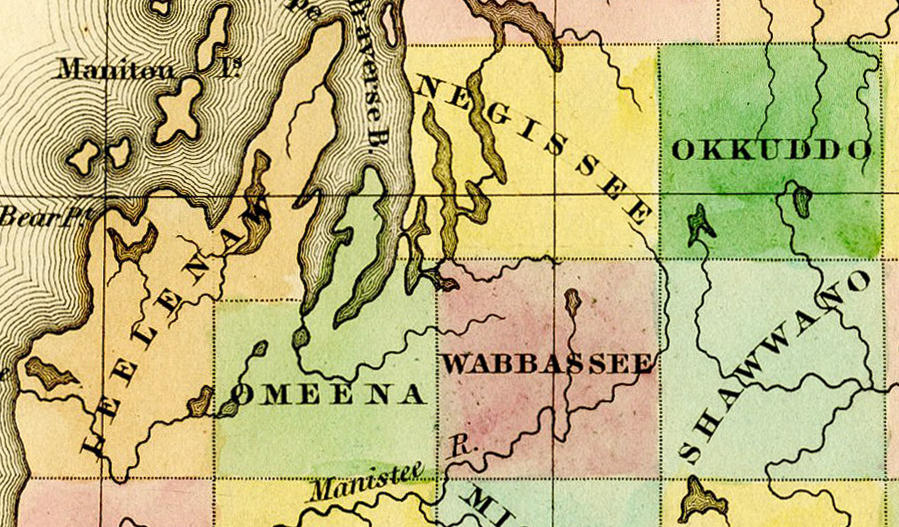
A detail from A New Map of Michigan with its Canals, Roads & Distances (1842) by Henry Schenck Tanner, showing Kalkaska County as "Wabbassee" (a misspelling of Wabassee, the county's name from 1840 to 1843.) Several nearby counties are also shown with names that would later be changed.

Kalkaska County, originally named Wabassee County (from waabizii meaning swan in Ojibwe) was separated from Michilimackinac County in 1840, renamed in 1843. In 1851, Kalkaska County was attached to Grand Traverse County for legal purposes. The first settler in Kalkaska County was William Copeland, from England, who purchased land in the northwest corner of the county in 1855. Kalkaska County was organized in its own right on January 27, 1871. Crawford County was then temporarily attached to Kalkaska County for legal purposes.

=== Etymology ===
The county's name is a pseudo-Native American neologism coined by Henry Schoolcraft, a Michigan geographer and ethnologist. Some theorists suggest this is word play. Schoolcraft's family name had been Calcraft, and the Ks may have been added to make the name appear more like a Native American word. Alternatively, the name may be derived from a Chippewa word meaning flat or burned-over country.

== Geography ==
According to the U.S. Census Bureau, the county has a total area of 571 square miles (1,480 km^{2}), of which 11 square miles (28 km^{2}) (1.9%) are covered by water.

Kalkaska sand, the state soil of Michigan, was named after the county because of the large amounts deposited in the area from glaciers in the Ice Age.

Kalkaska County has over 80 lakes and 275 miles (443 km) of streams and rivers. Much of the county is marshland. County elevation ranges from 595 feet (181 m) to about 1,246 feet (380 m). This makes it one of the more uneven counties in the Lower Peninsula.

The Pere Marquette State Forest covers much of the county. Glaciers shaped the area, creating a unique regional ecosystem. A large portion of the area is the Grayling outwash plain, a broad outwash plain including sandy ice-disintegration ridges, jack pine barrens, some white pine-red pine forest, and northern hardwood forest. Large lakes were created by glacial action.

=== Lakes ===
- Torch Lake
- Starvation Lake
- Lake Skegemog
- Bear Lake
- Manistee Lake
- Grass Lake
- Rainbow Lake
- Blue Lake
- Cub Lake
- Twin Lake
- Little Twin Lake
- Pickerel Lake
- Squaw Lake
- Indian Lake
- Perch Lake
- Crawford Lake
- Lost Lake
- Johnson Rd Lake
- Log Lake
- Selkirk Lake
- Kettle Lake
- Lake Placid
- Sand Lake
- Twenty Eight Lakes
- East Lake
- Long Lake
- Lake Five
- Wheeler Lake
- Fife Lake

=== Rivers ===
- Boardman River
- Little Rapid River
- Manistee River
- Rapid River
- Torch River

=== Major highways ===
- US 131 – runs NE through the western part of the county. Enters at 4 miles (6.4 km) north of SW corner; exits into Antrim County near midpoint of north county line.
- M-66 – runs north–south through west-central part of county. Passes Kalkaska.
- M-72 – runs east and ESE through middle portion of county. Passes Kalkaska.

=== Adjacent counties ===
- Antrim County – north
- Otsego County – northeast
- Crawford County – east
- Roscommon County – southeast
- Missaukee County – south
- Wexford County – southwest
- Grand Traverse County – west

== Communities ==
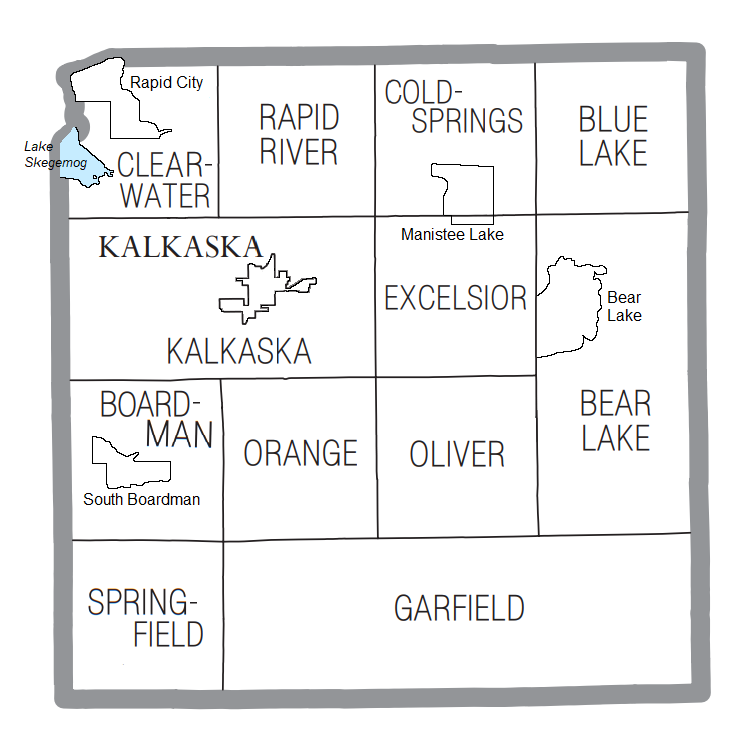
U.S. Census data map showing local municipal boundaries within Kalkaska County, as well as CDP boundaries

=== Village ===
- Kalkaska (county seat)

=== Civil townships ===
- Bear Lake Township
- Blue Lake Township
- Boardman Township
- Clearwater Township
- Coldsprings Township
- Excelsior Township
- Garfield Township
- Kalkaska Township
- Oliver Township
- Orange Township
- Rapid River Township
- Springfield Township

=== Former townships ===
- Glade Township
- Wilson Township

=== Census-designated places ===
- Bear Lake
- Manistee Lake
- Rapid City
- South Boardman

=== Unincorporated communities ===
- Barker Creek
- Crofton
- Darragh
- Houseman
- Leetsville
- Lodi
- Sigma
- Spencer
- Torch River

== Demographics ==
Historical population
Census	Pop.	Note	%±
1870	424		—
1880	2,937		592.7%
1890	5,160		75.7%
1900	7,133		38.2%
1910	8,097		13.5%
1920	5,577		−31.1%
1930	3,799		−31.9%
1940	5,159		35.8%
1950	4,597		−10.9%
1960	4,382		−4.7%
1970	5,272		20.3%
1980	10,952		107.7%
1990	13,497		23.2%
2000	16,571		22.8%
2010	17,153		3.5%
2020	17,939		4.6%
2025 (est.)	18,693	▲	4.2%
US Decennial Census; 1790-1960 1900-1990; 1990-2000 2010-2018

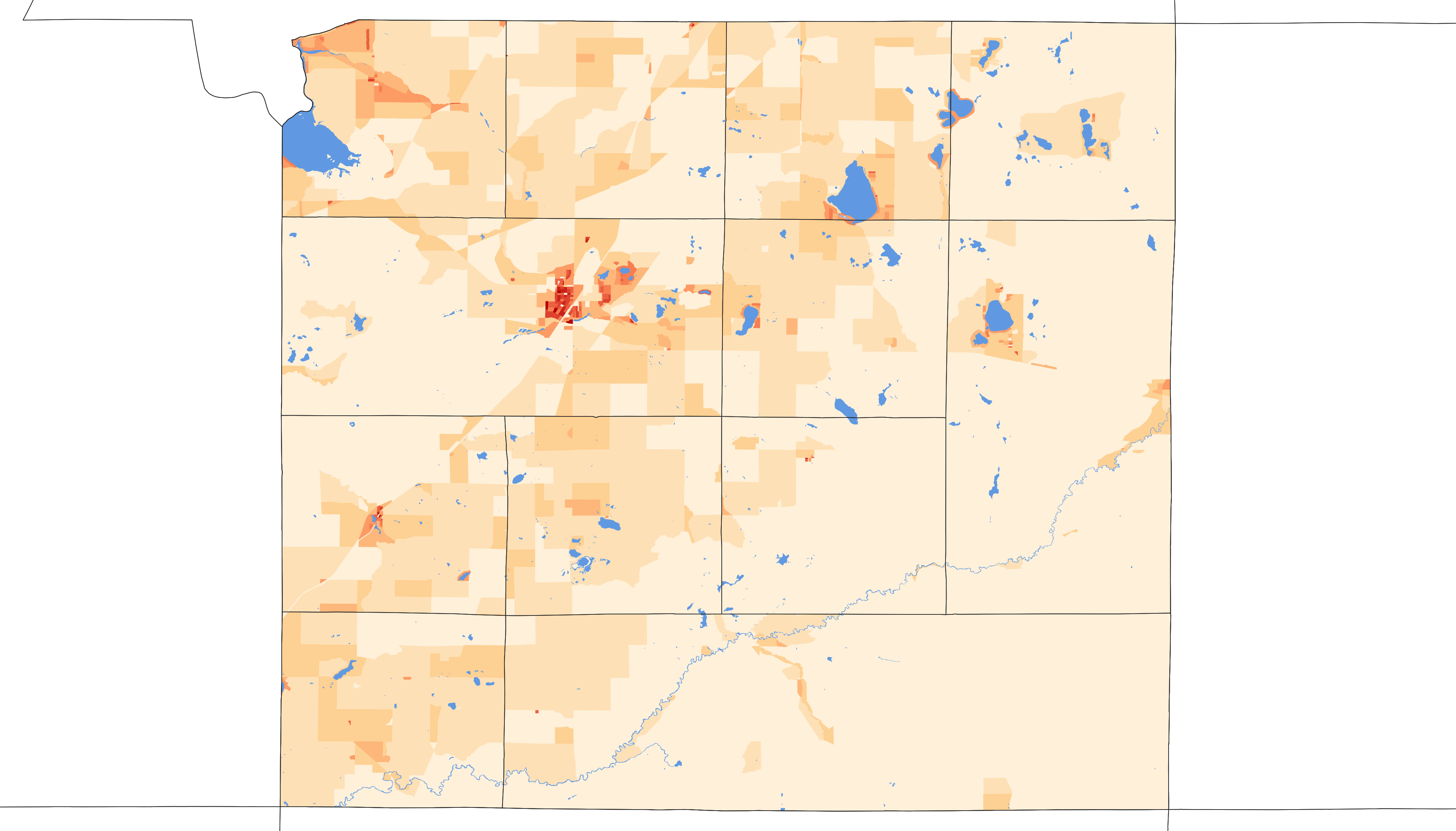
2020 population density of Kalkaska County MI by census block

=== Racial and ethnic composition ===
Kalkaska County, Michigan – Racial and ethnic composition Note: the US Census treats Hispanic/Latino as an ethnic category. This table excludes Latinos from the racial categories and assigns them to a separate category. Hispanics/Latinos may be of any race.
Race / Ethnicity (NH = Non-Hispanic)	Pop 1980	Pop 1990	Pop 2000	Pop 2010	Pop 2020	% 1980	% 1990	% 2000	% 2010	% 2020
White alone (NH)	10,831	13,263	16,063	16,456	16,523	98.90%	98.27%	96.93%	95.94%	92.11%
Black or African American alone (NH)	3	10	34	50	40	0.03%	0.07%	0.21%	0.29%	0.22%
Native American or Alaska Native alone (NH)	34	110	122	144	139	0.31%	0.81%	0.74%	0.84%	0.77%
Asian alone (NH)	25	23	37	41	60	0.23%	0.17%	0.22%	0.24%	0.33%
Native Hawaiian or Pacific Islander alone (NH)	x	x	8	1	0	x	x	0.05%	0.01%	0.00%
Other race alone (NH)	5	4	3	2	59	0.05%	0.03%	0.02%	0.01%	0.33%
Mixed race or Multiracial (NH)	x	x	162	245	763	x	x	0.98%	1.43%	4.25%
Hispanic or Latino (any race)	54	87	142	214	355	0.49%	0.64%	0.86%	1.25%	1.98%
Total	10,952	13,497	16,571	17,153	17,939	100.00%	100.00%	100.00%	100.00%	100.00%

=== 2020 census ===
As of the 2020 census, the county had a population of 17,939. The median age was 45.7 years. 20.1% of residents were under the age of 18 and 21.9% of residents were 65 years of age or older. For every 100 females there were 104.8 males, and for every 100 females age 18 and over there were 104.1 males age 18 and over.

The racial makeup of the county was 92.9% White, 0.2% Black or African American, 0.8% American Indian and Alaska Native, 0.3% Asian, <0.1% Native Hawaiian and Pacific Islander, 0.7% from some other race, and 5.0% from two or more races. Hispanic or Latino residents of any race comprised 2.0% of the population.

<0.1% of residents lived in urban areas, while 100.0% lived in rural areas.

There were 7,438 households in the county, of which 25.5% had children under the age of 18 living in them. Of all households, 49.7% were married-couple households, 20.7% were households with a male householder and no spouse or partner present, and 20.0% were households with a female householder and no spouse or partner present. About 27.3% of all households were made up of individuals and 13.0% had someone living alone who was 65 years of age or older.

There were 11,570 housing units, of which 35.7% were vacant. Among occupied housing units, 83.8% were owner-occupied and 16.2% were renter-occupied. The homeowner vacancy rate was 1.7% and the rental vacancy rate was 10.7%.

=== 2010 census ===
At the 2010 United States census there were 16,571 people, 6,428 households, and 4,634 families residing in the county. The population density was 30 inhabitants per square mile (12/km^{2}). There were 10,822 housing units at an average density of 19 per square mile (7.3/km^{2}).

In 2010, the racial makeup of the county was 98.44% White, 0.21% Black or African American, 0.78% Native American, 0.22% Asian, 0.05% Pacific Islander, 0.10% from other races, 0.86% of the population were Hispanic or Latino of any race. 24.6% were of German, 12.4% English, 10.4% Irish, 10.0% American, 6.3% Polish and 5.1% French ancestry. 98.8% spoke English as their first language.

== Government ==
Kalkaska County voters have been reliably Republican from the start. They have selected the Republican Party nominee in 86% of national elections (31 of 36).

United States presidential election results for Kalkaska County, Michigan
Year	Republican		Democratic		Third party(ies)	
Year	No.	%	No.	%	No.	%
1884	630	60.93%	369	35.69%	35	3.38%
1888	798	62.34%	400	31.25%	82	6.41%
1892	717	59.45%	389	32.26%	100	8.29%
1896	940	66.38%	422	29.80%	54	3.81%
1900	1,312	75.45%	361	20.76%	66	3.80%
1904	1,354	83.89%	184	11.40%	76	4.71%
1908	1,153	69.33%	356	21.41%	154	9.26%
1912	448	32.28%	293	21.11%	647	46.61%
1916	724	57.46%	430	34.13%	106	8.41%
1920	890	73.19%	224	18.42%	102	8.39%
1924	966	70.46%	205	14.95%	200	14.59%
1928	988	84.59%	160	13.70%	20	1.71%
1932	705	47.47%	649	43.70%	131	8.82%
1936	855	45.72%	952	50.91%	63	3.37%
1940	1,155	61.27%	718	38.09%	12	0.64%
1944	992	70.25%	409	28.97%	11	0.78%
1948	837	65.54%	400	31.32%	40	3.13%
1952	1,326	72.74%	483	26.49%	14	0.77%
1956	1,443	69.11%	636	30.46%	9	0.43%
1960	1,341	65.77%	693	33.99%	5	0.25%
1964	861	41.31%	1,220	58.54%	3	0.14%
1968	1,190	53.29%	753	33.72%	290	12.99%
1972	1,855	64.39%	924	32.07%	102	3.54%
1976	2,280	53.13%	1,957	45.61%	54	1.26%
1980	2,802	56.42%	1,807	36.39%	357	7.19%
1984	3,623	69.15%	1,595	30.44%	21	0.40%
1988	3,369	61.21%	2,092	38.01%	43	0.78%
1992	2,173	33.82%	2,297	35.75%	1,956	30.44%
1996	2,455	40.28%	2,666	43.74%	974	15.98%
2000	3,842	56.10%	2,774	40.50%	233	3.40%
2004	5,084	60.67%	3,189	38.05%	107	1.28%
2008	4,527	53.27%	3,780	44.48%	192	2.26%
2012	4,901	59.06%	3,272	39.43%	126	1.52%
2016	6,116	69.24%	2,280	25.81%	437	4.95%
2020	7,436	69.95%	3,002	28.24%	193	1.82%
2024	8,149	70.68%	3,206	27.81%	174	1.51%

United States Senate election results for Kalkaska County, Michigan1
Year	Republican		Democratic		Third party(ies)	
Year	No.	%	No.	%	No.	%
2024	7,757	68.56%	3,150	27.84%	408	3.61%

Michigan Gubernatorial election results for Kalkaska County
Year	Republican		Democratic		Third party(ies)	
Year	No.	%	No.	%	No.	%
2022	5,616	63.43%	3,009	33.98%	229	2.59%

The county government operates the jail, maintains rural roads, operates the major local courts, records deeds, mortgages, and vital records, administers public health regulations, and participates with the state in the provision of social services. The county board of commissioners controls the budget and has limited authority to make laws or ordinances. In Michigan, most local government functions—police and fire, building and zoning, tax assessment, street maintenance, etc.—are the responsibility of individual cities and townships.

== Events ==
The National Trout Festival is an annual festival since 1936, held in April. It notes the heritage and sportsmanship of Kalkaska.

== Education ==
The Northwest Educational Services, based in Traverse City, services the students in the county along with those of Antrim, Benzie, Grand Traverse, and Leelanau. The intermediate school district offers regional special education services, early education and English learner programs, and technical career pathways for students of its districts.

Kalkaska County is served by the following regular public school districts:

- Excelsior Township School District #1
- Forest Area Community Schools
- Kalkaska Public Schools

== See also ==
- List of Michigan State Historic Sites in Kalkaska County, Michigan
- Westwood Cemetery (Michigan)
