= Westwood Cemetery (Michigan) =

Cemetery in Kalkaska County, Michigan, US

Coordinates: 44°51′07.0″N 85°09′15.2″W

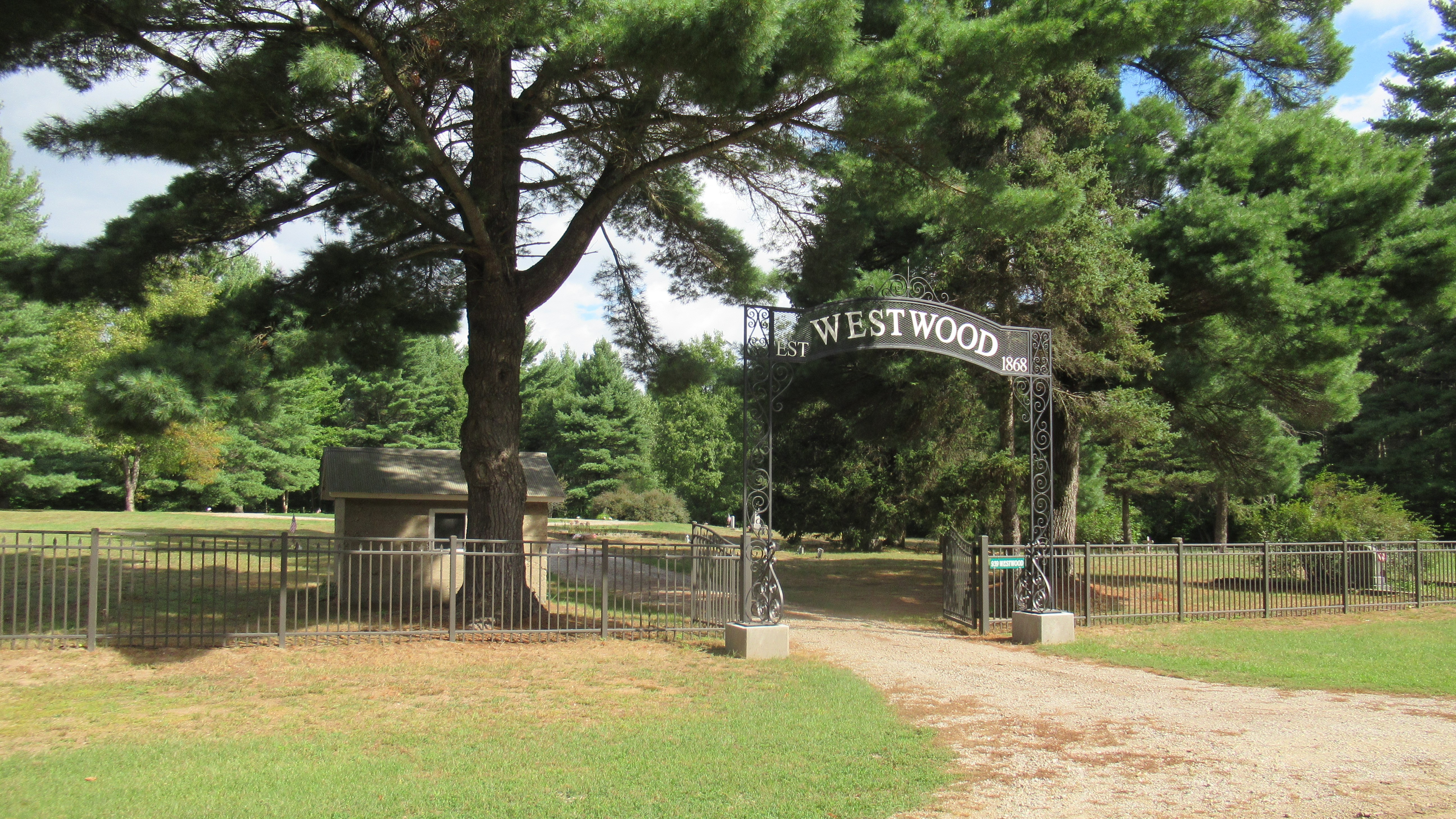
- Interactive map of Westwood Cemetery

Details
- Established: 1868
- Location: 939 NW Westwood Road; Rapid River Township, Michigan
- Country: United States
- Type: Public cemetery (active)
- Find a Grave: Westwood Cemetery

Westwood Cemetery is one of the oldest cemeteries in Kalkaska County, Michigan, dating back to the early 19th century. It was originally intended for the Westwood family, but is today a public cemetery.
