= Lake Five (Michigan) =

Lake in the state of Michigan, United States

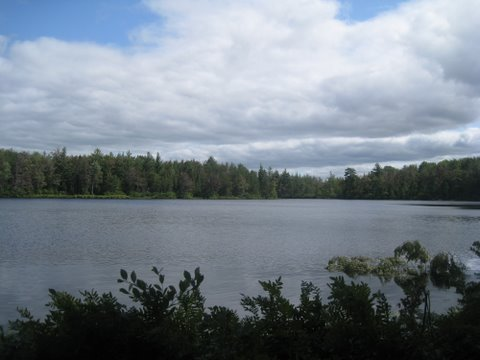

- Location within Michigan
- Location: Kalkaska County, Michigan, United States
- Coordinates: 44°45′53″N 85°03′37″W
- Basin countries: United States
- Max. length: 0.26 miles (0.4 km)
- Max. width: 0.17 miles (0.3 km)
- Surface area: 17 acres (0.1 km^{2})
- Surface elevation: 1,188 feet (362.1 m)
- Frozen: Seasonally
- Islands: None

Lake Five is a private fresh water lake in Kalkaska County, Michigan, United States.

Lake Five has abundant water fauna including largemouth bass, bluegill, perch, painted turtle and snapping turtle. Lake Five also has abundant land fauna including black bear, white-tailed deer, garter snake, midland brown snake (Storeria dekayi wrightorum), red fox, beaver and wild turkey.

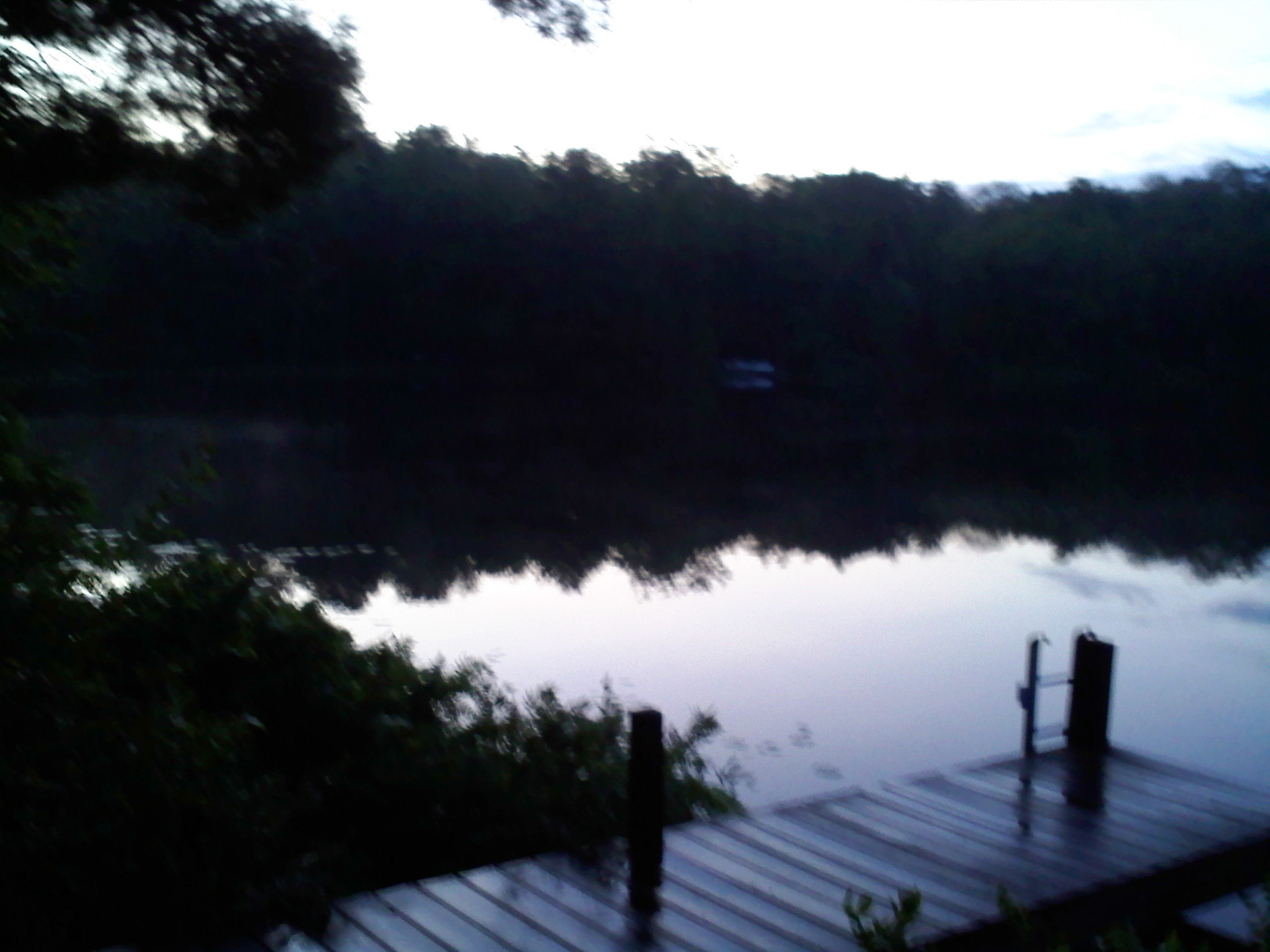
Lake Five

== See also ==
- List of lakes in Michigan
