= Olive Township, Michigan =

Olive Township is the name of some places in the U.S. state of Michigan:

- Olive Township, Clinton County, Michigan
- Olive Township, Ottawa County, Michigan

== See also ==
- Oliver Township, Michigan (disambiguation)
