= National Trout Festival =

Annual trout season festival in Michigan

- Frequency: Annual
- Locations: Kalkaska, Michigan, U.S.
- Coordinates: 44°44′4″N 85°10′48″W
- Inaugurated: 1935
- Most recent: 24–28 April 2024
- Website: nationaltroutfestival.com

The National Trout Festival is an annual festival held in Kalkaska, Michigan the last weekend in April to celebrate the opening of trout season in Michigan. The 87th National Trout Festival will be held 24–28 April 2024. The festival was canceled for two years during World War II.

Events of the National Trout Festival include a fishing contest for children aged 16 and younger, a carnival, parades, fireworks, motor sports, live music, and more. Many community organizations host activities and fundraisers during the festival.
