= Blue Lake Township, Kalkaska County, Michigan =

Blue Lake Township, Michigan
- Civil township
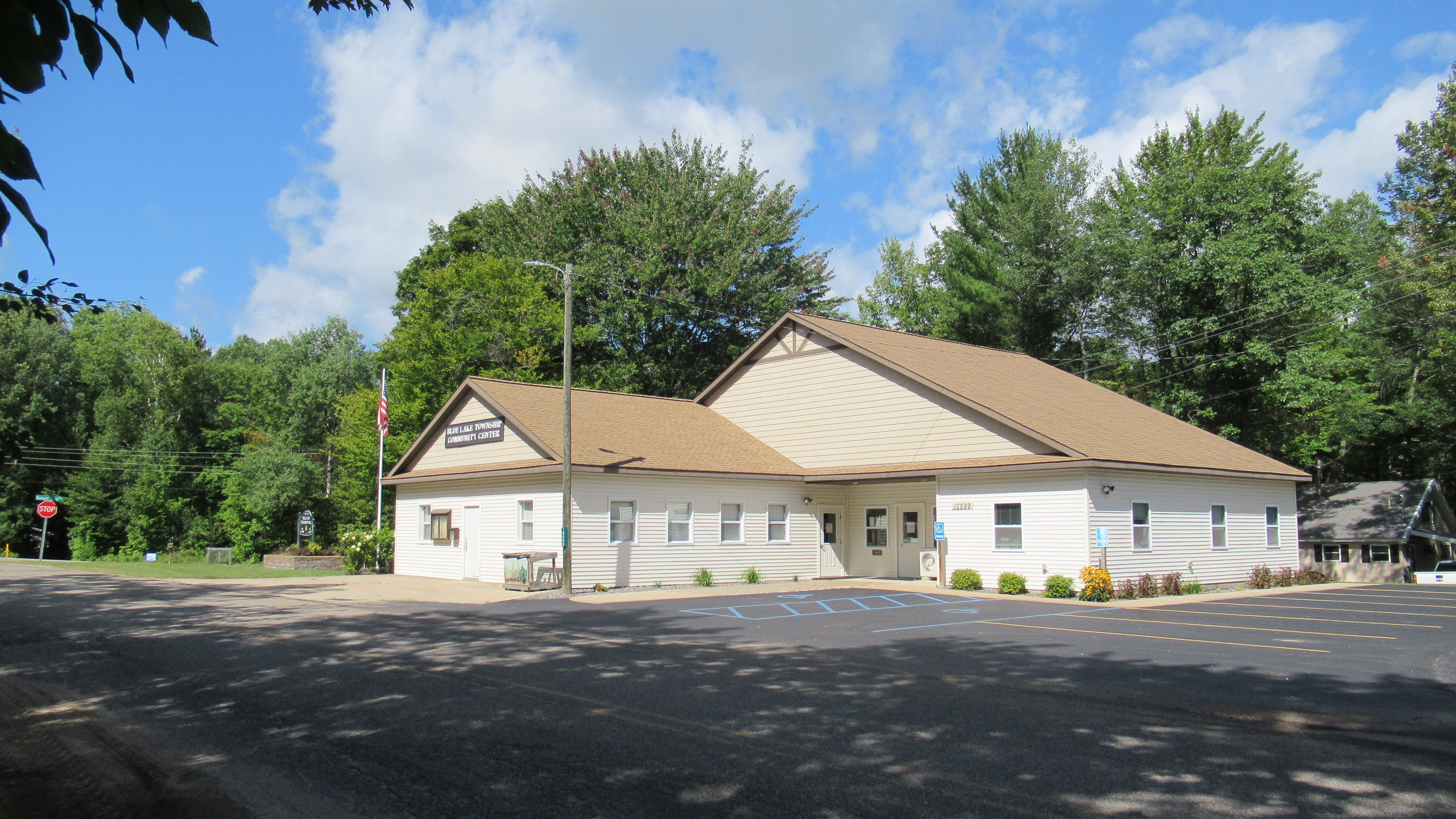
- Blue Lake Township Community Center

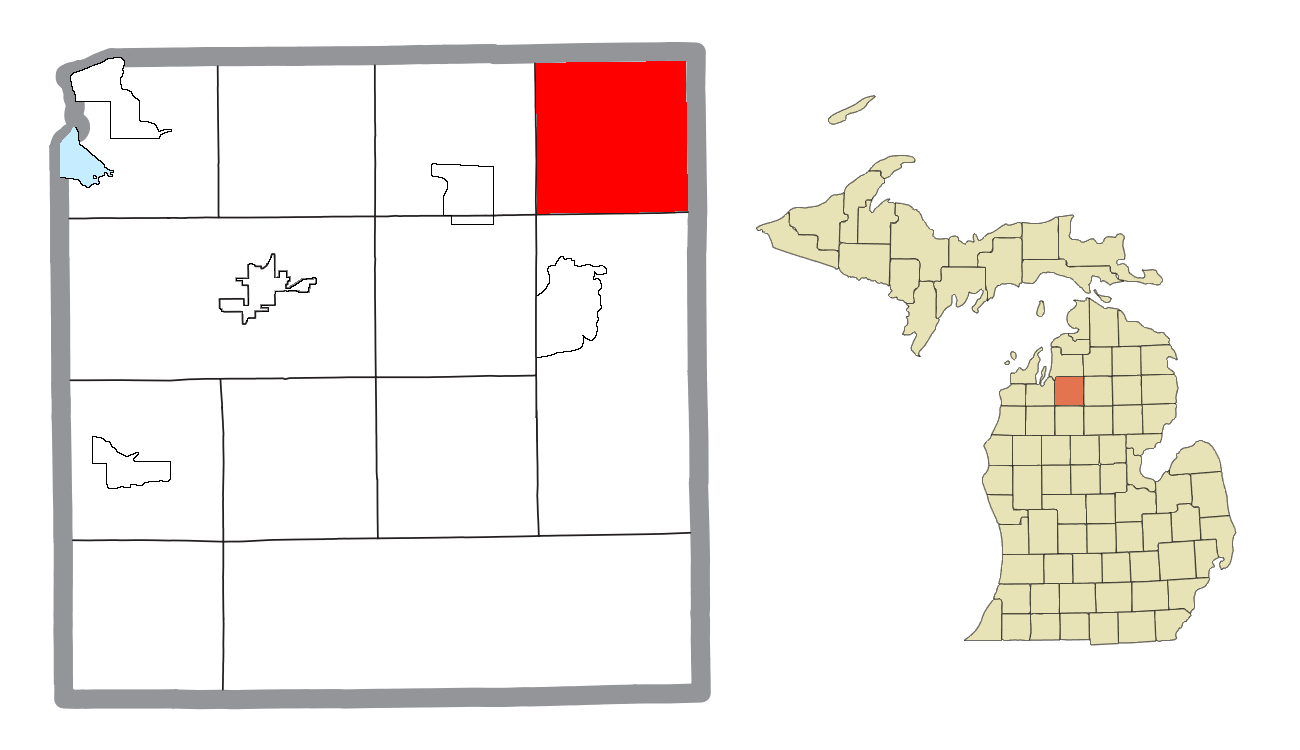
- Location within Kalkaska County

- Location within the state of Michigan Blue Lake Township (the United States)
- Coordinates: 44°49′09″N 84°54′01″W
- Country: United States
- State: Michigan
- County: Kalkaska

Government
  - Supervisor: Blair Shearer
  - Clerk: Tracy Nichol

Area
  - Total: 36.23 sq mi (93.8 km^{2})
  - Land: 34.96 sq mi (90.5 km^{2})
  - Water: 1.27 sq mi (3.3 km^{2})
- Elevation: 1,371 ft (418 m)

Population (2020)
  - Total: 393
  - Density: 11.1/sq mi (4.3/km^{2})
- Time zone: UTC-5 (Eastern (EST))
  - Summer (DST): UTC-4 (EDT)
- ZIP code(s): 49646 (Kalkaska); 49659 (Mancelona); 49733 (Frederic)
- Area code: 231
- FIPS code: 26-09320
- GNIS feature ID: 1625955
- Website: Official website

Blue Lake Township is a civil township of Kalkaska County in the U.S. state of Michigan. As of the 2020 census, the township population was 393.

== Geography ==
According to the United States Census Bureau, the township has a total area of 32.23 square miles (83.48 km^{2}), of which 34.96 square miles (90.55 km^{2}) is land and 1.27 square miles (3.29 km^{2}) (3.94%) is water.

Blue Lake Township contains numerous small lakes, including Bass Lake, Blue Lake, Deadmans Lake, Eagle Lake, Indian Lake, Little Blue Lake, Little Twin Lake, MacNeil Pond, North Crooked Lake, Papoose Lake, Poplar Lake, South Crooked Lake, Squaw Lake, Starvation Lake, Twin Lake, and Waddell Pond.

== Demographics ==
As of the census of 2000, there were 428 people, 202 households, and 150 families residing in the township. The population density was 12.4 inhabitants per square mile (4.8/km^{2}). There were 738 housing units at an average density of 21.3 per square mile (8.2/km^{2}). The racial makeup of the township was 98.83% White, 0.47% from other races, and 0.70% from two or more races. Hispanic or Latino of any race were 0.93% of the population.

There were 202 households, out of which 10.9% had children under the age of 18 living with them, 70.8% were married couples living together, 3.0% had a female householder with no husband present, and 25.7% were non-families. 22.3% of all households were made up of individuals, and 8.9% had someone living alone who was 65 years of age or older. The average household size was 2.11 and the average family size was 2.43.

In the township the population was spread out, with 10.7% under the age of 18, 3.5% from 18 to 24, 17.3% from 25 to 44, 35.0% from 45 to 64, and 33.4% who were 65 years of age or older. The median age was 58 years. For every 100 females, there were 111.9 males. For every 100 females age 18 and over, there were 111.0 males.

The median income for a household in the township was $37,045, and the median income for a family was $39,643. Males had a median income of $40,000 versus $15,000 for females. The per capita income for the township was $20,543. About 2.6% of families and 4.0% of the population were below the poverty line, including 5.0% of those under age 18 and 1.3% of those age 65 or over.
