= Oliver Township, Kalkaska County, Michigan =

Oliver Township, Michigan
- Civil township
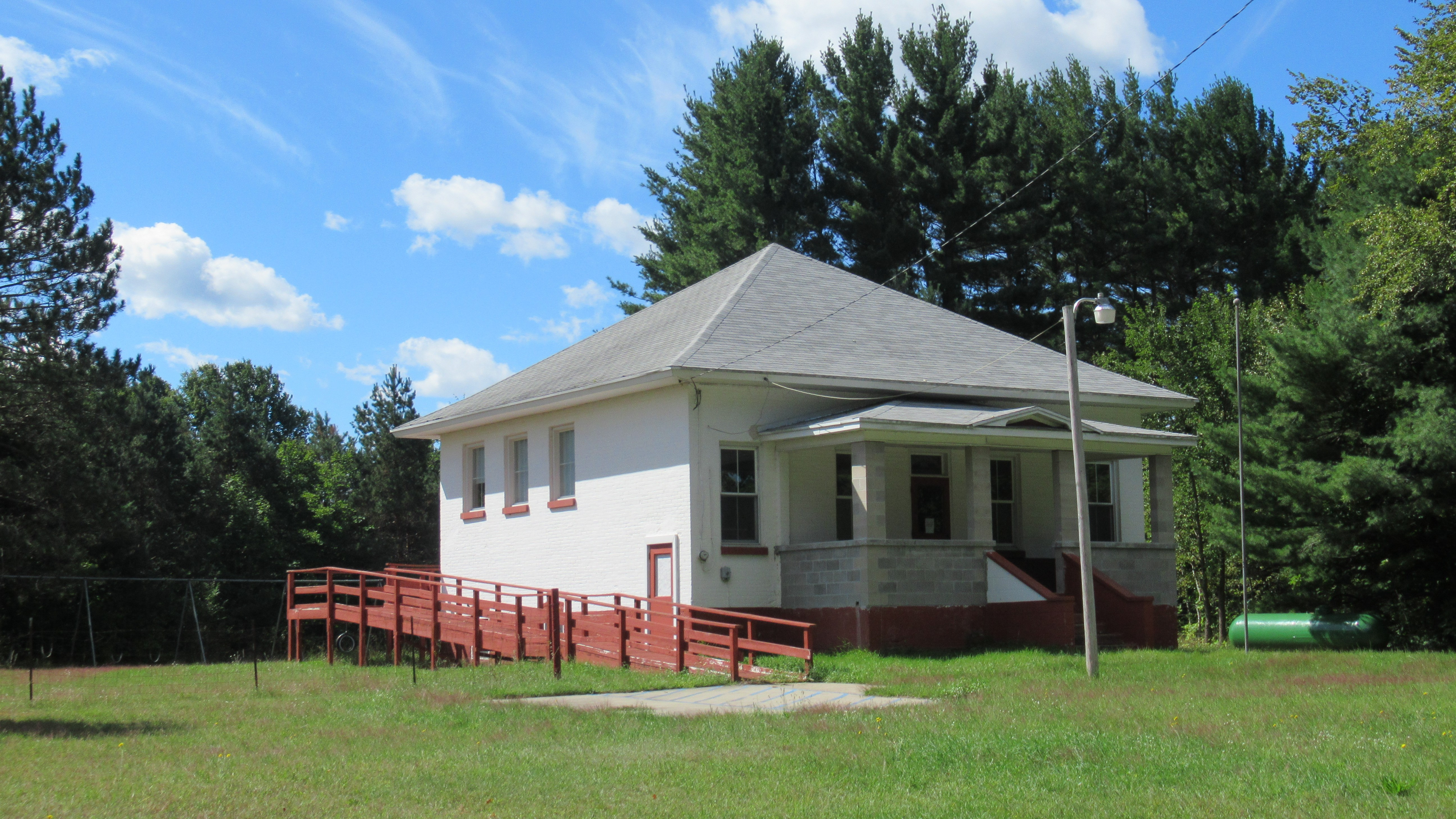
- Oliver Township Hall

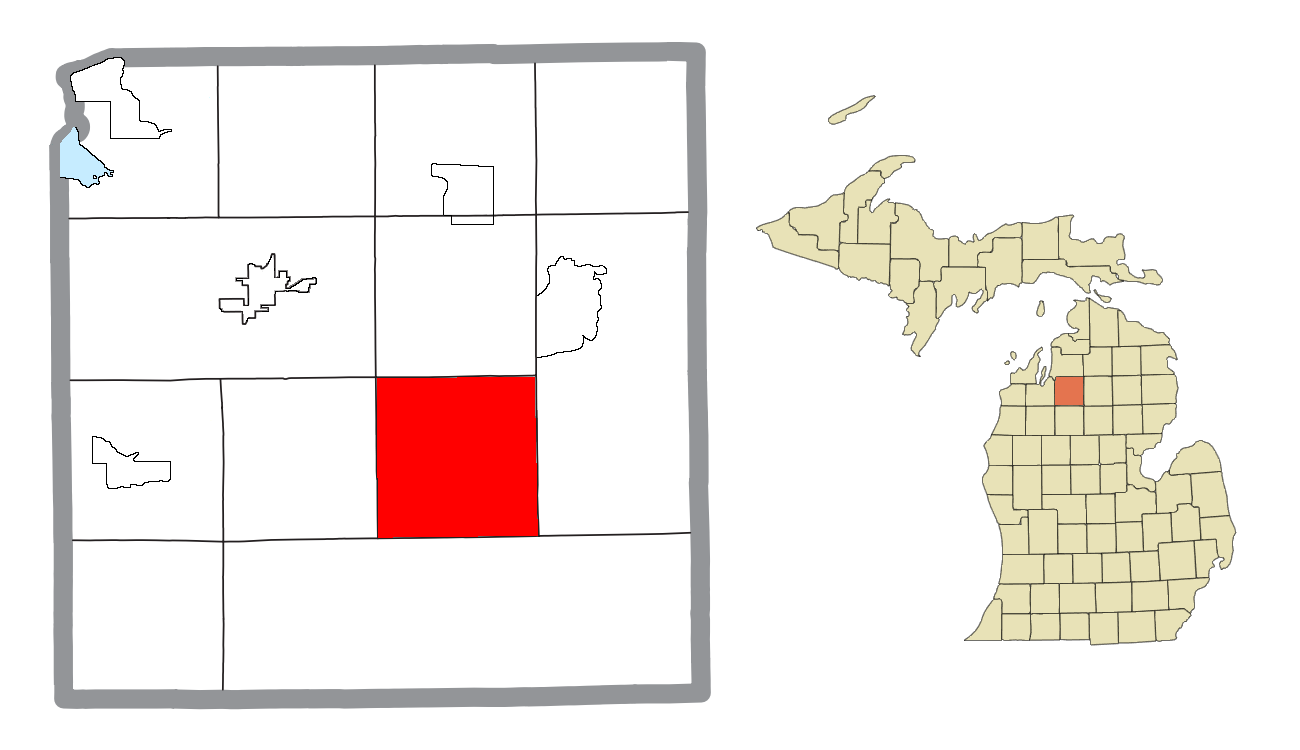
- Location within Kalkaska County

- Location within the state of Michigan Oliver Township (the United States)
- Coordinates: 44°37′51″N 85°01′25″W
- Country: United States
- State: Michigan
- County: Kalkaska
- Organized: 1881

Government
  - Supervisor: Edward Fisher
  - Clerk: Sonja Dunham

Area
  - Total: 36.04 sq mi (93.3 km^{2})
  - Land: 35.73 sq mi (92.5 km^{2})
  - Water: 0.31 sq mi (0.80 km^{2})
- Elevation: 1,112 ft (339 m)

Population (2020)
  - Total: 292
  - Density: 7.86/sq mi (3.03/km^{2})
- Time zone: UTC-5 (Eastern (EST))
  - Summer (DST): UTC-4 (EDT)
- ZIP code(s): 49633 (Fife Lake); 49646 (Kalkaska)
- Area code: 231
- FIPS code: 26-60540
- GNIS feature ID: 1626843

Oliver Township is a civil township of Kalkaska County in the U.S. state of Michigan. The population was 292 at the 2020 census, making it the least-populous township in Kalkaska County. Oliver Township is part of the Traverse City micropolitan area, and is considered part of Northern Michigan.

== History ==
Oliver Township was organized in 1881.

== Geography ==
According to the United States Census Bureau, the township has a total area of 36.04 square miles (93.34 km^{2}), of which 35.73 square miles (92.54 km^{2}) is land and 0.31 square miles (0.80 km^{2}) (0.86%) is water.

The main and north branch of the Manistee River flows through the township.

Oliver Township doesn't contain any state trunkline highways.

== Communities ==
- Sigma (44°40′12.03″N 85°3′12.17″W) is an unincorporated community in the north of the township. Sigma was established in 1910 as a station on the Manistee and North-Eastern Railroad, with an adjacent general store. A post office was established in 1914, with William T. Kirkby as the first postmaster. The post office closed in 1929.

== Demographics ==
As of the census of 2000, there were 263 people, 113 households, and 83 families residing in the township. The population density was 7.3 per square mile (2.8/km^{2}). There were 242 housing units at an average density of 6.7 units per square mile (2.6 units/km^{2}). The racial makeup of the township was 97.34% White, 1.14% Native American, and 1.52% from two or more races.

There were 113 households, out of which 23.0% had children under the age of 18 living with them, 64.6% were married couples living together, 8.0% had a female householder with no husband present, and 26.5% were non-families. 22.1% of all households were made up of individuals, and 6.2% had someone living alone who was 65 years of age or older. The average household size was 2.33 and the average family size was 2.69.

In the township the population was spread out, with 17.9% under the age of 18, 7.2% from 18 to 24, 27.0% from 25 to 44, 34.2% from 45 to 64, and 13.7% who were 65 years of age or older. The median age was 42 years. For every 100 females, there were 99.2 males. For every 100 females age 18 and over, there were 101.9 males.

The median income for a household in the township was $30,104, and the median income for a family was $32,778. Males had a median income of $24,063 versus $17,250 for females. The per capita income for the township was $15,153. About 6.4% of families and 8.4% of the population were below the poverty line, including 3.7% of those under the age of eighteen and none of those 65 or over.
