= Rapid River Township, Michigan =

- Civil township
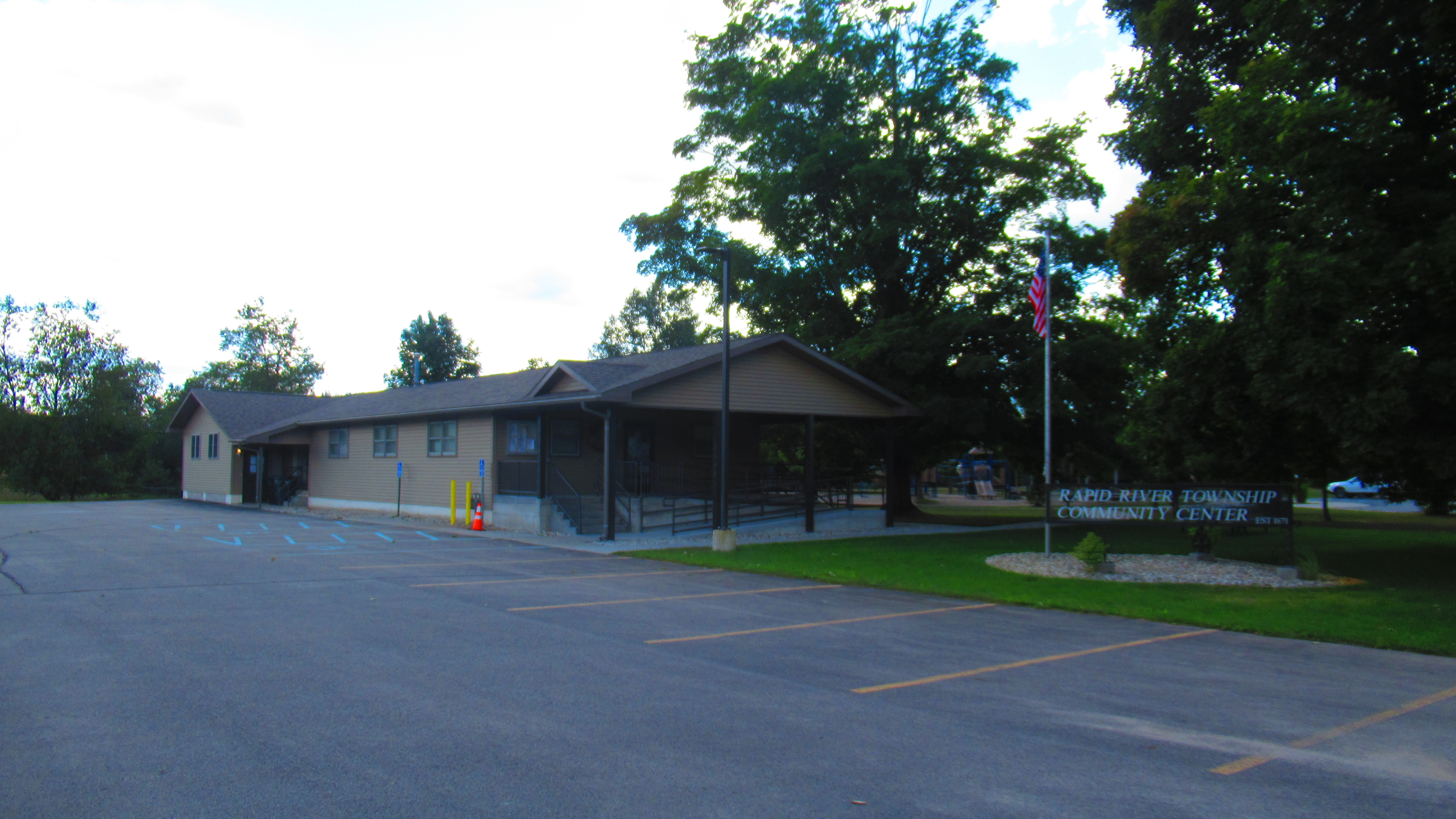
- Rapid River Township Community Center

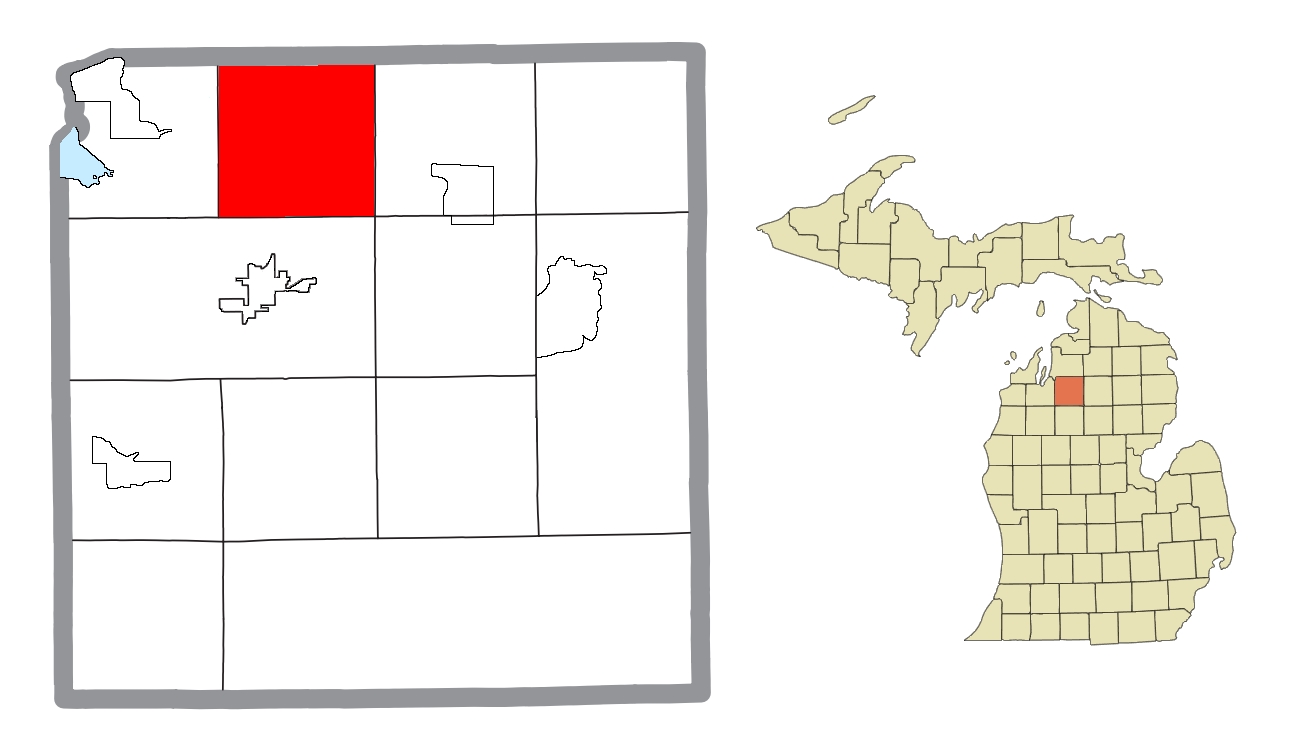
- Location within Kalkaska County

- Location within the state of Michigan Rapid River Township (the United States)
- Coordinates: 44°48′55″N 85°9′26″W
- Country: United States
- State: Michigan
- County: Kalkaska
- Established: 1871

Government
  - Supervisor: Terry Williams
  - Clerk: Valerie Hansen

Area
  - Total: 35.25 sq mi (91.3 km^{2})
  - Land: 35.13 sq mi (91.0 km^{2})
  - Water: 0.12 sq mi (0.31 km^{2})
- Elevation: 1,033 ft (315 m)

Population (2020)
  - Total: 1,245
  - Density: 32.6/sq mi (12.6/km^{2})
- Time zone: UTC-5 (Eastern (EST))
  - Summer (DST): UTC-4 (EDT)
- ZIP code(s): 49612 (Alden); 49646 (Kalkaska); 49659 (Mancelona); 49676 (Rapid City)
- Area code: 231
- FIPS code: 26-67180
- GNIS feature ID: 1626953
- Website: https://rapidrivertownshipmi.gov/

Rapid River Township is a civil township of Kalkaska County in the U.S. state of Michigan. The population was 1,245 at the 2020 census.

The township gets its name from the Rapid River, which flows through the township.

== Communities ==
- Leetsville is a former community located at 44°47′59″N 85°08′51″W. The community contained its own post office from 1875 to 1954. Today, very few buildings exist in its former location along U.S. Route 131.

== Geography ==
According to the United States Census Bureau, the township has a total area of 35.25 square miles (91.30 km^{2}), of which 35.13 square miles (90.99 km^{2}) is land and 0.12 square miles (0.31 km^{2}) (0.34%) is water.

=== Major highways ===
- US 131
- M-66

=== Adjacent townships ===
Kalkaska County

- Coldsprings Township (east)
- Kalkaska Township (south)
- Clearwater Township (west)

Antrim County

- Custer Township (north)

== Demographics ==
As of the census of 2000, there were 1,005 people, 368 households, and 269 families residing in the township. The population density was 28.6 inhabitants per square mile (11.0/km^{2}). There were 556 housing units at an average density of 15.8 per square mile (6.1/km^{2}). The racial makeup of the township was 97.41% White, 0.10% African American, 0.90% Native American, 0.50% Pacific Islander, 0.10% from other races, and 1.00% from two or more races. Hispanic or Latino of any race were 1.39% of the population.

There were 368 households, out of which 37.8% had children under the age of 18 living with them, 59.0% were married couples living together, 9.2% had a female householder with no husband present, and 26.9% were non-families. 20.9% of all households were made up of individuals, and 4.9% had someone living alone who was 65 years of age or older. The average household size was 2.69 and the average family size was 3.15.

In the township the population was spread out, with 28.8% under the age of 18, 7.3% from 18 to 24, 33.1% from 25 to 44, 22.4% from 45 to 64, and 8.5% who were 65 years of age or older. The median age was 35 years. For every 100 females, there were 105.5 males. For every 100 females age 18 and over, there were 111.8 males.

The median income for a household in the township was $37,857, and the median income for a family was $40,865. Males had a median income of $32,083 versus $20,096 for females. The per capita income for the township was $14,670. About 8.4% of families and 10.7% of the population were below the poverty line, including 15.9% of those under age 18 and 2.8% of those age 65 or over.
