= Starvation Lake =

Lake in the state of Michigan, United States

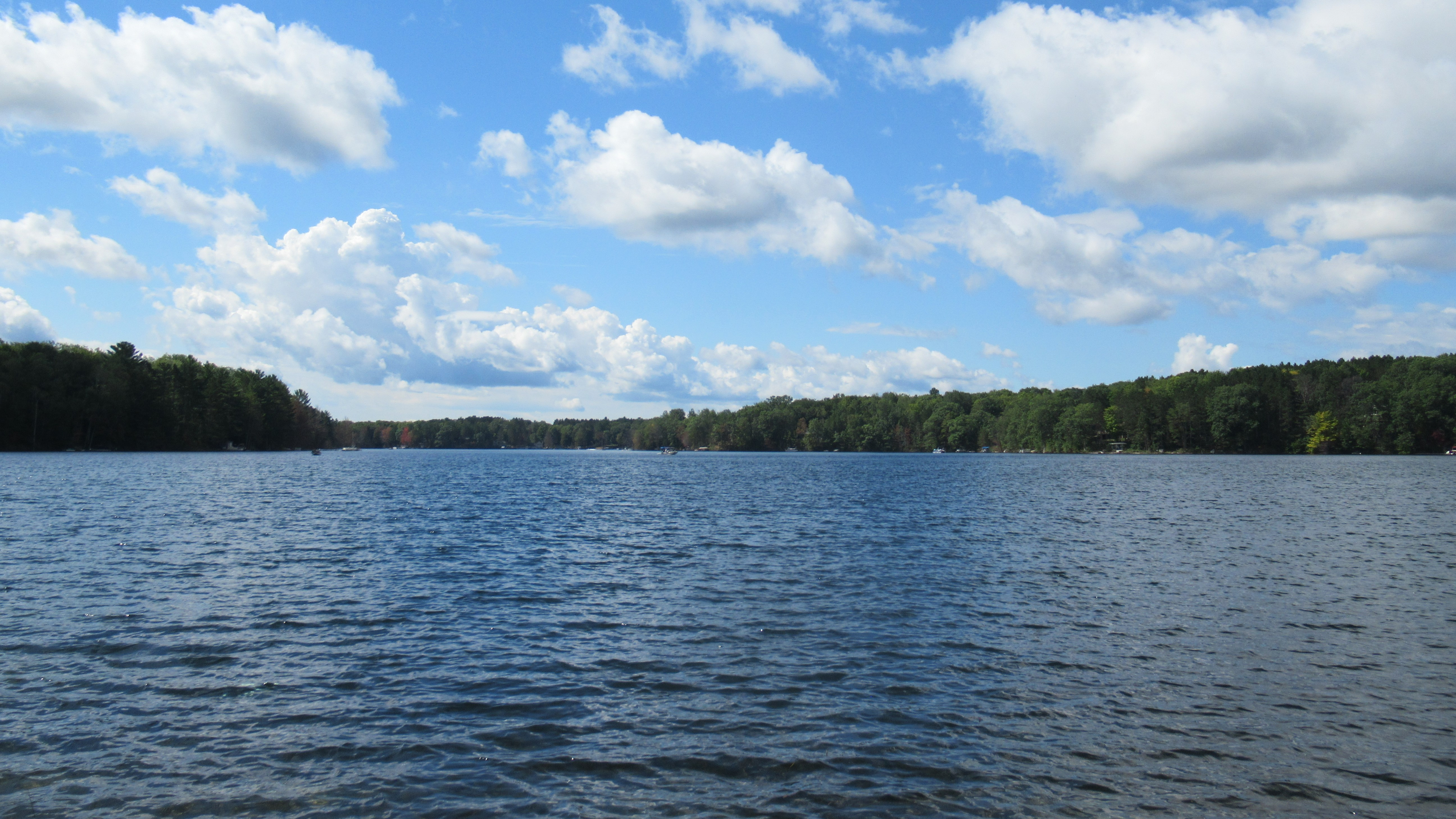
- View from the boating access site

- Location within Michigan Location within the United States
- Location: Kalkaska County, Michigan
- Coordinates: 44°50′42″N 84°57′00″W
- Type: Lake
- Primary inflows: underwater springs, precipitation
- Basin countries: United States
- Max. length: 0.8 mi (1.3 km)
- Surface area: 125 acres (0.5 km^{2})
- Max. depth: 47 ft (14 m)
- Surface elevation: 1,217 ft (371 m)

Starvation Lake is a recreational and fishing lake in Kalkaska County, in the U.S. state of Michigan. The 125-acre (0.5 km^{2}) lake is approximately 0.8 miles (1.3 km) long and has a maximum depth of 47 feet (14 m). The lake is fed primarily from submerged springs with the remainder from direct rainfall and runoff.

The unusual name has been explained in local folklore. The area around the lake, prior to being developed, was used primarily for hunting and trapping. It has been said that a hunter was setting traps near the water's edge when he got trapped in one himself. Before help could arrive he had died from starvation. Another story is that criminals were hiding out in the area, there was a snow fall and couldn't make it to town so they were stranded there and died from starvation.

== See also ==
- List of lakes in Michigan
