= Orange Township, Kalkaska County, Michigan =

Orange Township, Michigan
- Civil township
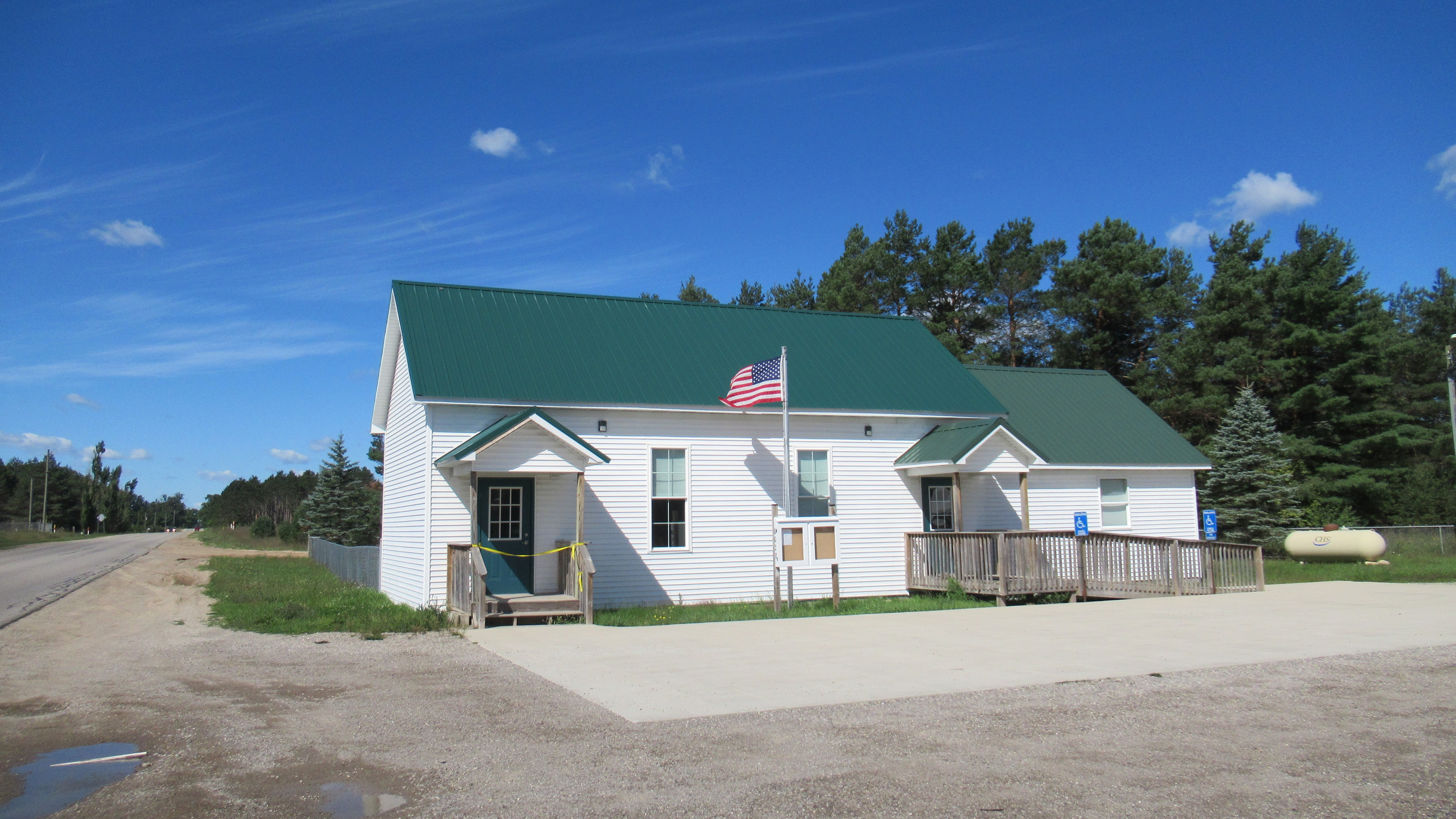
- Orange Township Hall

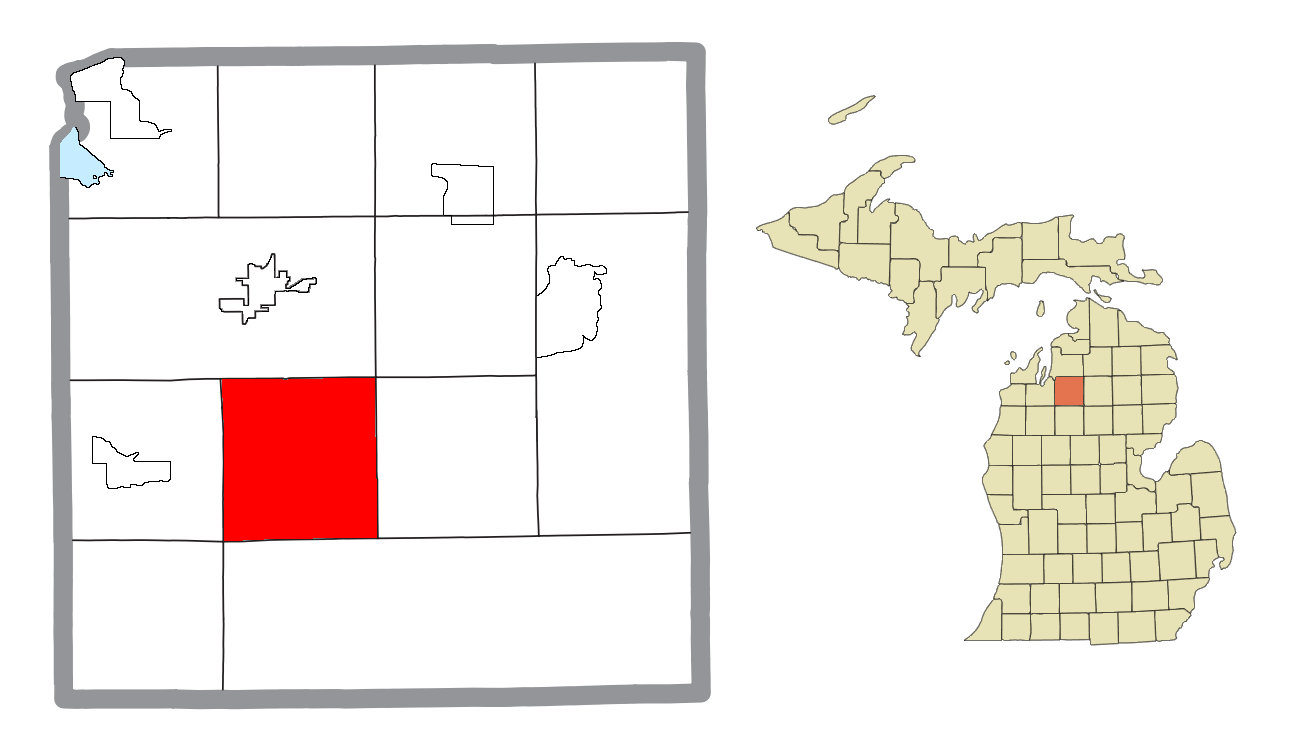
- Location within Kalkaska County

- Location within the state of Michigan Orange Township (the United States)
- Coordinates: 44°38′36″N 85°09′27″W
- Country: United States
- State: Michigan
- County: Kalkaska

Government
  - Supervisor: Trevor Ball
  - Clerk: Eric Hendricks

Area
  - Total: 34.81 sq mi (90.2 km^{2})
  - Land: 34.23 sq mi (88.7 km^{2})
  - Water: 0.58 sq mi (1.5 km^{2})
- Elevation: 1,106 ft (337 m)

Population (2020)
  - Total: 1,250
  - Density: 36/sq mi (14/km^{2})
- Time zone: UTC-5 (Eastern (EST))
  - Summer (DST): UTC-4 (EDT)
- ZIP code(s): 49633 (Fife Lake); 49646 (Kalkaska); 49680 (South Boardman)
- Area code: 231
- FIPS code: 26-60940
- GNIS feature ID: 1626854

Orange Township is a civil township of Kalkaska County in the U.S. state of Michigan. The population was 1,250 at the 2020 census.

== Communities ==
- Lodi is a former logging town located at 44°38′26″N 85°10′31″W about six miles south of Kalkaska at the junction of M-66 with Boardman Road (West) and Spencer Road SE (East). Lodi contained its own post office from 1879 to 1905.
- Spencer is a former logging town located near the intersection of Spencer Road and Golden Road. It was a stop on the Pere Marquette Railway. The post office operated from 1898 to 1912. The town had a church, freight house, general store, grocery store, hotel, lumber yard, millinery, two sawmills, schoolhouse, shoe shop and tavern.

== Geography ==
According to the United States Census Bureau, the township has a total area of 34.81 square miles (90.16 km^{2}), of which 34.23 square miles (88.66 km^{2}) is land and 0.58 square miles (1.50 km^{2}) (1.67%) is water.

== Demographics ==
As of the census of 2000, there were 1,176 people, 411 households, and 313 families residing in the township. The population density was 34.4 inhabitants per square mile (13.3/km^{2}). There were 596 housing units at an average density of 17.4 units per square mile (6.7 units/km^{2}). The racial makeup of the township was 97.79% White, 1.11% Native American, 0.09% Asian, and 1.02% from two or more races. Hispanic or Latino of any race were 1.45% of the population.

There were 411 households, out of which 41.1% had children under the age of 18 living with them, 59.9% were married couples living together, 9.7% had a female householder with no husband present, and 23.8% were non-families. 17.5% of all households were made up of individuals, and 6.1% had someone living alone who was 65 years of age or older. The average household size was 2.86 and the average family size was 3.22.

In the township the population was spread out, with 31.1% under the age of 18, 9.2% from 18 to 24, 29.0% from 25 to 44, 21.7% from 45 to 64, and 9.0% who were 65 years of age or older. The median age was 33 years. For every 100 females, there were 102.4 males. For every 100 females age 18 and over, there were 99.0 males.

The median income for a household in the township was $35,380, and the median income for a family was $38,472. Males had a median income of $30,761 versus $19,896 for females. The per capita income for the township was $15,448. About 7.1% of families and 10.0% of the population were below the poverty line, including 11.7% of those under age 18 and 9.6% of those age 65 or over.
