= Garfield Township, Kalkaska County, Michigan =

Garfield Township, Michigan
- Civil township
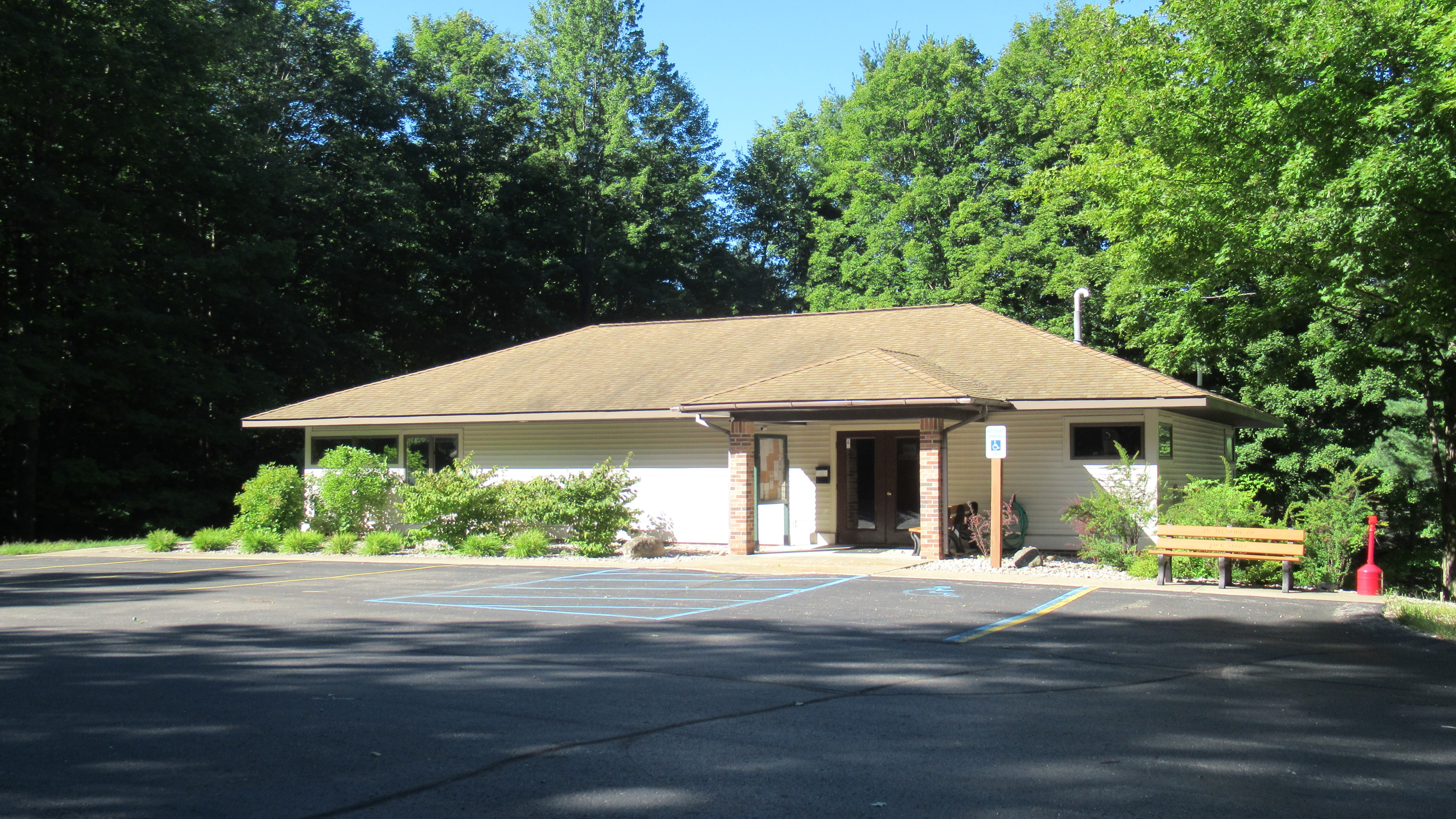
- Garfield Township Hall

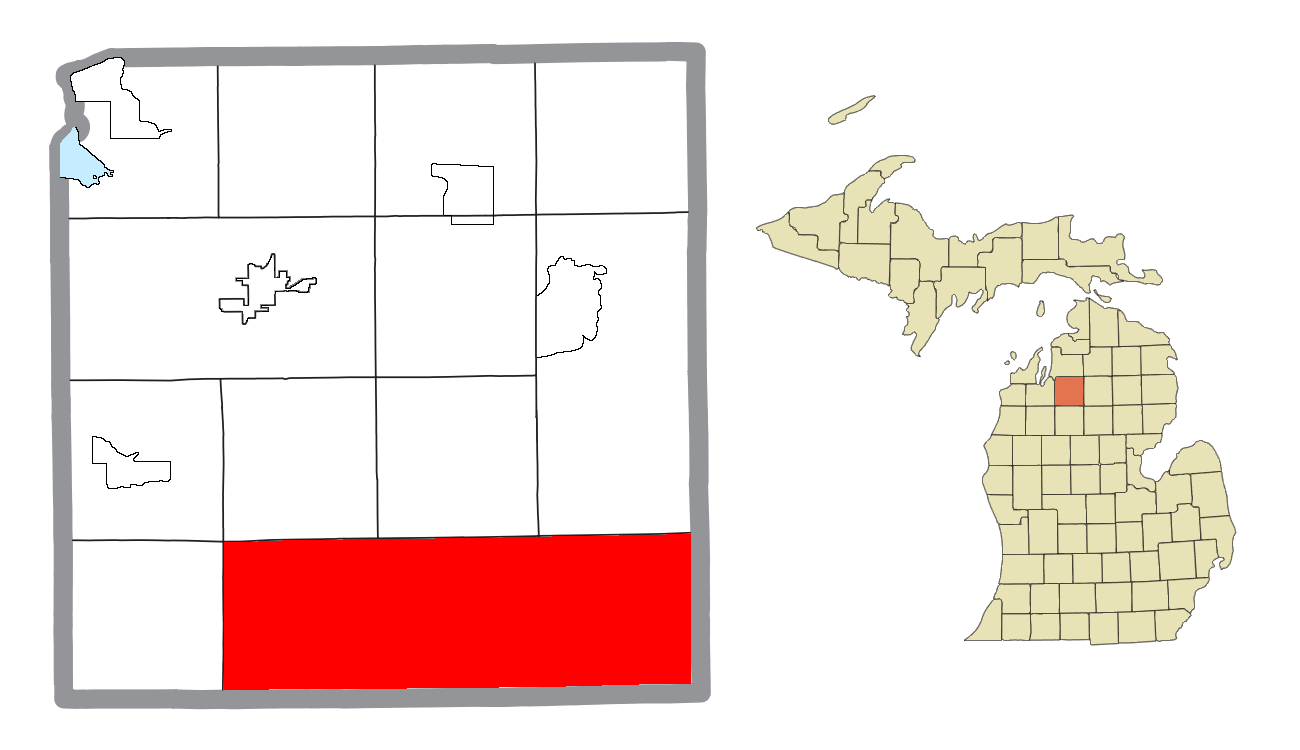
- Location within Kalkaska County

- Location within the state of Michigan Garfield Township (the United States)
- Coordinates: 44°33′03″N 85°04′42″W
- Country: United States
- State: Michigan
- County: Kalkaska

Government
  - Supervisor: David Persons
  - Clerk: Juanita Persons

Area
  - Total: 106.73 sq mi (276.4 km^{2})
  - Land: 106.16 sq mi (275.0 km^{2})
  - Water: 0.57 sq mi (1.5 km^{2})
- Elevation: 1,099 ft (335 m)

Population (2020)
  - Total: 984
  - Density: 7.57/sq mi (2.92/km^{2})
- Time zone: UTC-5 (Eastern (EST))
  - Summer (DST): UTC-4 (EDT)
- ZIP code(s): 48653 (Roscommon); 49633 (Fife Lake); 49651 (Lake City); 49680 (South Boardman); 49738 (Grayling)
- Area code: 231
- FIPS code: 26-31600
- GNIS feature ID: 1626338
- Website: https://garfieldtwsp.com/

Garfield Township is a civil township of Kalkaska County in the U.S. state of Michigan. As of the 2020 census, the township population was 984.

== Geography ==
According to the United States Census Bureau, the township has a total area of 106.73 square miles (276.43 km^{2}), of which 106.16 square miles (274.95 km^{2}) is land and 0.57 square miles (1.48 km^{2}) (0.53%) is water.

The Manistee River passes through the western portion of the township, as does the north-south highway M-66.

== Demographics ==
As of the census of 2000, there were 794 people, 331 households, and 240 families residing in the township. The population density was 7.4 inhabitants per square mile (2.9/km^{2}). There were 780 housing units at an average density of 7.3 per square mile (2.8/km^{2}). The racial makeup of the township was 97.98% White, 0.25% Asian, 0.50% from other races, and 1.26% from two or more races. Hispanic or Latino of any race were 1.13% of the population.

There were 331 households, out of which 22.4% had children under the age of 18 living with them, 64.4% were married couples living together, 4.5% had a female householder with no husband present, and 27.2% were non-families. 22.1% of all households were made up of individuals, and 9.4% had someone living alone who was 65 years of age or older. The average household size was 2.40 and the average family size was 2.76.

In the township the population was spread out, with 22.4% under the age of 18, 5.0% from 18 to 24, 24.2% from 25 to 44, 30.1% from 45 to 64, and 18.3% who were 65 years of age or older. The median age was 42 years. For every 100 females, there were 107.3 males. For every 100 females age 18 and over, there were 108.8 males.

The median income for a household in the township was $34,444, and the median income for a family was $36,500. Males had a median income of $31,607 versus $24,250 for females. The per capita income for the township was $15,552. About 11.7% of families and 11.9% of the population were below the poverty line, including 9.9% of those under age 18 and 13.6% of those age 65 or over.
