= Kalkaska Township, Michigan =

Civil township in Michigan, United States

- Civil township
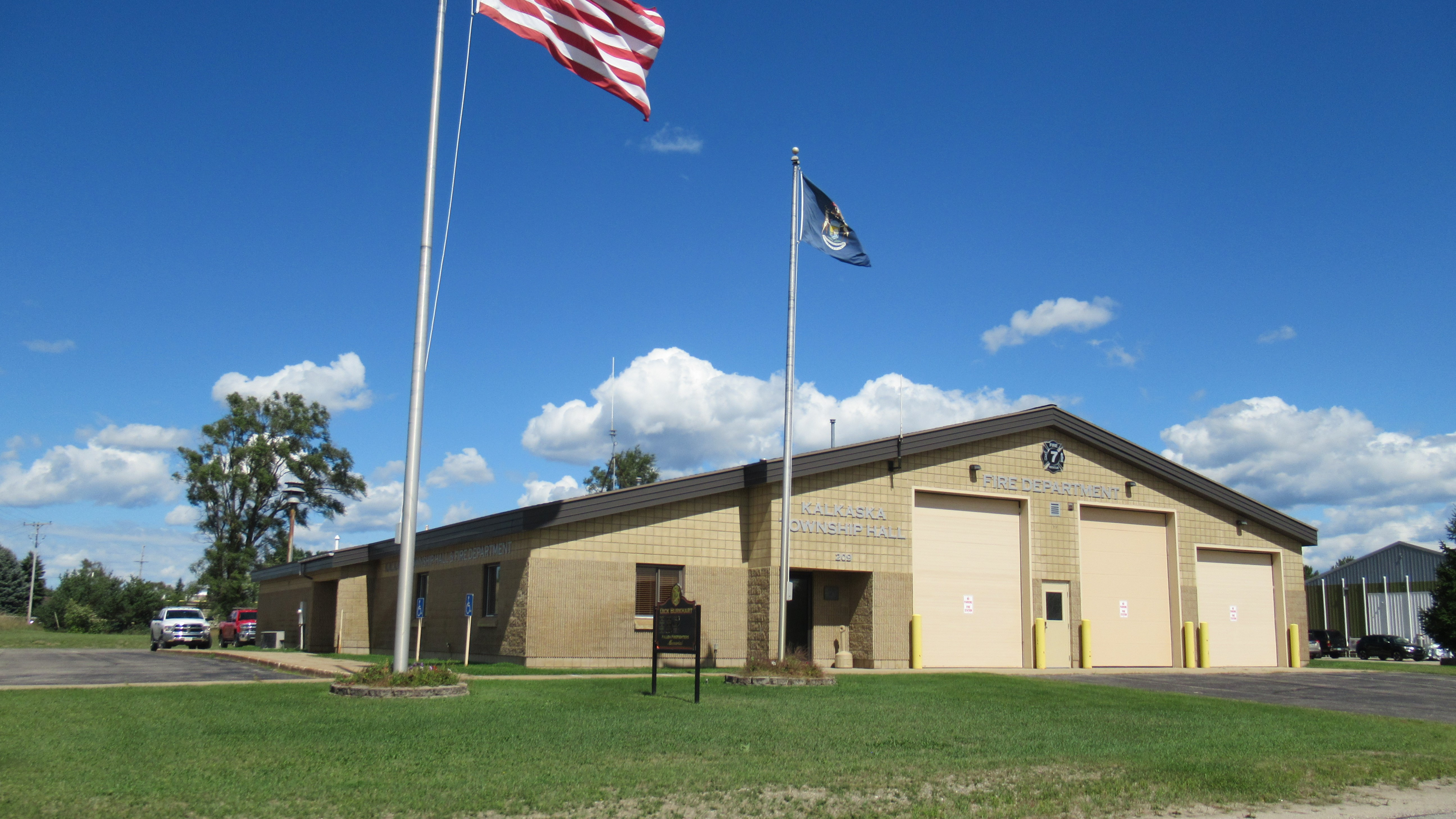
- Kalkaska Township Hall and Fire Department

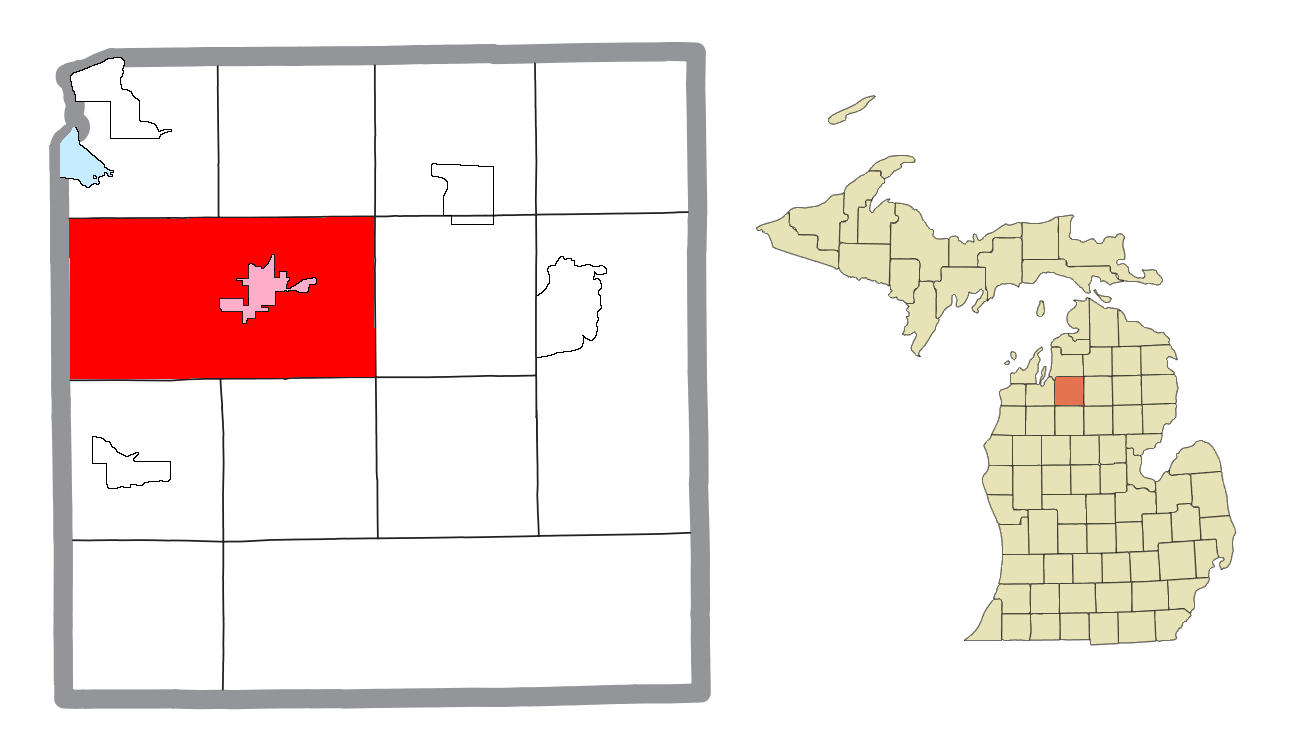
- Location within Kalkaska County (red) and the administered village of Kalkaska (pink)

- Location within the state of Michigan Kalkaska Township (the United States)
- Coordinates: 44°43′55″N 85°11′33″W
- Country: United States
- State: Michigan
- County: Kalkaska

Government
  - Supervisor: Michael Winter
  - Clerk: Connie Winter

Area
  - Total: 71.23 sq mi (184.5 km^{2})
  - Land: 70.44 sq mi (182.4 km^{2})
  - Water: 0.79 sq mi (2.0 km^{2})
- Elevation: 1,030 ft (314 m)

Population (2020)
  - Total: 2,895
  - Density: 67/sq mi (26/km^{2})
- Time zone: UTC-5 (Eastern (EST))
  - Summer (DST): UTC-4 (EDT)
- ZIP code(s): 49646 (Kalkaska); 49676 (Rapid City); 49690 (Williamsburg)
- Area code: 231
- FIPS code: 26-42280
- GNIS feature ID: 1626550
- Website: https://kalkaskatownship.net/

Kalkaska Township (/kælˈkæskə/ kal-KASS-kə) is a civil township of Kalkaska County in the U.S. state of Michigan. The population was 2,895 at the 2020 census. The township contains the village of Kalkaska, which serves as the county seat. The western half of the township was formerly a separate township, known as Wilson Township.

== Geography ==
According to the United States Census Bureau, the township has a total area of 71.23 square miles (184.5 km^{2}), of which 70.44 square miles (182.4 km^{2}) is land and 0.79 square miles (2.0 km^{2}) (1.11%) is water.

=== Major highway ===
- US 131 runs northeast–southwest through the township. Northeast of Kalkaska Township, US 131 runs through Mancelona, Alba, and Walloon Lake, before ending at US 31 in Petoskey. To the southwest, US 131 passes through Fife Lake before upgrading to a freeway. The highway continues south, passing through Cadillac, Grand Rapids, and Kalamazoo, before ending just south of the Indiana state line.
- M-66 also runs north–south through Kalkaska Township. The highway continues northeast, with US 131, into Mancelona, before turning north. The highway then runs through East Jordan before ending at US 31 in Charlevoix. To the south, M-66 runs through towns like Lake City, McBain and Marion. M-66 also eventually ends at the Indiana state line, just south of Sturgis.
- M-72 runs east–west through Kalkaska County, and enters Kalkaska Township from the northwest. West of Kalkaska Township, M-72 runs through the Traverse City urban area, ending at Empire, on Lake Michigan. East of Kalkaska Township, M-72 runs through Grayling and Mio before eventually ending at a junction with US 23 in Harrisville, on Lake Huron.

== Demographics ==
At the 2000 census, there were 4,830 people, 1,854 households and 1,255 families residing in the township. The population density was 68.7 per square mile (26.5/km^{2}). There were 2,220 housing units at an average density of 31.6 per square mile (12.2/km^{2}). The racial make-up was 96.89% White, 0.46% African American, 1.04% Native American, 0.46% Asian, 0.06% from other races and 1.10% from two or more races. Hispanic or Latino of any race were 0.81% of the population.

There were 1,854 households, of which 34.7% had children under the age of 18 living with them, 49.8% were married couples living together, 13.1% had a female householder with no husband present, and 32.3% were non-families. 26.3% of all households were made up of individuals, and 10.4% had someone living alone who was 65 years of age or older. The average household size was 2.52 and the average family size was 3.01.

26.9% of the population were under the age of 18, 9.2% from 18 to 24, 28.9% from 25 to 44, 21.4% from 45 to 64 and 13.6% were 65 years of age or older. The median age was 35 years. For every 100 females, there were 94.2 males. For every 100 females age 18 and over, there were 90.1 males.

The median household income was $36,278 and the median family income was $42,054. Males had a median income of $32,403 and females $21,453. The per capita income was $16,595. About 10.6% of families and 12.5% of the population were below the poverty line, including 18.2% of those under age 18 and 11.1% of those age 65 or over.

== Recent News ==
In November 2025, Rocklocker, a data center developer out of Traverse City, put forth a proposal to develop a data center within the township. The proposed facility would sit on 1,440 acres of state land with its own power plant and carbon capture and storage system. Kalkaska officials are supporting the data center on the basis of tax revenue and job creation, residents are opposed based on environmental and local impact concerns.
