= Kalkaska, Michigan =

- Village
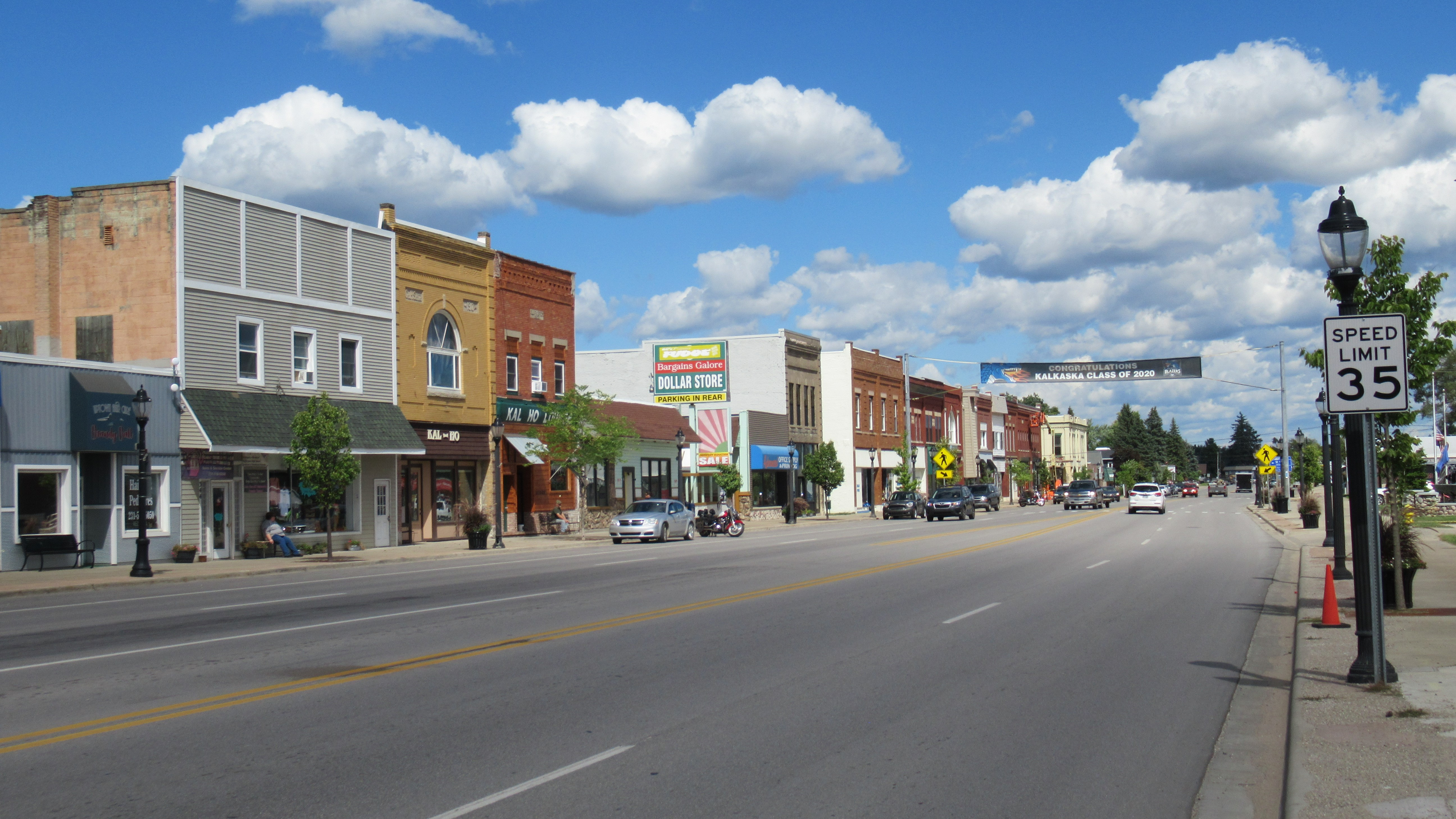
- Downtown Kalkaska along Cedar Street
- Nickname(s): "Trout Capital of Michigan", "Kasky"
- Motto: "Space to Grow"
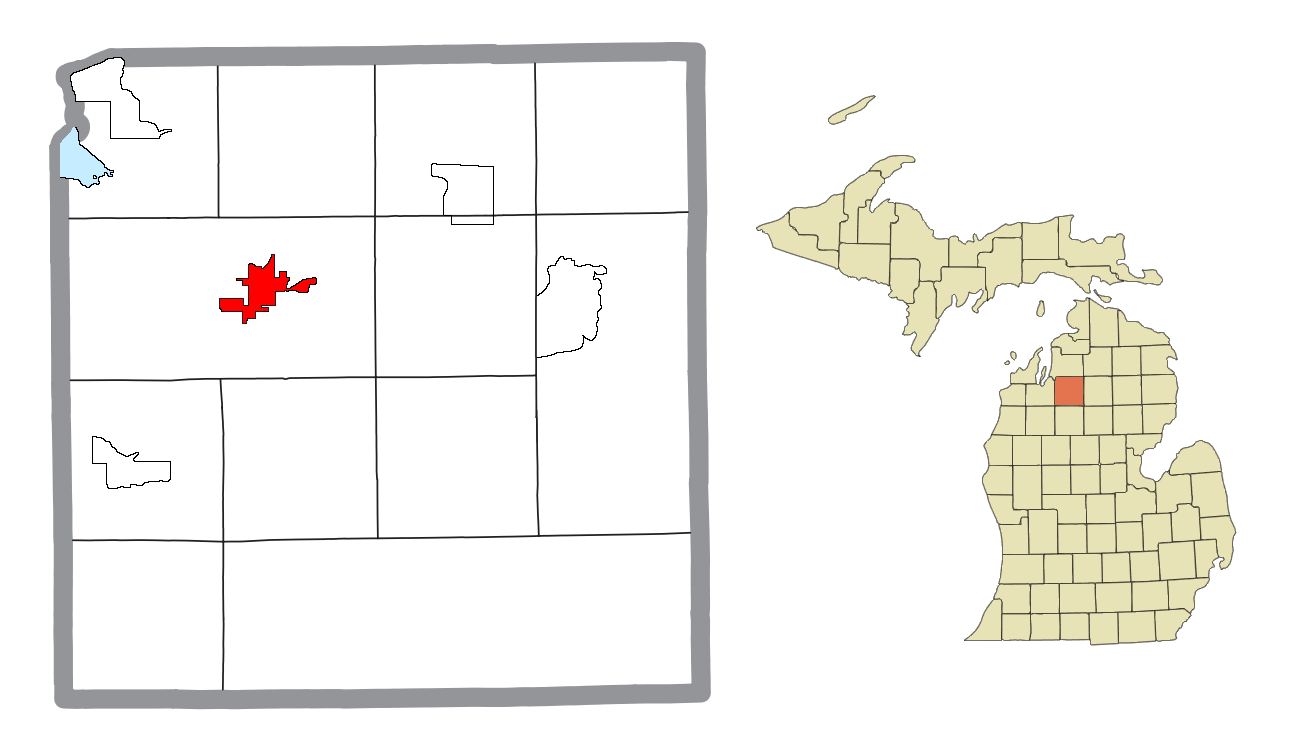
- Location within Kalkaska County

- Location within the state of Michigan Location within the United States
- Coordinates: 44°44′04″N 85°10′48″W
- Country: United States
- State: Michigan
- County: Kalkaska
- Township: Kalkaska
- Platted: 1873
- Incorporated: 1887
- Founded by: Albert A. Abbott

Government
  - Type: Village council
  - President: Robert Larsen
  - Clerk: Angie Koon

Area
  - Total: 2.69 sq mi (6.96 km^{2})
  - Land: 2.64 sq mi (6.83 km^{2})
  - Water: 0.050 sq mi (0.13 km^{2})
- Elevation: 1,033 ft (315 m)

Population (2020)
  - Total: 2,132
  - Density: 808.7/sq mi (312.25/km^{2})
- Demonym: Kalkaskian(s)
- Time zone: UTC−5 (Eastern (EST))
  - Summer (DST): UTC−4 (EDT)
- ZIP code(s): 49646
- Area code: 231
- FIPS code: 26-42260
- GNIS feature ID: 0629450
- Website: Official website

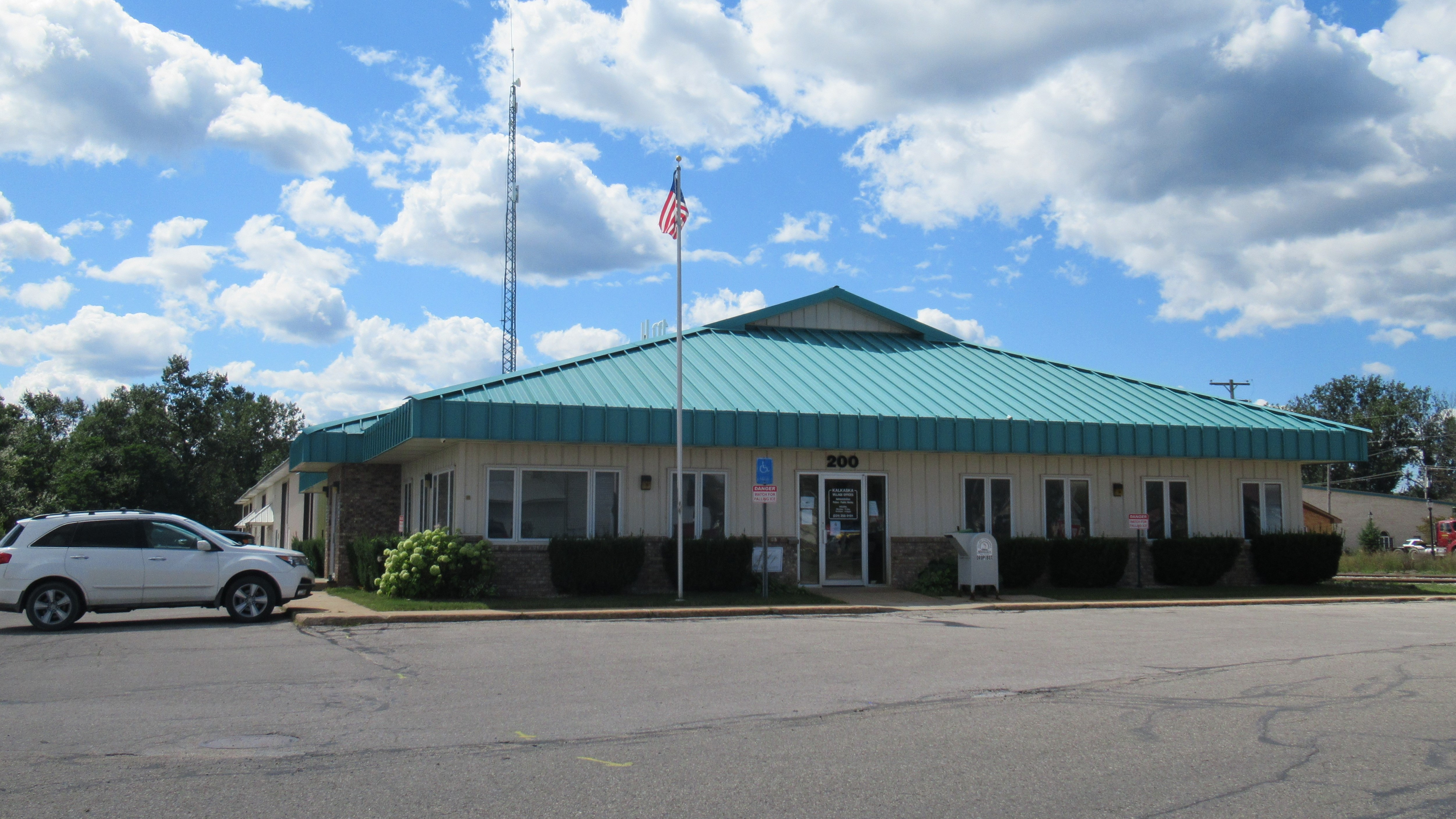
Kalkaska Village Offices

Kalkaska (/kælˈkæskə/ kal-KASS-kə) is a village in the U.S. state of Michigan. It is the county seat and only incorporated municipality in Kalkaska County. The village had a population of 2,132 at the 2020 census.

Kalkaska is located within Kalkaska Township and is part of the Traverse City metropolitan area. The village has hosted the National Trout Festival since 1935.

== History ==
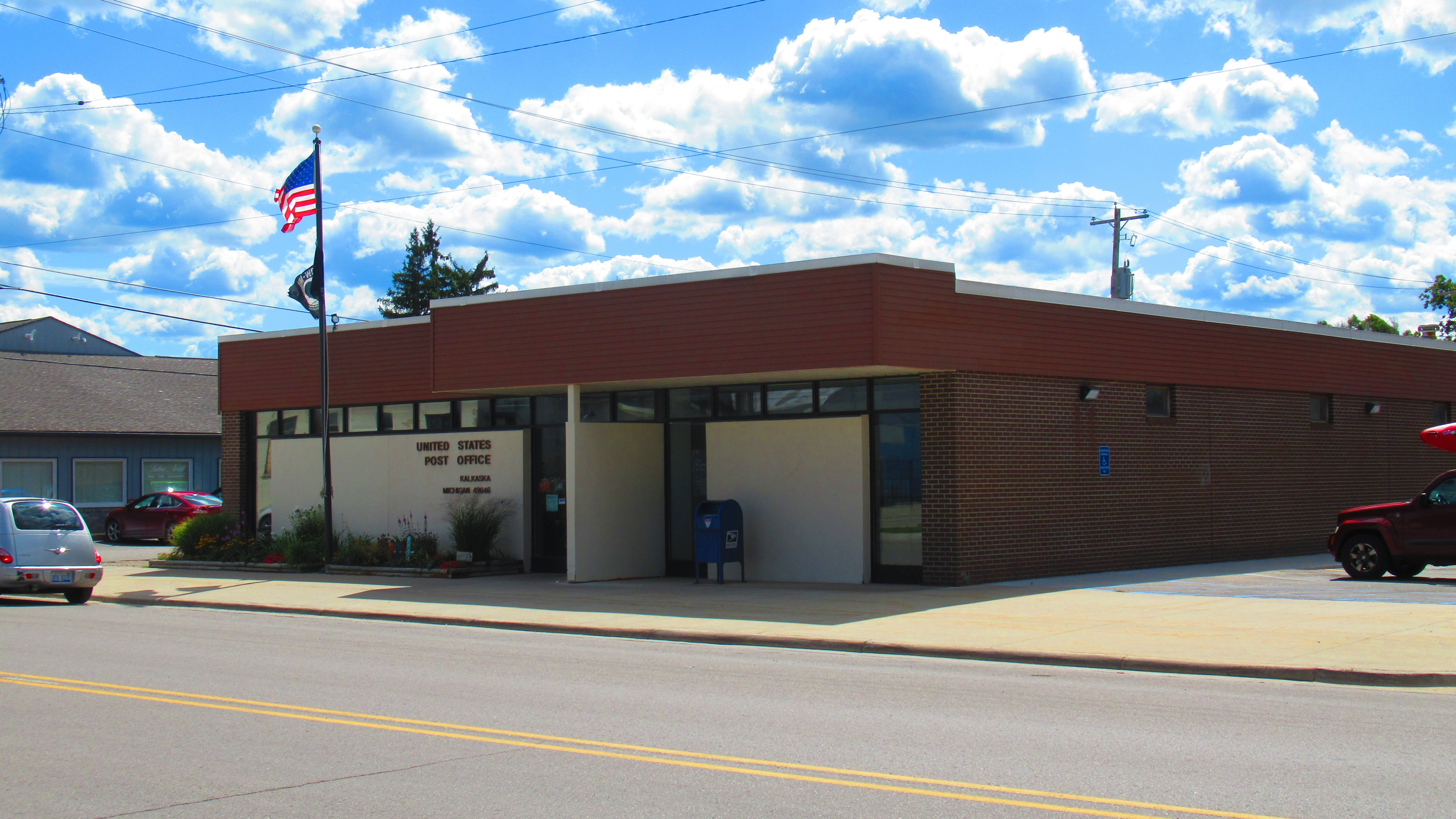
U.S. Post Office in Kalkaska

In 1872, Albert A. Abbott arrived here from Decatur, and the following year, platted his land and became the first postmaster. In 1874, Kalkaska became a station on a new Pennsylvania Railroad line from Walton to Petoskey. Today, this line is part of the Great Lakes Central Railroad.

On July 5, 1908, a fire began in the middle of the business block and burned most of the stores. Local photographer E. L. Beebe took a number of photographs of the fire; the resulting postcards were widely sold and can still be found today. Two years later, another fire started in downtown Kalkaska. Again, in 1925, downtown Kalkaska was devastated by the largest fire since the fire of 1908.

In 1916, noted author Ernest Hemingway visited and fished in Kalkaska, and later immortalized the town in his story "The Battler". A historical marker has been placed at the nearby Rugg Pond, on the Rapid River, where Hemingway reportedly fished one night from the power house.

On July 10, 1951, the Kalkaska State Bank was robbed by an armed man, who fled and later attempted to escape on foot through a nearby swampy area. After three days of what was termed the largest manhunt in Northern Michigan history, involving the FBI and local and state authorities, the gunman, Raymond J. Turcotte, who had a long string of prior convictions, including manslaughter, was captured south of the town. Turcotte confessed to the bank robbery and served 18 years in the Michigan State Prison in Jackson, including a term for escape in 1961.

Discovery of natural gas and oil in the area during the 1970s led to significant growth for the village, but the growth has since shifted toward tourism.

In 1993, the Kalkaska schools made national headlines when a financial crisis resulted in a two-month-long closure. Subsequent funding reform improved the outlook for Kalkaska and similar small rural districts in Michigan.

In 2014, Walmart announced plans to open a store in Kalkaska. Previously, the closest store was in Traverse City, over 20 miles away. A debate in Kalkaska ensued on whether the community's small-town character could be preserved. The store was never built due to Walmart's decision to restructure growth plans.

The Record Eagle reported in 2019 that Kalkaska was poised for substantial growth due to housing shortages in the Traverse City area.

== Geography ==
According to the United States Census Bureau, the village has a total area of 2,029 acres (821 ha), of which 32 acres (13 ha) are covered by water.

The North Branch of the Boardman River flows through the south of the village. The river continues west into neighboring Grand Traverse County, turns north, and empties into Grand Traverse Bay, a bay of Lake Michigan. Just to the north of the village, though, are the headwaters of the Little Rapid River. This stream also flows into the Grand Traverse Bay, although it is part of the Chain of Lakes watershed.

Kalkaska experiences a notable amount of snowfall, as it is located in a snowbelt that receives heavy amounts of lake-effect snow from Lake Michigan.

=== Climate ===
This climatic region has large seasonal temperature differences, with warm to hot (and often humid) summers and cold (sometimes severely cold) winters. According to the Köppen climate classification, Kalkaska has a humid continental climate, Dfb on climate maps.

Climate data for Kalkaska, Michigan, 1991–2020 normals, 1974-2020 extremes: 1035ft (315m)
Month	Jan	Feb	Mar	Apr	May	Jun	Jul	Aug	Sep	Oct	Nov	Dec	Year
Record high °F (°C)	58 (14)	62 (17)	85 (29)	86 (30)	89 (32)	94 (34)	97 (36)	96 (36)	92 (33)	85 (29)	75 (24)	63 (17)	97 (36)
Mean maximum °F (°C)	44.4 (6.9)	47.5 (8.6)	60.3 (15.7)	74.2 (23.4)	84.0 (28.9)	89.2 (31.8)	89.8 (32.1)	88.2 (31.2)	84.8 (29.3)	76.3 (24.6)	61.3 (16.3)	48.6 (9.2)	91.8 (33.2)
Mean daily maximum °F (°C)	25.5 (−3.6)	28.0 (−2.2)	38.3 (3.5)	51.3 (10.7)	65.1 (18.4)	74.8 (23.8)	78.8 (26.0)	77.0 (25.0)	69.6 (20.9)	55.9 (13.3)	42.0 (5.6)	31.1 (−0.5)	53.1 (11.7)
Daily mean °F (°C)	18.0 (−7.8)	18.8 (−7.3)	27.4 (−2.6)	40.2 (4.6)	53.2 (11.8)	63.1 (17.3)	66.9 (19.4)	65.3 (18.5)	58.0 (14.4)	46.2 (7.9)	34.6 (1.4)	24.7 (−4.1)	43.0 (6.1)
Mean daily minimum °F (°C)	10.6 (−11.9)	9.5 (−12.5)	16.4 (−8.7)	29.1 (−1.6)	41.2 (5.1)	51.3 (10.7)	55.0 (12.8)	53.6 (12.0)	46.4 (8.0)	36.5 (2.5)	27.3 (−2.6)	18.4 (−7.6)	32.9 (0.5)
Mean minimum °F (°C)	−12.0 (−24.4)	−12.0 (−24.4)	−8.3 (−22.4)	13.6 (−10.2)	26.3 (−3.2)	34.8 (1.6)	41.2 (5.1)	40.5 (4.7)	32.1 (0.1)	24.2 (−4.3)	11.9 (−11.2)	−0.8 (−18.2)	−17.4 (−27.4)
Record low °F (°C)	−32 (−36)	−34 (−37)	−29 (−34)	−4 (−20)	19 (−7)	29 (−2)	33 (1)	32 (0)	23 (−5)	19 (−7)	−2 (−19)	−18 (−28)	−34 (−37)
Average precipitation inches (mm)	2.00 (51)	1.50 (38)	1.71 (43)	2.91 (74)	3.28 (83)	3.28 (83)	3.09 (78)	2.98 (76)	3.68 (93)	4.15 (105)	2.93 (74)	2.16 (55)	33.67 (853)
Average snowfall inches (cm)	38.30 (97.3)	24.80 (63.0)	13.70 (34.8)	6.80 (17.3)	0.70 (1.8)	0.00 (0.00)	0.00 (0.00)	0.00 (0.00)	0.00 (0.00)	1.00 (2.5)	17.10 (43.4)	29.70 (75.4)	132.1 (335.5)
Average precipitation days (≥ 0.01 in)	17.0	12.2	10.4	11.3	11.7	9.8	9.9	9.8	11.0	14.7	14.9	15.7	148.4
Average snowy days (≥ 0.1 in)	14.3	10.7	6.2	2.8	0.3	0.0	0.0	0.0	0.0	0.7	6.4	12.2	53.6
Source 1: NOAA
Source 2: XMACIS2 (records & monthly max/min)

== Demographics ==
Historical population
Census	Pop.	Note	%±
1880	496		—
1890	1,161		134.1%
1900	1,304		12.3%
1910	1,415		8.5%
1920	866		−38.8%
1930	861		−0.6%
1940	1,132		31.5%
1950	1,250		10.4%
1960	1,321		5.7%
1970	1,475		11.7%
1980	1,654		12.1%
1990	1,952		18.0%
2000	2,226		14.0%
2010	2,020		−9.3%
2020	2,132		5.5%
U.S. Decennial Census

=== 2020 census ===
As of the 2020 census, Kalkaska had a population of 2,132. The median age was 42.7 years. 20.3% of residents were under the age of 18 and 23.4% of residents were 65 years of age or older. For every 100 females there were 87.5 males, and for every 100 females age 18 and over there were 81.8 males age 18 and over.

0.0% of residents lived in urban areas, while 100.0% lived in rural areas.

There were 899 households in Kalkaska, of which 26.4% had children under the age of 18 living in them. Of all households, 31.4% were married-couple households, 20.7% were households with a male householder and no spouse or partner present, and 38.3% were households with a female householder and no spouse or partner present. About 37.8% of all households were made up of individuals and 18.3% had someone living alone who was 65 years of age or older.

There were 1,000 housing units, of which 10.1% were vacant. The homeowner vacancy rate was 2.1% and the rental vacancy rate was 6.7%.

Racial composition as of the 2020 census
Race	Number	Percent
White	1,968	92.3%
Black or African American	4	0.2%
American Indian and Alaska Native	21	1.0%
Asian	11	0.5%
Native Hawaiian and Other Pacific Islander	0	0.0%
Some other race	14	0.7%
Two or more races	114	5.3%
Hispanic or Latino (of any race)	46	2.2%

=== 2010 census ===
As of the census of 2010, 2,020 people, 871 households, and 482 families resided in the village. The population density was 647.4 inhabitants per square mile (250.0/km^{2}). The 1,015 housing units had an average density of 325.3 per square mile (125.6/km^{2}). The racial makeup of the village was 95.6% White, 0.6% African American, 1.3% Native American, 0.6% Asian, 0.2% from other races, and 1.7% from two or more races. Hispanics or Latinos of any race were 1.8% of the population.

Of the 871 households, 29.2% had children under 18 living with them, 33.4% were married couples living together, 16.0% had a female householder with no husband present, 6.0% had a male householder with no wife present, and 44.7% were not families. About 38.6% of all households were made up of individuals, and 18.3% had someone living alone who was 65 or older. The average household size was 2.22, and the average family size was 2.90.

The median age in the village was 37.9 years; 23.4% of residents were under 18; 9.8% were between 18 and 24; 25.3% were 25 to 44; 24.3% were 45 to 64; and 17.1% were 65 or older. The gender makeup of the village was 46.9% male and 53.1% female.

=== 2000 census ===
As of the census of 2000, 2,226 people, 881 households, and 540 families lived in the village. The population density was 890.7 inhabitants per square mile (343.9/km^{2}). The 969 housing units had an average density of 387.7 per square mile (149.7/km^{2}). The racial makeup of the village was 96.32% White, 0.67% African American, 1.03% Native American, 0.72% Asian, 0.04% from other races, and 1.21% from two or more races. Hispanics or Latinos of any race were 0.94% of the population.

Of the 881 households, 33.7% had children under 18 living with them, 38.3% were married couples living together, 18.3% had a female householder with no husband present, and 38.6% were not families. Around 32.8% of all households were made up of individuals, and 14.3% had someone living alone who was 65 or older. The average household size was 2.35, and the average family size was 2.94.

In the village, the age distribution of the population shows 26.1% under 18, 10.6% from 18 to 24, 26.7% from 25 to 44, 19.4% from 45 to 64, and 17.2% who were 65 or older. The median age was 35 years. For every 100 females, there were 88.3 males. For every 100 females 18 and over, there were 82.5 males.

The median income for a household in the village was $27,891, and for a family was $33,651. Males had a median income of $26,901 versus $19,333 for females. The per capita income for the village was $13,028. About 15.3% of families and 16.4% of the population were below the poverty line, including 19.7% of those under age 18 and 19.4% of those age 65 or over.

== Economy ==
Marijuana, service, oil and gas, manufacturing, and tourism are important industries in the village and surrounding county.

The Kalkaska area is known as a fishing destination with inland lakes and the Boardman, Rapid, and Manistee Rivers. Kalkaska has held the National Trout Festival in the last week of April each year since 1933. A giant statue of a brook trout is in the town square. The New York Times featured-author Jim Harrison wrote about the festival in his 1991 book Just Before Dark: Collected Non-fiction.

== Arts and culture ==
Tourists are attracted to the area to visit the surrounding lakes (including Torch Lake) and rivers such as the Jordan River, Rapid River, and Manistee River. Kalkaska offers two major festivals, the National Trout Festival held at the end of April to honor the opening of trout season, and the Kalkaska County Agricultural Fair, held the first week of August, to showcase local livestock from 4-H youth clubs, handicrafts from residents, and entertainment. Fall foliage color tours are also popular with visitors.

The first weekend of November brings with it the Iceman Cometh biking race. Kalkaska is host to the starting line for a 27.2-mile off-road biking race that runs from the western edge of the village to Traverse City along the VASA Trail. The turnout of the race is double the population of the village, numbering several thousand. For mountain biking enthusiasts, it is a famous race, and completing the race is an achievement in itself.

The village is home to Chalker Park and the Imagination Station. The Mill Pond Park is a small park with a pavilion.

The Kalkaska Area Recreation Transportation (KART) Trail is a nonmotorized pathway that encircles the county's governmental, educational, and recreational campuses. Expansion plans for it include connecting it with the TART Trail.

Kalkaska is home to the Kalkaska Battlers who play in the Kaliseum. A recreational facility in the village.

== Education ==
Schools in Kalkaska are administered by Kalkaska Public Schools. One high school is in the district, Kalkaska High School.

== Infrastructure ==
=== Transportation ===
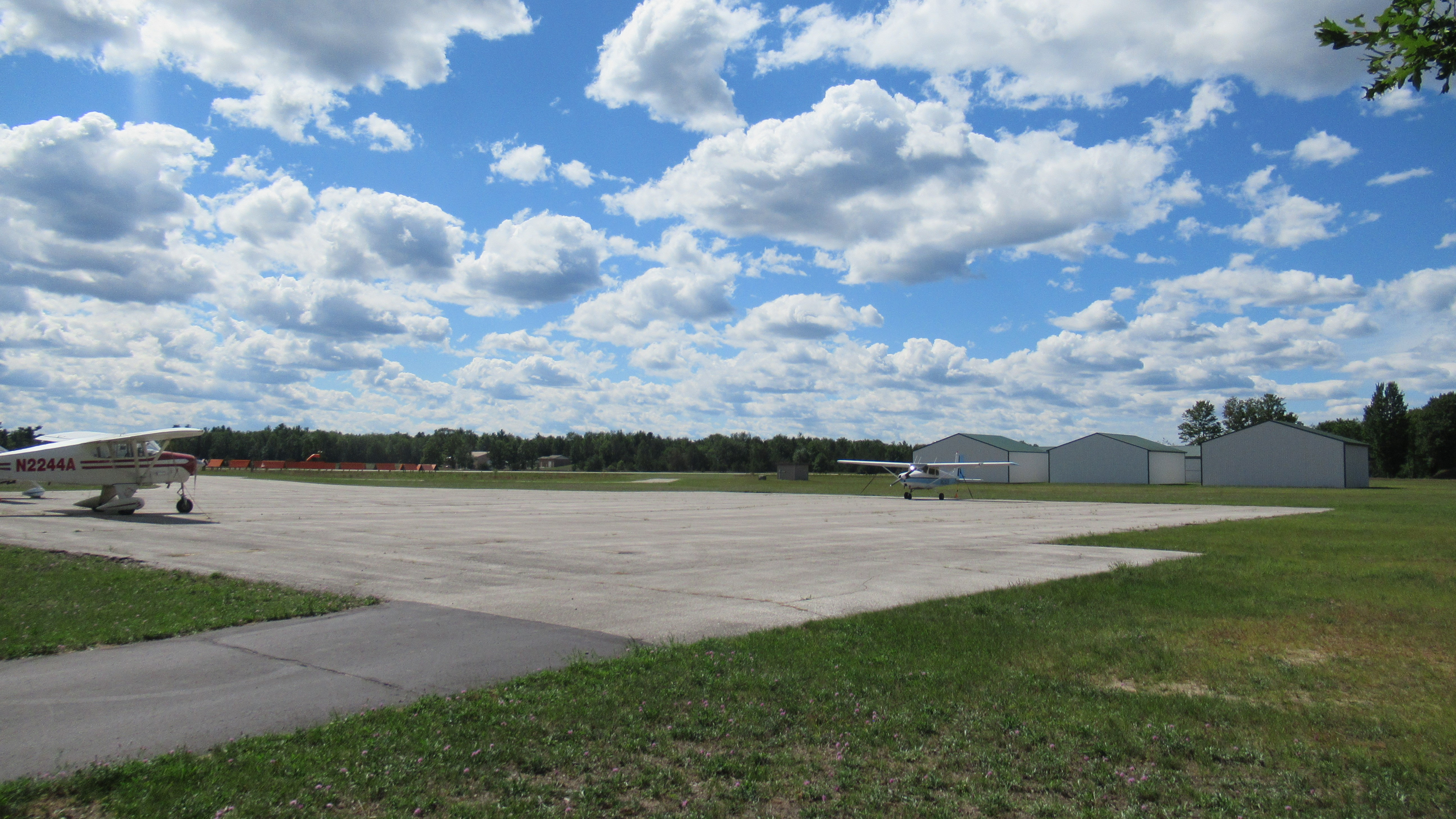
Kalkaska City Airport

==== Airport ====
Kalkaska City Airport has a paved runway.

==== Major highways ====
- U.S. Route 131
- M-66
- M-72

== Notable people ==
- Emil Frisk (1874–1922), professional baseball player for the Cincinnati Reds, Detroit Tigers, and St. Louis Browns from 1899 to 1907
- Renee Raudman, voice and television actress
- Ron Ryckman Sr., member of the Kansas Senate
- Betty Wanless (1928–1995), All-American Girls Professional Baseball League player
- Ron Winter, former NCAA and NFL official

== See also ==
- Kalkaska sand
