= Hughes =

Hughes may refer to:

== People ==
- Hughes (given name), including a list of people with the given name
- Hughes (surname), including a list of people with the surname

== Places ==
=== Antarctica ===
- Hughes Range (Antarctica), Ross Dependency
- Mount Hughes, Oates Land
- Hughes Basin, Oates Land
- Hughes Bay, Graham Land
- Hughes Bluff, Victoria Land
- Hughes Glacier, Victoria Land
- Hughes Island, Victoria Land
- Hughes Peninsula, Ellsworth Land
- Hughes Point, Ellsworth Land

=== Australia ===
- Hughes, Australian Capital Territory
- Hughes, Northern Territory
  - Hughes Airfield
- Division of Hughes, an electoral district in New South Wales

=== United States ===
- Hughes, Alaska
  - Hughes Airport (Alaska)
- Hughes, Arkansas
- Hughes, Iowa
- Hughes, Wisconsin
- Hughes County, Oklahoma
- Hughes County, South Dakota
- Hughes Lake (California)
- Hughes Mountain, Missouri
- Hughes River (Virginia)
- Hughes River (West Virginia)

=== Elsewhere ===
- Hughes Range (British Columbia), Canada
- Hughes Reef, South China Sea
- 1878 Hughes, an asteroid

== Companies ==
- Hughes Aircraft Company, a former American aerospace contractor founded by Howard Hughes
- Hughes Dynamics, a former American computer firm
- Hughes Electronics, a former electronics business
- Hughes Helicopters, a former helicopter manufacturer
- Hughes Network Systems, a provider of satellite internet services
- Hughes Software Systems, now Aricent
- Hughes Supply, a former wholesaler of construction supplies
- Hughes Systique Corporation, an American provider of R&D services
- Hughes Television Network, a defunct American TV network
- Hughes Tool Company, a former American manufacturer of drill bits

== Education ==
- Hughes Hall, Cambridge, a constituent college of the University of Cambridge, England
- Hughes School District, Hughes, Arkansas, U.S.
- Hughes High School (disambiguation)
- Hughes Middle School (disambiguation)
- Hughes School, near Hamilton, Ohio, U.S.

== Other uses ==
- Hughes (horse), an American thoroughbred racehorse
- Hughes Medal, awarded by the Royal Society of London
- Hughes baronets, two British baronetcies
- USS Hughes (DD-410), a World War II US Navy destroyer
- Hughes Airport (Alaska), Hughes, Alaska, United States
- Hughes Airport (California), a former airport in Los Angeles, California, United States
- Hughes Airfield, in the Northern Territory of Australia

== See also ==
- Fort Hughes (disambiguation)
- Hugh (disambiguation)
- Hughs (disambiguation)
- Hughes breech-loading cannon, used by the Confederacy during the American Civil War
- Hughes House (disambiguation)
- Hughes Manor, near Middletown, Ohio, U.S.
- Hughes Memorial Tower, a radio tower in Washington DC, U.S.
- Hughes Stadium (disambiguation)
- Hugues, a given name
- Mr. Hughes (disambiguation)
