= Hughes House =

Hughes House may refer to the following places in the United States:

- Martin Hughes House, Council Bluffs, Iowa
- David and M. Maria Hughes House, Williamsburg, Iowa
- Elzey Hughes House, Falmouth, Kentucky
- Daniel H. Hughes House, Morganfield, Kentucky
- Hughes House (Benton, Louisiana)
- Hughes House (Elk Rapids, Michigan)
- Hughes–Clark House, Fayette, Mississippi
- J. Willis Hughes House, Jackson, Mississippi
- Langston Hughes House, New York, New York
- J. G. Hughes House, Columbus, North Carolina
- Hughes Manor, Middletown, Ohio
- Dr. Herbert H. Hughes House, Gresham, Oregon
- Patrick Hughes House, Sixes, Oregon
- Hughes House (Jefferson, Pennsylvania)
- Thomas H. Hughes House, Johnston, Rhode Island
- W.J. Hughes Business House, Cleveland, Tennessee
- Wood–Hughes House, Brenham, Texas
- Hughes House, former childhood home of Howard Hughes, now part of the University of St. Thomas campus
- Charles Evans Hughes House, Washington, D.C.
- Hughes-Cunningham House, Hedgesville, West Virginia
