= The Island House =

- Elk Rapids District Library in October 2026

- Location within the state of Michigan
- 44°53′56.6″N 85°24′58.1″W
- Location: 300 Isle of Pines Drive; Elk Rapids, Michigan

History
- Built: 1865 (161 years ago)

Michigan State Historic Site
- Designated: April 24, 1979

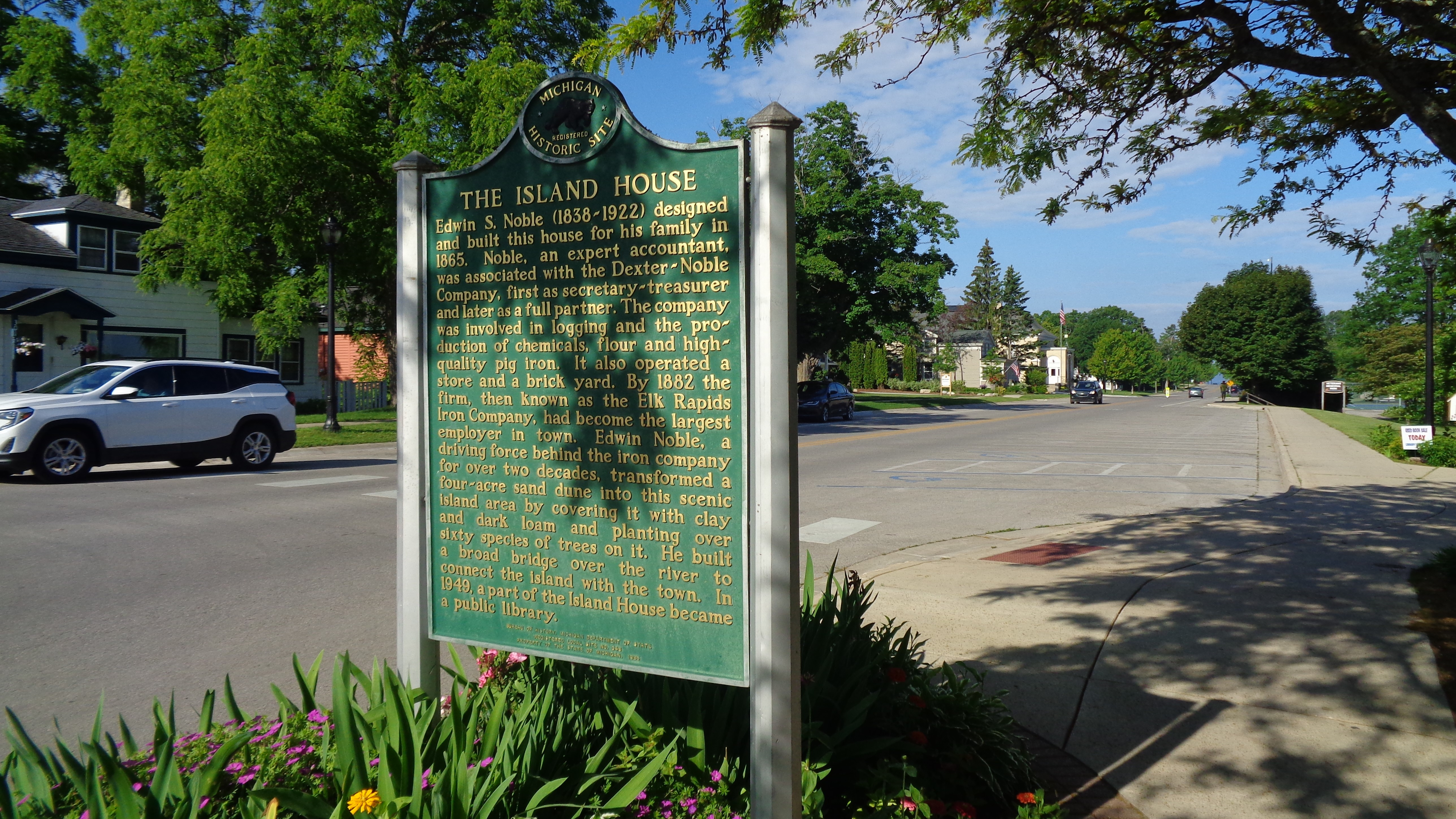
State historic marker along River Street

The Island House, sometimes referred to as the Edwin Noble House or the Elk Rapids Island House, is a historic structure located at 300 Isle of Pines Drive in the village of Elk Rapids in the U.S. state of Michigan. Built in 1865 as a private residence by Edwin S. Noble (1838–1922), it was listed as a Michigan State Historic Site on April 24, 1979. Since 1949, the Island House has served as a public library within the Elk Rapids District Library.

== The island ==
The Island House is centered on an island at the mouth of the Elk River leading to Grand Traverse Bay in Lake Michigan. The island itself has no official name. The Elk River flows for only a short distance at 1.5 miles (2.4 km) from its source at Elk Lake, but in that short distance, the river had numerous rapids through a seven-foot (2.1 m) drop in elevation.

The island encompasses four acres (1.6 ha) and peaks at about 25 feet (7.6 m) above the surface. Edwin Noble radically transformed the island by covering it with clay and loam, as well as planting numerous trees. The island would soon be nicknamed "The Isle of Pines" due to the large number of trees on the island. Noble also constructed a small bridge to connect it to the mainland. The rapids were eliminated when the Elk Rapids Hydroelectric Dam was constructed in 1917, and it remains in operation. Today, the island house and property is owned by the Village of Elk Rapids and is currently occupied by the Elk Rapids District Library.

== History ==
In 1855, the Noble family moved from downstate in Washtenaw County. Henry Noble, along with business partner Wirt Dexter, began purchasing large areas of land in Elk Rapids for their growing company. The Noble-Dexter Company, which was involved primarily in pig iron smelting, became the largest employer in Elk Rapids. The company also expanded into lumbering, chemical production, and flour production. By 1882, the company evolved into the Elk Rapids Iron Company and became one of the largest iron companies in the state.

In 1865, Henry's older brother Edwin moved to Elk Rapids from Dexter to work for the company and eventually gained partial control of the firm. Henry Noble and Wirt Dexter owned the small island, and Edwin wanted to build his home in this prime location. Edwin Noble constructed the small house in 1865, and it underwent numerous additions as Noble's family and wealth expanded. Rooms were added for servants, and the house eventually consisted of four bedrooms, parlor, dining room, and two bathrooms. The island was one of the most expensive and luxurious properties in Elk Rapids and was nicknamed the "Island of Nobility" due to its hosting of lavish parties and lively entertainment.

The swift-moving rapids surrounding the island were perfect for powering numerous sawmills operated by the company, and the main blast furnace was not too far away.

After suffering severe injuries from a boating accident in 1892, Edwin Noble was unable to work and lost controlling interest of the Elk Rapids Iron Company. Forced into financial hardships, he sold the house in 1903 to the new owners of the company from Grand Rapids. The house began to serve as a vacationing home for the company's business associates. When the nearby forests depleted and better smelting processes came about, the Elk Rapids Iron Company became obsolete and closed down around 1918. In 1926, the house became the property of Wirt Dexter's widow Josephine and eventually to their daughter Katharine McCormick, who never actually lived in the house. In 1948, Katharine deeded the island and the house to the Village of Elk Rapids. It was then used as a rental vacation home for meetings and small parties by other residents of Elk Village.

== Elk Rapids District Library ==
Interior images of the library

In 1949, the property was converted for use as a library within the Elk Rapids District Library. The library system is used to serve the residents of the village and the surrounding townships of Elk Rapids, Milton, and Torch Lake.

On April 24, 1979, Elk Rapids received notification that the Island House was selected for inclusion on the state's listing as a Michigan State Historic Site. The building received a plaque, and a historic marker was erected nearby off the island on River Street in 1989. The long-defunct Elk Rapids Iron Company, which today consists of only a small ruin of the original blast furnace near the Island House, was dedicated as a Michigan State Historic Site earlier in 1973.

The Island House is one of four properties on the list of Michigan State Historic Sites in Antrim County, which also includes the Elk Rapids Iron Company Informational Site (ruins of the blast furnace), Elk Rapids Township Hall, and the Hughes House. The latter two are listed also on the National Register of Historic Places, though the Island House is only listed at the state level.

=== Proposed expansion ===
In 2014, the library received a $400,000 donation in a will from local resident Charles Heffer, who requested that it be used to expand and improve the library system. This tremendous donation began the discussion of updating and expanding the Island House Library. Proposals were submitted, and in early 2017, Elk Rapids District Library was granted permission to build a large addition to the Island House Library, which would include the addition of a second floor and nearly double the size of the existing structure—if not completely replace the aging structure and significantly alter the island's scenic environment. Despite the property's historic nature, state historic preservation officials approved the request. Local residents objected to altering the historic structure, and protest signs reading "Preserve Our Island House and Property" began appearing around Elk Rapids. At a village council meeting in November 2017, the council voted 4–3 against the proposed additions to the 151-year-old Island House Library and requested a smaller expansion plan be submitted to appease both sides of the debate. Opponents feared that significant alterations and expansions to the original structure might forfeit the property's historical designation. The library's director, Nannette Miller, supported the proposal and sees it as a way to expand the library's capacity and its usefulness to neighboring communities. Other proponents of the expansion project believe the existing Island House Library is too small to adequately serve the surrounding communities.

In September 2018, the village council of Elk Rapids voted 6–1 to approve the proposal for a 6,300 ft² (583 m²) expansion to the Island House Library. Despite objections from many residents, the estimated $3.2 million project gained the approval of the Michigan State Historic Preservation Office to ensure the property does not lose its historic designation. The expansion project will significantly alter the library but will include numerous restorations to the historical elements of the structure. The project will be funded by donations. As of February 2019, $1 million has been raised. Organizers must collect $3.4 million before construction can begin, and the final cost of the expansion project has been listed at $4.7–5.0 million. Public taxes will not be used for the project, and no precise timeline has been set.
