= Isle of Pines =

Isle of Pines may refer to:

- Isle of Pines, the former name for the Isla de la Juventud, Cuba
- Isle of Pines (island), an island of New Caledonia
- Isle of Pines (commune), the commune including the Isle of Pines
- The Isle of Pines (1668), a book by Henry Neville
- The Island House in Elk Rapids, Michigan (sometimes referred to as the "Isle of Pines")
