= Columbus, North Carolina =

- Town
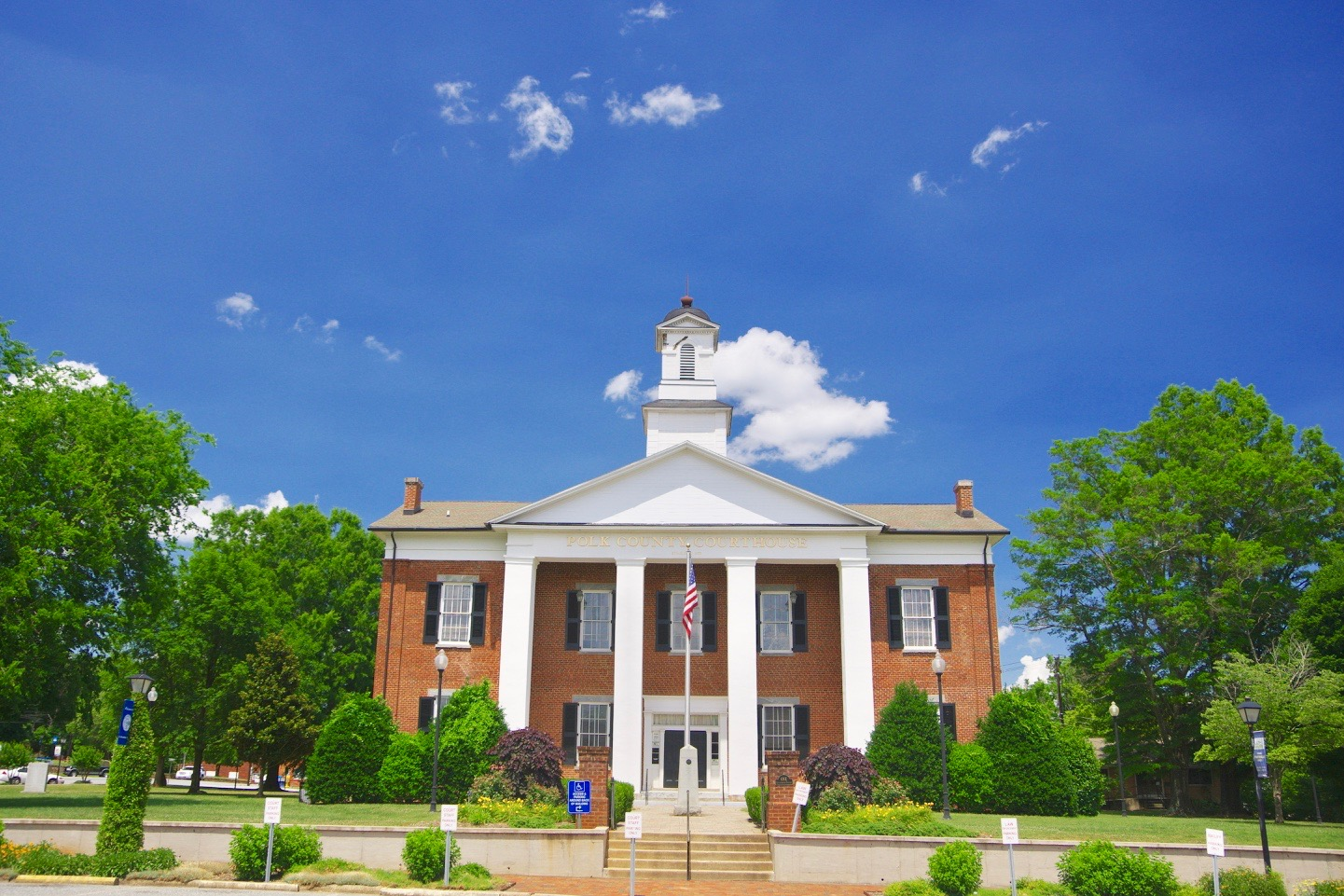
- Polk County Courthouse

- Flag Seal

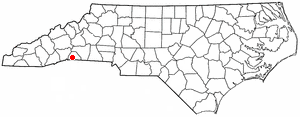
- Location within the state of North Carolina
- Coordinates: 35°14′57″N 82°12′04″W
- Country: United States
- State: North Carolina
- County: Polk

Area
  - Total: 3.77 sq mi (9.76 km^{2})
  - Land: 3.76 sq mi (9.73 km^{2})
  - Water: 0.012 sq mi (0.03 km^{2})
- Elevation: 1,148 ft (350 m)

Population (2020)
  - Total: 1,060
  - Density: 282.2/sq mi (108.94/km^{2})
- Time zone: UTC-5 (Eastern (EST))
  - Summer (DST): UTC-4 (EDT)
- ZIP code: 28722
- Area code: 828
- FIPS code: 37-13980
- GNIS feature ID: 2406301
- Website: www.columbusnc.com

Columbus is a town and the county seat of Polk County, North Carolina, United States. The population was 1,060 at the 2020 census.

== History ==
The Green River Plantation, J. G. Hughes House, and Polk County Courthouse are listed on the National Register of Historic Places.

== Geography ==
The town is concentrated along North Carolina Highway 108, southeast of Asheville, and a few miles north of the North Carolina-South Carolina border. U.S. Route 74 passes through the northern part of town, and Interstate 26 passes through the eastern section.

According to the United States Census Bureau, the town has a total area of 1.8 square miles (4.7 km^{2}), all land.

== Demographics ==
Historical population
Census	Pop.	Note	%±
1880	71		—
1900	334		—
1910	122		−63.5%
1920	168		37.7%
1930	340		102.4%
1940	390		14.7%
1950	486		24.6%
1960	725		49.2%
1970	731		0.8%
1980	727		−0.5%
1990	812		11.7%
2000	992		22.2%
2010	999		0.7%
2020	1,060		6.1%
U.S. Decennial Census

=== 2020 census ===
Columbus racial composition
Race	Number	Percentage
White (non-Hispanic)	842	79.43%
Black or African American (non-Hispanic)	20	1.89%
Native American	4	0.38%
Asian	3	0.28%
Pacific Islander	1	0.09%
Other/Mixed	59	5.57%
Hispanic or Latino	131	12.36%

As of the 2020 United States census, there were 1,060 people, 491 households, and 292 families residing in the town.

=== 2000 census ===
As of the census of 2000, there were 992 people, 414 households, and 238 families residing in the town. The population density was 559.1 inhabitants per square mile (215.9/km^{2}). There were 442 housing units at an average density of 249.1 per square mile (96.2/km^{2}). The racial makeup of the town was 90.32% White, 5.95% African American, 0.20% Native American, 3.12% from other races, and 0.40% from two or more races. Hispanic or Latino of any race were 7.56% of the population.

There were 414 households, out of which 19.8% had children under the age of 18 living with them, 44.7% were married couples living together, 10.4% had a female householder with no husband present, and 42.5% were non-families. 38.6% of all households were made up of individuals, and 26.8% had someone living alone who was 65 years of age or older. The average household size was 2.08 and the average family size was 2.75.

The population was spread out, with 17.5% under the age of 18, 5.0% from 18 to 24, 21.1% from 25 to 44, 17.6% from 45 to 64, and 38.7% who were 65 years of age or older. The median age was 52 years. For every 100 females, there were 86.1 males. For every 100 females age 18 and over, there were 79.4 males.

The median income for a household was $25,469, and the median income for a family was $38,542. Males had a median income of $30,000 versus $19,000 for females. The per capita income for the town was $15,587. About 9.3% of families and 15.8% of the population were below the poverty line, including 18.7% of those under age 18 and 13.8% of those age 65 or over.

== Healthcare ==
AdventHealth Polk is the only hospital.
