= Polk County Courthouse (North Carolina) =

Historic courthouse in North Carolina, US

- U.S. National Register of Historic Places
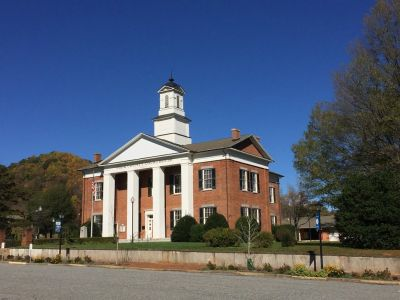
- Polk County Courthouse in 2015

- Location within North Carolina Location within the United States
- Location: 1 Courthouse St., Columbus, North Carolina
- Coordinates: 35°15′5″N 82°11′54″W
- Area: 1 acre (0.40 ha)
- Built: 1859
- Built by: Ephraim Clayton, George W. Shakelford
- Architectural style: Greek Revival
- NRHP reference No.: 74001371
- Added to NRHP: November 8, 1974

Polk County Courthouse is a historic courthouse located in Columbus, Polk County, North Carolina. It was built in 1859 and is a two-story, T-shaped, Greek Revival-style brick building. The front facade features an engaged, three-bay portico with a plain pediment supported by four square pillars. Atop the roof is a three-stage cupola.

It was added to the National Register of Historic Places in 1974.
