= AdventHealth Polk =

Non-profit hospital in Columbus, North Carolina, U.S.

- AdventHealth

Geography
- Location: 101 Hospital Drive, Columbus, North Carolina
- Coordinates: 35.2398°N 82.2128°W

Organisation
- Care system: Private hospital
- Type: General hospital
- Religious affiliation: Seventh-day Adventist Church

Services
- Beds: 25

Helipads
- Helipad: Aeronautical chart and airport information for 9NC5 at SkyVector

History
- Former name: St. Luke's Hospital
- Constructed: 1970
- Opened: November 8, 1929 and April 16, 1972

Links
- Website: www.adventhealth.com/hospital/adventhealth-polk

St. Luke's Hospital, Inc. (doing business as AdventHealth Polk) is a non-profit hospital in Columbus, North Carolina, United States, managed by AdventHealth. It is designated a critical access hospital.

== History ==
In 1916, the Tryon Infirmary was founded by physicians Allen J. Jervey and Marion C. Palmer, in a boarding house that they rented. One of their patients donated $10,000 to have a hospital built. Local donors from Tryon, North Carolina gave another $57,000 and also The Duke Endowment gave $40,000. Jersey donated the land where a 24-bed hospital was built with a stone façade. On November 8, 1929, St. Luke's Hospital opened with eleven employees.

The hospital expanded in 1954 and 1959, increasing the number of beds to 50. By the 1960s, St. Luke's Hospital could not be added onto anymore. A $1.5 million bond was announced to residents for the construction of a new hospital. Advertisements were put in newspapers, both for and against a new hospital. On February 16, 1968, residents voted in favor of having a new hospital built on North Carolina Highway 108 by Columbus, North Carolina on 25 acres (10 ha) that was donated by the St. Luke's Auxiliary.

In the spring of 1970, there was a groundbreaking for the new hospital. On April 16, 1972, St. Luke's Hospital opened at its new location.

After St. Luke's hospital moved, the former property was given to Polk County and was renamed the Jervey-Palmer building. It was used by the county for offices, including its social services department, a senior center and also for veteran's services.

In 2008, St. Luke's Hospital and Atrium Health signed a partnership agreement. In 2020, Atrium Health told the hospital that it would not be renewing their partnership. This then forced the board of directors to start looking for a new partner for the hospital. They did not want to sell it or have a partner turn it into an urgent care.

On August 19, 2024, AdventHealth announced that it would be taking over the management of St. Luke's Hospital. AdventHealth had signed an agreement to lease the hospital from Polk County for 20 years. A new board will be created: two from St. Luke's board of directors, two from the community and five chosen by AdventHealth. On October 1, AdventHealth took over the management of St. Luke's Hospital, even thou they thought about delaying due to Hurricane Helene. In the end they chose to proceed and the hospital was rebranded to AdventHealth Polk.

== Services ==
In September 2006, St. Luke's Hospital became only the second medical facility in North Carolina to purchase the PROfx operating table, it was purchased for $150,000 for hip replacement surgery.

== See also ==
- List of Seventh-day Adventist hospitals
