= Elk Rapids Township, Michigan =

- Civil township
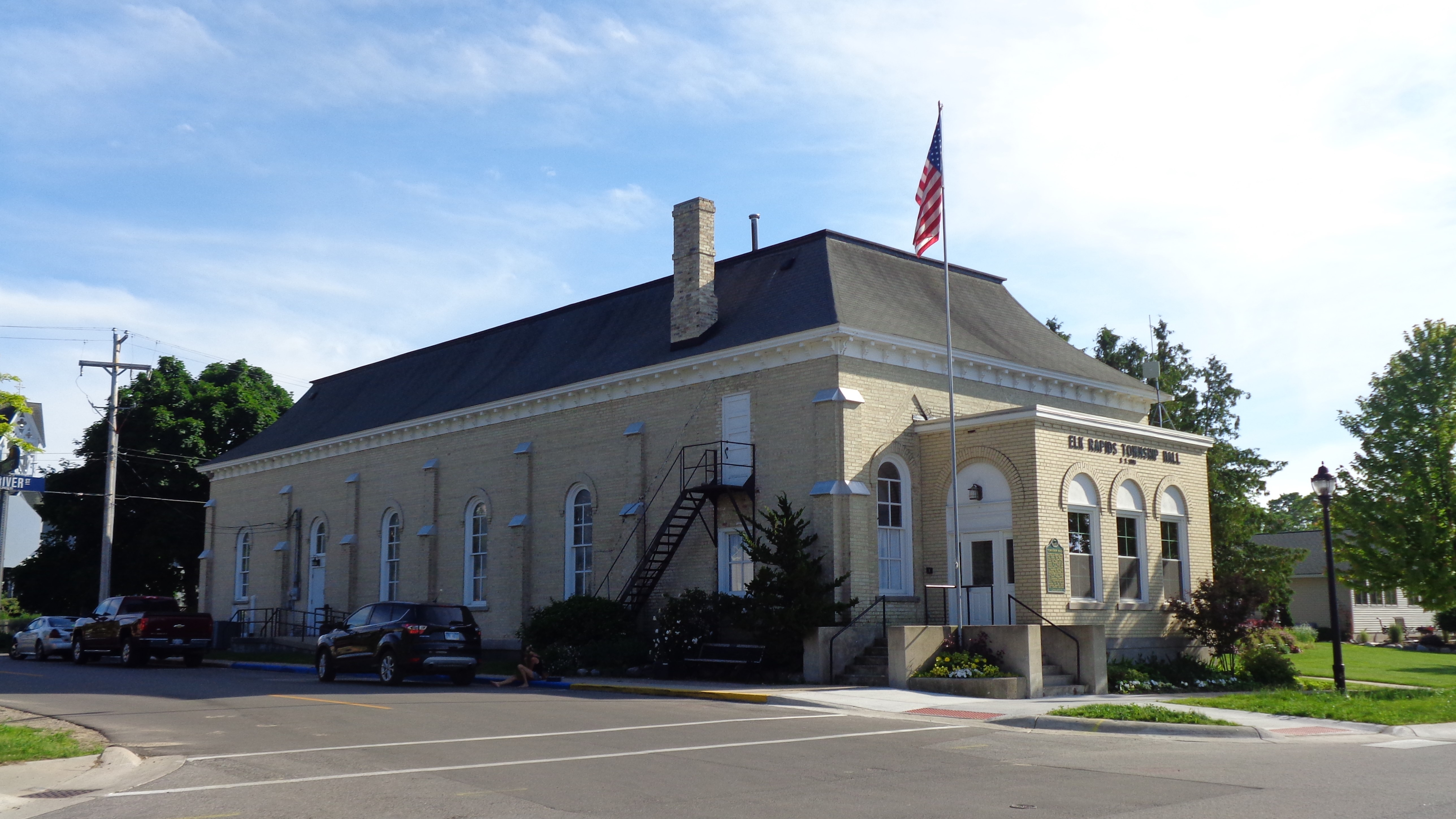
- Township Hall in the village of Elk Rapids

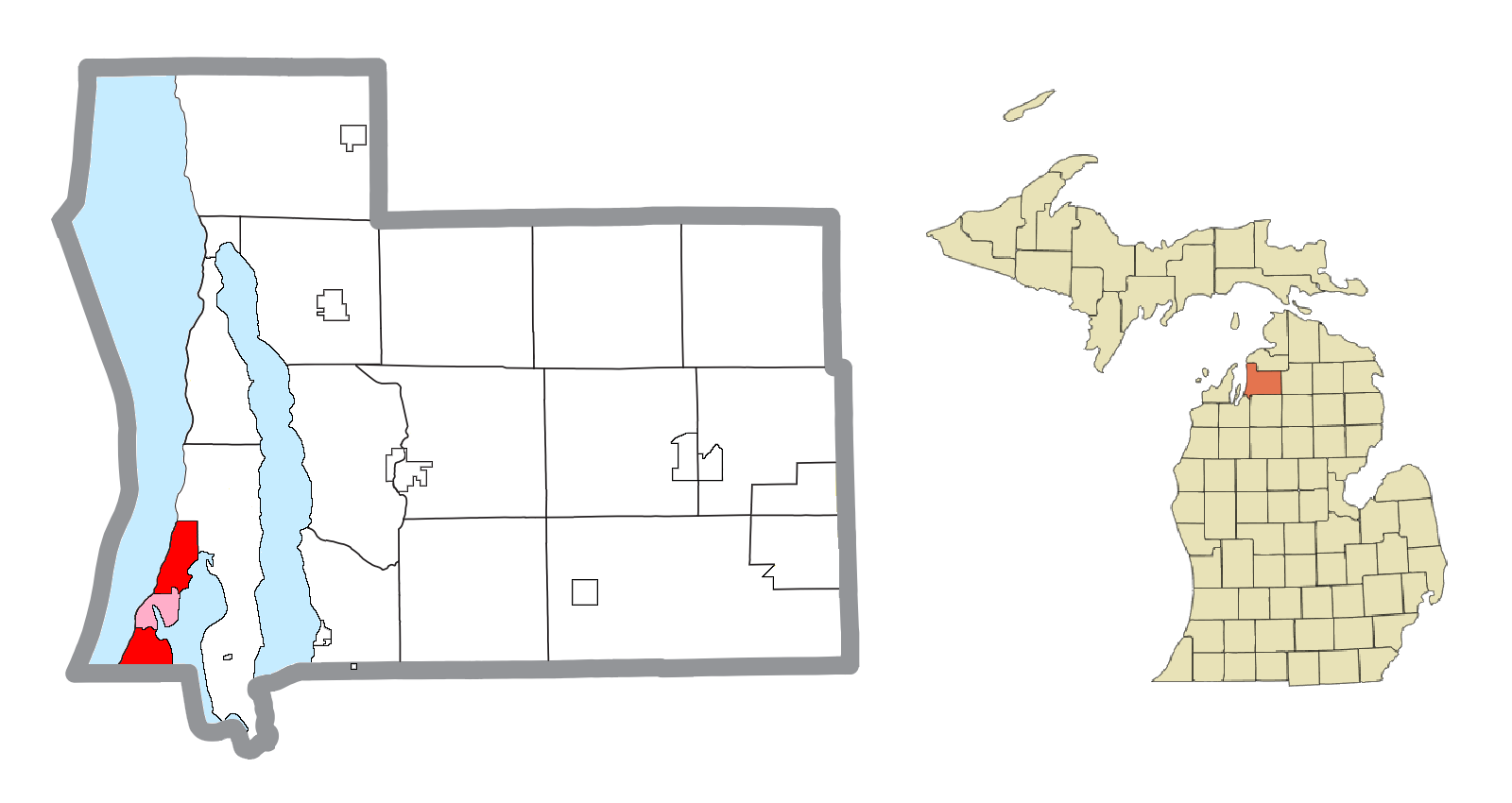
- Location within Antrim County (red) and the administered village of Elk Rapids (pink)

- Location within the state of Michigan Elk Rapids Township (the United States)
- Coordinates: 44°54′04″N 85°24′15″W
- Country: United States
- State: Michigan
- County: Antrim

Government
  - Supervisor: Dorance Amos
  - Clerk: Shelley Boisvert

Area
  - Total: 11.0 sq mi (28.4 km^{2})
  - Land: 7.1 sq mi (18.3 km^{2})
  - Water: 3.9 sq mi (10.1 km^{2})
- Elevation: 614 ft (187 m)

Population (2020)
  - Total: 2,521
  - Density: 370.6/sq mi (143.1/km^{2})
- Time zone: UTC-5 (Eastern (EST))
  - Summer (DST): UTC-4 (EDT)
- ZIP code(s): 49629 (Elk Rapids)
- Area code: 231
- FIPS code: 26-25340
- GNIS feature ID: 1626227
- Website: Official website

Elk Rapids Township is a civil township of Antrim County in the U.S. state of Michigan. The population was 2,521 at the 2020 census. The village of Elk Rapids is located within the township.

== Geography ==
According to the United States Census Bureau, the township has a total area of 11.0 square miles (28.4 km^{2}), of which 7.1 square miles (18.3 km^{2}) is land and 3.9 square miles (10.1 km^{2}), or 35.41%, is water.

== Demographics ==
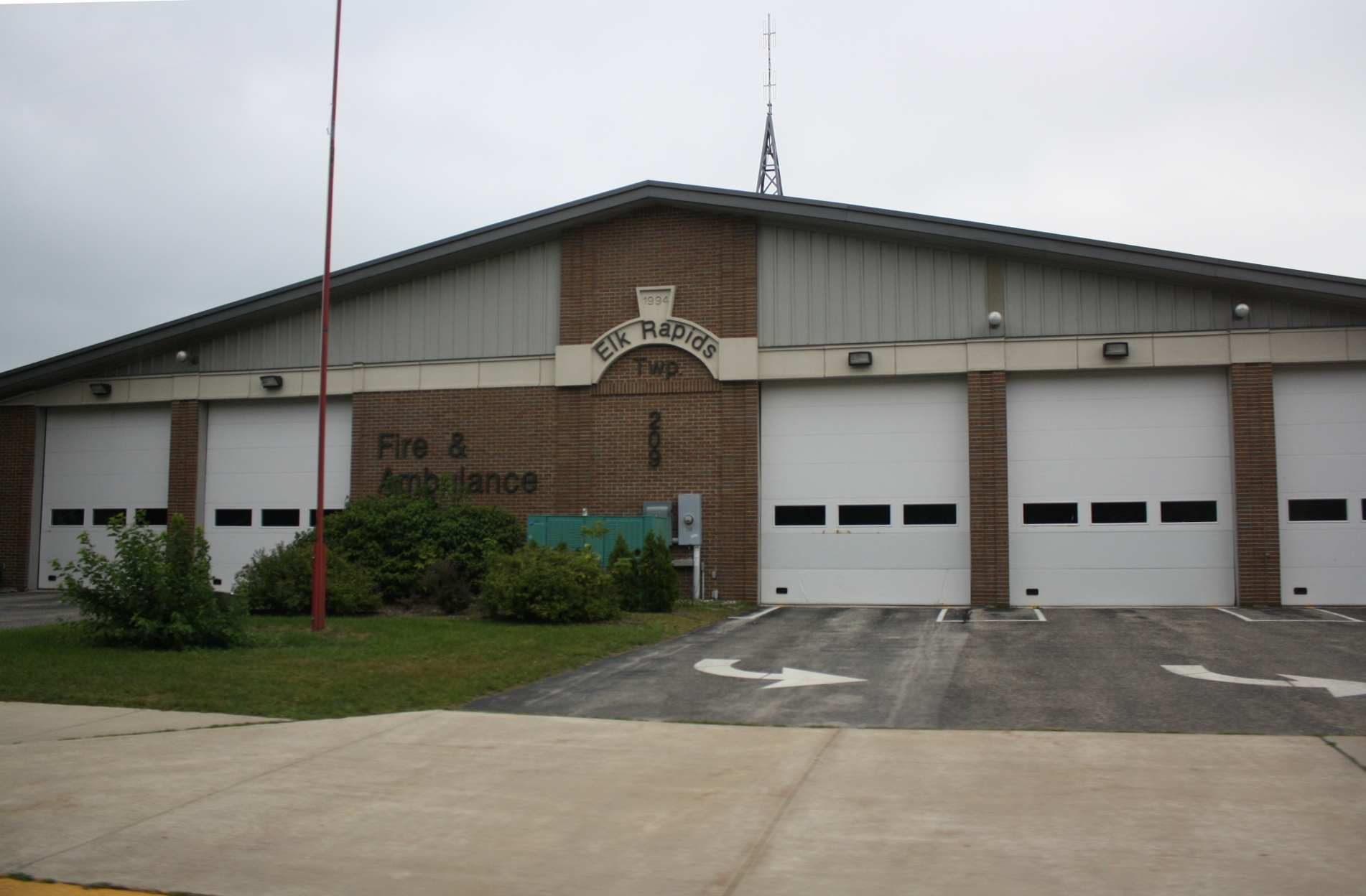
Elk Rapids Township Fire and Ambulance

As of the census of 2000, there were 2,741 people, 1,206 households, and 811 families residing in the township. The population density was 385.3 inhabitants per square mile (148.8/km^{2}). There were 1,763 housing units at an average density of 247.8 per square mile (95.7/km^{2}). The racial makeup of the township was 97.67% White, 0.22% African American, 0.80% Native American, 0.26% Asian, 0.15% Pacific Islander, 0.40% from other races, and 0.51% from two or more races. Hispanic or Latino of any race were 1.90% of the population.

There were 1,206 households, out of which 26.2% had children under the age of 18 living with them, 56.1% were married couples living together, 9.1% had a female householder with no husband present, and 32.7% were non-families. 29.2% of all households were made up of individuals, and 15.5% had someone living alone who was 65 years of age or older. The average household size was 2.26 and the average family size was 2.78.

In the township the population was spread out, with 22.1% under the age of 18, 5.2% from 18 to 24, 21.9% from 25 to 44, 28.9% from 45 to 64, and 21.9% who were 65 years of age or older. The median age was 45 years. For every 100 females, there were 98.6 males. For every 100 females age 18 and over, there were 88.8 males.

The median income for a household in the township was $36,250, and the median income for a family was $48,450. Males had a median income of $32,386 versus $23,403 for females. The per capita income for the township was $21,970. About 5.8% of families and 7.6% of the population were below the poverty line, including 9.6% of those under age 18 and 9.0% of those age 65 or over.

== In fiction ==
The cabin in the woods from the Evil Dead franchise - named Knowby Cabin by one of its owners - is located just outside Elk Rapids Township.
