= Mr. Hughes (disambiguation) =

Mr. Hughes is a ring name of Curtis Hughes (born 1964), an American professional wrestler.

Mr. Hughes may also refer to:

- "Mr. Hughes", a 2015 song by Demi Lovato from the deluxe edition of Confident
- A coded reference to George Harrison in Rick Nelson's song "Garden Party"

== See also ==
- Hughes (disambiguation)
