= Hughes High School (disambiguation) =

Hughes High School may refer to:

- Hughes High School, Hughes, Arkansas, U.S.
- Langston Hughes High School, Fairborn, Georgia, U.S.
- Hughes STEM High School, Cincinnati, Ohio, U.S.

== See also ==
- Hughes Springs High School
- Hughes School, a historic school building near Hamilton, Ohio, U.S.
