= Elk Rapids Township Hall =

- U.S. National Register of Historic Places
- Michigan State Historic Site
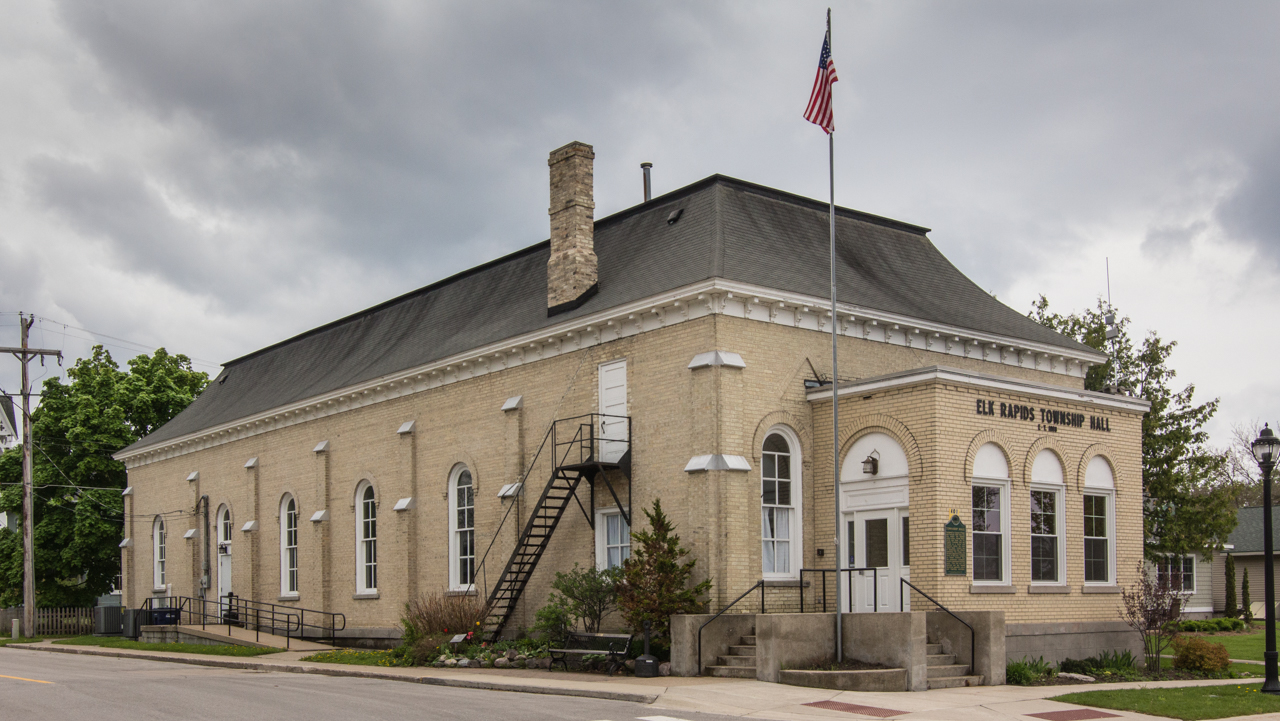
- Township Hall

- Location within Michigan Location within the United States
- Interactive map
- Location: 401 River Street; Elk Rapids, Michigan
- Coordinates: 44°53′51″N 85°24′57″W
- Area: 0.3 acres (0.12 ha)
- Built: 1883
- Architect: Charles Peale
- NRHP reference No.: 77000709

Significant dates
- Added to NRHP: September 22, 1977
- Designated MSHS: November 15, 1973

The Elk Rapids Township Hall is a former government building located on River Street in Elk Rapids, Michigan. It was designated a Michigan State Historic Site in 1973 and listed on the National Register of Historic Places in 1977. The building was refurbished, and as of 2020, the building served as a rental space and performance venue known as HERTH Hall (for Historic Elk Rapids Township Hall).

== History ==
The site of the Township Hall is near the location that Abram Wadsworth, the first white settler in the area, lived. By the 1880s, Elk Rapids was a prosperous community that needed a permanent meeting place. The Township Hall was constructed in 1883 from a design by local architect Charles Peale. From the beginning, it was designed to serve both governmental and social functions, housing the town government and containing performance space. The hall hosted plays and vaudeville performances, and in the 1940s it was used as a school gymnasium and auditorium.

In the 1950s, demolition of the Township Hall was discussed, but voted down. In 1967, demolition was again discussed, but by 1972, the decision had been made to restore it. In 1974, the Elk Rapids Area Historical Society formed and began a restoration program. In 2004, the township office moved out of the building. In 2009, the Historic Elk Rapids Town Hall Association (HERTHA) was formed to operate and maintain the building. It serves as a performance space and is available for rental.

== Description ==
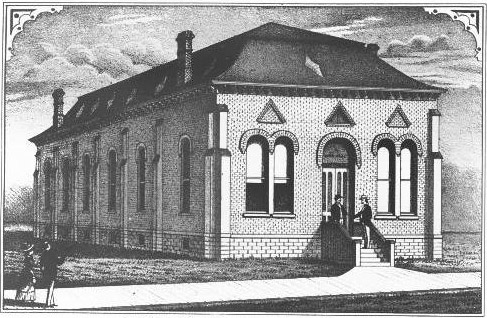
Town Hall, 1884

The Elk Rapids Township Hall is a rectangular, single-story structure, constructed of buff-colored brick with a mansard roof. It measures approximately 38 feet (12 m) by 100 feet (30 m), topped by a mansard roof. The entrance is reached through a modern rectangular vestibule addition. The side walls have round-arch windows with stepped buttress piers. Inside, the main hall seats approximately 180 guests, with the stage retaining its early twentieth-century valley scene.

After extensive renovation, HERTH Hall is a venue available to rent for wedding events, reunions, concerts, parties and more.
