= Hughes House (Elk Rapids, Michigan) =

Historic house in Michigan, United States

- U.S. National Register of Historic Places
- Michigan State Historic Site
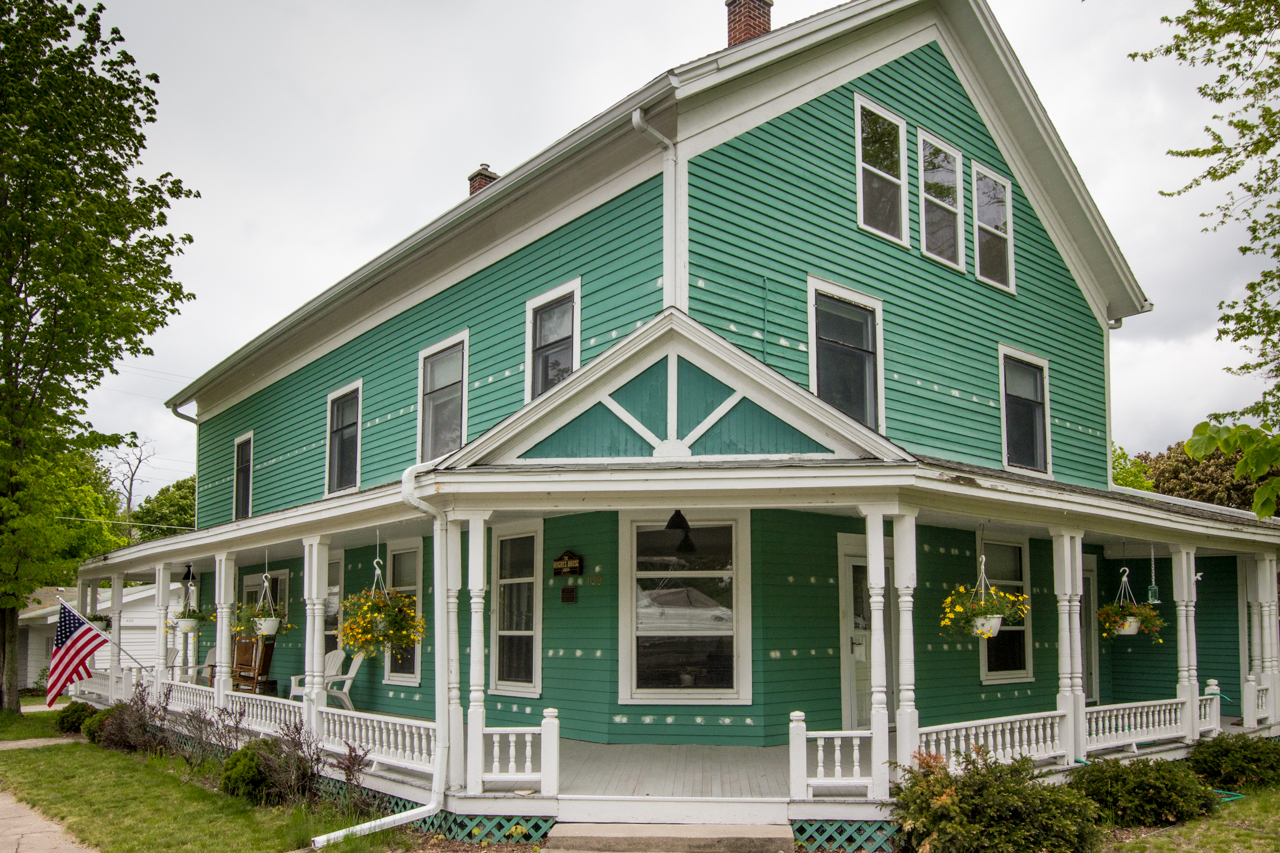

- Location within Michigan Location within the United States
- Interactive map
- Location: 109 Elm St., Elk Rapids, Michigan
- Coordinates: 44°53′49″N 85°25′4″W
- Area: less than one acre
- Built: 1867
- NRHP reference No.: 76001024

Significant dates
- Added to NRHP: May 6, 1976
- Designated MSHS: October 21, 1975

The Hughes House is a house located at 109 Elm Street in Elk Rapids, Michigan. It was built in 1867 as a guest house for travelers going through Elk Rapids via stagecoach or steamboat. It was designated a Michigan State Historic Site in 1975 and listed on the National Register of Historic Places in 1976. It is a well-preserved example of popular vernacular architecture.

== History ==
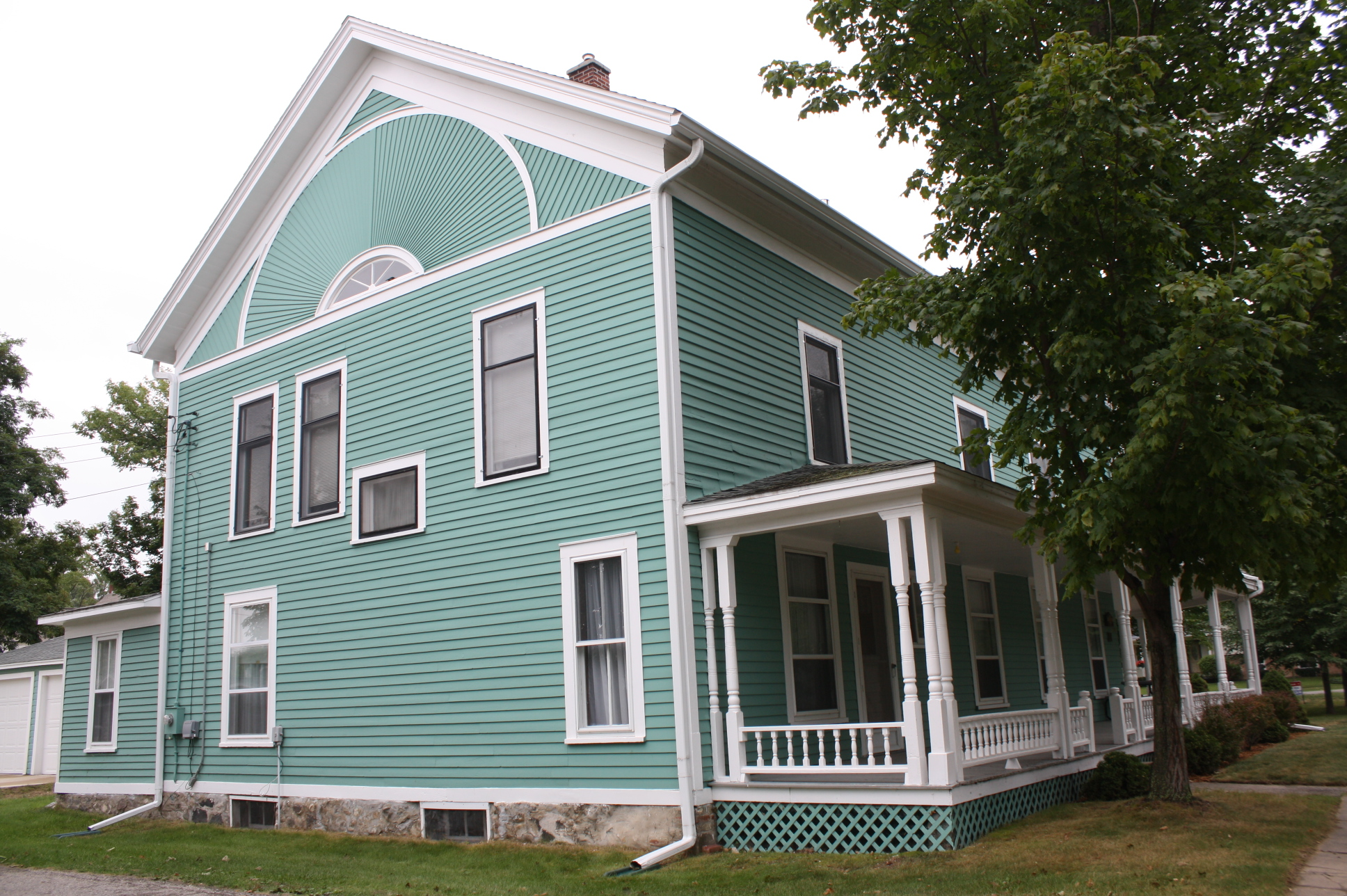
Hughes House in 2011

The Hughes House was constructed in approximately 1867 by a local carpenter as a guest house, located on the stagecoach road between Traverse City and Petoskey. In 1877, it was purchased by settlers John and Martha Hughes. They operated it until 1898, when their daughter, Alice Hughes Butler, inherited the house. She added the veranda and remodeled the interior into a family dwelling. Alice Hughes Butler lived in the house for many years, and her daughter, Josephine Butler Cary, continued living there until at least 1980. Josephine Cary's daughter Barbary Cary and her husband William H. Coburn inherited the house. The House was most recently purchased in July 2014 by Matthew and Anne Conrad of Elk Rapids as their permanent residence. Recent improvements include foundation re-support and insulation of the exterior walls.

== Description ==
The Hughes House is a rectangular 2 1/2-story frame house with a gable roof and clapboard siding on a fieldstone foundation. It has a wrap-around veranda decorated with stickwork and turned spindles. This interior has over 3500 square feet of space, with seven bedrooms, 2 1/2 baths, and a kitchen, dining room, and family room on each floor.
