= David and M. Maria Hughes House =

Historic house in Iowa, United States

- U.S. National Register of Historic Places
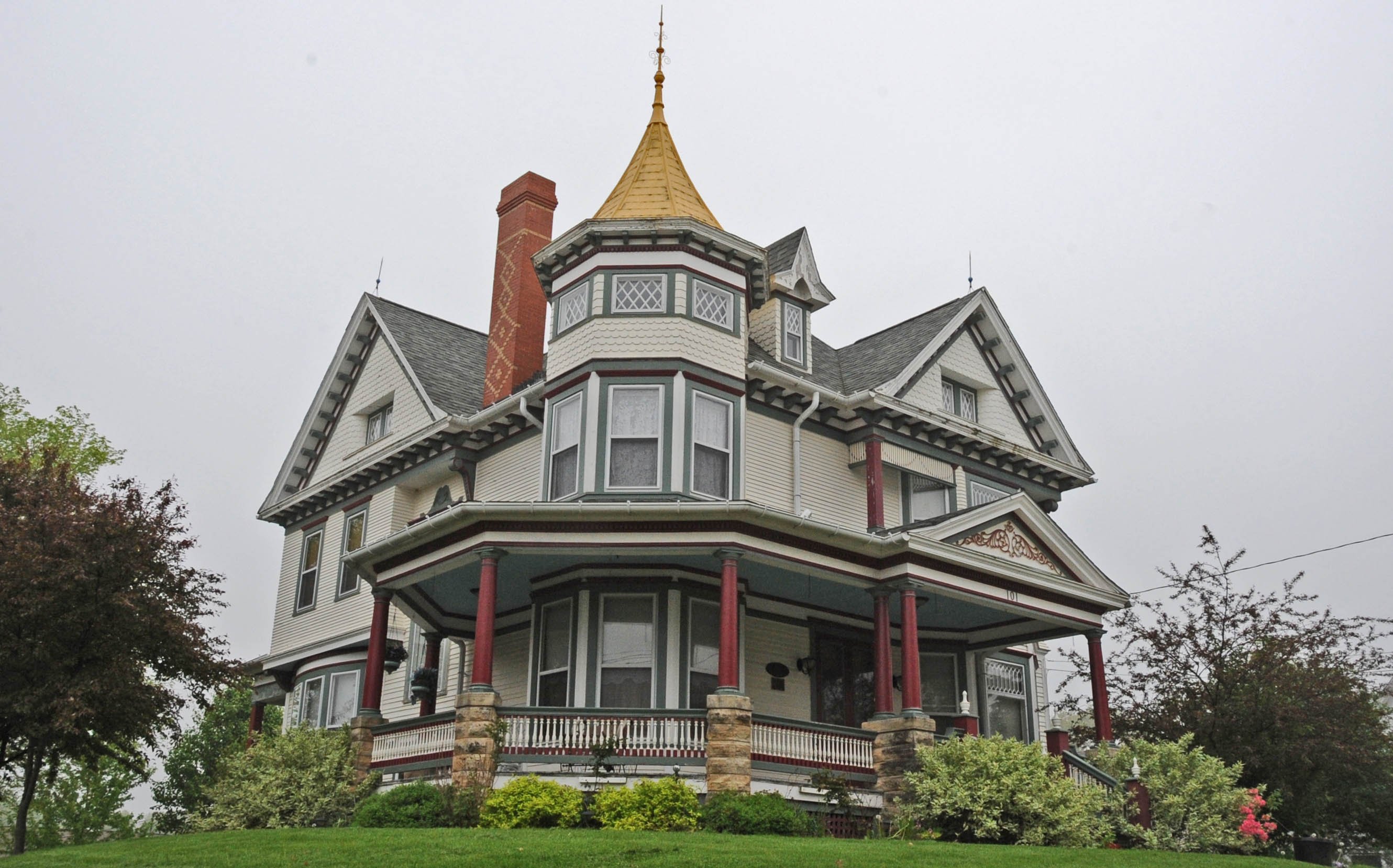

- Location within Iowa Location within the United States
- Location: 101 W. Penn St. Williamsburg, Iowa
- Coordinates: 41°39′34″N 92°0′28″W
- Built: 1901
- Built by: Will Long
- Architect: Dieman and Fiske
- Architectural style: Queen Anne
- NRHP reference No.: 96000697
- Added to NRHP: June 28, 1996

The David and M. Maria Hughes House is a historic building located in Williamsburg, Iowa, United States. David Hughes, a Williamsburg native, was serving as Iowa County Superintendent of Schools and deputy clerk of court when he established the Iowa Lumber Company. The company was renamed Hughes and Brother Lumber when his brother John joined the business. The brothers became wealthy as the result of a building boom in town after the arrival of the Chicago, Milwaukee, and St. Paul Railroad in 1884. David's wife M. Maria (Morse) Hughes was a school teacher. Because of poor eyesight, Hughes retired the year the house was completed, and he sold his share of the business to his brother. He and his wife relocated to their other home in Long Beach, California in 1906, where they owned a considerable amount of real estate. The house remained a single-family dwelling until 1951 when it was divided into three apartments. Starting in the 1980s three separate owners have worked to return the house to its original floor plan.

The Cedar Rapids, Iowa architectural firm of Dieman and Fiske designed the Hughes' house, and it was constructed by local builder Will Long. The 2 1/2-story frame structure is a free classic Queen Anne house built on a limestone foundation. It features a wraparound porch, a hipped roof with a front dormer and cross gables, and a corner tower with a finial. The house was listed on the National Register of Historic Places in 1996.
