= Fort Hughes (disambiguation) =

Fort Hughes may refer to:

- Fort Hughes, Caballo Island, Philippines
- Fort Hughes (Georgia)
- Fort Hughes (Nova Scotia)
