= Hughes breech-loading cannon =

- Type: Field gun
- Place of origin: Confederate States of America

Service history
- In service: 1862–1865
- Used by: Confederate States of America
- Wars: American Civil War

Production history
- Designed: 1861
- Manufacturer: Street & Hungerford Company
- Produced: 1861

Specifications
- Barrel length: 120.65 cm
- Caliber: 38.1 mm
- Breech: Strikerless turning bolt
- Carriage: Box trail

The Hughes breech-loading cannon 38.1mm gun was designed in 1861 and used by the Confederate States of America during the American Civil War. It was manufactured by the Street & Hungerford Company. It was a breech-loading cannon; the breech of the cannon is uniquely like a bolt-action but has no firing pin in its bolt.

== See also ==
- Rifled breech loader
