= Daniel H. Hughes House =

- U.S. National Register of Historic Places
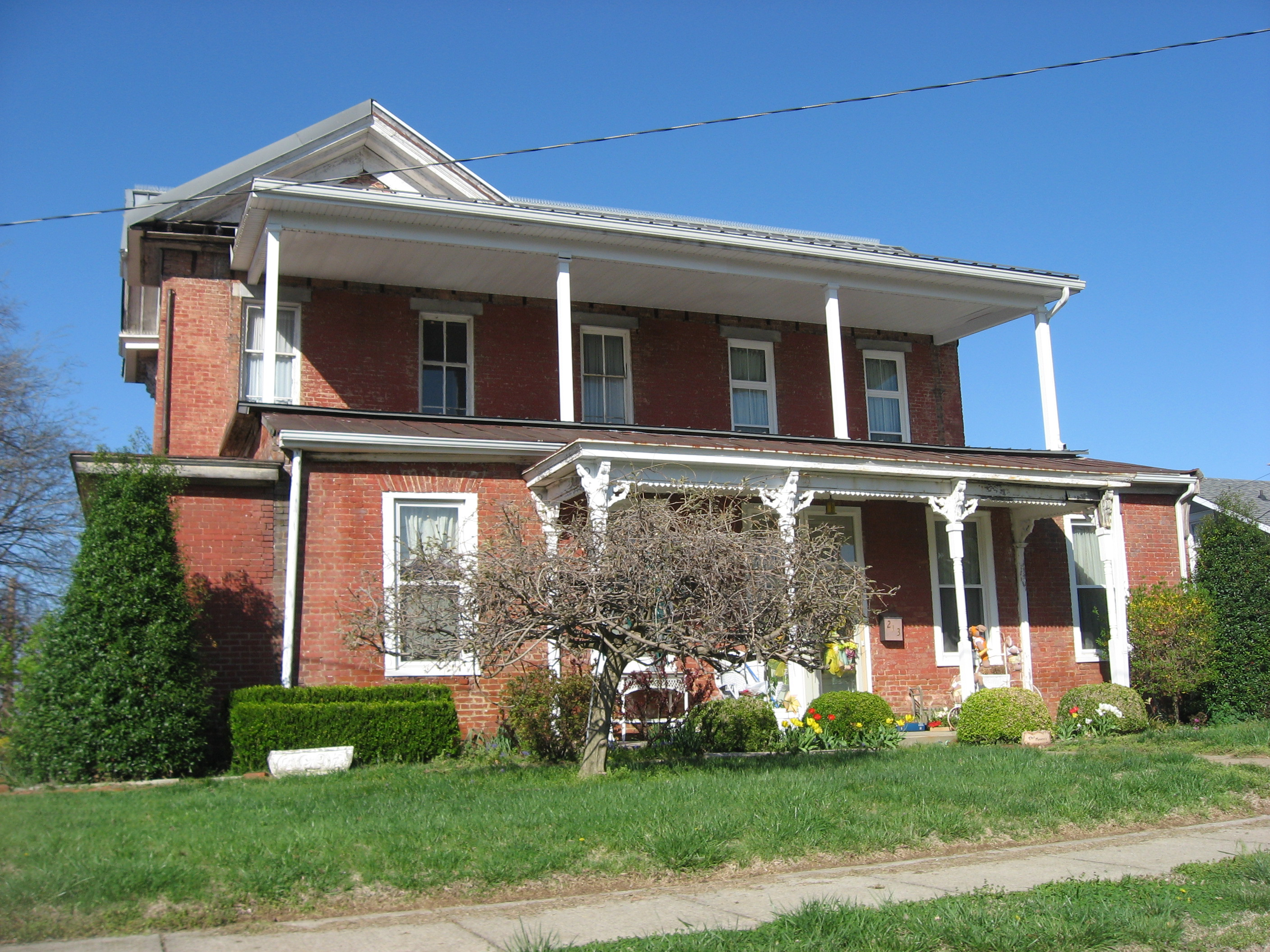

- Location within Kentucky Location within the United States
- Location: 213 W. O'Bannon St., Morganfield, Kentucky
- Coordinates: 37°41′01″N 87°55′07″W
- Area: less than one acre
- Architectural style: Italianate
- NRHP reference No.: 80001673
- Added to NRHP: May 27, 1980

The Daniel H. Hughes House, at 213 W. O'Bannon St. in Morganfield, Kentucky, is a historic house which was listed on the National Register of Historic Places in 1980.

Its front section is a two-story, brick, Italianate-style T-plan house, which has a projecting facade with a semi-octagonal one-story bay. It has various Italianate details. This section was added onto an earlier structure, from the early 1800s, which is a one-story, Federal-style house.
