= J. G. Hughes House =

Historic house in North Carolina, United States

- U.S. National Register of Historic Places
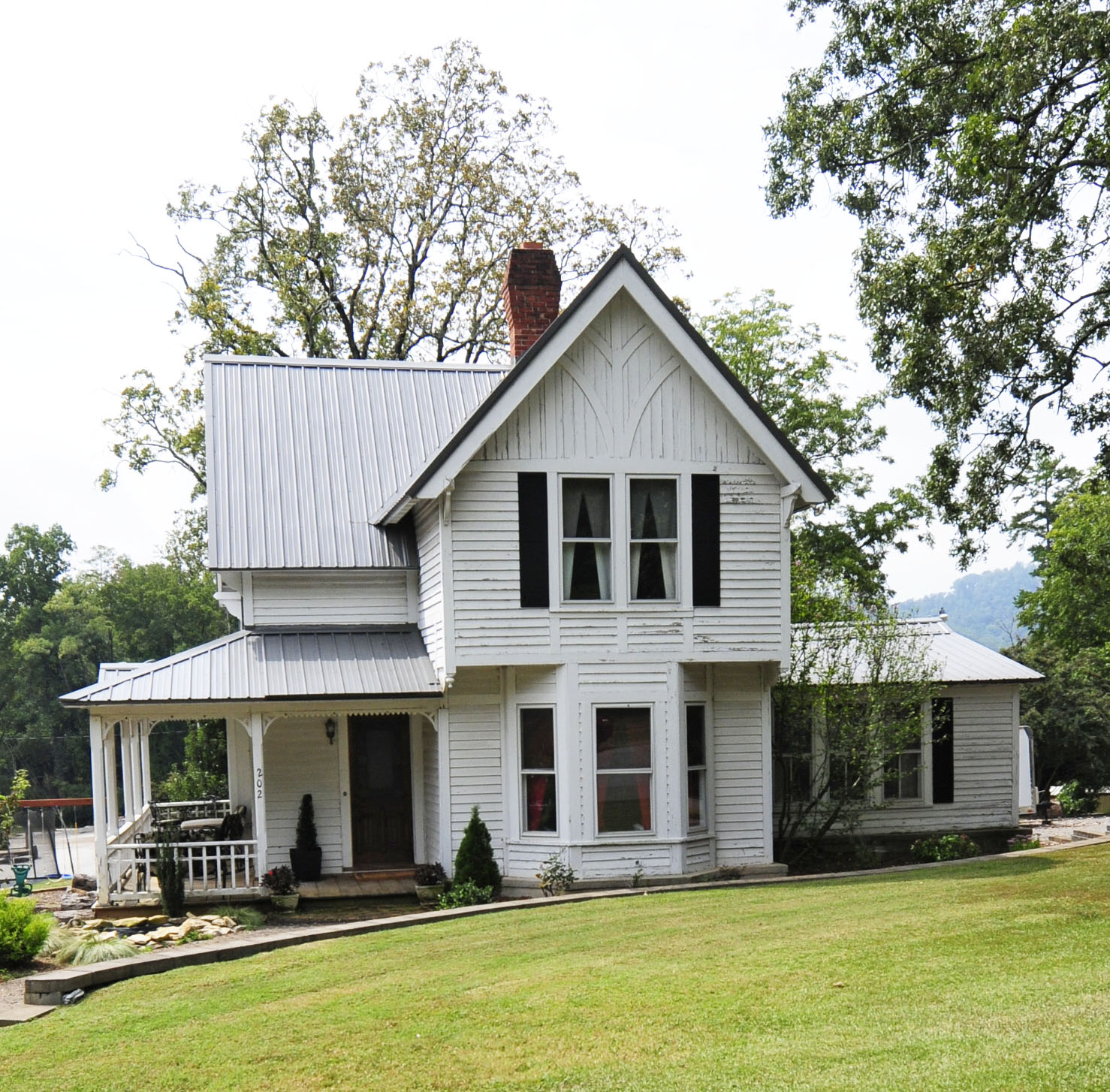
- J G Hughes House, September 2012

- Location within North Carolina Location within the United States
- Location: N. Peak St., Columbus, North Carolina
- Coordinates: 35°15′14″N 82°11′59″W
- Area: 1.9 acres (0.77 ha)
- Built: 1896
- Architectural style: Queen Anne
- NRHP reference No.: 89000347
- Added to NRHP: May 5, 1989

J. G. Hughes House, also known as Fieldstone, is a historic home located at Columbus, Polk County, North Carolina. It was built in 1896, and is a two-story, four-bay, Queen Anne style frame dwelling. It has a cross gable roof, is sheathed in weatherboard, and rests on a stone foundation. It features a wrapround porch with sawn brackets and a cutaway bay window.

It was added to the National Register of Historic Places in 1989.
