= Hughes Stadium =

Hughes Stadium may refer to:

- Sonny Lubick Field at Hughes Stadium in Fort Collins, Colorado, U.S.
- Charles C. Hughes Stadium in Sacramento, California, U.S.
- Hughes Stadium (Morgan State), on the campus of Morgan State University, Baltimore, Maryland, U.S.
- Fred G. Hughes Stadium, on the campus of Missouri Southern State University, Joplin, Missouri, U.S.
