= Martin Hughes House =

Historic house in Iowa, United States

- U.S. National Register of Historic Places
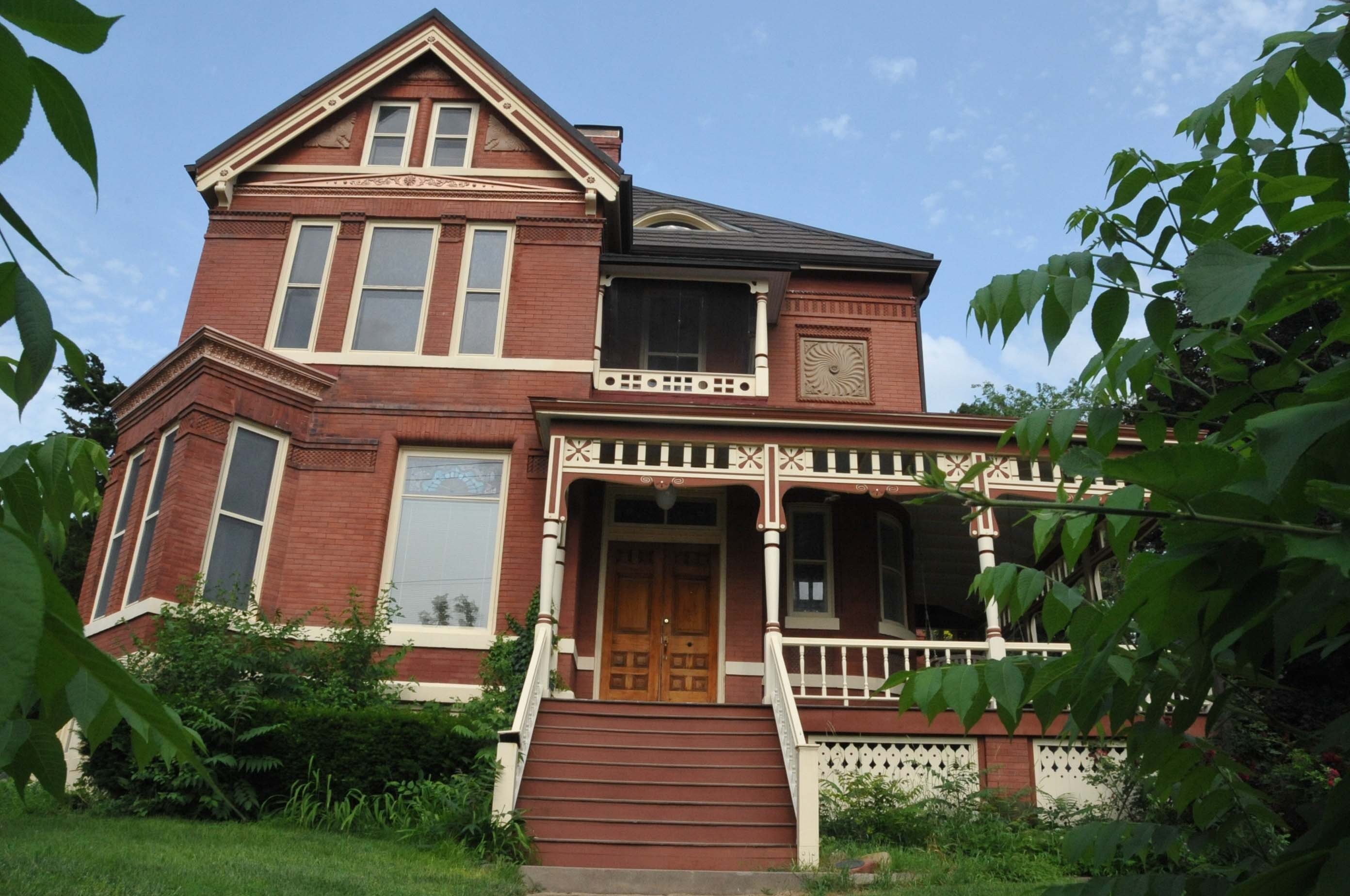

- Location within Iowa Location within the United States
- Location: 903 3rd St. Council Bluffs, Iowa
- Coordinates: 41°15′11.3″N 95°50′53.5″W
- Area: less than one acre
- Built: 1887-1888
- Architect: S.E. Maxon
- Architectural style: Gothic Revival; Queen Anne
- NRHP reference No.: 84001310
- Added to NRHP: September 27, 1984

The Martin Hughes House is a historic building located in Council Bluffs, Iowa, United States. It is an eclectic combination of Gothic Revival and Queen Anne architectural elements, with influences from the Neoclassical and the Stick styles. The two-story brick structure follows an irregular plan, and features decorative art glass, terra cotta decorative elements, and a wrap-around porch. It was designed by local architect S.E. Maxon. Hughes settled in Council Bluffs in 1856 and worked as a contractor before he operated a brickyard. He also owned large parcels of land in both urban and rural areas. The house was listed on the National Register of Historic Places in 1984.

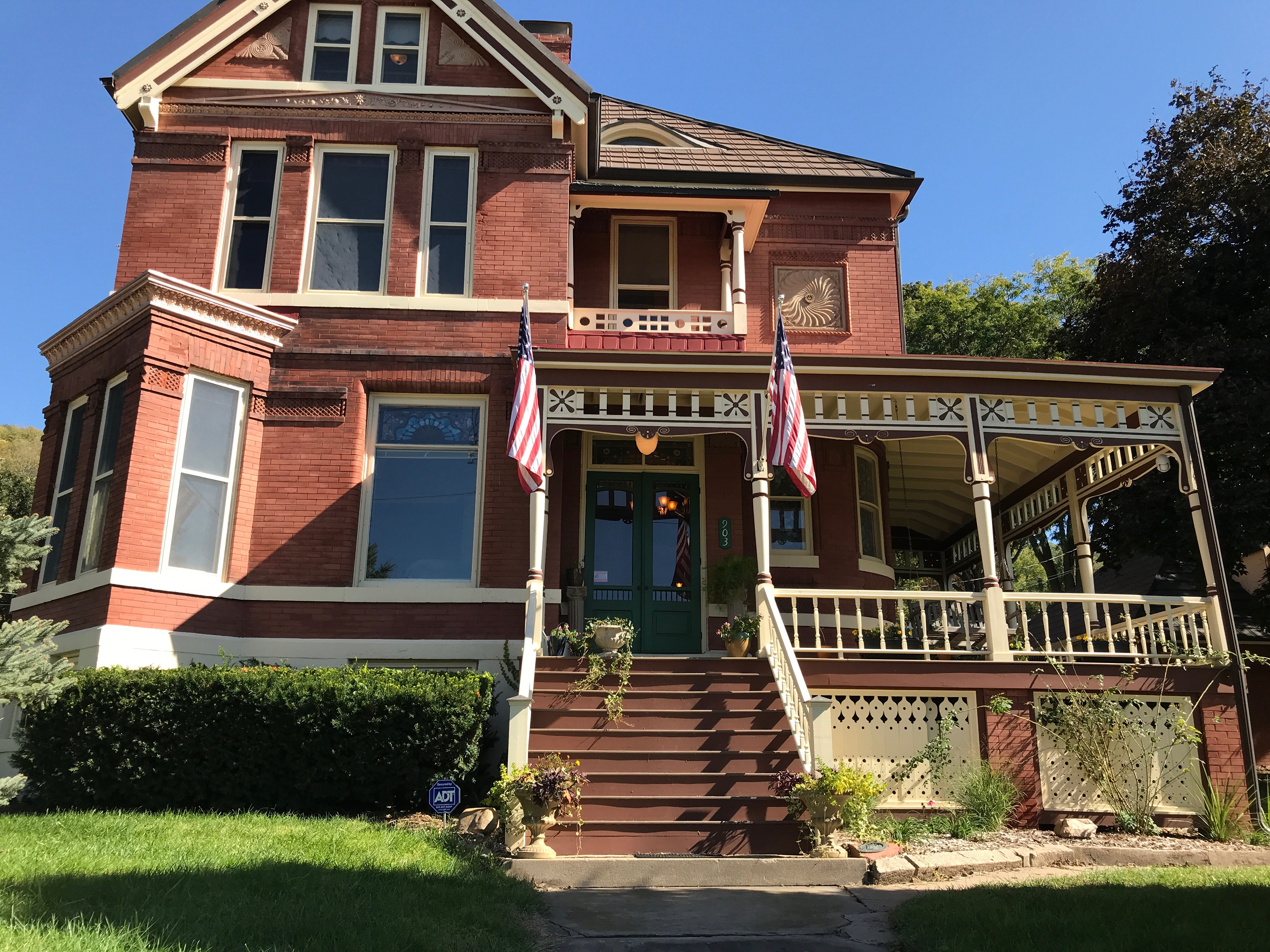
Exterior

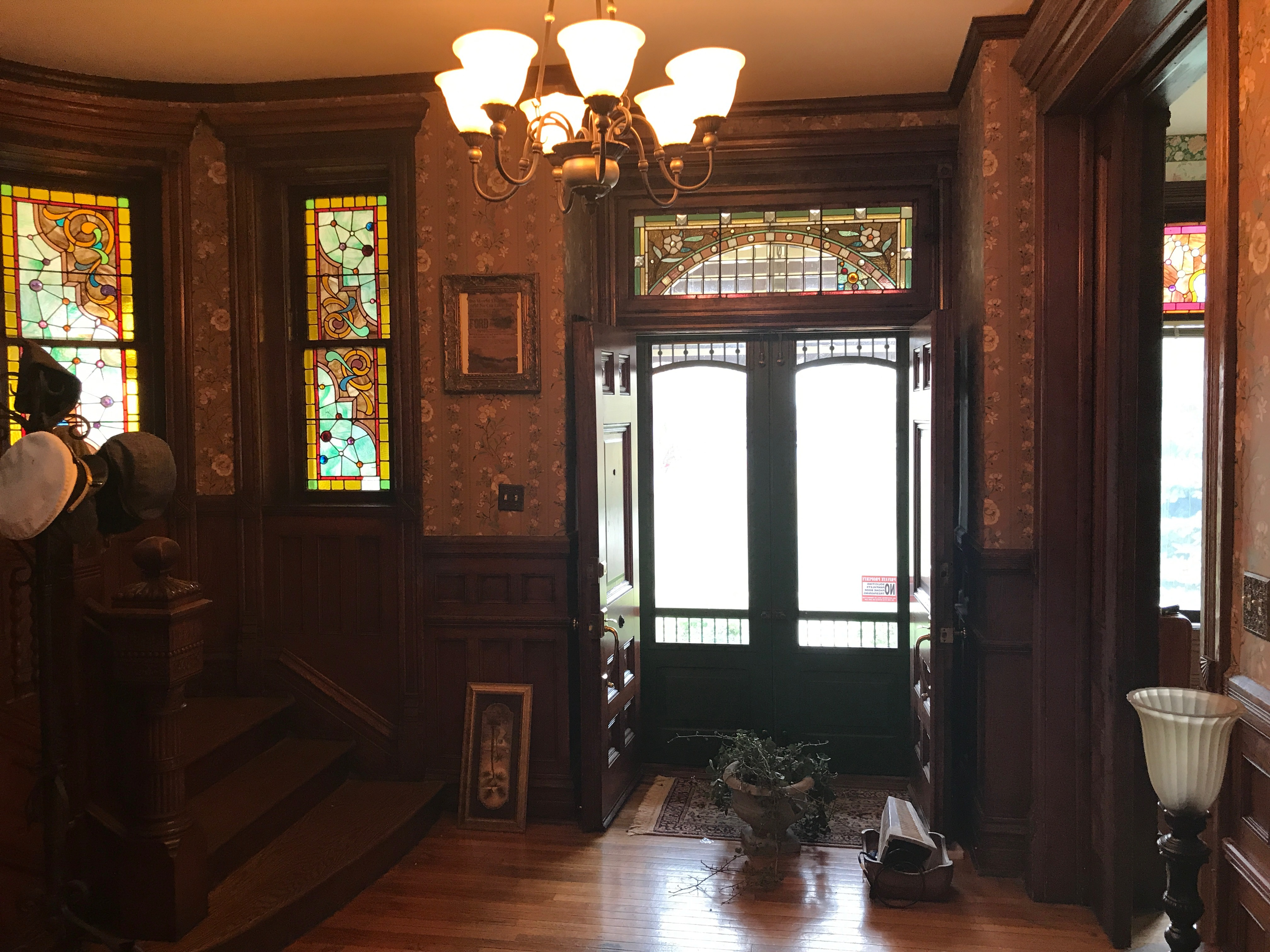
Main entry

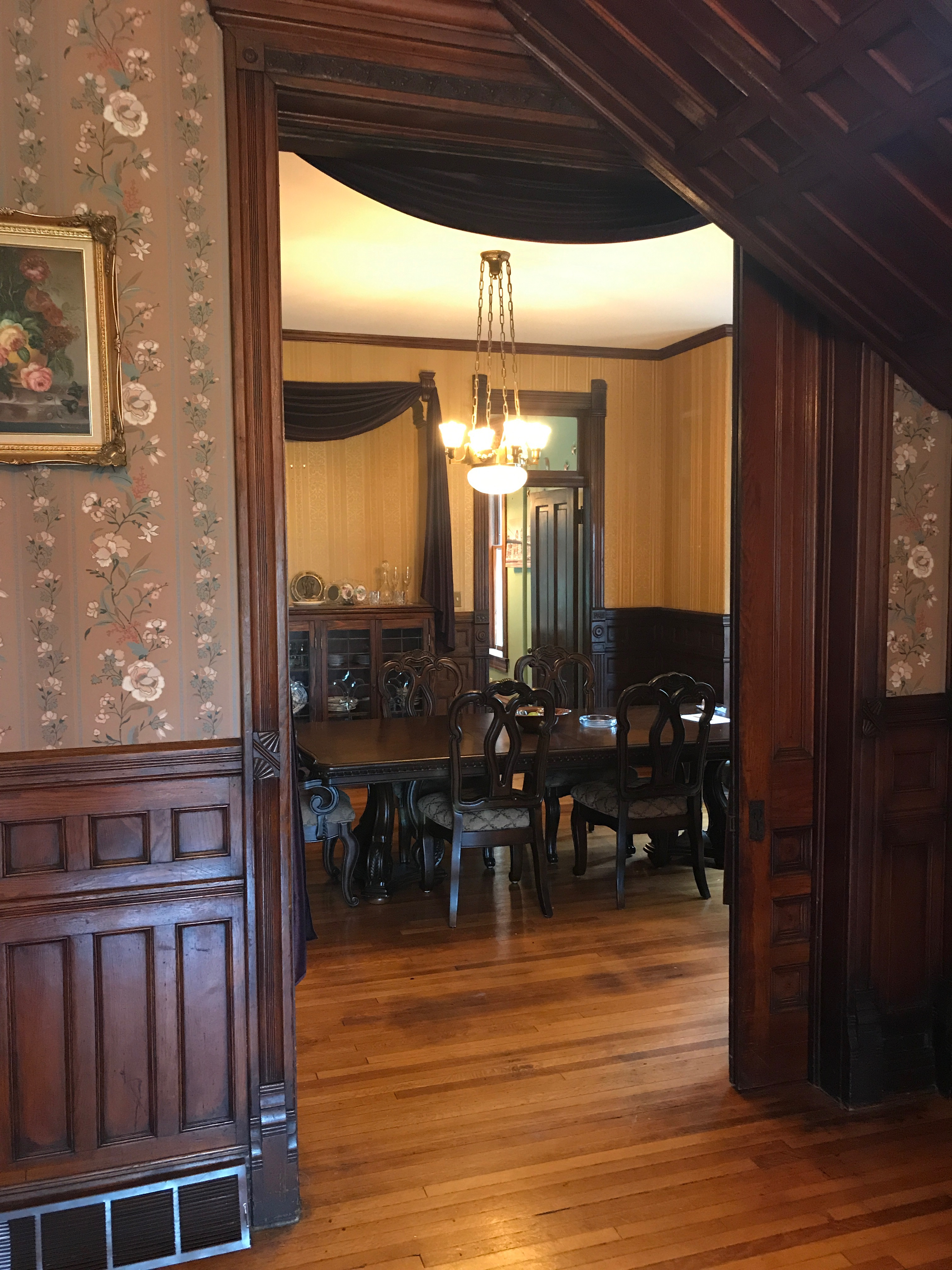
Dining room
