= Hughes Manor =

Historic house in Ohio, United States

- U.S. National Register of Historic Places
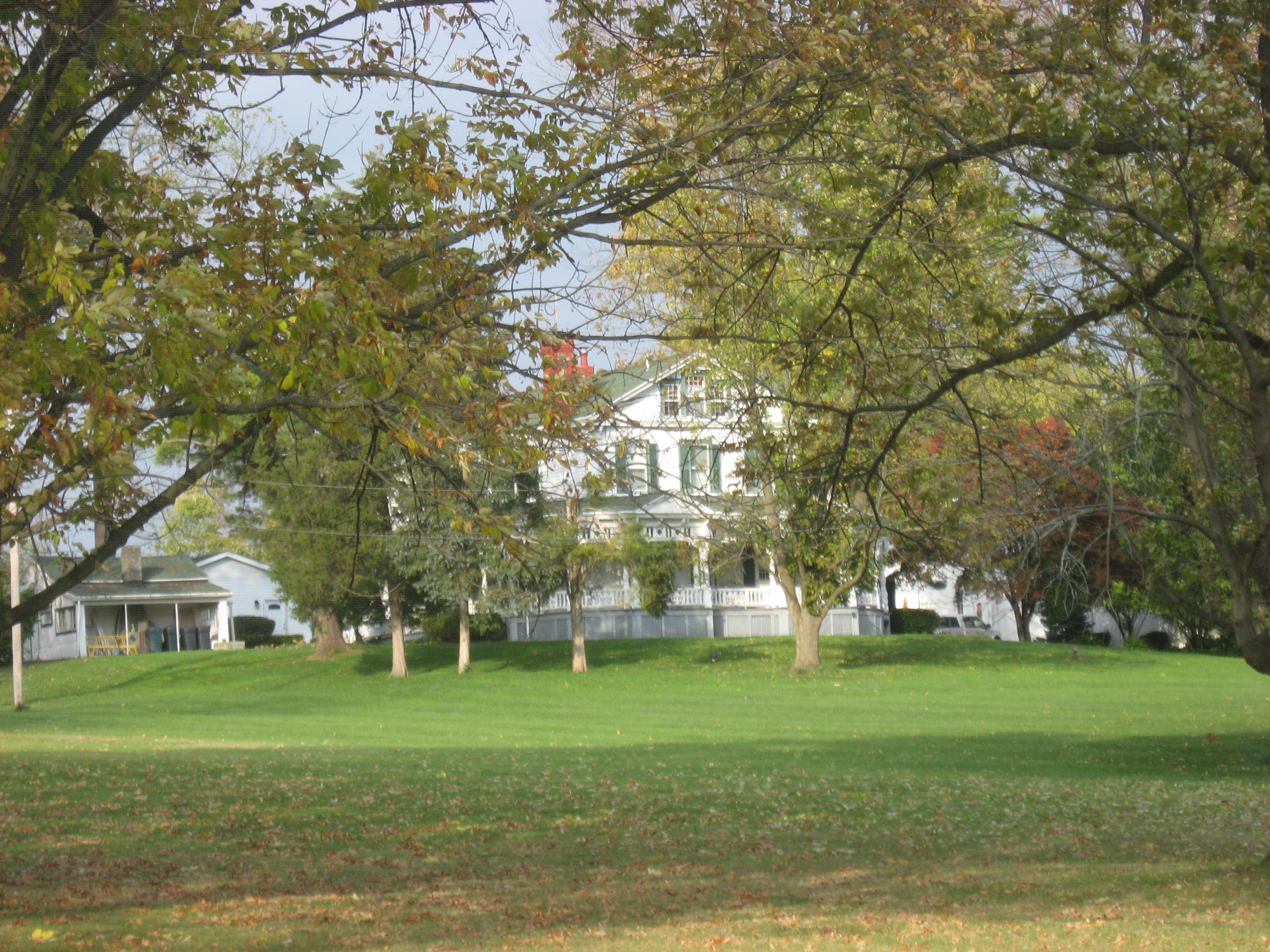
- Distant view of the farmhouse and other buildings

- Location within Ohio Location within the United States
- Nearest city: Middletown, Ohio
- Coordinates: 39°26′50″N 84°25′4″W
- Area: 10.5 acres (4.2 ha)
- Built: 1889
- Architectural style: Greek Revival, Stick/Eastlake, Queen Anne
- NRHP reference No.: 94000242
- Added to NRHP: March 17, 1994

Hughes Manor, also known as White House Manor, located near Middletown, Ohio, was built in 1889. It was listed on the National Register of Historic Places in 1994.

It was listed on the NRHP for its architecture. It includes Greek Revival, Stick/Eastlake, and Queen Anne architecture.

The 10.5-acre (4.2 ha) listed area included 5 contributing buildings and one contributing structure. Historic functions served by its buildings include serving as a single dwelling, as a secondary structure, and as agricultural outbuildings.
