= Elk Rapids, Michigan =

- Village
- Village of Elk Rapids
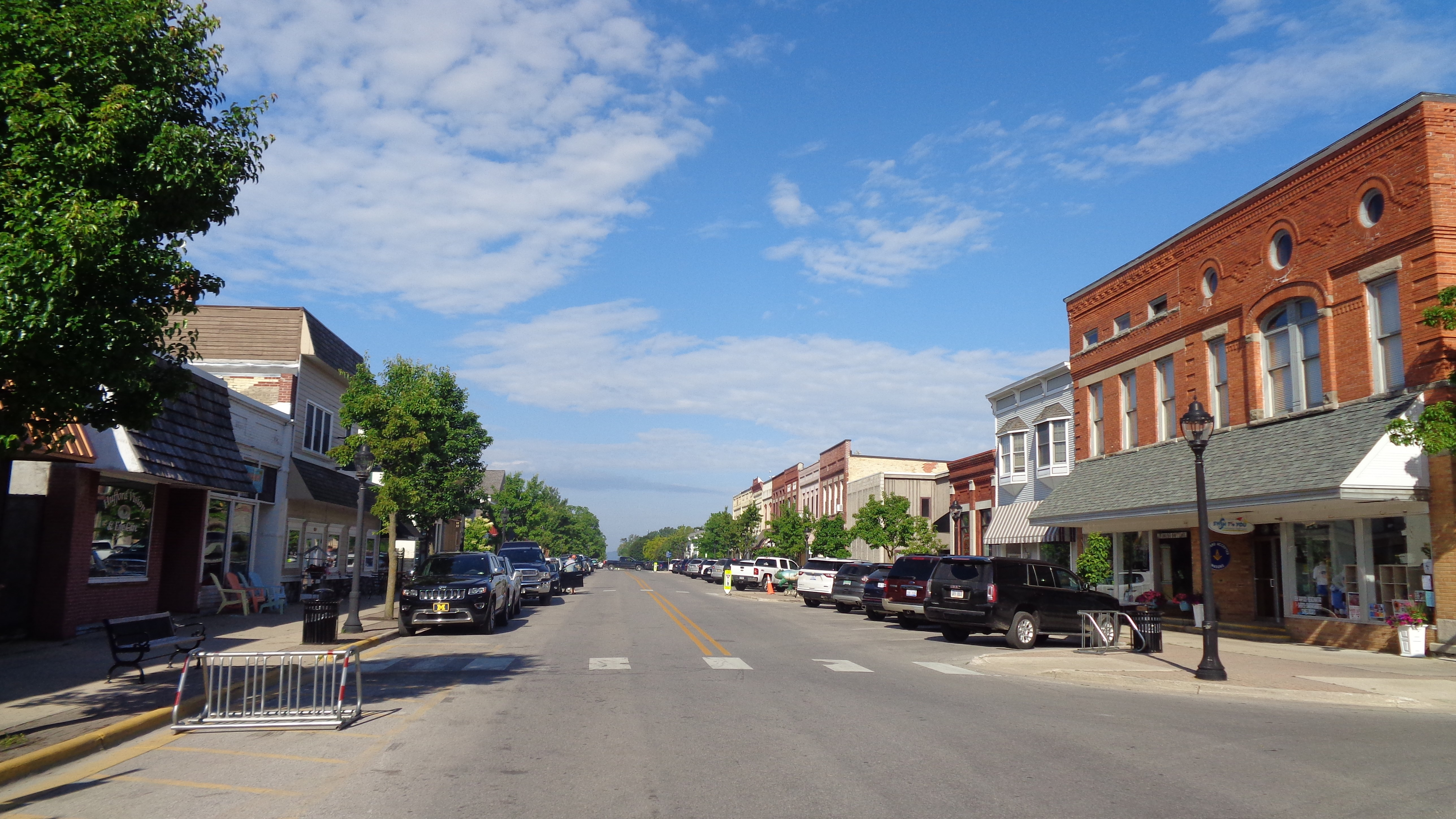
- Downtown Elk Rapids along River Street

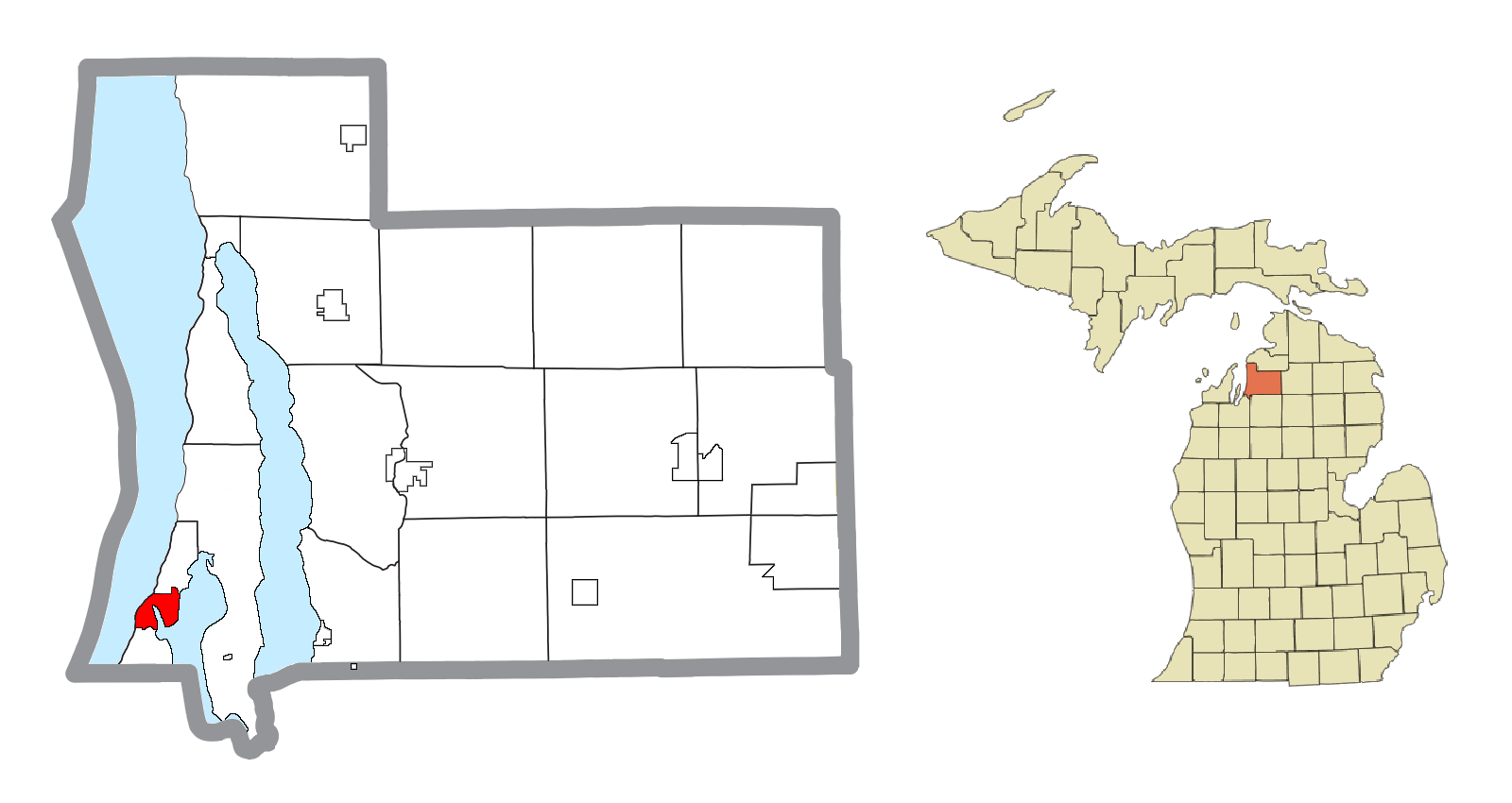
- Location within Antrim County

- Location within the state of Michigan
- Coordinates: 44°53′49″N 85°24′38″W
- Country: United States
- State: Michigan
- County: Antrim
- Township: Elk Rapids
- Platted: 1852
- Incorporated: 1900

Government
  - Type: Village council
  - President: Thomas Stephenson
  - Clerk: Leah Moskovitz

Area
  - Total: 2.01 sq mi (5.20 km^{2})
  - Land: 1.65 sq mi (4.27 km^{2})
  - Water: 0.36 sq mi (0.93 km^{2})
- Elevation: 597 ft (182 m)

Population (2020)
  - Total: 1,529
  - Density: 926.4/sq mi (357.68/km^{2})
- Time zone: UTC-5 (Eastern (EST))
  - Summer (DST): UTC-4 (EDT)
- ZIP code(s): 49629
- Area code: 231
- FIPS code: 26-25320
- GNIS feature ID: 0625459
- Website: www.elkrapids.org

Elk Rapids is a village in the U.S. state of Michigan. The village is the largest incorporated community in Antrim County, with a population of 1,529 at the 2020 census. The village is located within Elk Rapids Township, in the southwest of Antrim County, and is on the shore of Grand Traverse Bay, a bay of Lake Michigan. Elk Rapids is located about 12 miles (19 km) southwest of Bellaire, the county seat, and about 13 miles (21 km) northeast of Traverse City, the largest city in Northern Michigan.

== History ==
The first settler in the Elk Rapids area was Abram S. Wadsworth, from Connecticut. Wadsworth platted the area in 1852, calling it Stevens. A post office opened in 1854. In 1858, Wadsworth renamed the area to Elk Rapids, after finding a pair of elk antlers near the mouth of the later-named Elk River. In 1863, Antrim County was organized, and Elk Rapids was made the county seat. However, the seat was moved to the more centrally located Bellaire in 1879. In 1892, Elk Rapids became a station on a spur of the Chicago and West Michigan Railway. The town was incorporated as a village in 1900.

== Geography ==
According to the United States Census Bureau, the village has a total area of 2.01 square miles (5.21 km^{2}), of which 1.65 square miles (4.27 km^{2}) is land and 0.36 square miles (0.93 km^{2}) is water.

The village of Elk Rapids is located on an isthmus. To the east of the village is Elk Lake, the 15th-largest inland lake in Michigan and the lowest member of the Elk River Chain of Lakes. To the west of the village is the East Arm of Grand Traverse Bay, a large bay of Lake Michigan. The Elk River bisects the village, flowing northwesterly from Elk Lake to Grand Traverse Bay.

Elk Rapids lies about 2 miles (3.2 km) north of the Grand Traverse County line.

== Climate ==
According to the Köppen climate classification, Elk Rapids has a humid continental climate, labelled Dfb on climate maps. This climatic region has large seasonal temperature differences, with warm to hot (and often humid) summers and cold (sometimes severely cold) winters.

Climate data for Elk Rapids, Michigan
Month	Jan	Feb	Mar	Apr	May	Jun	Jul	Aug	Sep	Oct	Nov	Dec	Year
Mean daily maximum °C (°F)	29 (−2)	31 (−1)	40 (4)	53 (12)	65 (18)	75 (24)	80 (27)	78 (26)	70 (21)	57 (14)	46 (8)	34 (1)	55 (13)
Mean daily minimum °C (°F)	17 (−8)	16 (−9)	22 (−6)	32 (0)	41 (5)	52 (11)	57 (14)	57 (14)	50 (10)	40 (4)	32 (0)	22 (−6)	37 (3)
Average precipitation mm (inches)	1.4 (36)	0.9 (23)	1.5 (38)	2.1 (53)	2.7 (69)	3.2 (81)	2.8 (71)	3.5 (89)	3.5 (89)	3.4 (86)	1.9 (48)	1.6 (41)	28.4 (720)
Source: Weatherbase

== Demographics ==
Historical population
Census	Pop.	Note	%±
1880	620		—
1910	1,673		—
1920	684		−59.1%
1930	615		−10.1%
1940	690		12.2%
1950	889		28.8%
1960	1,015		14.2%
1970	1,249		23.1%
1980	1,504		20.4%
1990	1,626		8.1%
2000	1,700		4.6%
2010	1,642		−3.4%
2020	1,529		−6.9%
U.S. Decennial Census

=== 2020 census ===
As of the 2020 census, Elk Rapids had a population of 1,529. The median age was 57.8 years. 13.7% of residents were under the age of 18 and 36.2% of residents were 65 years of age or older. For every 100 females there were 83.1 males, and for every 100 females age 18 and over there were 82.9 males age 18 and over.

0.0% of residents lived in urban areas, while 100.0% lived in rural areas.

There were 728 households in Elk Rapids, of which 14.6% had children under the age of 18 living in them. Of all households, 45.1% were married-couple households, 16.5% were households with a male householder and no spouse or partner present, and 34.3% were households with a female householder and no spouse or partner present. About 38.8% of all households were made up of individuals and 22.4% had someone living alone who was 65 years of age or older.

There were 1,220 housing units, of which 40.3% were vacant. The homeowner vacancy rate was 2.0% and the rental vacancy rate was 20.0%.

Racial composition as of the 2020 census
Race	Number	Percent
White	1,435	93.9%
Black or African American	0	0.0%
American Indian and Alaska Native	19	1.2%
Asian	17	1.1%
Native Hawaiian and Other Pacific Islander	7	0.5%
Some other race	5	0.3%
Two or more races	46	3.0%
Hispanic or Latino (of any race)	27	1.8%

=== 2010 census ===
As of the census of 2010, there were 1,642 people, 791 households, and 478 families residing in the village. The population density was 995.2 inhabitants per square mile (384.2/km^{2}). There were 1,179 housing units at an average density of 714.5 per square mile (275.9/km^{2}). The racial makeup of the village was 96.6% White, 0.7% African American, 1.2% Native American, 0.5% Asian, 0.1% Pacific Islander, 0.2% from other races, and 0.7% from two or more races. Hispanic or Latino of any race were 1.3% of the population.

There were 791 households, of which 21.0% had children under the age of 18 living with them, 48.4% were married couples living together, 9.6% had a female householder with no husband present, 2.4% had a male householder with no wife present, and 39.6% were non-families. 34.8% of all households were made up of individuals, and 17.9% had someone living alone who was 65 years of age or older. The average household size was 2.07 and the average family size was 2.63.

The median age in the village was 52.4 years. 18.6% of residents were under the age of 18; 5.6% were between the ages of 18 and 24; 16.3% were from 25 to 44; 30.9% were from 45 to 64; and 28.7% were 65 years of age or older. The gender makeup of the village was 46.5% male and 53.5% female.

=== 2000 census ===
As of the census of 2000, there were 1,700 people, 769 households, and 483 families residing in the village. The population density was 1,014.3 inhabitants per square mile (391.6/km^{2}). There were 1,056 housing units at an average density of 630.1 per square mile (243.3/km^{2}). The racial makeup of the village was 97.00% White, 0.29% African American, 1.00% Native American, 0.12% Asian, 0.24% Pacific Islander, 0.59% from other races, and 0.76% from two or more races. Hispanic or Latino of any race were 2.12% of the population.

There were 769 households, out of which 27.8% had children under the age of 18 living with them, 49.7% were married couples living together, 10.8% had a female householder with no husband present, and 37.1% were non-families. 34.6% of all households were made up of individuals, and 17.3% had someone living alone who was 65 years of age or older. The average household size was 2.20 and the average family size was 2.83.

In the village, the population was spread out, with 24.2% under the age of 18, 5.1% from 18 to 24, 23.2% from 25 to 44, 27.5% from 45 to 64, and 19.9% who were 65 years of age or older. The median age was 43 years. For every 100 females, there were 94.5 males. For every 100 females age 18 and over, there were 83.2 males.

The median income for a household in the village was $31,382, and the median income for a family was $45,179. Males had a median income of $30,845 versus $23,167 for females. The per capita income for the village was $19,735. About 7.6% of families and 8.2% of the population were below the poverty line, including 11.1% of those under age 18 and 5.8% of those age 65 or over.

== Education ==
Public K-12 education in Elk Rapids is served by the Elk Rapids Schools district. The district operates Lakeland Elementary School, Cherryland Middle School, and Elk Rapids High School within village limits, as well as Mill Creek Elementary School in the nearby community of Williamsburg, in Grand Traverse County.

== Major highways ==
- US 31 runs north–south through Elk Rapids, east of the central business district. US 31 parallels the shore of Lake Michigan, and can be used to access the nearby cities of Charlevoix and Traverse City.

== Images ==
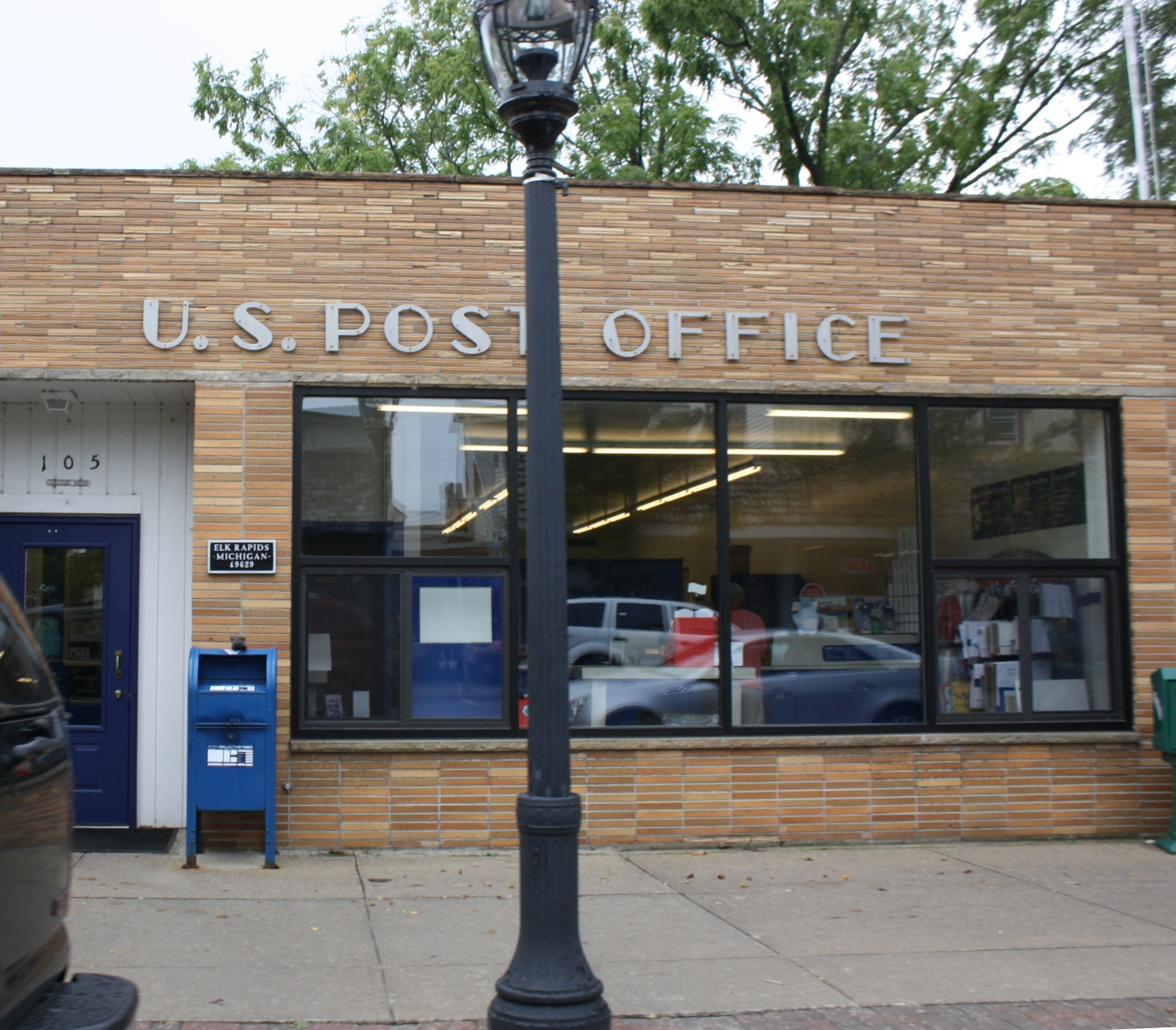
Post office

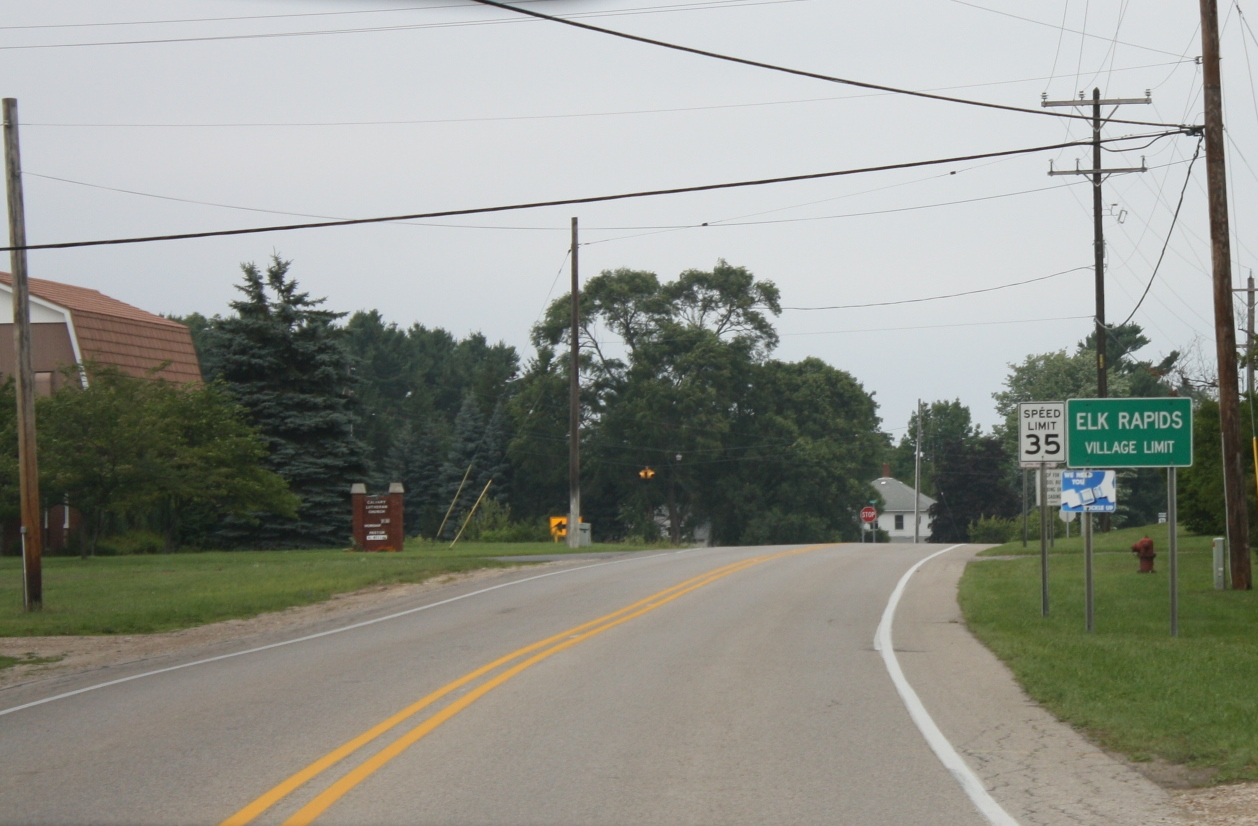
Looking north at the city sign

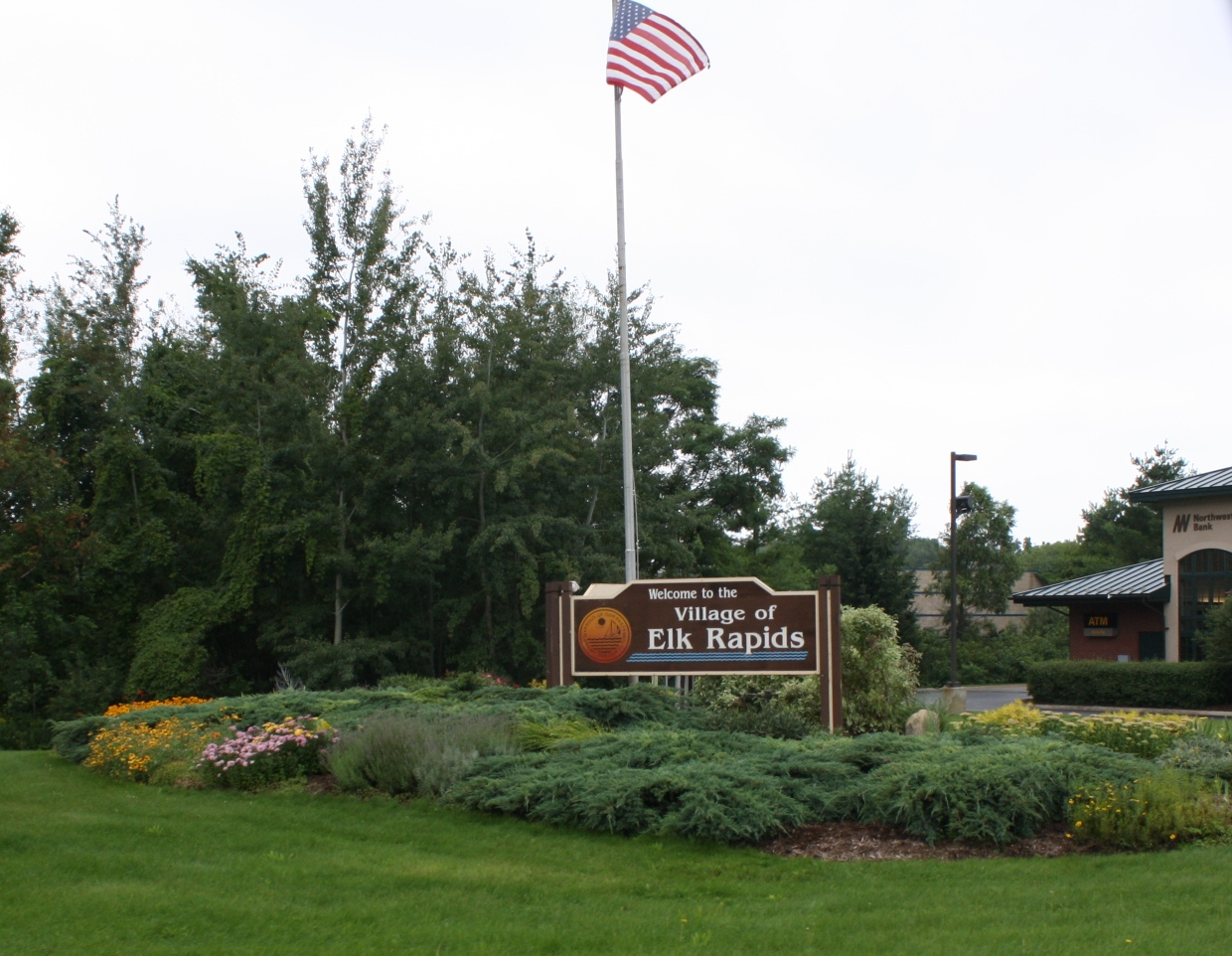
City welcome sign

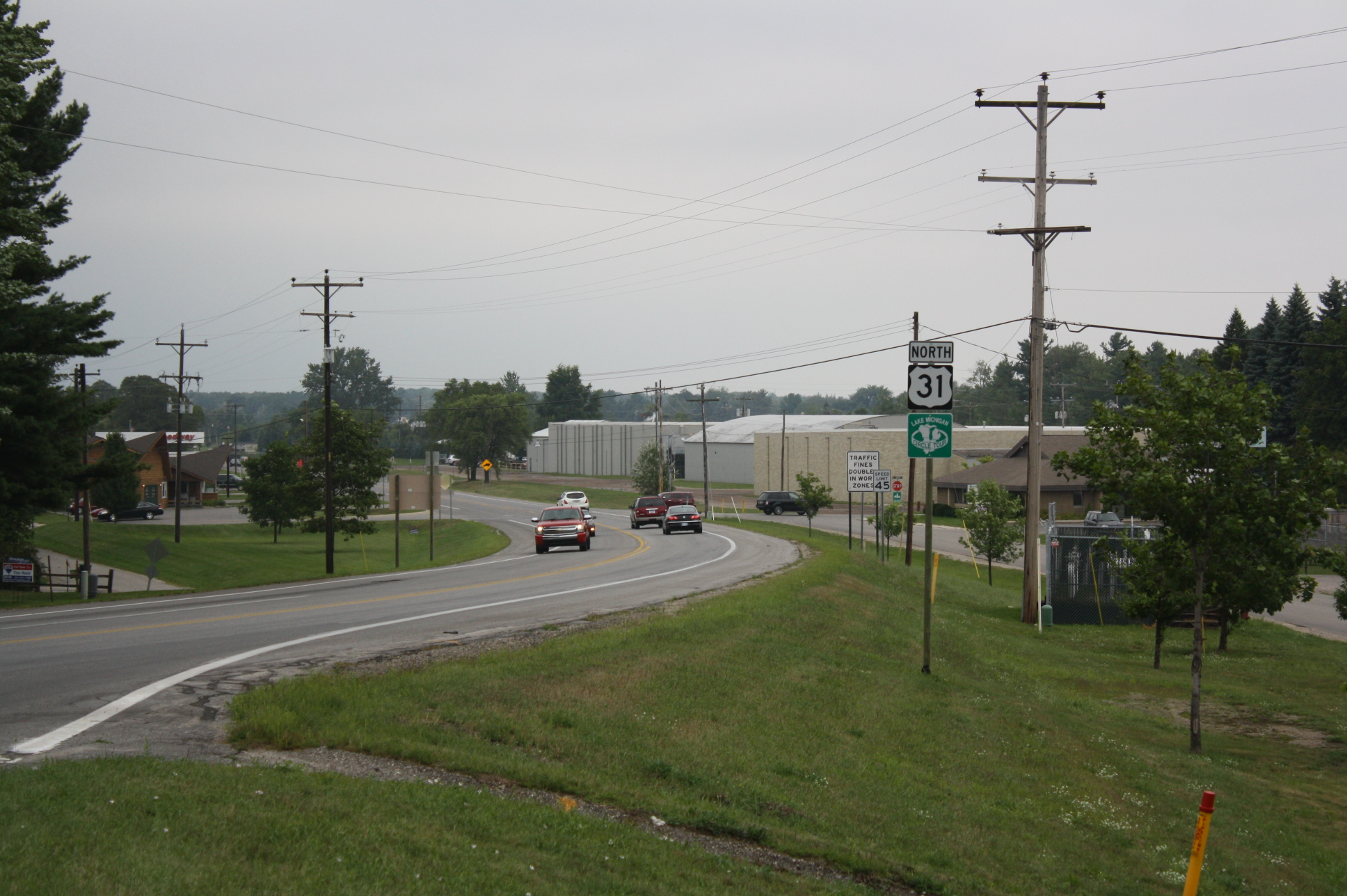
Looking north on US 31

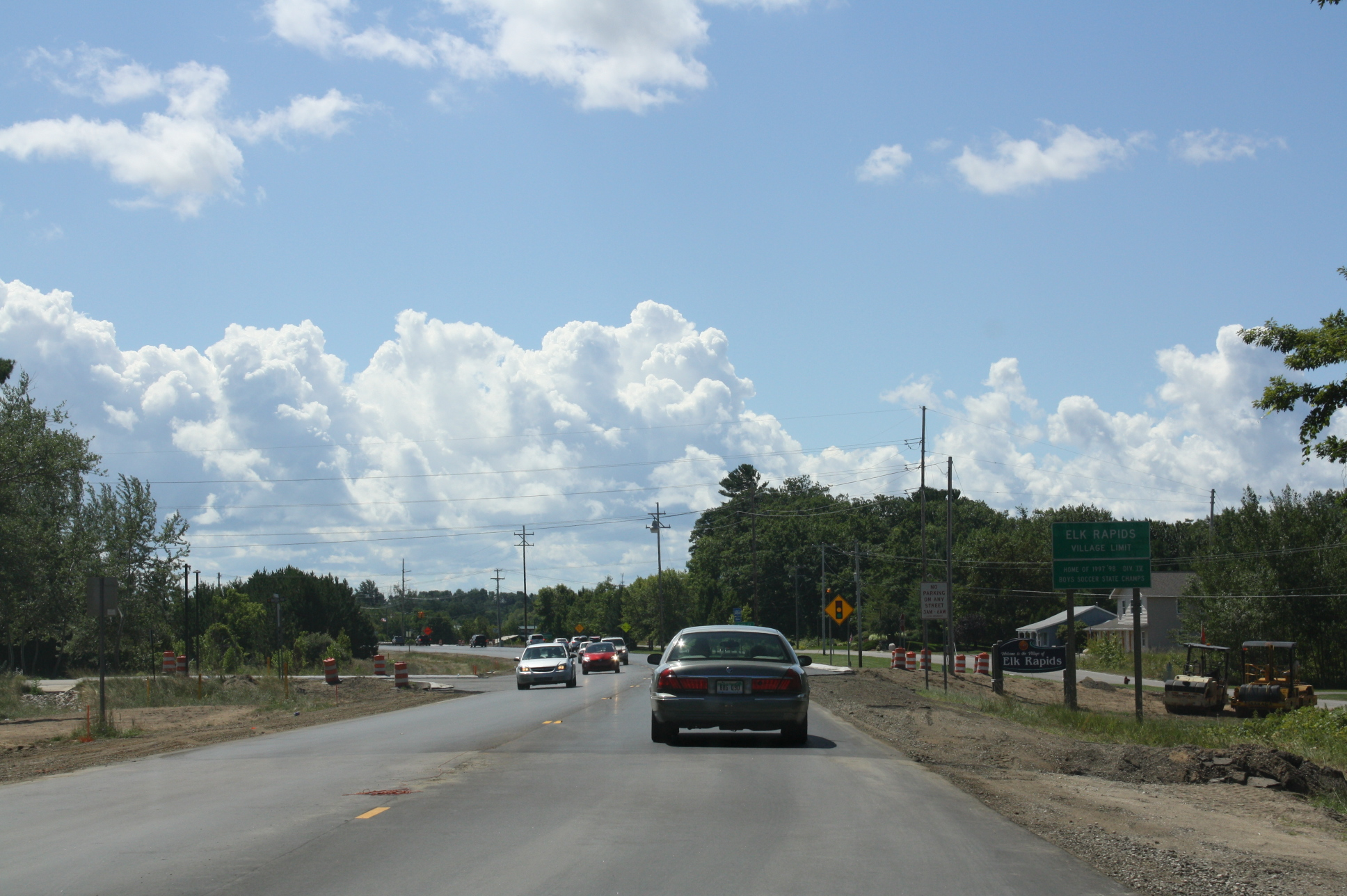
Sign on US 31

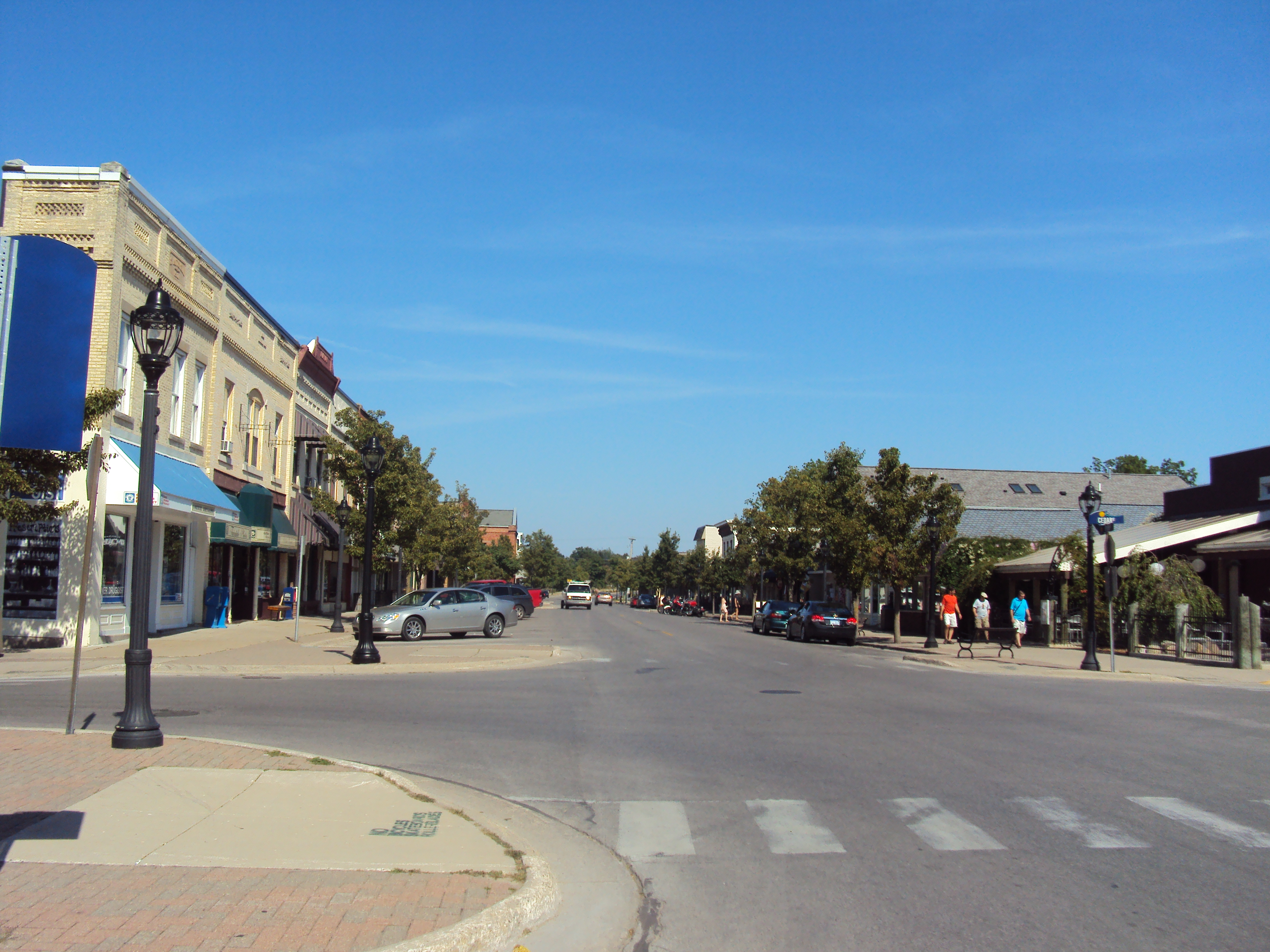
Downtown Elk Rapids on River Street

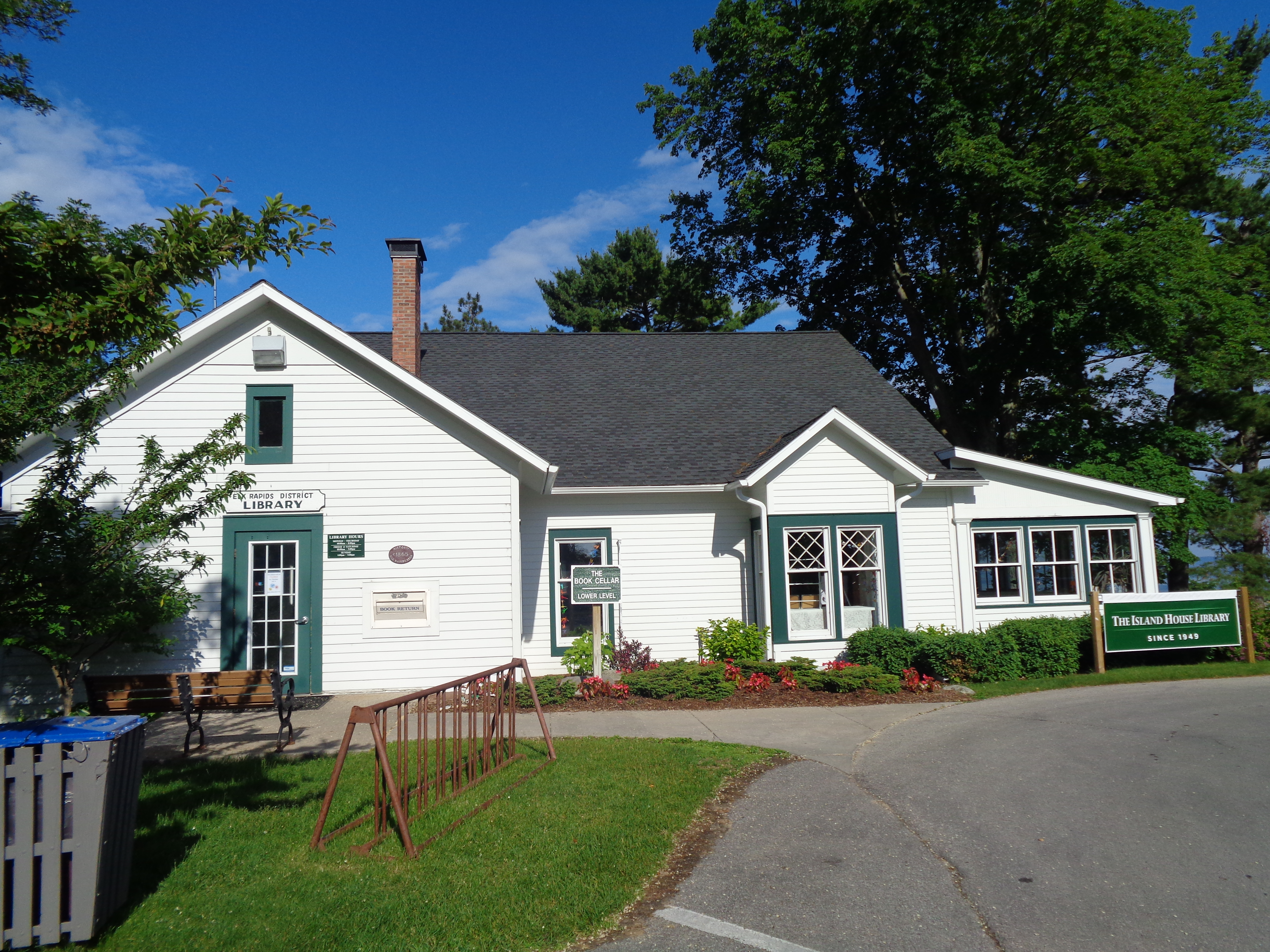
The Island House

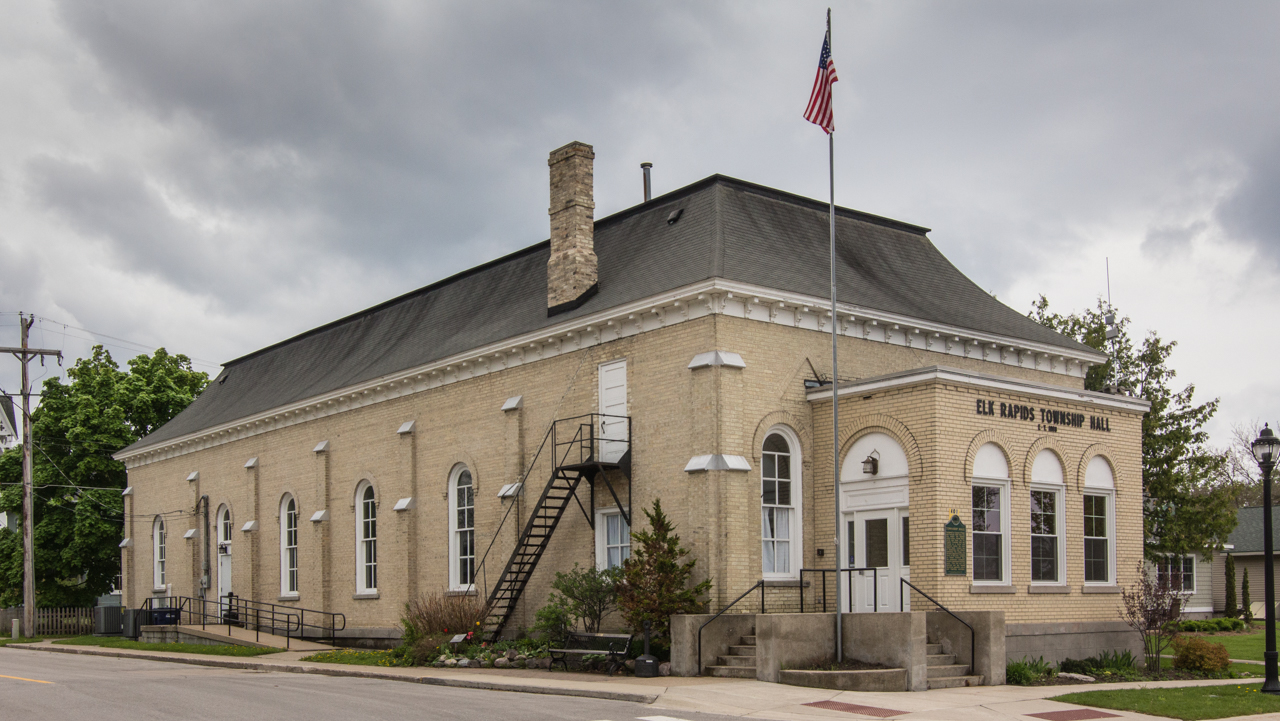
Elk Rapids Township Hall

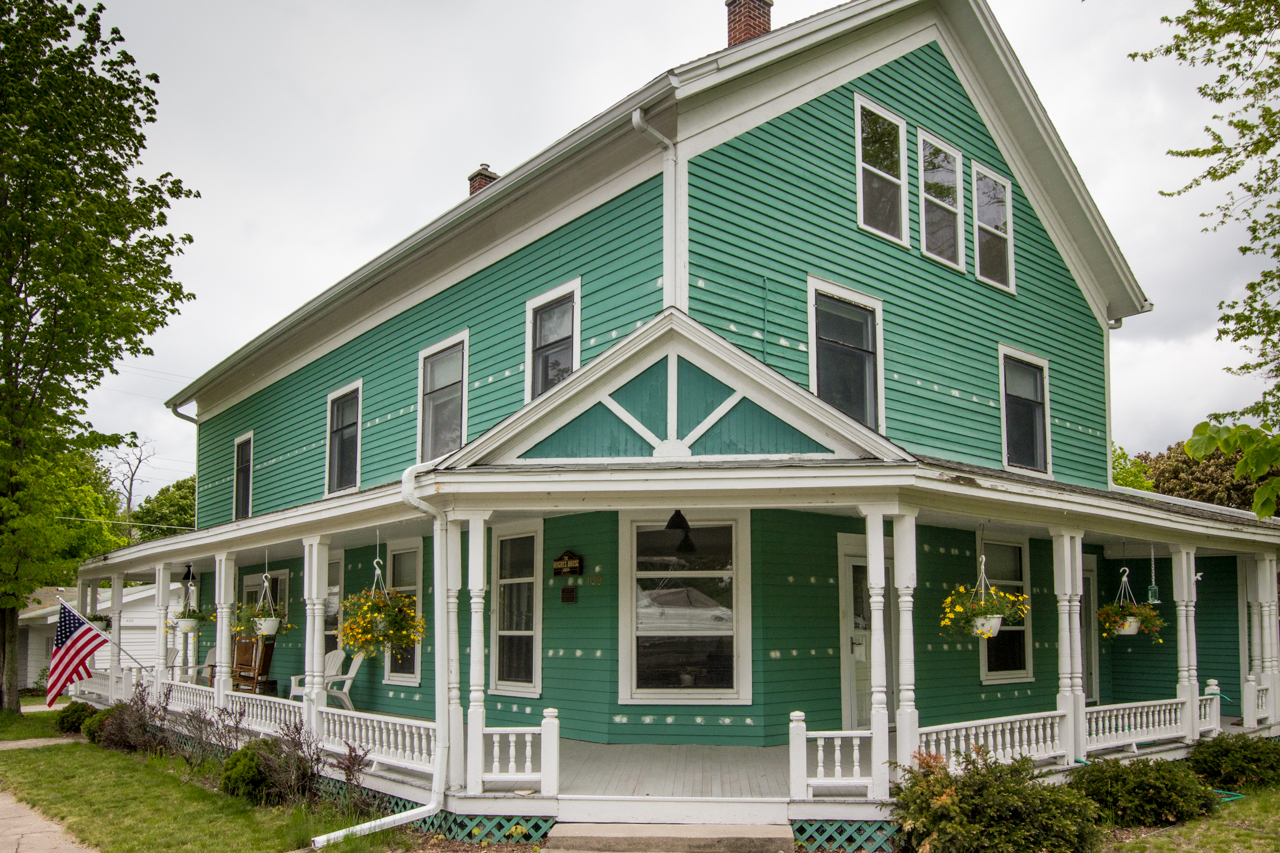
Hughes House

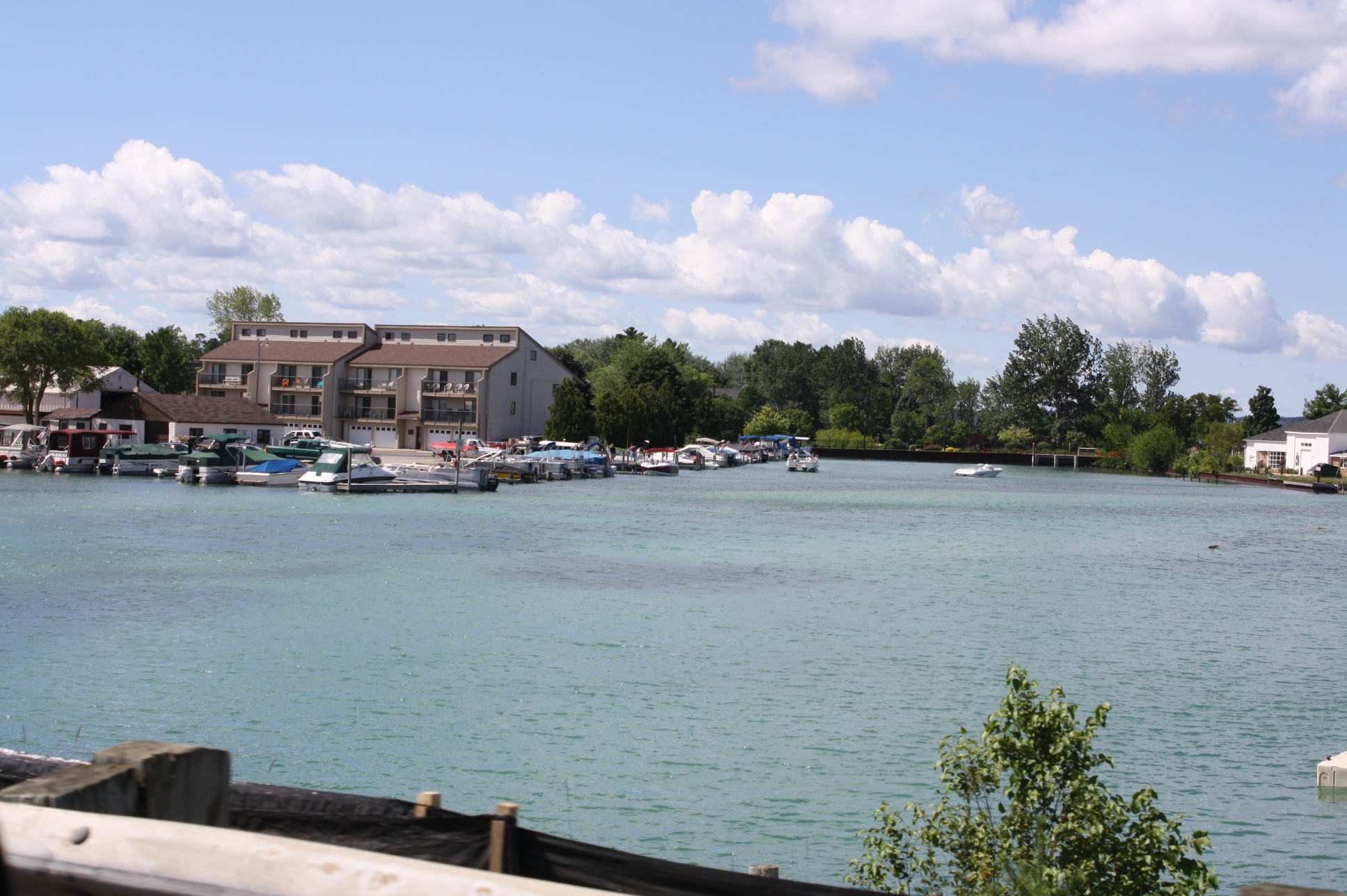
Elk River from US 31

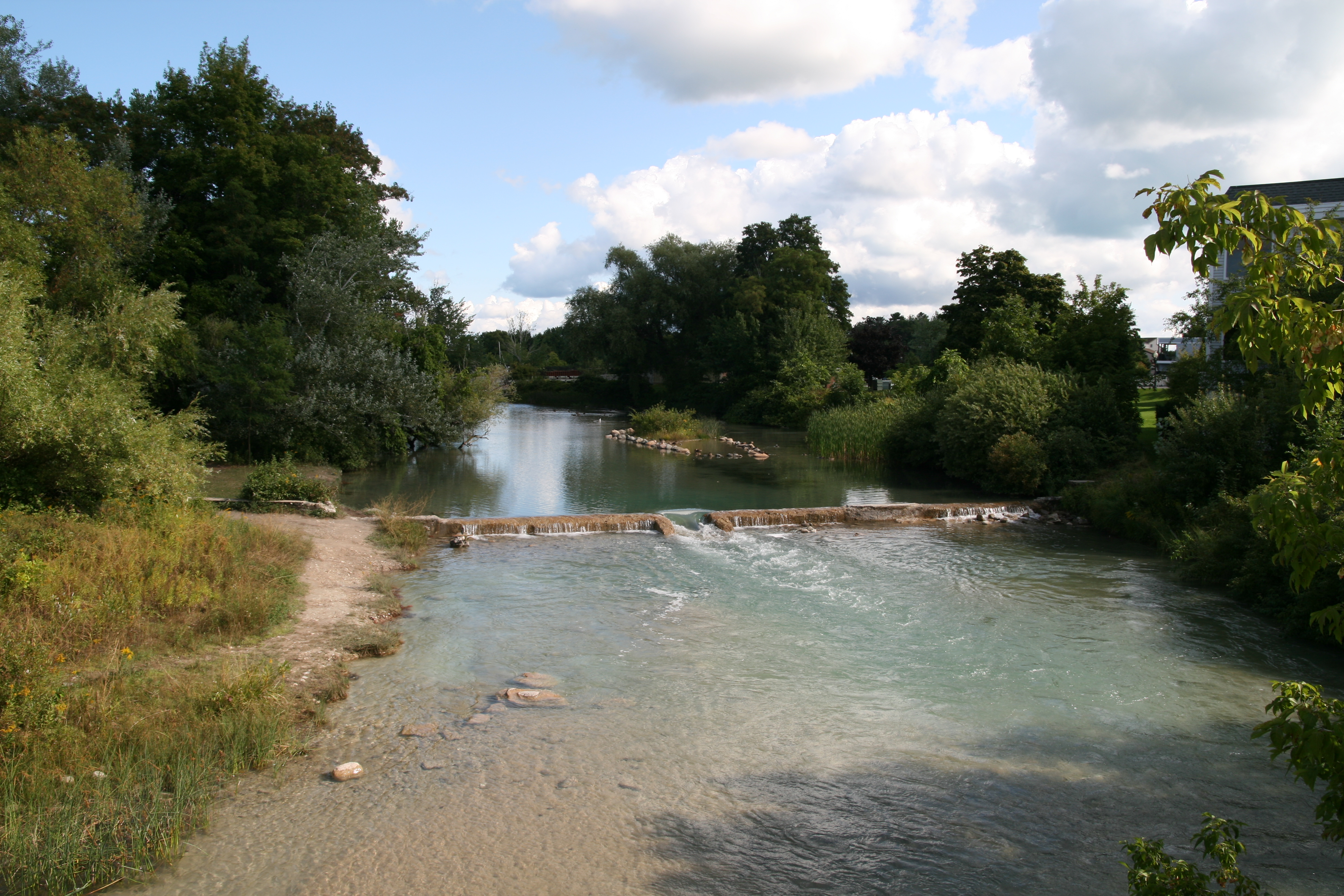
The Elk River

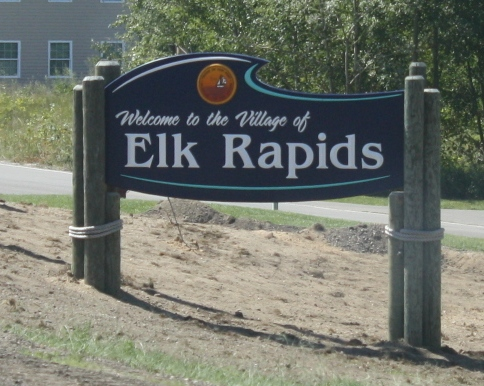
Welcome sign along US 31
