= Hughes School =

- U.S. National Register of Historic Places
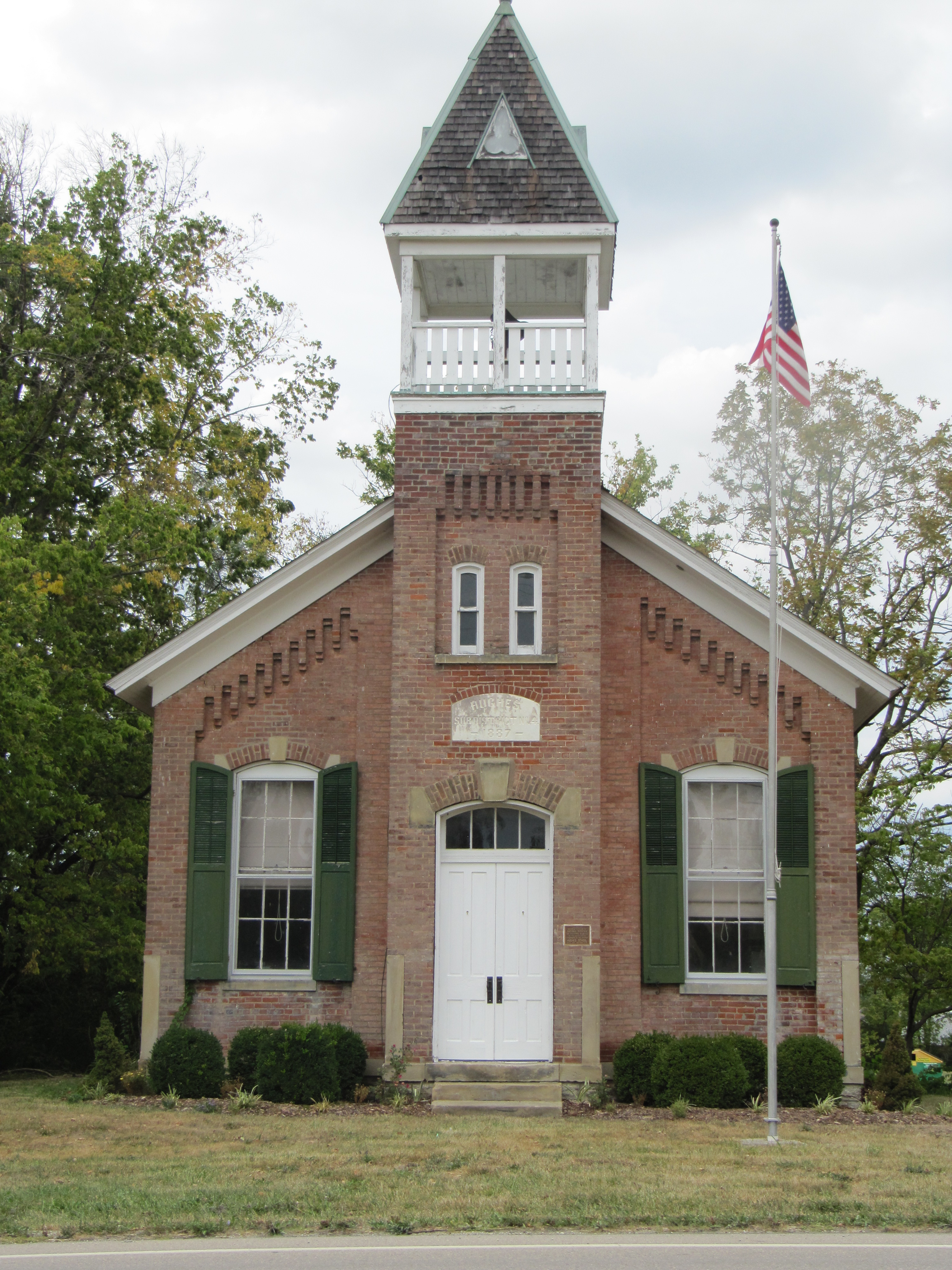
- School building in 2012

- Location within Ohio Location within the United States
- Nearest city: Hamilton, Ohio
- Coordinates: 39°23′13″N 84°25′13″W
- Built: 1887
- NRHP reference No.: 76001377
- Added to NRHP: 2 January 1976

Hughes School is a historic school building near Hamilton, Ohio, United States.

== Description and history ==
Historically a one-room school, the rectangular brick building rests on a stone foundation. The gabled roof has corbeled cornices and the double door entry has a four pane slightly rounded transom. The entry is in a two-story projecting bay that was topped with a bell tower with pyramidal roof. A pair of six over six double hung sash windows flank the door with wooden shutters louvered on top and paneled below. These windows and the door have arched keystone lintels with stone keystones and caps. Brick pilasters divide each side of the building into four bays the rear three have windows which duplicate the windows on the facade. The Hughes School is an example of 19th century one–room schoolhouse architecture.

The land for the school was given to School District No. 4 by Nicholas Curtis in 1832. Elijah Hughes served as school director for the district at that time and is mentioned in the original deed. The school was built in 1887. It was listed on the National Register of Historic Places on January 2, 1976.

== See also ==
- Historic preservation
- History of education in the United States
- Stonemasonry
