= Whitewater Township, Michigan =

- Civil township
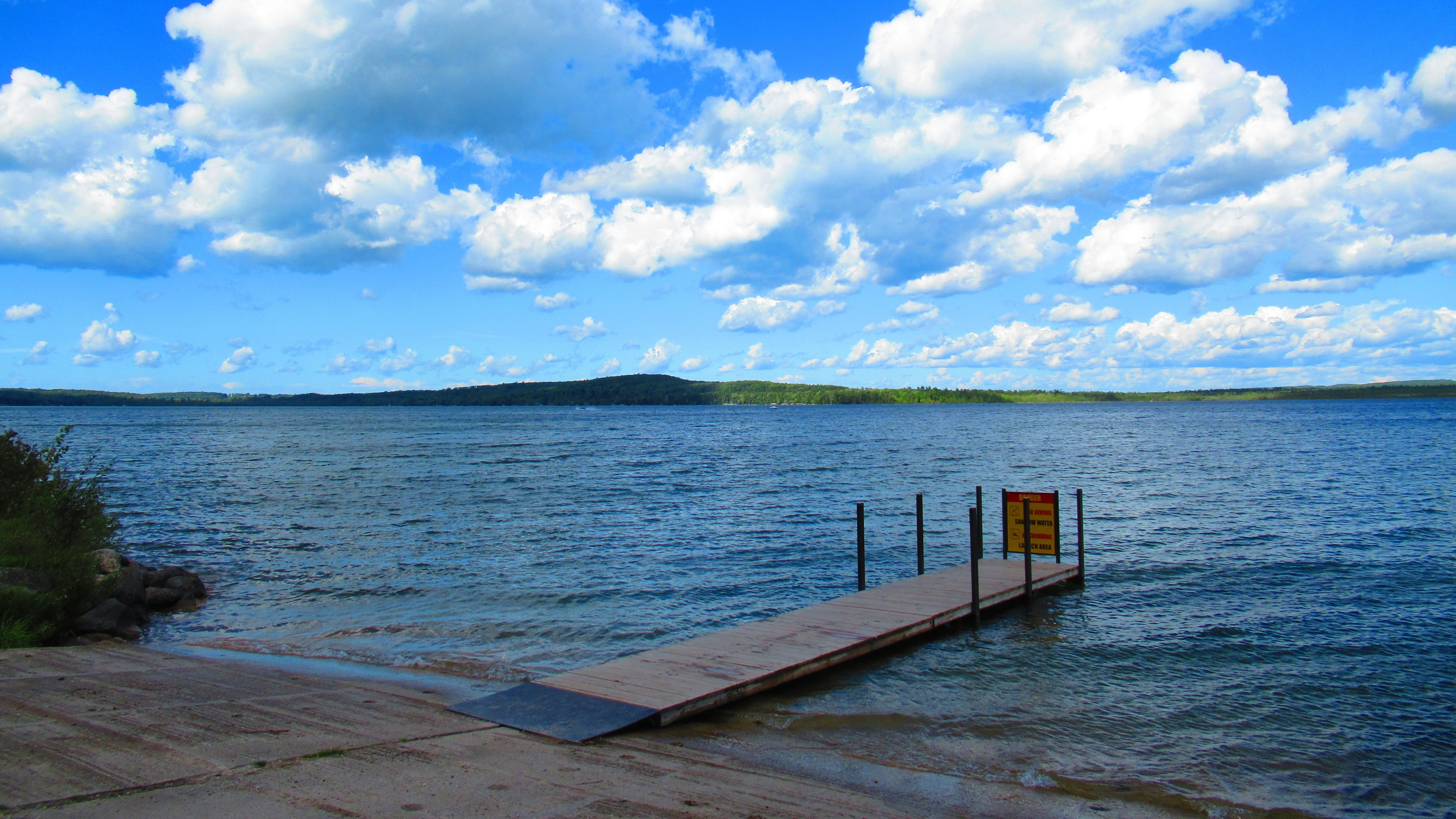
- View of Lake Skegemog

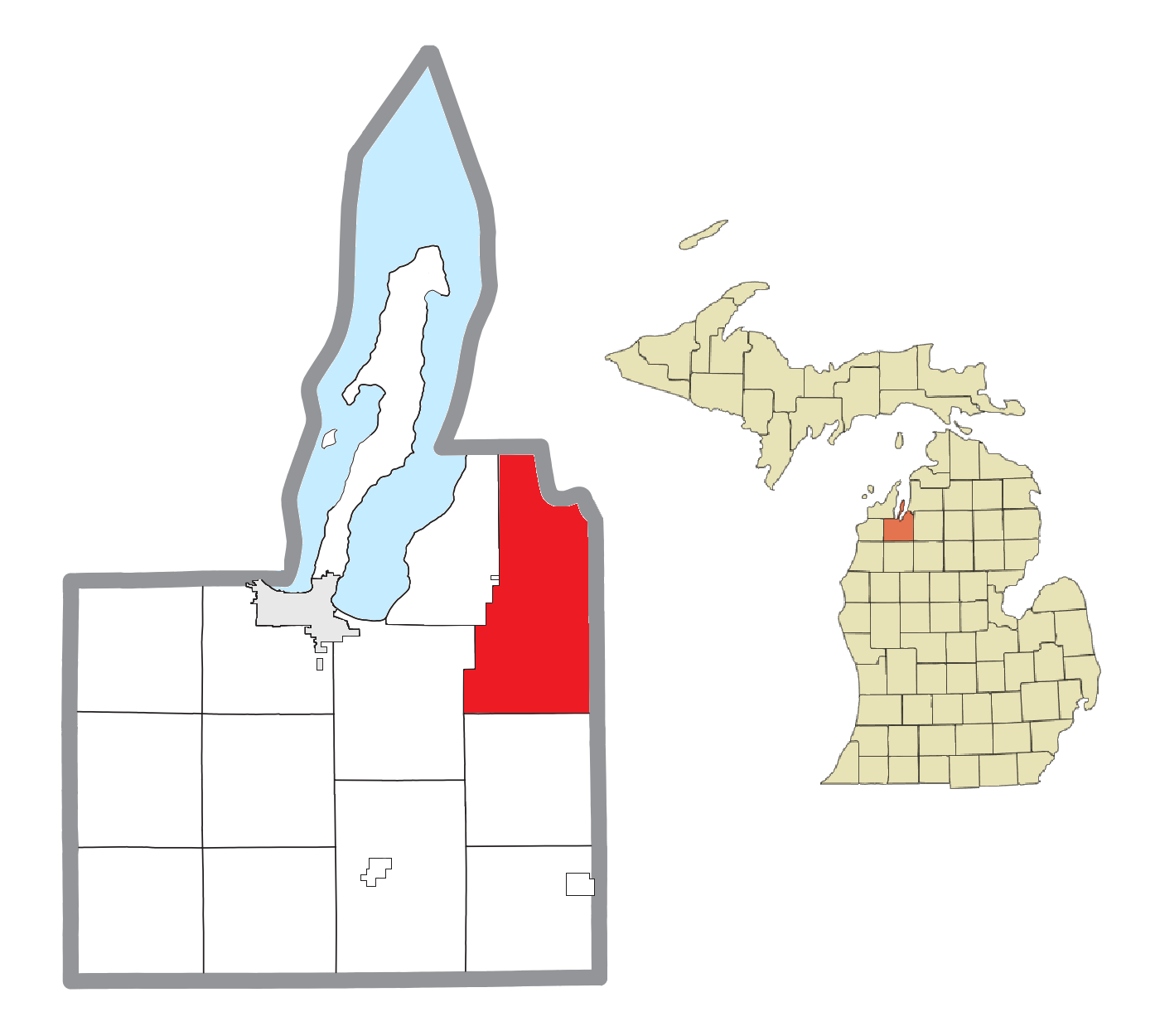
- Location within Grand Traverse County

- Location within the state of Michigan Whitewater Township (the United States)
- Coordinates: 44°45′19″N 85°23′24″W
- Country: United States
- State: Michigan
- County: Grand Traverse
- Organized: October 1859

Government
  - Supervisor: Linda Slopsema
  - Clerk: Wendy Hoeksema
  - Treasurer: Jill Koester
  - Trustee: Randy Mielnik
  - Trustee: Tim Arends

Area
  - Total: 53.6 sq mi (138.8 km^{2})
  - Land: 47.8 sq mi (123.9 km^{2})
  - Water: 5.8 sq mi (14.9 km^{2})
- Elevation: 817 ft (249 m)

Population (2020)
  - Total: 2,688
  - Density: 52/sq mi (19.9/km^{2})
- Time zone: UTC-5 (Eastern (EST))
  - Summer (DST): UTC-4 (EDT)
- ZIP code(s): 49690 (Williamsburg); 49696 (Traverse City)
- Area code: 231
- FIPS code: 26-87040
- GNIS feature ID: 1627268
- Website: https://www.whitewatertownshipmi.gov/

Whitewater Township is a civil township of Grand Traverse County in the U.S. state of Michigan. The population was 2,688 at the 2020 census, an increase from 2,597 at the 2010 census. Whitewater Township includes shores on Elk Lake and Lake Skegemog, two large lakes in the Chain of Lakes. A portion of the township is within the Grand Traverse Indian Reservation.

== History ==
Whitewater Township was organized in October 1859 from part of Traverse Township. This makes it Grand Traverse County's third township, after Traverse Township and Peninsula Township. The township was named after the Whitewater River, which has since been renamed Acme Creek.

== Communities ==
- Angell (often spelled Angel) is a ghost town in the north of the township. A rail line from Williamsburg to Elk Rapids was built in the area in 1892. Angell was established as a depot and post office on the line, with the post office lasting from 1892 to 1909. The community was located at 44°49′51.3″N 85°24′58.1″W.
- Mabel (sometimes spelled Mable) is a ghost town located at 44°46′20″N 85°21′25″W. Mable was established as lumber settlement and station on the new Chicago and West Michigan Railway in 1892.
- Williamsburg is an unincorporated community in the township on M-72 about midway between Traverse City and Kalkaska at 44°46′25″N 85°24′14″W.

== Geography ==
According to the United States Census Bureau, the township has a total area of 53.6 square miles (139 km^{2}), of which 47.8 square miles (124 km^{2}) is land and 5.8 square miles (15 km^{2}) (10.77%) is water.

Whitewater Township forms the northeastern corner of Grand Traverse County, bordering Antrim County to the north and Kalkaska County to the east.

Portions of Elk Lake and Lake Skegemog, both of which forming part of the Chain of Lakes, lie within Whitewater Township. These lakes form part of the county line, with both Antrim and Kalkaska counties.

=== Adjacent townships ===
By land

- Elk Rapids Township, Antrim County (north)
- Clearwater Township, Kalkaska County (east)
- Kalkaska Township, Kalkaska County (east)
- Boardman Township, Kalkaska County (southeast)
- Union Township (south)
- East Bay Township (southwest)
- Acme Township (west)

By water

- Milton Township, Antrim County (northeast)

=== Transportation ===
Only one state trunkline highway, M-72, runs through Whitewater Township. The highway runs east–west through the center of the township. To the west, M-72 reaches a junction with US 31 at Acme, and continues toward Traverse City. To the east, M-72 enters Kalkaska County, and reaches a junction with US 131 and M-66 in Kalkaska.

Grand Traverse County Roads 605 (Elk Lake Road/Williamsburg Road) and 660 (Supply Road) serve as local thoroughfares in the township.

== Demographics ==
As of the census of 2000, there were 2,467 people, 896 households, and 712 families residing in the township. The population density was 51.6 inhabitants per square mile (19.9/km^{2}). There were 1,176 housing units at an average density of 24.6 per square mile (9.5/km^{2}). The racial makeup of the township was 97.08% White, 0.28% African American, 0.93% Native American, 0.57% Asian, 0.20% Pacific Islander, 0.28% from other races, and 0.65% from two or more races. Hispanic or Latino of any race were 0.93% of the population.

There were 896 households, out of which 37.7% had children under the age of 18 living with them, 70.8% were married couples living together, 4.9% had a female householder with no husband present, and 20.5% were non-families. 15.3% of all households were made up of individuals, and 5.8% had someone living alone who was 65 years of age or older. The average household size was 2.72 and the average family size was 3.02.

In the township the population was spread out, with 27.0% under the age of 18, 5.0% from 18 to 24, 28.9% from 25 to 44, 27.0% from 45 to 64, and 12.0% who were 65 years of age or older. The median age was 40 years. For every 100 females, there were 103.4 males. For every 100 females age 18 and over, there were 103.8 males.

The median income for a household in the township was $49,572, and the median income for a family was $54,737. Males had a median income of $38,500 versus $22,438 for females. The per capita income for the township was $21,890. About 3.4% of families and 4.9% of the population were below the poverty line, including 5.1% of those under age 18 and 4.8% of those age 65 or over.
