= Skegemog Point Site =

Archaeological site in Michigan, United States

- U.S. National Register of Historic Places
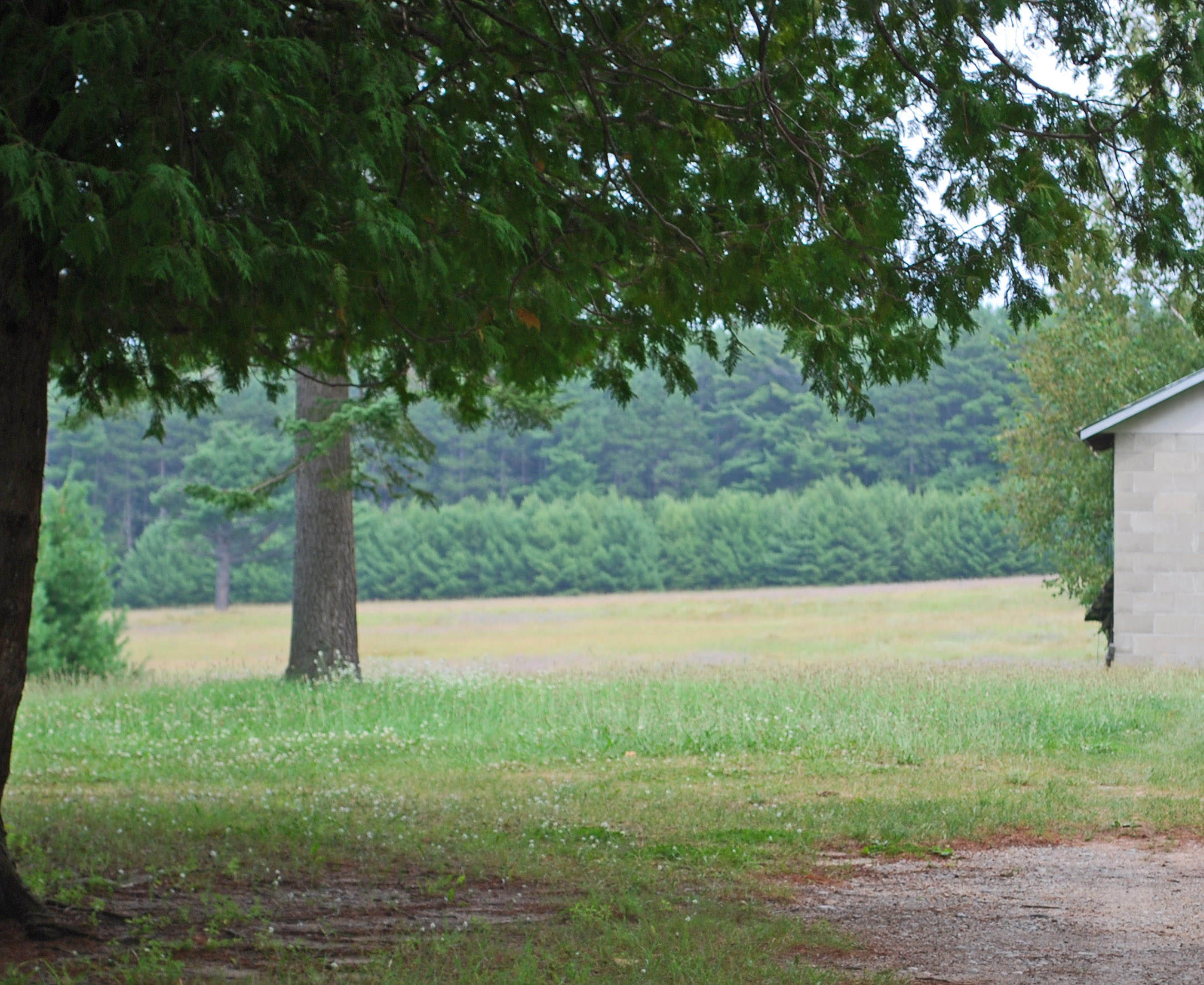

- Location within Michigan Location within the United States
- Location: 8298 Skegemog Point Rd. Williamsburg, Michigan
- Coordinates: 44°48′30″N 85°21′0″W
- Area: 15.5 acres (6.3 ha)
- NRHP reference No.: 72001474
- Added to NRHP: March 24, 1972

The Skegemog Point Site, also known as the Samels Field Site or Samels Site and designated 20GT2, is an archaeological site located on the property of the Samels Farm at 8298 Skegemog Point Road, near Williamsburg, Michigan. Material at the site spans over 10,000 years, and the site is unique in that, due to glacial rebound, it is horizontally stratified rather than vertically stratified. The site was listed on the National Register of Historic Places in 1972.

== History ==
In 1889, Frank and Mary Samels purchased 64 acres of land on Skegemog Point, the peninsula separating Lake Skegemog from Elk Lake. While farming the site, he discovered many Indian artifacts, arrow points and axes, as well as many mounds and pits along the lakeshore. In the 1920s, an archaeologist from the University of Michigan surveyed the site, and in 1930 department head Wilbert B. Hinsdale did further work. Frank Samels died in 1955, and passed the farm to his three sons Dennis, Ben, and Rob Samels. In 1965, the Samels gave permission to Charles Cleland, Michigan State University Museum Curator, to excavate the site. Cleland discovered evidence of a long history of habitation at the site. In 1972, the site was placed on the National Register of Historic Places.

In the 1990s, the Samels entered into an agreement with The Archaeological Conservancy to preserve the entire farm, including the archaeological site. After the last of the Samels brothers died in 2002, the Conservancy leased the farm to a nonprofit group, the Samels Family Heritage Society, and it became an education center.

== Description ==
The Skegemog Point Site includes artifacts from a range of time periods, including Paleo-Indian, Archaic, and Late Woodland periods. The material at the site is primarily at or near the surface, and is spread over a 15.5-acre (6.3 ha) area on and below a beach terrace, and extending into the lake. The site is horizontally stratified, with the Paleo-Indian section, dating to around 10,000 BCE, located at the highest elevation furthest from the lakeshore. This is due to glacial rebound, where the underlying limestone slowly rises, changing the relative location of the lakeshore. The Archaic section, dating to perhaps 3000 BCE, is located closer to the lakeshore, and the Late Woodland section, dating to around 900-1200 AD, is located nearest the shore.

The Late Woodland section of the site was partially excavated in the 1960s. It contains at least 26 hearth areas, as well as charcoal, potsherds, bone fragments and seeds. It also contains multiple postmolds set in circular configurations of about 10 feet (3.0 m) in diameter, suggesting temporary or seasonal wigwam-type structures. The other portions of the site have not been extensively excavated, although Clovis points have been found in the older portion of the site.
