= Torch River (Michigan) =

Location
- Country: United States
- State: Michigan
- Cities: Torch River

Physical characteristics
- Source
  - location: Torch Lake
  - coordinates: 44°51′02″N 85°19′40″W
- Mouth
  - location: Lake Skegemog
  - coordinates: 44°49′23″N 85°19′00″W
- Length: 2.1 mi (3.4 km)

Basin features
- Progression: Torch Lake → Torch River → Lake Skegemog → Elk Lake → Elk River → Grand Traverse Bay → Lake Michigan
- Tributaries
  - left: Rapid River

The Torch River is a short river in the Northern Lower Peninsula of the U.S. state of Michigan. At 2.1 miles (3.4 km) in length, the river connects Torch Lake to Lake Skegemog, and is a crucial link in the Elk River Chain of Lakes Watershed. The river is divided along its entire length between Antrim and Kalkaska counties. The northern source of the river is home to a Michigan Department of Natural Resources (DNR) Access Site.

The Rapid River is a major tributary of the Torch River.

== See also ==
- Elk Lake
