= Clearwater Township, Michigan =

- Civil township
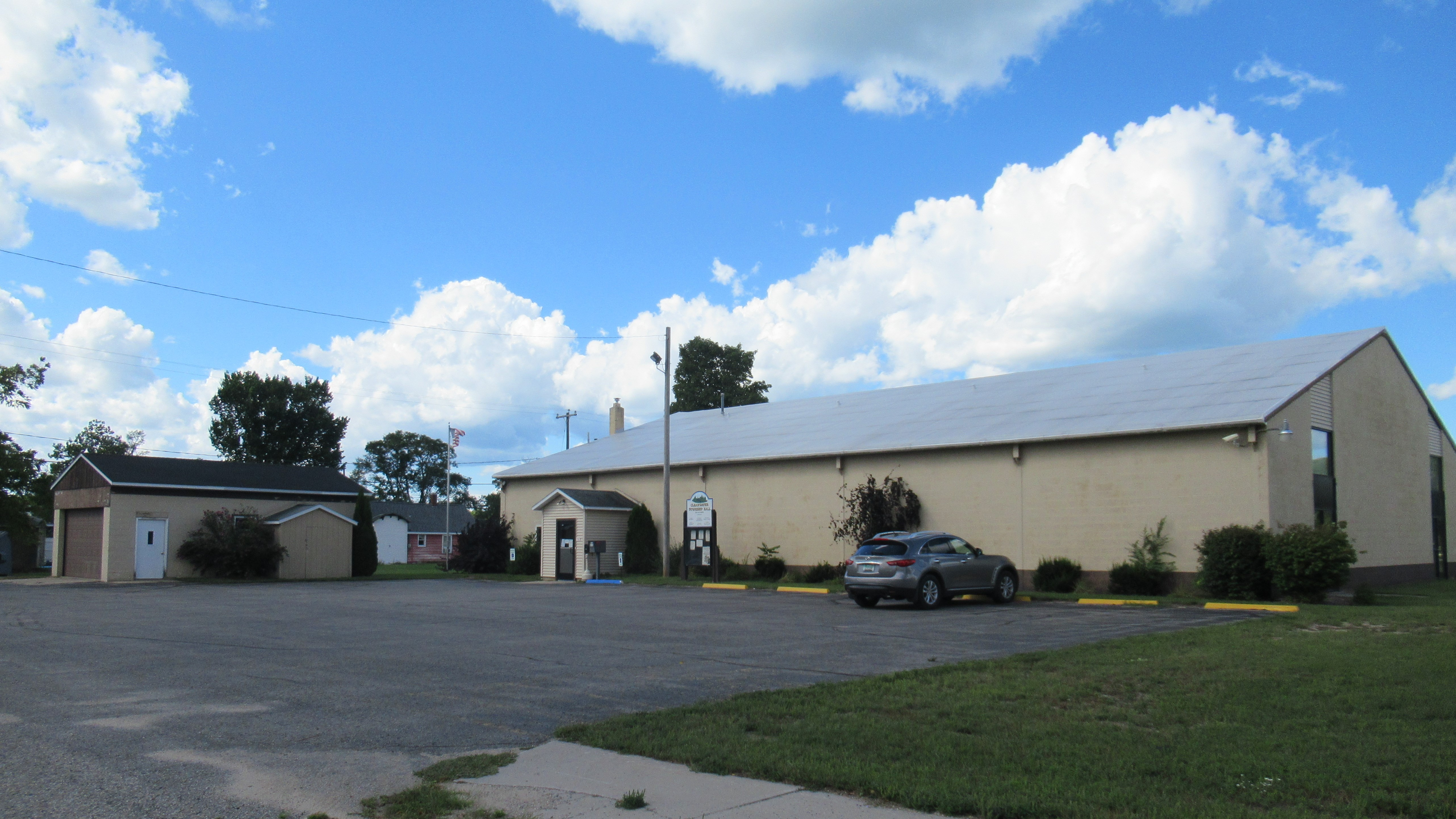
- Clearwater Township Hall

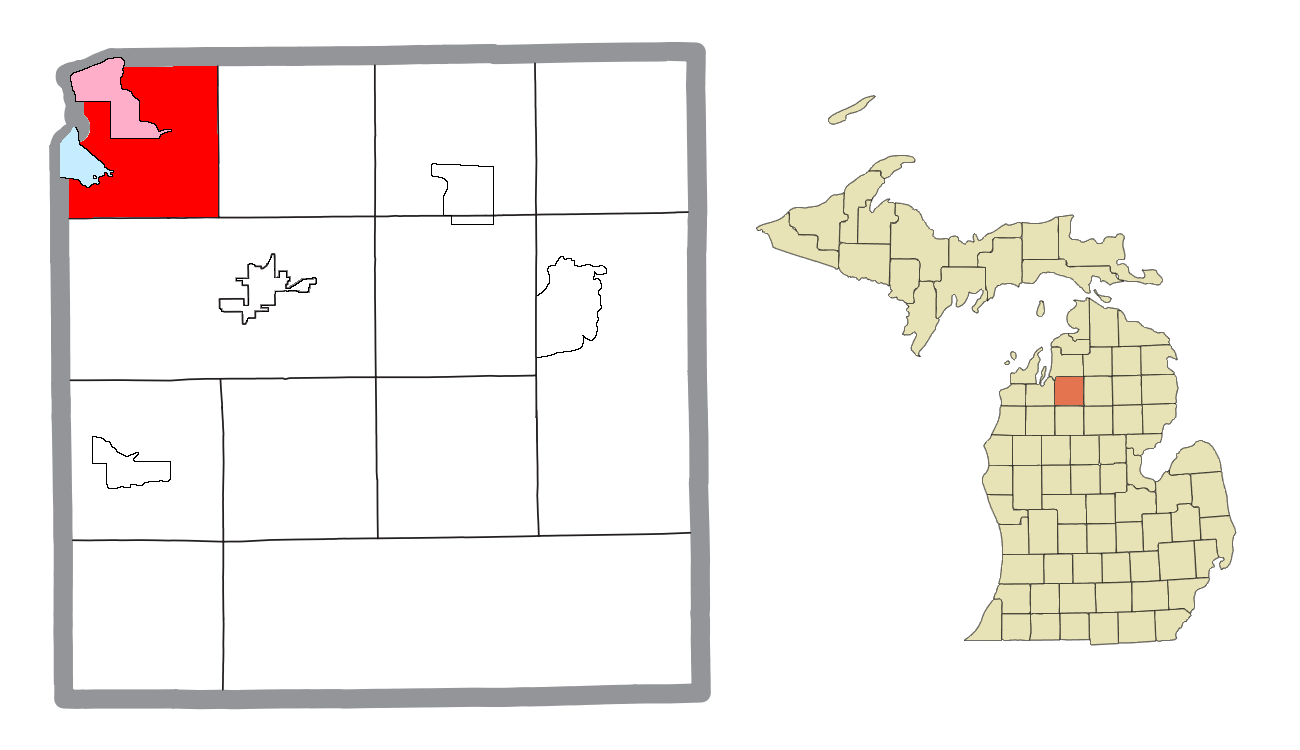
- Location within Kalkaska County (red) and the administered community of Rapid City (pink)

- Location within the state of Michigan Clearwater Township (the United States)
- Coordinates: 44°49′27″N 85°17′01″W
- Country: United States
- State: Michigan
- County: Kalkaska
- Organized: 1867

Government
  - Supervisor: Mike Gaylord
  - Clerk: Jule Moore

Area
  - Total: 33.79 sq mi (87.5 km^{2})
  - Land: 31.17 sq mi (80.7 km^{2})
  - Water: 2.62 sq mi (6.8 km^{2})
- Elevation: 650 ft (198 m)

Population (2020)
  - Total: 2,497
  - Density: 78.4/sq mi (30.3/km^{2})
- Time zone: UTC-5 (Eastern (EST))
  - Summer (DST): UTC-4 (EDT)
- ZIP code(s): 49612 (Alden); 49676 (Rapid City); 49690 (Williamsburg)
- Area code: 231
- FIPS code: 26-16340
- GNIS feature ID: 1626094
- Website: Official website

Clearwater Township is a civil township of Kalkaska County in the U.S. state of Michigan. As of the 2020 census, the township population was 2,497.

== Communities ==
- Barker Creek is an unincorporated community on M-72, about seven miles northwest of Kalkaska at 44°46′49″N 85°18′48″W.
- Rapid City is an unincorporated community and census-designated place at 44°50′04″N 85°16′57″W on the Rapid River.
- Torch River is an unincorporated community at 44°51′04″N 85°19′26″W at the south end of Torch Lake, where the eponymous Torch River exits the lake and is joined by the Rapid River. A portion of the community is on the west side of the river in Milton Township, Antrim County.

== History ==
The first permanent white settler in what is now Kalkaska County was William George Copeland, a farmer born in Nottinghamshire, who located there in the fall of 1855, while it was still attached to Grand Traverse County. For the next twelve years, he and his wife were the only permanent white residents of the county. A dam had been built on the Barker Creek about the time Copeland moved there, but a planned mill was never built. The next permanent resident in the township was William H. Bockes, a native of Medina County, Ohio and a Civil War veteran. In June 1866, he purchased land in the township near Barker Creek. After returning to Ohio to marry his wife in October, they both returned immediately to take up residence. Another early resident in the Barker Creek area was John H.F. Letherby, born in England and moved to Canada at the age of 16. He settled in section 32 near Barker Creek in October 1866.

The township was organized in 1867.

In section 36 in the southeast corner of the township, a few related families originally from Susquehanna County, Pennsylvania, made their homes. D.P. Beebe, another Civil War veteran, was the first to arrive in the spring of 1867. Norman Ross, his father-in-law came in the summer of 1867 and became the first township supervisor when it was organized. A.C. Beebe, also a Civil War veteran, came in May 1868.

Elisha W. Clement, from Brantford, Ontario settled in section 14 in December 1867. Albert T. Kellogg, from Cortland County, New York, settled in section 14 in September 1868.

Kalkaska County remained unorganized and attached first to Grand Traverse County and then Antrim County until an act of the Michigan Legislature of January 27, 1871. Rapid River Township was the first township organized in the county, while it was still attached to Antrim County for administrative purposes. The township was organized in 1868 so that residents in the area would be able to vote in the presidential election without having to travel all the way to Antrim County. At that time, Rapid River Township encompassed several townships that were later separately organized. Clearwater Township was originally organized as "Round Lake" by an act of the Michigan Legislature on January 18, 1871, and was renamed Clearwater Township in January 1873. A post office with the name of "Clear Water" had been established in May 1869 and renamed "Clearwater" in December 1873. There was also a post office at Barker Creek from February 1874 until May 1937. Barker Creek was a station on the Chicago and West Michigan Railway (now the Pere Marquette Railroad).

== Geography ==
According to the United States Census Bureau, the township has a total area of 33.79 square miles (87.52 km^{2}), of which 31.17 square miles (80.73 km^{2}) is land and 2.62 square miles (6.79 km^{2}) (7.75%) is water.

Torch Lake borders the northern edge of the township, and Lake Skegemog occupies a portion of the western section of the township. Rapid River flows through the center of the township.

Clearwater Township forms the northwest corner of Kalkaska County, and is adjacent to both Antrim and Grand Traverse counties.

=== Major highway ===
- M-72 is an east-west highway in the southwest of the township, entering from the west (Grand Traverse County) and exiting to the south (Kalkaska Township).

== Demographics ==
As of the census of 2000, there were 2,382 people, 944 households, and 681 families residing in the township. The population density was 76.5 inhabitants per square mile (29.5/km^{2}). There were 1,375 housing units at an average density of 44.1 per square mile (17.0/km^{2}). The racial makeup of the township was 97.52% White, 0.04% African American, 0.67% Native American, 0.21% Asian, 0.13% from other races, and 1.43% from two or more races. Hispanic or Latino of any race were 0.84% of the population.

There were 944 households, out of which 30.4% had children under the age of 18 living with them, 61.3% were married couples living together, 6.9% had a female householder with no husband present, and 27.8% were non-families. 22.2% of all households were made up of individuals, and 7.0% had someone living alone who was 65 years of age or older. The average household size was 2.52 and the average family size was 2.93.

In the township the population was spread out, with 24.5% under the age of 18, 6.9% from 18 to 24, 29.7% from 25 to 44, 26.4% from 45 to 64, and 12.5% who were 65 years of age or older. The median age was 39 years. For every 100 females, there were 105.3 males. For every 100 females age 18 and over, there were 100.3 males.

The median income for a household in the township was $37,008, and the median income for a family was $42,056. Males had a median income of $31,932 versus $20,085 for females. The per capita income for the township was $16,961. About 5.5% of families and 7.9% of the population were below the poverty line, including 8.7% of those under age 18 and 3.9% of those age 65 or over.
