= Dragstedt =

Dragstedt is a surname. Notable people with the surname include:

- Carl Dragstedt (1895–1983), American scientist
- Lester Dragstedt (1893–1975), American surgeon
