= Rapid City (disambiguation) =

Rapid City is a city in South Dakota.

Rapid City may also refer to:

== Canada ==
- Rapid City, Manitoba

== United States ==
- Rapids City, Illinois
- Rapid City, Michigan, an unincorporated community of Clearwater Township, Michigan
