= Grand Rapids, Kalkaska and Southeastern Railroad =

Railroad in Michigan

The Grand Rapids, Kalkaska and Southeastern Railroad is a defunct railroad which operated in Northern Michigan toward the end of the 19th century. The company was founded on August 30, 1897 by William Alden Smith, a Republican politician and former general counsel of both the Chicago and West Michigan Railway and the Detroit, Lansing and Northern Railroad. The GRK&S constructed a 40.73-mile (65.55 km) line from Stratford in northern Missaukee County through Kalkaska (crossing the Grand Rapids & Indiana) to Rapid City, where it met the C&WM's main line. The C&WM undertook to supply rolling stock and oversee construction in exchange for a 10-year lease of the line.

The C&WM's lease of the GRK&S was continued by the Pere Marquette Railway following the consolidation of 1899. In 1903, however, the PM bought the capital stock of the GRK&S. The line does not appear to have been particularly profitable; it mainly transported lumber, the quantity of which declined over the next decade. In 1915 a Pere Marquette official lamented the poor state of the line:

It is bad. There are 14 miles of the track from Eastman Junction to the end at Stratford that is so bad that we operate it under caution and I am about to ask the railroad commission for the authority to take it up. There is no business on the branch to warrant our continuing in operation and we are now going up there twice a week to bring out what little business there is.

Abandonment followed swiftly. In 1916 the Pere Marquette cut the line back to Spencer, eliminating the 14 miles (23 km) which had so concerned it. In 1918 it pulled back to Kalkaska, another 7 miles (11 km). Finally, in 1921, it abandoned the stretch between Kalkaska and Rapid City, removing the last vestige of the Grand Rapids, Kalkaska and Southeastern.
