= Chicago and West Michigan Railway =

Railway in Michigan

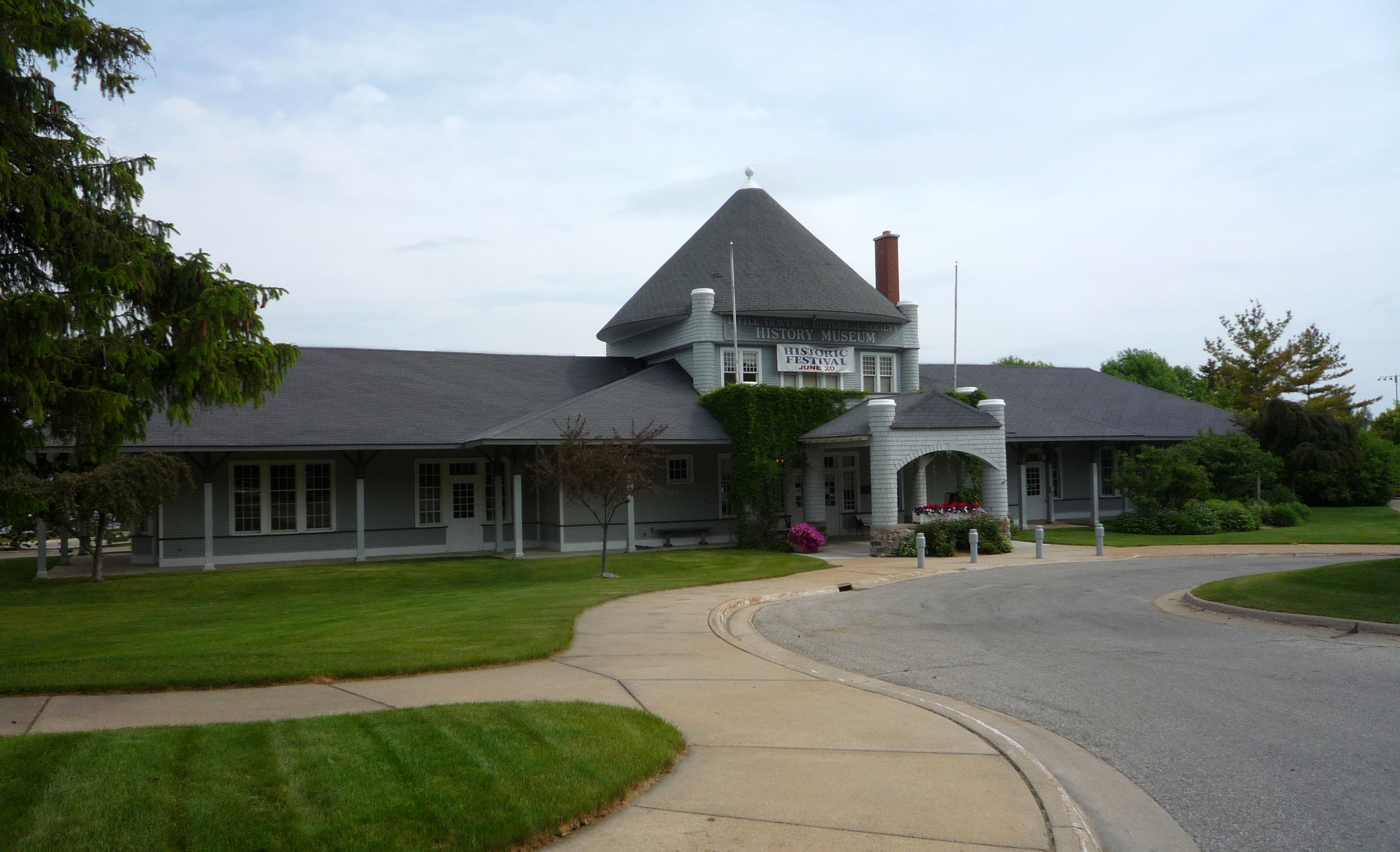
The Little Traverse History Museum, housed in the former Chicago and West Michigan Railroad depot (also the Chesapeake and Ohio Railway Station), Petoskey, Michigan, USA.

The Chicago and West Michigan Railway (C&WM) is a defunct railroad which operated in the state of Michigan between 1881 and 1899. It was one of the three companies which merged to become the Pere Marquette Railway.

The C&WM was formed on October 1, 1881, through the consolidation of the Chicago and West Michigan Railroad, the Grand Rapids, Newaygo and Lake Shore Railroad, the Grand Haven Railroad and the Indiana and Michigan Railroad.

== Network ==
At its creation in 1881, the C&WM controlled the following lines, comprising 353.6 miles (569.1 km):

Line	Length	Original company	Notes
New Buffalo–Holland–Muskegon–Pentwater	169.5 miles (272.8 km)	Chicago & West Michigan (C&WM) and Grand Haven (GH)	
Holland–Grand Rapids–White Cloud	70 miles (110 km)	C&WM and Grand Rapids, Newaygo & Lake Shore (GRN&LS)	
Allegan–Holland	23 miles (37 km)	GH	
Muskegon–Big Rapids	51.2 miles (82.4 km)	GH	
Mears–Hart	3.3 miles (5.3 km)	C&WM	Branched south of Pentwater
Fruitport–Muskegon	13.5 miles (21.7 km)	Grand Rapids & Lake Shore (C&MLS)	
White Cloud–Bitely	17 miles (27 km)	White River (WR)	Leased

The C&WM's first new line was a 37-mile (60 km) extension south from New Buffalo to La Crosse, Indiana, which opened in November 1882. In 1884 the C&WM bought the White River Railroad, which it had previously leased, which controlled a 29.86-mile (48.06 km) line from White Cloud to Baldwin (where it joined the Flint & Pere Marquette). In 1890 the C&WM extended the line north from Baldwin another 74 miles (119 km) to Traverse City. On February 28, 1891, the C&WM created the Chicago and North Michigan to extend the line an additional 78.5 miles (126.3 km) to Bay View, a task it completed on July 17, 1892; the company also built a 9.8-mile (15.8 km) branch line from Williamsburg to Elk Rapids.

In 1897 the C&WM entered into an arrangement with William Alden Smith to construct a railway line southeast from Rapid City through Kalkaska to northern Missaukee County. Alden's company, the Grand Rapids, Kalkaska and Southeastern Railroad, completed the road in 1898 and was leased by the C&WM starting the next year. The C&WM's successor, the Pere Marquette, formally consolidated the GRK&S in 1903.

In 1899 the C&WM consolidated with the Flint and Pere Marquette Railway and the Detroit, Grand Rapids and Western Railroad to form the Pere Marquette Railway. However, the conveyance of the Indiana property was later declared invalid, and the C&WM continued to exist as a non-operating subsidiary in that state until March 12, 1917, at the same time as the Pere Marquette Railway took over the Pere Marquette Railroad.

Today, only the lines from New Buffalo to Holland, Holland to Hamilton, Grand Rapids to Ludington, Walhalla to Manistee, and Grawn to Williamsburg remain in use, with the rest of the track torn out, most of it being dismantled between 1982 and 1983 when the Chesapeake and Ohio Railway abandoned a lot of its former C&WM trackage.
