= White River Railroad =

White River Railroad or White River Railway could refer to:

- White River Railway (Arkansas), 1901–1903, predecessor of the Missouri Pacific Railroad
- White River Railway (Indiana), owned by Kingan & Company
- White River Railroad (Michigan), a subsidiary of the Chicago and West Michigan Railway
- White River Railway (Missouri)
- White River Railroad (Vermont)
