= Helena Township, Michigan =

- Civil township
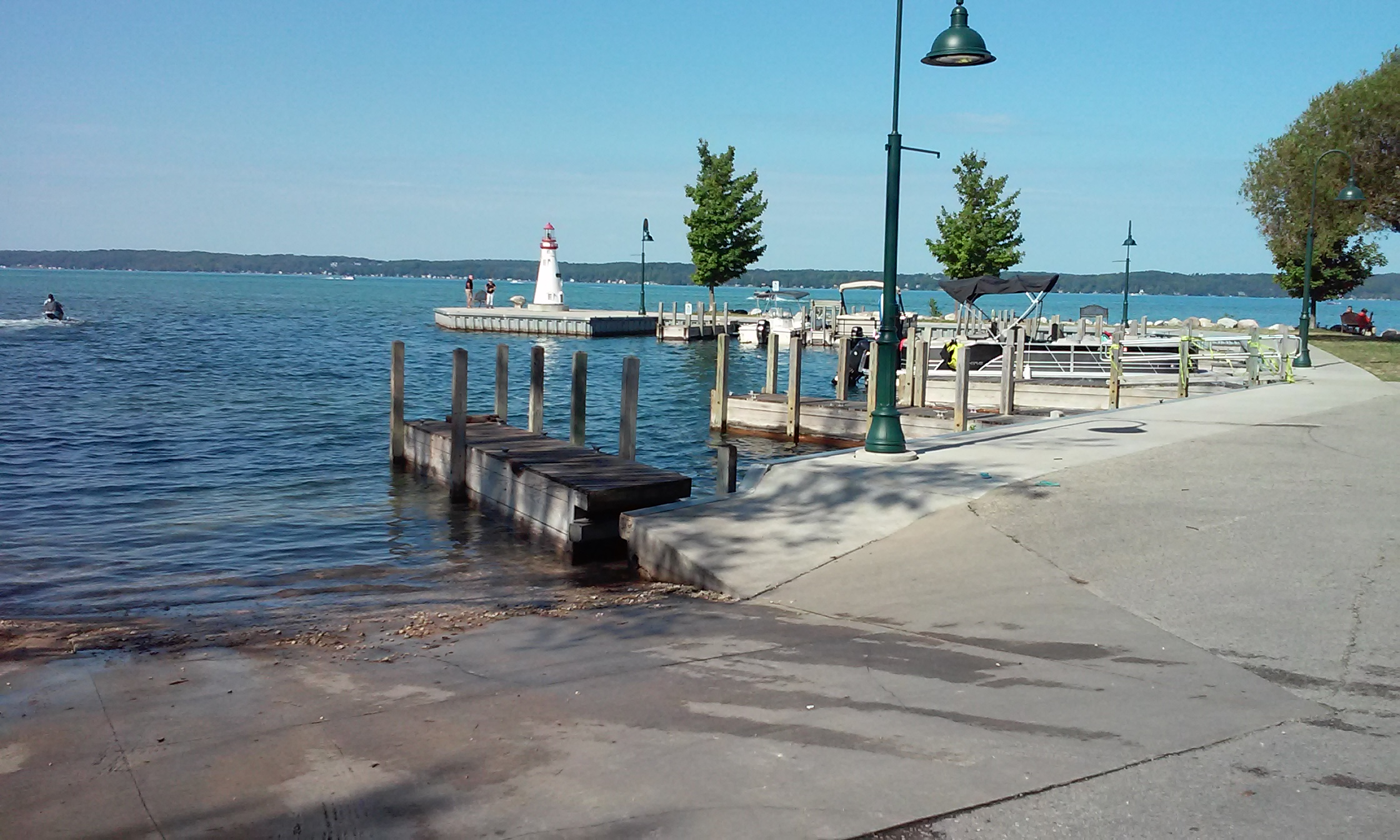

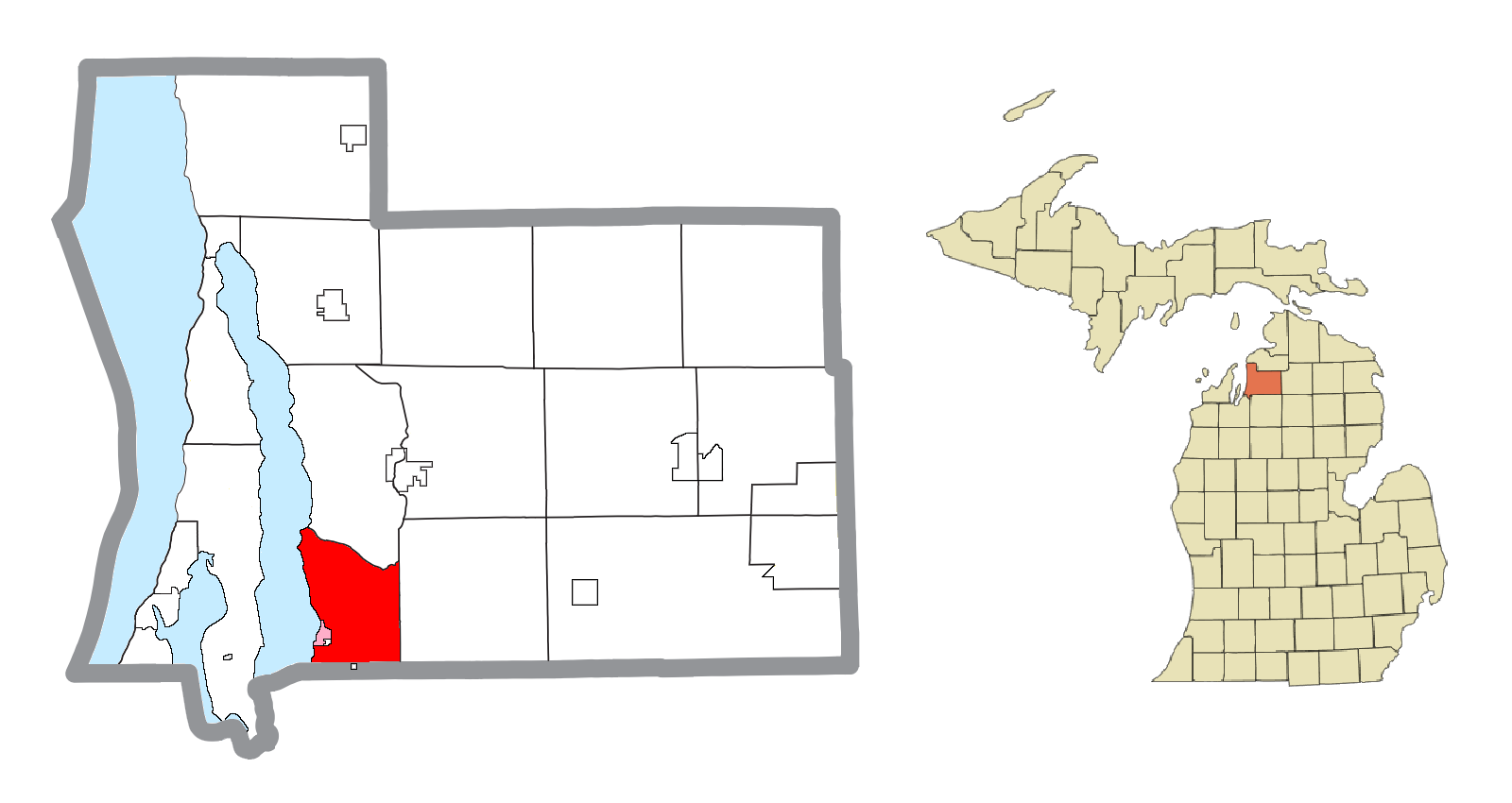
- Location within Antrim County (red) and the administered community of Alden (pink)

- Location within the state of Michigan Helena Township (the United States)
- Coordinates: 44°53′44″N 85°15′43″W
- Country: United States
- State: Michigan
- County: Antrim
- Established: 1865

Government
  - Supervisor: Butch Peeples
  - Clerk: Oryana Leffew

Area
  - Total: 23.1 sq mi (59.7 km^{2})
  - Land: 16.2 sq mi (42.0 km^{2})
  - Water: 6.9 sq mi (17.8 km^{2})
- Elevation: 696 ft (212 m)

Population (2020)
  - Total: 937
  - Density: 57.8/sq mi (22.3/km^{2})
- Time zone: UTC-5 (Eastern (EST))
  - Summer (DST): UTC-4 (EDT)
- ZIP code(s): 49612 (Alden); 49615 (Bellaire)
- Area code: 231
- FIPS code: 26-37500
- GNIS feature ID: 1626461
- Website: Official website

Helena Township is a civil township of Antrim County in the U.S. state of Michigan. The population was 937 at the 2020 census. Helena Township was organized in 1865 by a division of Milton Township. It was named for Helena M. Thayer, who was from the first family to settle on the southern shore of Clam Lake. Thayer Lake in the township is also named for the family.

== History ==
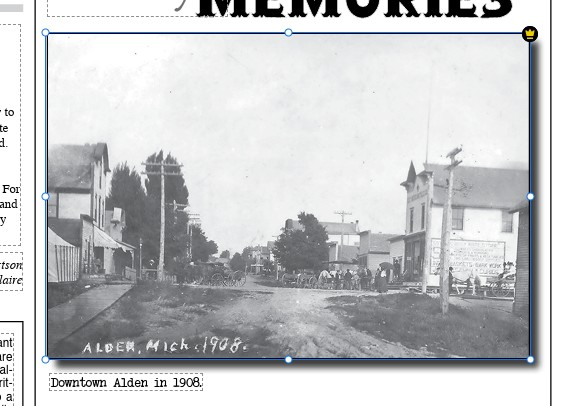
Old Alden - Michigan

Helena Township was organized in 1865 following a division of Milton Township. The township was named for Helena M. Thayer, a member of the first family to settle along the southern shore of Clam Lake, now known as Torch Lake. Thayer Lake within the township is also named for the family.

== Communities ==
- Alden is an unincorporated community in the township on the southeast end of Torch Lake. The Alden ZIP code 49612 serves most of southwest Helena Township.
- Clam River is a community on Torch Lake in the north of the township.
- Comfort was a station on the Pere Marquette Railroad. There was a post office here starting in 1913.
- Grand Traverse Band of Ottawa and Chippewa Indians has two separate locations within Helena Township.

== Geography ==
According to the United States Census Bureau, the township has a total area of 23.1 square miles (59.7 km^{2}), of which 16.2 square miles (42.0 km^{2}) is land and 6.9 square miles (17.8 km^{2}), or 29.74%, is water.

== Demographics ==
As of the census of 2000, there were 878 people, 408 households, and 281 families residing in the township. The population density was 54.0 inhabitants per square mile (20.8/km^{2}). There were 801 housing units at an average density of 49.3 per square mile (19.0/km^{2}). The racial makeup of the township was 97.15% White, 0.11% African American, 0.91% Native American, 0.46% Asian, and 1.37% from two or more races. Hispanic or Latino of any race were 0.34% of the population.

There were 408 households, out of which 19.4% had children under the age of 18 living with them, 58.3% were married couples living together, 5.4% had a female householder with no husband present, and 31.1% were non-families. 28.2% of all households were made up of individuals, and 10.5% had someone living alone who was 65 years of age or older. The average household size was 2.15 and the average family size was 2.57.

In the township the population was spread out, with 16.6% under the age of 18, 4.8% from 18 to 24, 21.4% from 25 to 44, 34.7% from 45 to 64, and 22.4% who were 65 years of age or older. The median age was 49 years. For every 100 females, there were 104.2 males. For every 100 females age 18 and over, there were 104.5 males.

The median income for a household in the township was $40,096, and the median income for a family was $49,732. Males had a median income of $33,542 versus $22,083 for females. The per capita income for the township was $24,948. About 3.0% of families and 6.9% of the population were below the poverty line, including 7.1% of those under age 18 and 5.7% of those age 65 or over.
