= Lilley Township, Michigan =

- Township
- Location within the state of Michigan Lilley Township, Michigan (the United States)
- Coordinates: 43°46′28″N 85°51′7″W
- Country: United States
- State: Michigan
- County: Newaygo

Area
  - Total: 35.6 sq mi (92.1 km^{2})
  - Land: 34.5 sq mi (89.3 km^{2})
  - Water: 1.1 sq mi (2.8 km^{2})
- Elevation: 876 ft (267 m)

Population (2020)
  - Total: 835
  - Density: 24.2/sq mi (9.35/km^{2})
- Time zone: UTC-5 (Eastern (EST))
  - Summer (DST): UTC-4 (EDT)
- FIPS code: 26-47440
- GNIS feature ID: 1626615
- Website: https://lilleytownship.com/

Lilley Township is a civil township of Newaygo County in the U.S. state of Michigan. The population was 835 at the 2020 census.

The unincorporated communities of Bitely and Lilley are within the township.

== Geography ==
According to the United States Census Bureau, the township has a total area of 35.6 square miles (92 km^{2}), of which 34.5 square miles (89 km^{2}) is land and 1.1 square miles (2.8 km^{2}) (3.06%) is water.

== Demographics ==
As of the census of 2000, there were 788 people, 342 households, and 228 families residing in the township. The population density was 22.9 inhabitants per square mile (8.8/km^{2}). There were 1,024 housing units at an average density of 29.7 per square mile (11.5/km^{2}). The racial makeup of the township was 94.67% White, 1.78% African American, 1.40% Native American, 0.13% Asian, 0.13% from other races, and 1.90% from two or more races. Hispanic or Latino of any race were 1.02% of the population.

There were 342 households, out of which 24.3% had children under the age of 18 living with them, 55.8% were married couples living together, 6.1% had a female householder with no husband present, and 33.3% were non-families. 27.8% of all households were made up of individuals, and 12.9% had someone living alone who was 65 years of age or older. The average household size was 2.30 and the average family size was 2.76.

In the township the population was spread out, with 22.2% under the age of 18, 5.3% from 18 to 24, 23.4% from 25 to 44, 29.9% from 45 to 64, and 19.2% who were 65 years of age or older. The median age was 44 years. For every 100 females, there were 103.6 males. For every 100 females age 18 and over, there were 111.4 males.

The median income for a household in the township was $25,870, and the median income for a family was $26,700. Males had a median income of $29,125 versus $16,458 for females. The per capita income for the township was $12,765. About 16.8% of families and 20.2% of the population were below the poverty line, including 30.0% of those under age 18 and 2.9% of those age 65 or over.
