= Grand Rapids, Newaygo and Lake Shore Railroad =

Railway line in Michigan, United States

Grand Rapids, Newaygo & Lake Shore
Overview
- Headquarters: Grand Rapids, Michigan
- Locale: Western Michigan
- Dates of operation: 1869–1881
- Successor: Chicago & West Michigan

Technical
- Track gauge: 4 ft 8 1/2 in (1,435 mm) standard gauge
- Length: 46 miles (74 km)

The Grand Rapids, Newaygo and Lake Shore Railroad is a defunct railroad which operated in the state of Michigan between 1872 and 1881. The GRN&LS was chartered on September 11, 1869, under the leadership of David P. Clay. The company operated a 46-mile (74 km) line between Grand Rapids and White Cloud (where it joined the Chicago & Michigan Lake Shore). The initial segment, from Grand Rapids to Sparta, was completed on May 19, 1872. The line reached Newaygo on September 11, 1872; the first passenger train between the two towns ran the same day, to much fanfare from the local populace. On September 24, 1875, the line was extended over the Muskegon River to White Cloud. On September 30, 1881, it consolidated with other companies to form the Chicago & West Michigan. During its twelve years of independent existence the company sustained a net loss of $36,554.28.
