= William Alden Smith =

American politician (1859-1932)

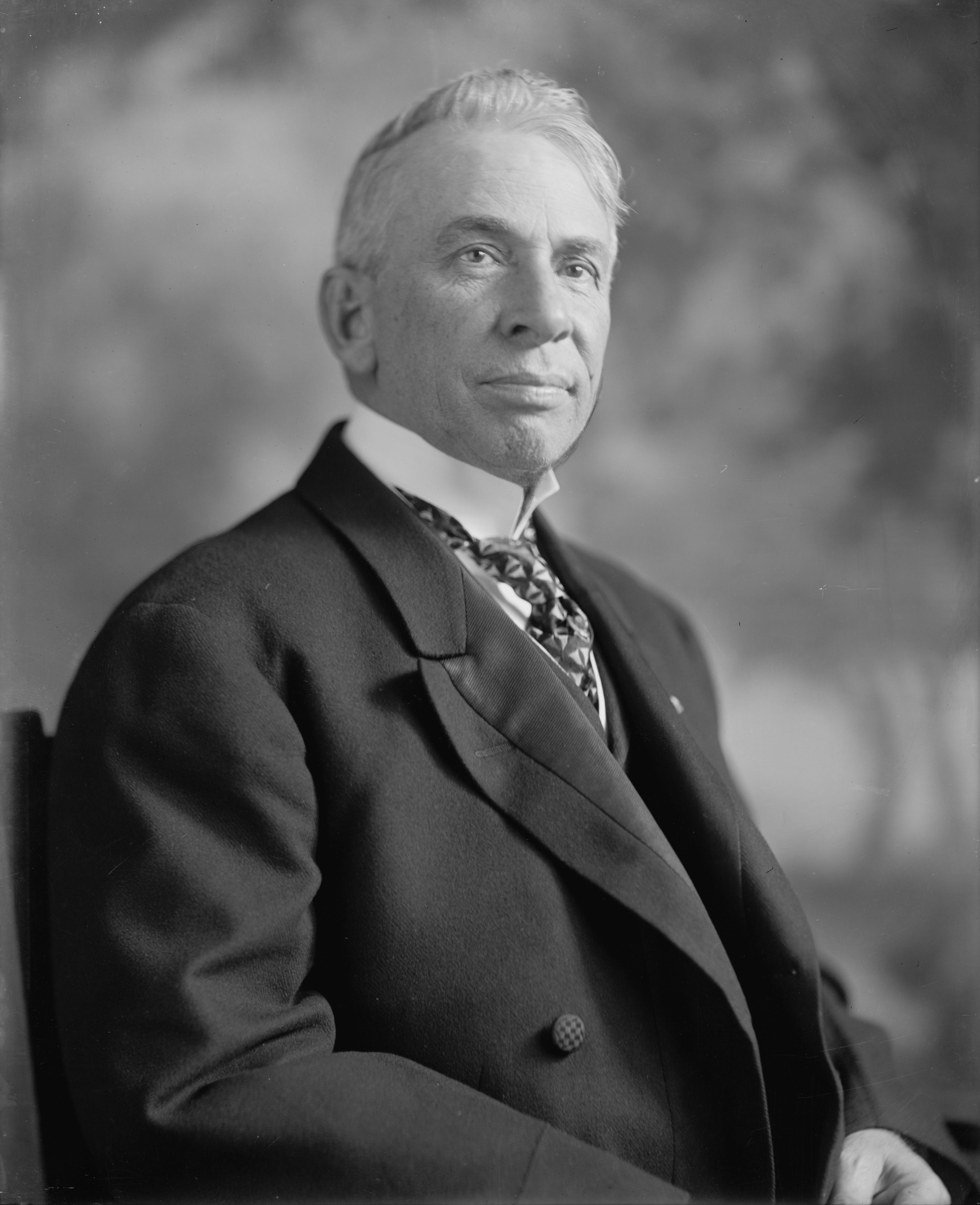

United States Senator from Michigan
- In office February 9, 1907 – March 3, 1919
- Preceded by: Russell A. Alger
- Succeeded by: Truman H. Newberry

Member of the U.S. House of Representatives from Michigan's 5th district
- In office March 4, 1895 – February 9, 1907
- Preceded by: George F. Richardson
- Succeeded by: Gerrit J. Diekema

Personal details
- Born: May 12, 1859 Dowagiac, Michigan, U.S.
- Died: October 11, 1932 (aged 73) Grand Rapids, Michigan, U.S.
- Party: Republican
- Spouse: Nancy Alice Osterhout (m. 1886)
- Children: William Alden Smith, Jr.

William Alden Smith (May 12, 1859 – October 11, 1932) was a U.S. representative and U.S. senator from the state of Michigan. After the 1912 sinking of the Titanic, Smith chaired the Senate hearings into the disaster. His report led to major reforms in maritime safety.

== Early life and early career ==
Smith was born in Dowagiac, Michigan to George Richardson and Leah Margaret (Allen) Smith and attended the common schools. He moved with his parents to Grand Rapids in 1872, where he attended school, sold popcorn, and was a newsboy and messenger boy. He was appointed a page in the Michigan House of Representatives in 1875 (or 1879) at Lansing, Michigan. He studied law in the office of Burch & Montgomery (Marsden C. Burch was a one-time U.S. Attorney for the Western District of Michigan) and was admitted to the bar in 1882. Smith practiced law alone for some time, but later became associated with Fredrick W. Stevens. This firm afterwards became Smiley, Smith & Stevens. He was general counsel of the Chicago and West Michigan Railway and the Detroit, Lansing and Northern Railroad. While in this practice, Smith became an expert on railroad law and finance. He was assistant secretary of the Michigan Senate in 1883 and the State Game Warden from 1887 to 1891, reportedly the first salaried state game warden in the nation. He was a member of the Republican State Central Committee from 1888 to 1892.

== House of Representatives ==
Smith was elected as a Republican from the Michigan's 5th congressional district to the 54th United States Congress and to the six succeeding Congresses, serving from March 4, 1895, until his resignation, effective February 9, 1907, having been elected to the U.S. Senate. While in the House of Representatives, Smith was chairman of the Committee on Expenditures in the State Department in the 56th Congress, the Committee on Pacific Railroads in the 57th and 58th Congresses. While Chairman of the Committee on Pacific Railroads, Smith was a leading advocate for universal safety standards on railroads, attracting the ire of many of the country's railroad executives.

== Senate ==
Smith was elected as a Republican to the United States Senate on January 15, 1907, for the term beginning March 4, 1907. He was subsequently elected on February 6, 1907, to fill the vacancy in the term ending March 3, 1907, caused by the death of Russell A. Alger. He was reelected in 1913 and served from February 9, 1907, to March 3, 1919. He declined to run for renomination in 1918. Smith was chairman of the Committee on Canadian Relations in the 61st Congress, the Committee on Territories in the 62nd Congress, and the Select Committee to Examine Branches of the Civil Service in the 63rd through 65th Congresses.

== RMS Titanic investigation ==
After the brand new White Star liner RMS Titanic sank in the North Atlantic on April 15, 1912, with more than 1,500 lives lost, Smith chaired Senate hearings that began at the Waldorf-Astoria Hotel in New York City the day after the survivors landed. Senators and spectators heard dramatic testimony from the surviving passengers and crew. Smith's subcommittee issued a report on May 28 that led to significant reforms in international maritime safety. Smith achieved some notoriety for being more colorful than knowledgeable, even being called "Watertight Smith" by the British press for asking whether watertight compartments, actually meant to keep the ship afloat, were meant to shelter passengers. In addition to this, he continually interrupted witnesses, and asked questions they had already answered or about events they were not present for. In one of his more redundant questions, Smith asked the ship's fifth officer Harold Lowe what an iceberg was made of, which Lowe responded with, "Ice, I suppose sir?".

In "The Titanic Chronicles", a 1999 television documentary about the senate hearings, he was voiced by David Garrison. In "Unsinkable" the 2024 movie Sen. William Alden Smith was portrayed by Cotter Smith.

== Other activities ==
Smith constructed the Grand Rapids, Kalkaska and Southeastern Railroad in Michigan in 1897 and became owner of the Lowell and Hastings Railroad in 1900. In June 1901, he was honored with the degree of Master of Arts by Dartmouth College. He was owner and publisher of the Grand Rapids Herald in 1906 and chairman of the board of directors of the Goodrich Company, which owned the Graham and Morton Steamship Line, the largest operator of steamboats from Chicago to various Lake Michigan ports.

In 1909 he defended Federal employee and civil rights activist Robert Pelham Jr. who was arrested when gathering information from witnesses after a black woman was beaten by a white police officer who was arresting her. Pelham was acquitted in the case.

Smith was married on October 21, 1886, to Nancy Alice ("Nana") Osterhout (October 21, 1859 – February 15, 1936) of Grand Rapids. They had one son, William Alden Smith, Jr. who died on April 19, 1920, at the age of 27. The second Disabled American Veterans chapter ever organized was in Kentwood, Michigan, and is named for him. The younger Smith was married to Marie McRae, daughter of Milton A. McRae of Detroit. This couple had a son, William Alden, III, who died on December 16, 1968, in San Diego, California at the age of 52. They are all buried in the family mausoleum at Woodlawn Cemetery, Grand Rapids, Michigan.

== Death and legacy ==
Smith died in Grand Rapids on October 11, 1932 and is interred in Woodlawn Cemetery there.

The community of Alden, Michigan is named for him. A bronze statue of Smith was placed in Grand Rapids in 2017, as part of the city's Community Legends Project, which seeks to build statues honoring prominent Grand Rapids figures.

== Portrayals ==
- Hans Korte (1984) - Titanic - Nachspiel einer Katastrophe (German TV film)
- David Garrison (1999) The Titanic Chronicles (Documentary)
- Martin Wimbush (2023) – Fred (short film)
- Cotter Smith (2024) - Unsinkable (Film)

== Bibliography ==
- Wade, Wyn Craig, The Titanic: End of a Dream, Penguin Books, 1986 ISBN 0-14-016691-2
- Wade, Wyn Craig. "The Senator and the Shipwreck." Michigan History 63 (November/December 1979): 10-19.
- Kuntz, Tom. The Titanic Disaster Hearings. Pocket, 1998. ISBN 0-671-02553-8

U.S. House of Representatives
Preceded by George F. Richardson	Member of the U.S. House of Representatives from Michigan's 5th congressional district 1895–1907	Succeeded by Gerrit J. Diekema
U.S. Senate
Preceded by Russell A. Alger	U.S. senator (Class 2) from Michigan; 1907–1919; Served alongside: Julius C. Burrows, Charles E. Townsend	Succeeded by Truman H. Newberry
