= Rapid River (Kalkaska County, Michigan) =

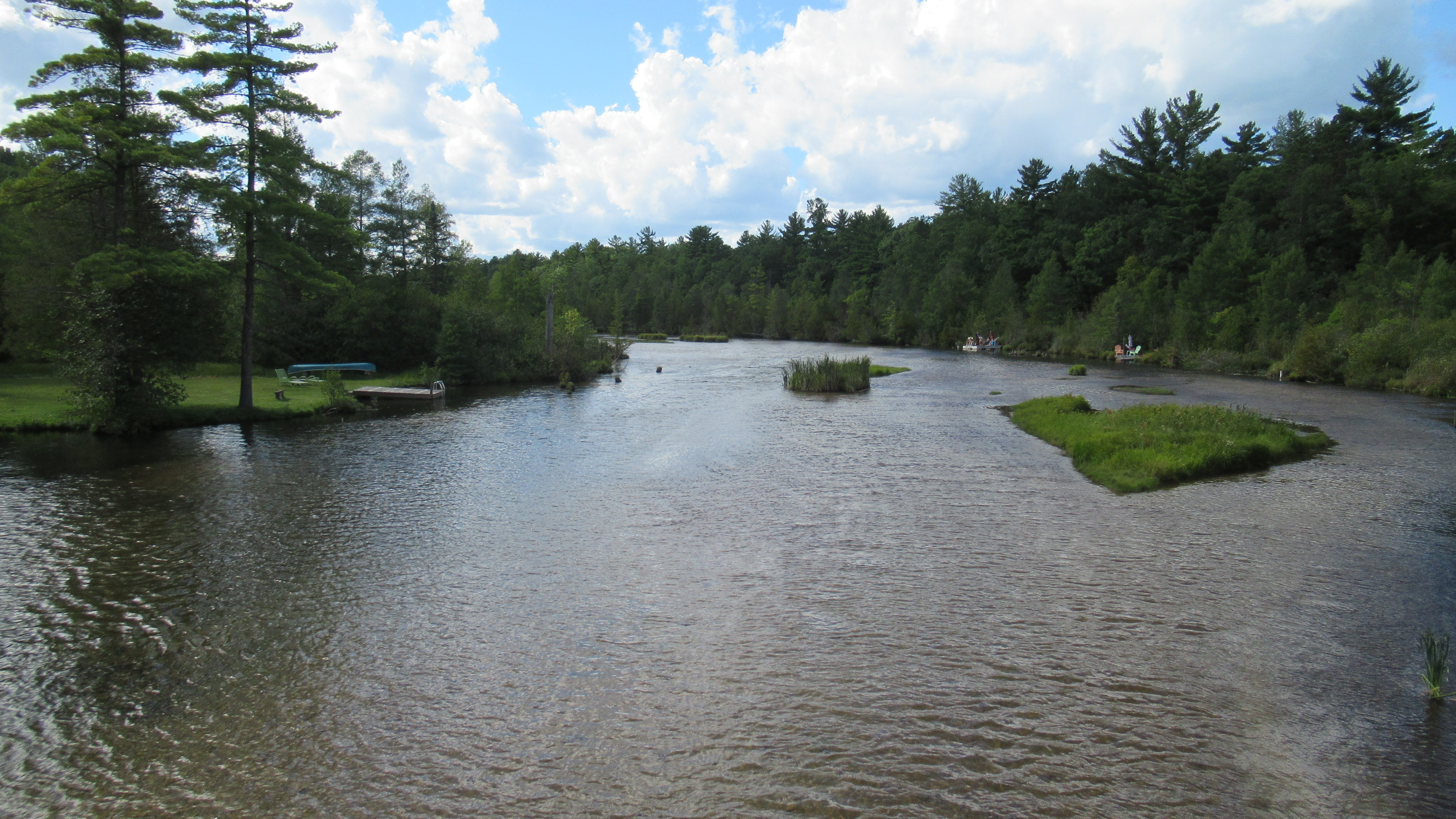
- View of the river from NW Aarwood Road

- Location within the state of Michigan

Location
- Country: USA
- State: Michigan
- Region: Northern Michigan
- County: Kalkaska County

Physical characteristics
- Source
  - location: Cold Springs Township, Kalkaska County, Michigan
  - coordinates: 44°50′19″N 85°4′29″W
- Mouth: Torch River
  - location: Torch River, Kalkaska County, Michigan
  - coordinates: 44°50′44″N 85°19′21″W

Rapid River is a 17.0-mile-long (27.4 km) river in Kalkaska County in the U.S. state of Michigan. The river empties into the Torch River at the community of Torch River just south of Torch Lake.

== See also ==
- List of rivers of Michigan
- Elk River Chain of Lakes Watershed
