= Williamsburg, Michigan =

- Unincorporated community
- Looking west along Old State Hwy 72

- Location within the state of Michigan Location within the United States
- Coordinates: 44°46′25″N 85°24′14″W
- Country: United States
- State: Michigan
- County: Grand Traverse
- Township: Whitewater
- Settled: 1856
- Elevation: 735 ft (224 m)
- Time zone: UTC-5 (Eastern (EST))
  - Summer (DST): UTC-4 (EDT)
- ZIP code(s): 49690
- Area code: 231
- GNIS feature ID: 1616512

U.S. Post Office in Williamsburg

Road signage along M-72

Williamsburg is an unincorporated community in Grand Traverse County the U.S. state of Michigan. The community is located in Whitewater Township and is home to the Turtle Creek Casino and Hotel.

As an unincorporated community, Williamsburg has no legally defined boundaries or population statistics of its own but does have its own post office with the 49690 ZIP Code.

== History ==
=== Indigenous peoples ===
There is evidence that three different cultures of people have lived in this area since 10,500 BC, especially on Skegemog Point in Lake Skegemog and Elk Lake. Records show that a branch of the Algonquin people, known as the Mascoutin, lived in the area until around 1630s. Later, the area was home to Odawa and Ojibwe peoples.

=== Early settlement ===
In 1856, three families from Monroe County, New York, settled the area, and called it Mill Creek. In 1867, the community was given a post office, named Dunbar, after its first postmaster. The post office was renamed to Williamsburgh in 1869, and the "h" was later dropped in 1894.

In 1892, an extension of the Chicago and West Michigan Railroad opened through Williamsburg. In 1982, the rail line, which had previously extended to Charlevoix and Petoskey, was terminated at Williamsburg.

=== Natural gas eruption ===
Shortly before the 1973 oil crisis, President Richard Nixon authorized a substantial increase in the extraction of domestic crude oil production in a bid to make the United States energy independent. Subsequently, land south of Williamsburg, located within the Pere Marquette State Forest, was sold to Standard Oil of Indiana, operating under the name Amoco.

On April 19, 1973, Amoco well E1-22 had inadvertently struck a pocket of high pressure natural gas. The gas began to seep into the surrounding rock, following the pathways of natural springs in the area. The drilling team was not immediately aware of their incursion into the well. Initially, workers simply covered any geysers with mud, hoping more gas did not seep out. After several days, workers finally began pouring concrete to seal well E1-22.

Some 100 to 150 geysers began to appear for miles around the well site. These geysers produced sinkholes up to 25 feet (7.6 m) wide and 15 feet (4.6 m) deep. Disturbed sediments began working their way into nearby water, notably Elk Lake and Grand Traverse Bay. These sediments turned the usually pristine northern waters into a rich brown muck. William K. Stevens of The New York Times described the waters as follows:

The gas eruptions, pushing clay ahead of them, have caused tons of silt to flow into Acme and Williamsburg Creeks, two trout streams here, and thence into Elk Lake and Grand Traverse Bay, an inlet of Lake Michigan. Viewed from the air, the slugs of silt send sharply defined whorls of ugly, chalky water swirling out into the normally clear turquoise of the lakes. There were fears that the silting might cause ecological damage in the creeks if it lasted long, but state officials said no apparent damage had occurred yet.

According to a United Press International report from April 20, 1973, "The town hall was on the verge of toppling today as gaseous, bubbling craters popped open threatening a massive gas eruption," and "The earth around town hall is almost completely eaten up... It is less than a foot from surrounding the entire foundation."

A blockade was enforced by Michigan State Police, who patrolled the area on horseback for fear that the engines within their cars could ignite the natural gas within the air and cause the entire exclusion zone to explode. This same fear also restricted many photojournalists, as they were unable to bring in cameras for fear that their flash could ignite the gas cloud as well. Because of this, few pictures exist of both the geysers and the sinkholes. Approximately 400 residents were evacuated. Most residents complied with the evacuation request, although as the gas was invisible and odorless, some residents refused to believe that there was a threat. Residents who did not comply with evacuation teams were eventually barred from re-entry into the exclusion zone once they left for things like groceries or work. Famously, one of the residents had abandoned their pet Peacock, who stubbornly perched in a tree. The recently finished M-72 was heavily damaged after the sinkholes ripped apart the aggregate base of the roads, leading to sections collapsing in on themselves.

Then resident Earl Gay was quoted by The New York Times as saying the following when asked if he was scared for his safety:

Yes, And I am yet, as far as that's concerned. You figure you're going to lose everything. The people here are not calm, but they're trying not to get hysterical to the point where they can't do anything.

The well was plugged by April 25. Some residents would be returned to their homes in just a few days after the well was plugged, others were not permitted to return for several months on end. A class action lawsuit was filed by many residents, who settled the matter with Amoco. After the event, the Michigan Department of Natural Resources began requiring intermediate casings on wells to prevent leakage similar to what was seen in Williamsburg. Well E1-22 Was reopened in 1976 after the DNR deemed the site safe to resume activities. The well is currently abandoned and owned by BP America Production Company.

== Geography ==
Williamsburg is located in the northern Lower Peninsula of Michigan. The community lies about 8 miles (13 km) south of Elk Rapids, about 10 miles (16 km) east of Traverse City, and about 12 miles (19 km) west of Kalkaska. The community is adjacent to a portion of the Grand Traverse Reservation, at which the Turtle Creek Casino and Hotel operates.

=== Major highway ===
- M-72 runs east–west directly through the town, providing access to Traverse City and Kalkaska.

== Notable resident ==
- Adam Trautman, National Football League (NFL) tight end, grew up in Williamsburg.
