= White River Railroad (Michigan) =

Railroad in Michigan

Overview
- Headquarters: Muskegon, Grand Rapids and Boston (Note: A wholly owned subsidiary of the C&WM, the White River had no independent corporate governance.)
- Locale: Newaygo County, Michigan and Lake County, Michigan
- Dates of operation: 1879–1884
- Successor: Chicago & West Michigan

Technical
- Track gauge: 4 ft 8 1/2 in (1,435 mm) standard gauge
- Length: 29.86 miles (48.06 km)

The White River Railroad was a wholly owned subsidiary of the Chicago and West Michigan Railroad incorporated on November 13, 1879, for the purpose of constructing a rail link north from the C&WM's line at White Cloud to the Flint and Pere Marquette Railroad's main line (Ludington–Monroe) at Baldwin, and to exploit the ample timber resources of the White River area. On April 1, 1880, the White River opened a 13-mile (21 km) line from White Cloud north to Merrill Township, in Newaygo County. (Note: It is unclear precisely where the line stopped. Sources suggest the following candidates: Troy, Mud Lake and Crooked Lake. As of 2008 there remains a railway line between White Cloud and Baldwin, which by a map of the Pere Marquette from 1921 demonstrably passes through Ramona and Bitely. This must be the line built by the White River, but the only named location that distance from White Cloud is Woodland Park, which lies on the shores of two small lakes: Woodland Lake and East Lake.) In 1881 the line was extended a further 4 miles (6.4 km) to what would become Bitely in 1889. (Note: The Michigan Railroad Commission's report from 1883 indicates this as New Troy, but there is no New Troy in Newaygo County. The 1885 report calls it "West Troy." Bitely is the correct distance from White Cloud. Meints is silent on the extension, while Ivey repeats the "New Troy" claim. The most likely explanation is that "New Troy" was renamed.) In either late 1883 or no later than February 7, 1884, the White River completed the line all the way to Baldwin, for a total length of 29.86 miles (48.06 km). (Note: Ivey claims 1883, but the Annual Report for that year gives the White River's mileage as 17 miles, the same as the year before. In 1884 the C&WM bought the White River outright, and its Annual Report for that year reflects a total mileage of 29.86 miles.)

On the completion of the first segment of the line in 1880 the C&WM had leased the White River for a period of 999 years (effectively in perpetuity). When in 1881 the C&WM reorganized as the Chicago and West Michigan Railway this arrangement continued. The annual reports filed to the Michigan Railroad Commission listed the White River's trackage with the C&WM; under the White River's own report appeared the banner "Controlled and Operated by the Chicago & West Michigan Railway Company." Finally, on February 7, 1884, the C&WM bought the White River, and it ceased to exist as an independent company. During its short operating history the White River turned a profit, due in large part to lumber revenues; the company issued a dividend in 1882 and never floated a bond, which was unusual for a construction railroad.

The White Cloud–Baldwin line survived the cutbacks of the 20th century and as of 2011 is operated by Marquette Rail, a short-line railroad which leased CSX Transportation's Ludington and Manistee Subdivisions on November 12, 2005. Among other commodities, the Marquette Rail hauls paperboard, continuing the White River's old purpose as a lumber road.
