= Turtle Creek Casino and Hotel =

Casino and hotel in the United States

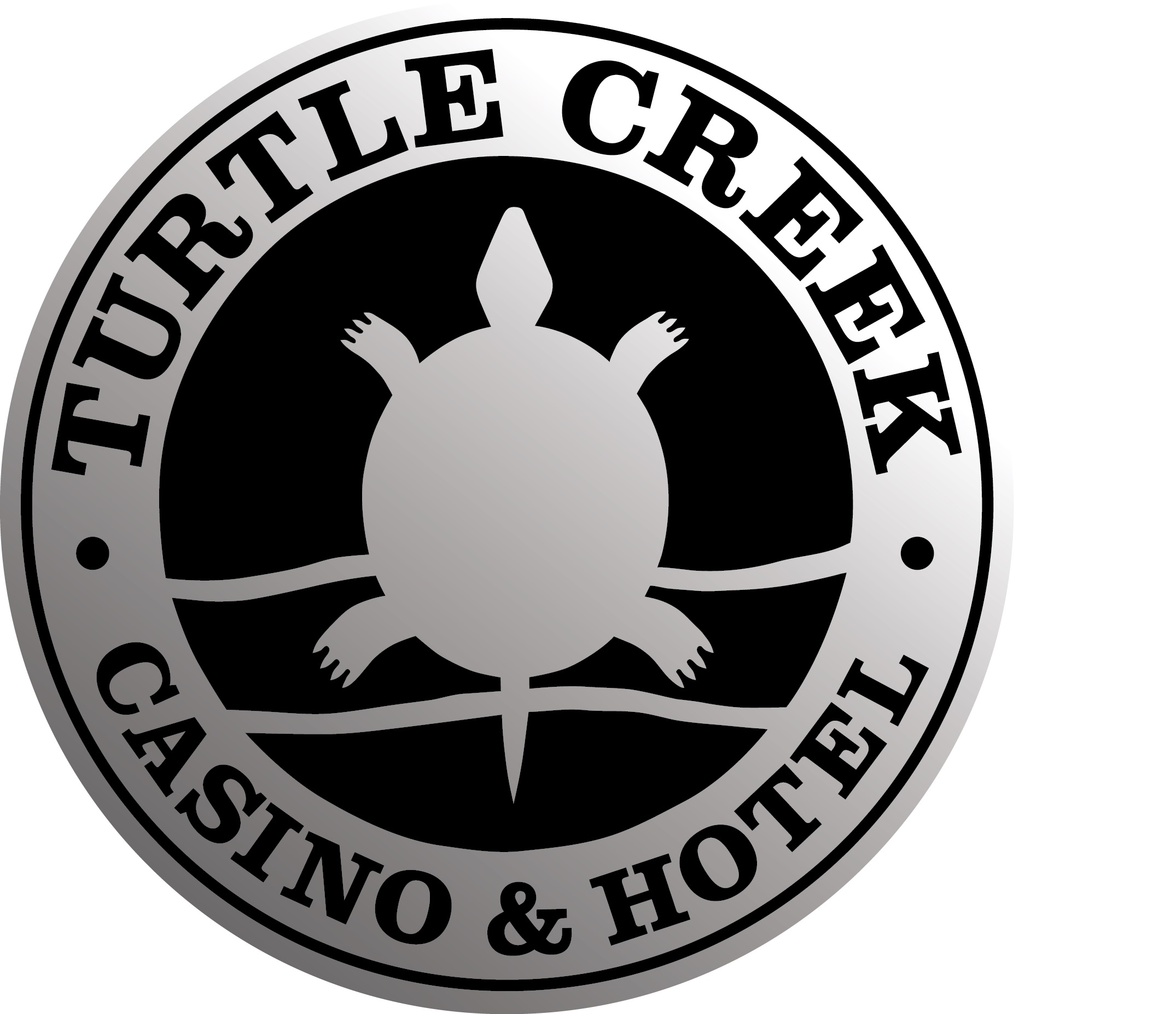
- Interactive map of Turtle Creek Casino and Hotel
- Location: 7741 M-72 East Williamsburg, Michigan; 44.7726°N 85.4180°W
- No. of rooms: 160
- Owner: Grand Traverse Band of Ottawa and Chippewa Indians
- Website: turtlecreekcasino.com

The Turtle Creek Casino and Hotel is located in Williamsburg, Michigan. The Grand Traverse Band of Ottawa and Chippewa Indians own the casino and resort.
