= Lester Dragstedt =

American surgeon

- Born: Lester Reynold Dragstedt; October 2, 1893; Anaconda, Montana, US
- Died: July 16, 1975 (aged 81); Elk Lake, Michigan, US
- Occupation: Surgeon
- Years active: 1920s–1970s
- Known for: First surgeon to successfully separate conjoined twins
- Medical career
- Institutions: University of Chicago, University of Florida

Lester Reynold Dragstedt (2 October 1893 – 16 July 1975) was an American surgeon who was the first to successfully separate conjoined twins. He was considered nationally known, and a leading authority on ulcers and gastroneuro surgery.

== Early life and education ==
Lester Reynold Dragstedt was born in Anaconda, Montana, to Swedish emigrant parents. His younger brother, Carl Albert, also became a doctor and surgeon. In his youth, his father encouraged him to memorize poetry including Bible passages and fragments of famous speeches. He was valedictorian of his high school and was offered a scholarship to schools including the University of Chicago. Swedish physiologist Anton Julius Carlson was a long-time friend of the Dragstedts who was the local Lutheran minister but started teaching physiology at the University of Chicago and encouraged the Dragstedts to "send the boy to Chicago. They will found out in three months if he has any brains, and if he does not, you can bring him back to Anaconda and put him to work in the copper smelter". In the beginning, Dragstedt thought of becoming a physicist after hearing lectures by Robert Andrews Millikan but was later influenced by physicians Ivan Pavlov and Michel Latarjet. However, he was especially influenced by A. J. Carlson, whom he would consider a mentor and advisor throughout his career, and Dragstedt pursued his studies of physiology. Dragstedt became a talented operating surgeon after practicing with animals and was attracted to surgery but he felt physiology had "greater promise for innovative accomplishments".

He primarily studied at the University of Chicago, where he received his Bachelor of Science degree in 1915, Masters of Physiology in 1916, Ph.D of Physiology in 1920 and finally Doctor of Medicine the following year. In 1918, he met Gladys Shoesmith, a student at Iowa and later married her in 1922. In 1916, he started as a physiologist and instructor of pharmacology at University of Iowa before returning in 1919, after serving in the military during World War I. While at University of Chicago, he briefly worked as a teacher at Northwestern University in 1923.

In 1925, as a Rockefeller Fellow, Dragstedt traveled abroad where his daughter Charlotte was born; his travels included to Paris to study at Fritz de Quervain's clinic and Vienna with Anton Eiselsberg and at Vienna General Hospital with Jakob Erdheim and finally to Budapest with Eugen Pólya and at St. Rochus Hospital with Hümer Hültl. He paid each teacher $150 a month and returned to the United States where he was recruited in 1926 by Dallas B. Phemister to help design new research facilities for University of Chicago. After this, he was promoted to associate professor of surgery, eventually replacing Phemister as chair in 1947 and holding this position until his retirement in 1959 when he became professor emeritus.

=== Military training and health issues ===
In a 1971 letter, Dragstedt spoke of his time in the military, saying he went to Washington, D. C. after leaving Iowa to study typhoid vaccines at Army Medical School with Edward Bright Vedder. After growing tired of his activities, he transferred to Fort Leavenworth and subsequently to Yale with Milton Winternitz and then Camp Merritt which he called "my best experience in the Army" as he would perform autopsies from morning to night for about eight months. However, he contracted tuberculosis and spent nine months at a tuberculosis sanatorium in Arizona and later had a urinary tract examination. Surgeon Herman Kretschmer found that Dragstedt had a unilateral tuberculosis kidney which required a nephrectomy and Kretschmer and Dragstedt's brother Carl performed the surgery. In 1927, Dragstedt also survived a severe bout of typhoid fever which caused him to lose 50 pounds (23 kg). He was also hard of hearing throughout his life.

== Career ==
In 1936, he was one of three doctors from the University of Chicago's Department of Bacteriology, Surgery and Medicine who discovered a new germ, the apparent cause of ulcerative colitis.

He was particularly recognized for his contributions to the treatment of the pancreas, parathyroids and diseases of the stomach. He originated the skin-grafted ileostomy in the treatment of ulcerative colitis.

He developed a new surgical procedure (surgical vagotomy) for duodenal ulcers (resulting from peptic ulcer disease). He was a well-respected surgeon, renowned for his work on gastric and duodenal ulcers and his work was documented in over 360 articles published in several medical journals.

In 1950, he and his team at the University of Chicago discovered a new organ in the stomach, the antrum, which may play an important role in causing ulcers. The gastrin and stomach's secretions stimulate the flow of gastric juices and cause the stomach "digest" itself, causing the ulcers. The team discovered this while working with dogs and published their findings in the Society for Experimental Biology. They found that removal of the antrum noticeably reduced the flow of gastric juices. That same year, while at the University of Chicago, Dragstedt managed a program where music was mixed with anesthesia to help calm patients.

He considered his vagotomy surgical technique "the most important contribution of his career". In a 1971 news interview, he revealed that he always believed "knowledge was the most important legacy one generation could bequeath to the next", and when he once asked his classmates how long Earth would remain inhabitable and they responded two billion years, he chose teaching as his profession.

Following his Chicago retirement, he moved to Florida where he became a full-time physiology and research professor at University of Florida College of Medicine until his death of a heart attack in 1975 at his lake house near Elk Lake, Michigan. He was also a president of National Society for Medical Research. From 1964 to 1965, he was also a visiting professor at Marquette University Medical School (now Medical College of Wisconsin).

== Legacy ==
Since 1977, the UF College of Medicine Department of Surgery have held annual Lester R. Dragstedt Symposiums, named in his honour. The award "Lester R. Dragstedt Physician Scientist Award" was also named for him.

== Honors and distinctions ==
Degrees

- 1915 B.S., University of Chicago
- 1916 M.S., University of Chicago
- 1920 Ph.D., University of Chicago
- 1921 M.D., Rush Medical College, Chicago

Honorary Degrees

- 1953 Doctor Honoris Causa, University of Guadalajara, Mexico
- 1959 Docteur Honoris Causa, University of Lyon, France
- 1969 Sc.D., University of Florida, Gainesville
- 1973 Doctor Honoris Causa, University of Uppsala, Uppsala, Sweden

== Career ==
University Appointments

- 1916 Assistant, Department of Physiology, University of Chicago
- 1916–1917 Instructor, Pharmacology, State University of Iowa
- 1917–1919 Assistant Professor of Physiology, State University of Iowa
- 1920–1923 Assistant Professor of Physiology, University of Chicago
- 1923–1925 Professor and Head, Departments of Physiology and Pharmacology, Northwestern University
- 1925–1930 Associate Professor of Surgery, University of Chicago
- 1930–1948 Professor of Surgery, University of Chicago
- 1948–1959 Thomas D. Jones Distinguished Service Professor of Surgery and Chairman of the Department of Surgery, University of Chicago
- 1959–1975 Research Professor of Surgery, University of Florida, Gainesville

== Membership of organizations and societies ==
American Organizations and Societies

- National Academy of Sciences
- Phi Beta Kappa
- Sigma Xi
- Alpha Omega Alpha
- American Association for the Advancement of Science
- American Physiological Society
- Society for Experimental Biology and Medicine
- American Surgical Association
- American Society for Clinical Surgery
- American Gastroenterological Association
- American College of Physicians
- American College of Surgeons
- American Medical Association
- Central Surgical Society
- Institute of Medicine of Chicago
- American Academy of Arts and Sciences
- Honorary Member of the Surgical Societies of Seattle, Los Angeles, Detroit, Minneapolis, Southern California, Graduate Surgeons of Los Angeles, and Boston

Honorary Memberships in Foreign Organizations and Societies

- Surgical Society of Lyons
- Surgical Society of Paris
- Swedish Surgical Society
- Argentine Society of Gastroenterology
- Fellow of the Royal College of Physicians and Surgeons of Canada
- Fellow of the Royal College of Surgeons of England
- National Academy of Medicine of Mexico
- Royal Academy of Arts and Sciences of Uppsala, Sweden (Foreign Corresponding Member)
- Academy of Surgery of France
- Association of Mexican Gastroenterologists

== Honors and awards ==
American Honors and Awards

- 1945 Silver Medal of the American Medical Association for original investigation
- 1946 Gold Medal of the Illinois State Medical Society for original investigation
- 1950 Gold Medal of the American Medical Association for original investigation
- 1961 Samuel D. Gross Prize of the Philadelphia Academy of Surgery
- 1963 Distinguished Service Award of the American Medical Association for research, teaching, and surgical practice
- 1964 Julius Friedenwald Medal of the American Gastroenterological Association for "Outstanding Achievement in Gastroenterology"
- 1964 Golden Plate from the Academy of Achievement
- 1964 Henry Jacob Bigelow Medal of the Boston Surgical Society for "Contributions to the Advancement of Surgery"
- 1965 Annual Award of the Gastrointestinal Research Foundation
- 1969 Distinguished Service Award (the first) and Gold Medal of the American Surgical Association

Foreign Honors and Awards

- 1953 Honorary Professor of Surgery at the University of Guadalajara, Mexico
- 1965 Gold Medal of the Surgical Society of Malmo, Sweden
- 1967 Royal Order of the North Star of Sweden, bestowed by the King of Sweden, for "Outstanding Contributions to the Science of Surgery"
- 1969 Silver Plaque of the Institute of Digestive Diseases and Nutrition of Mexico City
- 1969 Silver Plaque of the Association of Mexican Gastroenterologists

== Selected bibliography ==
These are from the National Academy of Sciences Biographical Memoir.

1916

- With J. J. Moorhead and F. W. Burcky. The nature of the toxemia of intestinal obstruction. Preliminary report. Proc. Soc. Exp. Biol. Med., 14:17-19.

1917

- Contributions to the physiology of the stomach. XXXVIII. Gastric juice in duodenal and gastric ulcers. J. Am. Med. Assoc, 68:330-33.
- With J. J. Moorhead and F. W. Burcky. An experimental study of the intoxication in closed intestinal loops. J. Exp. Med., 25:421-39.

1922

- The pathogenesis of parathyroid tetany. J. Am. Med. Assoc, 79: 1593-94.

1923

- The pathogenesis of parathyroid tetany. Am. J. Physiol., 63:408—9.
- With S. C. Peacock. Studies on the pathogenesis of tetany. I. The control and cure of parathyroid tetany by diet. Am. J. Physiol., 64:424-34.
- With S. C. Peacock. The influence of parathyroidectomy on gastric secretion. Am. J. Physiol., 64:499-502.
- With K. Phillips and A. C. Sudan. Studies on the pathogenesis of tetany. II. The mechanism involved in recovery from parathyroid tetany. Am. J. Physiol., 65:368-78.

1924

- The resistance of various tissues to gastric digestion. Am. J. Physiol., 68:134.

1926

- With A. C. Sudan. Studies on the pathogenesis of tetany. V. The prevention and control of parathyroid tetany by calcium lactate. Am. J. Physiol., 77:296-306.
- With A. C. Sudan. Studies on the pathogenesis of tetany. VII. The prevention and control of parathyroid tetany by the oral administration of kaolin. Am. J. Physiol., 77:314—20.

1927

- The physiology of the parathyroid glands. Physiol. Rev., 7:499-530.

1929

- With J. C. Ellis. Effect of liver autolysis in vivo. Proc. Soc. Exp. Biol. Med., 26:304-5.
- With J. C. Ellis. Fatal effect of total loss of gastric juice. Proc. Soc. Exp. Biol. Med., 26:305-7.

1930

- With J. C. Ellis. Liver autolysis in vivo. Arch. Surg., 20:8—16.
- With M. L. Montgomery, W. B. Matthews, and J. C. Ellis. Fatal effect of the total loss of pancreatic juice. Proc. Soc. Exp. Biol. Med., 28:110-11.

1931

- With M. L. Montgomery, J. C. Ellis, and W. B. Matthews. The pathogenesis of acute dilatation of the stomach. Surg. Gynecol. Obstet., 52:1075-86.

1932

- With W. L. Palmer. Direct observations on the mechanism of pain in duodenal ulcer. Proc. Soc. Exp. Biol. Med., 29:753-55.
- With W. B. Matthews. The etiology of gastric and duodenal ulcer. Experimental Studies. Surg. Gynecol. Obstet., 55:265—86.

1933

- Ulcus acidum of Meckel's diverticulum. J. Am. Med. Assoc, 101:20-22.

1934

- With H. E. Haymond and J. C. Ellis. Pathogenesis of acute pancreatitis (acute pancreatic necrosis). Arch. Surg., 28:232-91.

1936

- Acid ulcer. Surg. Gynecol. Obstet., 62:118-20.
- With J. Van Prohaska and H. P. Harms. Observations on a substance in pancreas (a fat metabolizing hormone) which permits survival and prevents liver changes in depancreatized dogs. Am. J. Physiol., 117:175-81.

1938

- Lipocaic. A new pancreas hormone. Northwest Med., 37:33-36.
- With W. C. Goodpasture, C. Vermeulen, and P. B. Donovan. The Bromsulphalein liver function test as a method of assay of lipocaic. Am. J. Physiol., 124:642-46.

1939

- With C. D. Stewart, D. E. Clark, and S. W. Becker. The experimental use of lipocaic in the treatment of psoriasis. A preliminary report. J. Invest. Dermatol., 2:219-30.
- With P. B. Donovan, D. E. Clark, W. C. Goodpasture, and C. Vermeulen. The relation of lipocaic to the blood and liver lipids of depancreatized dogs. Am. J. Physiol., 127:755-60.
- With C. Vermeulen, W. C. Goodpasture, P. B. Donovan, and W. A. Geer. Lipocaic and fatty infiltration of the liver in pancreatic diabetes. Arch. Intern. Med., 64:1017-38.

1940

- With D. E. Clark, O. C. Julian, C. Vermeulen, and W. C. Goodpasture. Arteriosclerosis in pancreatic diabetes. Surgery, 8:353-61.

1942

- With C. Vermeulen, D. E. Clark, O. C. Julian, and J. G. Allen. Effect of the administration of lipocaic and cholesterol in rabbits. Arch. Surg., 44:260-67.

1943

- With F. M. Owens, Jr. Supra-diaphragmatic section of the vagus nerves in treatment of duodenal ulcer. Proc. Soc. Exp. Biol. Med., 53:152-54.

1945

- With T. F. Thornton, Jr. and E. H. Storer. Supra-diaphragmatic section of vagus nerves and gastric secretion in patients with peptic ulcer. Proc. Soc. Exp. Biol. Med., 59:140-41.
- With D. E. Clark and M. L. Eilert. Lipotropic action of lipocaic. A study of the effects of lipocaic, methionine and cystine on dietary fatty livers in the white rat. Am. J. Physiol., 144:620-25.

1946

- With M. L. Eilert. Lipotropic action of lipocaic: A study of the effect of oral and parenteral lipocaic and oral inositol on the dietary fatty liver of the white rat. Am. J. Physiol., 147:346-51.

1948

- With E. R. Woodward, E. B. Tovee, H. A. Oberhelman, Jr., and W. B. Neal, Jr. A quantitative study of the effect of vagotomy on gastric secretion in the dog. Proc. Soc. Exp. Biol. Med., 67:350-51.
- With E. R. Woodward and R. R. Bigelow. Quantitative study of effect of antrum resection on gastric secretion in Pavlov pouch dogs. Proc. Soc. Exp. Biol. Med., 68:473-74.

1950

- With E. R. Woodward, W. B. Neal, Jr., P. V. Harper, Jr., and E. H. Storer. Secretory studies on the isolated stomach. Arch. Surg. 60:1-20.
- With E. R. Woodward and R. R. Bigelow. Effect of resection of antrum of stomach on gastric secretion in Pavlov pouch dogs. Am. J. Physiol., 162:99-109.

1951

- With H. A. Oberhelman, Jr. and C. A. Smith. Experimental gastrojejunal ulcers due to antrum hyperfunction. Arch. Surg., 63:298-302.

1952

- With J. M. Zubiran, A. E. Kark, J. A. Montalbetti, and C. J. L. Morel. Peptic ulcer and the adrenal stress syndrome. Arch. Surg., 65:809-15.

1953

- With S. O. Evans, Jr., J. M. Zubiran, J. D. McCarthy, H. Ragins, and E. R. Woodward. Stimulating effect of vagotomy on gastric secretion in Heidenhain pouch dogs. Am. J. Physiol., 174:219-25.

1957

- With C. M. Baugh, J. Barcena, and J. Bravo. Studies on the site and mechanism of gastrin release. Surg. Forum, 7:356—60.
- With C. F. Mountain, J. H. Landor, J. D. McCarthy, and P. V. Harper, Jr. The secretory effect of gastric transection. Surg. Forum, 7:375-79.
- With J. Barcena, C. M. Baugh, J. L. Bravo, and C. F. Mountain. Effects of total pancreatectomy on gastric secretion. Surg. Forum, 7:380-82.

1962

- Section of the vagus nerves to the stomach in the treatment of duodenal ulcer. In: Surgery of the Stomach and Duodenum, ed. H. N. Harkins and L. M. Nyhus, pp. 461–72. Boston: Little, Brown.

1963

- With E. R. Woodward, C. L. Park, Jr., and H. Schapiro. Significance of Meissner's plexus in the gastrin mechanism. Arch. Surg., 87:512-15.

1965

- With C. de la Rosa and E. R. Woodward. Localization of the gastrinproducing cell. Surg. Forum, 16:327-29.

1968

- With D. R. Kemp, F. Herrera-Fernandez, and E. R. Woodward. Meissner's plexus and the mechanism of vagal stimulation of gastric secretion. Gastroenterology, 55:76-80.

1971

- With J. R. N. Curt, J. Isaza, and E. R. Woodward. Potentiation between intestinal and gastric phases of acid secretion in Heidenhain pouches. Arch. Surg., 105:709-12.

1973

- With G. Wickbom, M. A. Kamal, and E. R. Woodward. Corrosive effects of digestive juices on legs of living frogs. Am. Surgeon, 39:571-81.

1974

- With G. Wickbom, F. L. Bushkin, and C. Linares. On the corrosive properties of bile and pancreatic juice on living tissue in dogs. Arch. Surg., 108:680-84.

1976

- With J. B. Weeks, G. C. Petridis, and E. R. Woodward. A simplified method for chemical induction of gastric hypersecretion. J. Surg. Res., 21:357-58.
