= Thayer Lake (Antrim County) =

Lake in the state of Michigan, United States

- Location within Michigan Location within the United States
- Location: Antrim County, Michigan
- Coordinates: 44°55′42″N 85°16′52″W
- Type: Lake
- Basin countries: United States
- Surface area: 97 acres (39 ha)
- Max. depth: 18 ft (5.5 m)
- Surface elevation: 610 feet (190 m)

Thayer Lake is a lake in Antrim County, Michigan, in the United States.

== History ==
Thayer Lake was named for a family of early settlers. Helena Township in the county is named for Helena M. Thayer, also from the same family.

== See also ==
- List of lakes in Michigan
