= Alden, Michigan =

- Census-designated place (CDP) & unincorporated community
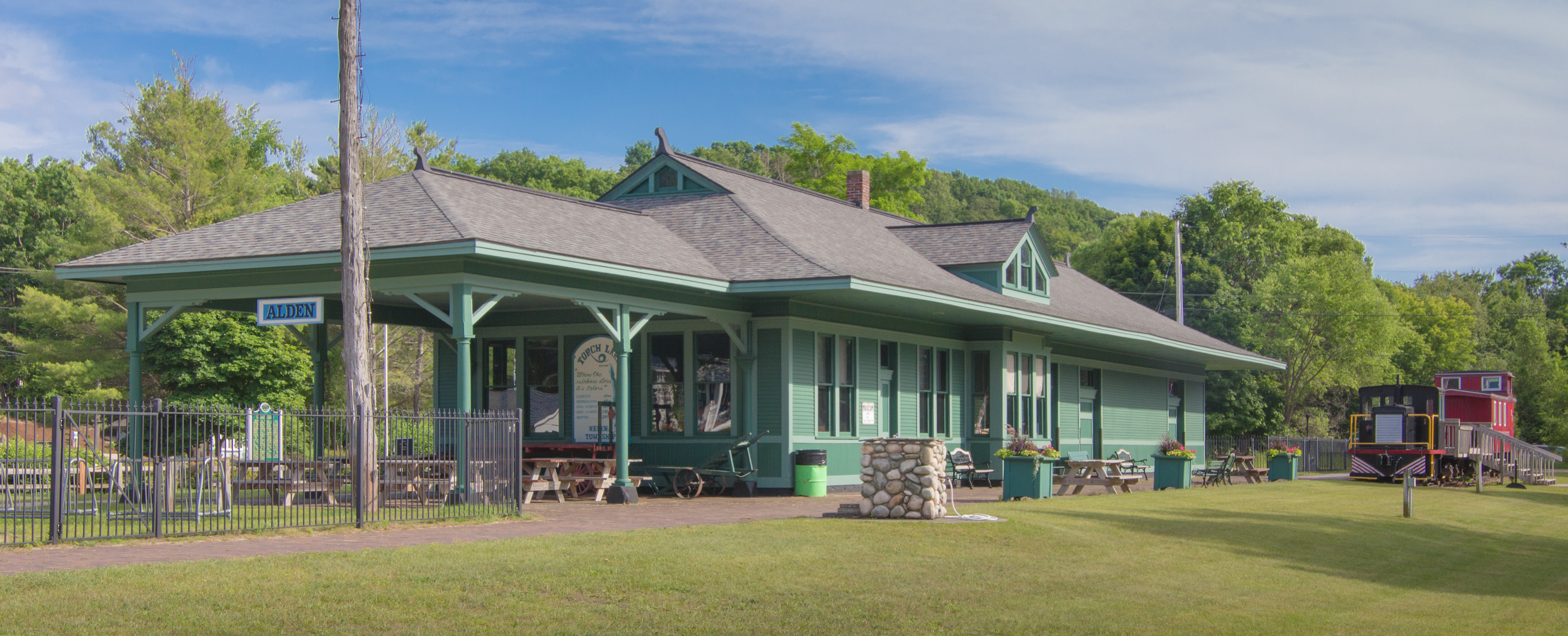
- Pere Marquette Station

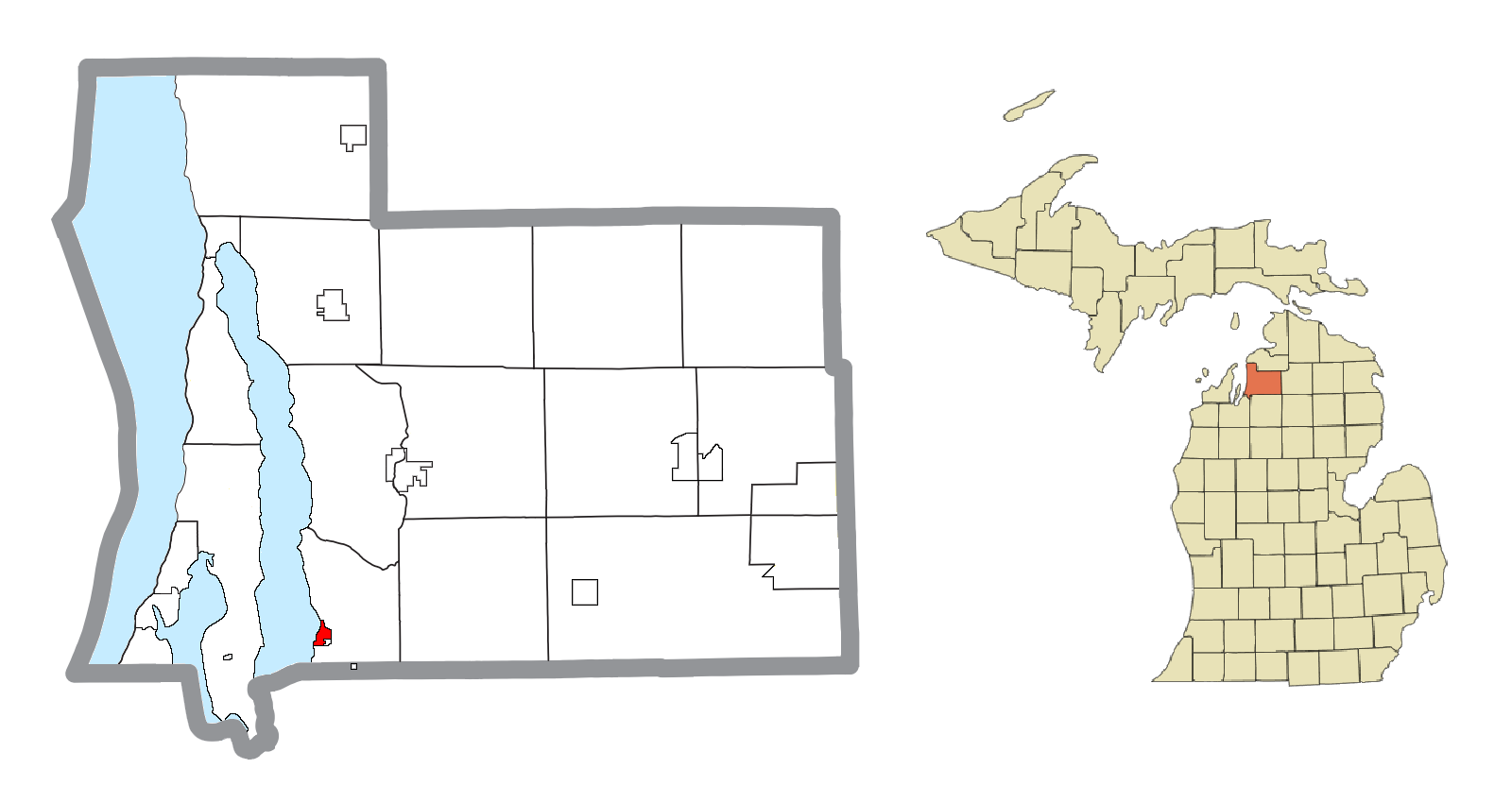
- Location within Antrim County

- Location within the state of Michigan Alden (the United States)
- Coordinates: 44°52′52″N 85°16′32″W
- Country: United States
- State: Michigan
- County: Antrim
- Township: Helena
- Settled: 1868

Area
  - Total: 0.40 sq mi (1.04 km^{2})
  - Land: 0.40 sq mi (1.04 km^{2})
  - Water: 0 sq mi (0.00 km^{2})
- Elevation: 604 ft (184 m)

Population (2020)
  - Total: 123
  - Density: 307.4/sq mi (118.69/km^{2})
- Time zone: UTC-5 (Eastern (EST))
  - Summer (DST): UTC-4 (EDT)
- ZIP code(s): 49615 (Bellaire)
- Area code: 231
- GNIS feature ID: 619916

Alden is an unincorporated community and census-designated place (CDP) located in Antrim County in the U.S. state of Michigan. Located within Helena Township, the community is located upon the shores of Torch Lake. The population of the CDP was 123 at the 2020 census.

== History ==
Alden was first settled as early a 1868 by storekeeper F. J. Lewis in Helena Township, and he chose the name Noble as the name for the new settlement. The growing community was located along the mouth of Spencer Creek along Torch Lake, which was named after John Spencer. The community itself also became known as Spencer Creek and was given a post office under that name on June 15, 1869. In 1891, the Pere Marquette Railway expanded into the area, and Spencer Creek was renamed Alden after railroad official William Alden Smith, who would later become a state politician. The post office was renamed Alden on July 18, 1892.

The community of Alden was listed as a newly organized census-designated place for the 2010 census, meaning it now has officially defined boundaries and population statistics for the first time.

== Geography ==
According to the U.S. Census Bureau, the Alden CDP had a total area of 0.40 square miles (1.04 km^{2}), all land.

== Demographics ==
As of the 2020 census, Alden has a population of 123 with 59 households and a median income of 49,063.

Historical population
Census	Pop.	Note	%±
2010	125		—
2020	123		−1.6%
U.S. Decennial Census
