= Elk Lake (Michigan) =

Lake in the state of Michigan, United States

- View from Rotary Park Pavilion in Elk Rapids

- Location within the state of Michigan Elk Lake (the United States)
- Location: Antrim / Grand Traverse counties, Michigan, US
- Coordinates: 44°51′N 85°23′W
- Type: lake
- Primary inflows: Lake Skegemog
- Primary outflows: Elk River
- Basin countries: United States
- Surface area: 7,730 acres (3,130 ha)
- Max. depth: 192 ft (59 m)
- Surface elevation: 587 feet (179 m)
- Settlements: Elk Rapids

Elk Lake is located in Antrim and Grand Traverse counties in Northern Michigan. The lake is about a one and a half miles (2.4 km) wide and nine miles (14 km) long, and is centered at 44°51′N 85°23′W near the town of Elk Rapids. It has maximum depth of 192 ft (59 m), making it Michigan's second deepest after Torch Lake. It is a popular lake for fishing, featuring lake trout, rock bass, yellow perch, smallmouth bass, muskellunge, ciscoes, brown trout, rainbow trout, and whitefish.

Elk Lake lies to the west of the larger Torch Lake, which lies just to the east. It is part of a watershed that begins in northern Antrim County with Intermediate Lake, which is connected by the Intermediate River with Lake Bellaire. The Grass River flows from Lake Bellaire into Clam Lake, which in turn drains into Torch Lake via the short Clam River. Torch Lake is drained by the Torch River, which flows into Lake Skegemog, which opens into Elk Lake. Elk Lake flows through Elk River into the east arm of Grand Traverse Bay at Elk Rapids. This watershed is popularly known as the Chain of Lakes.

== Wabigama club ==
Wabigama is a private colony situated on the eastern bank of Elk Lake in Rapid City, Michigan. It was founded in 1924 by Lester Dragstedt and other University of Chicago professors. Founding members were leaders with a common interest in academic and applied research including (among others) medicine, physiology, and sociology. Friends comprised the remaining members.

The club has offered anonymity from the local community, refuge from their public life and some of the few remaining wilderness areas on private land. The club's land tract was surrounded by rural life until the late 1970s when commercial interests started encroaching. The camp is located less than five miles (8.0 km) from one of Northern Michigan's best-known vacation areas, on the south end of Torch Lake.

Membership is closed and has been passed through family lines for three generations. Some the better-known members include Arno B. Luckhardt (MD, PhD Physiology), John Crout (chemical engineer), Carl Dragstedt (M.D.), and Louis Leon and Thelma Gwinn Thurstone (and continued by two of their sons, Fredrick L. and Robert L. Thurstone. The camp is mentioned in Edwin G. Boring's A History of psychology in autobiography and in the obituaries of various individuals involved with the colony.

== See also ==
- List of lakes in Michigan
