= Rapid City, Michigan =

- Census-designated place (CDP) & unincorporated community
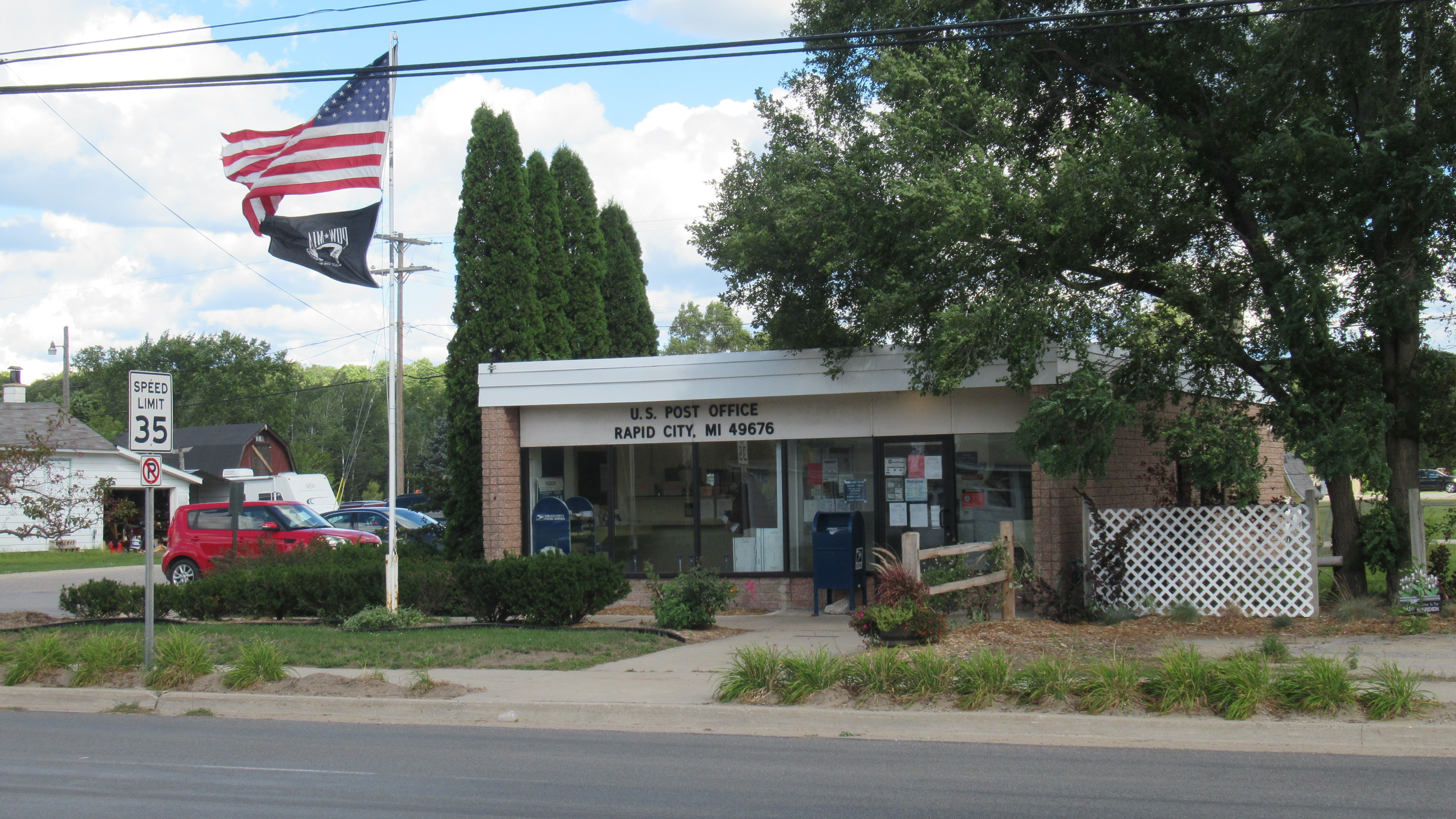
- Post office in Rapid City

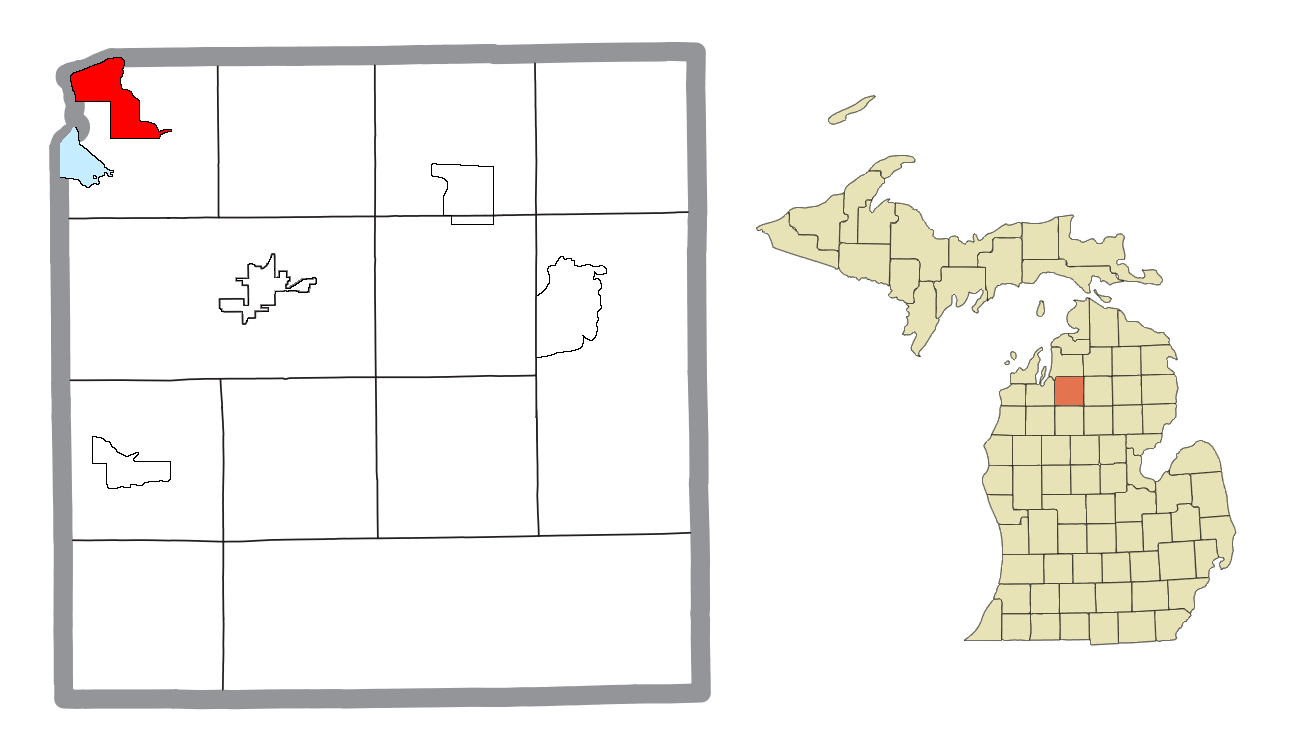
- Location within Kalkaska County

- Location within the state of Michigan Rapid City (the United States)
- Coordinates: 44°50′04″N 85°16′57″W
- Country: United States
- State: Michigan
- County: Kalkaska
- Township: Clearwater

Area
  - Total: 5.53 sq mi (14.31 km^{2})
  - Land: 5.41 sq mi (14.01 km^{2})
  - Water: 0.12 sq mi (0.30 km^{2})
- Elevation: 630 ft (190 m)

Population (2020)
  - Total: 1,357
  - Density: 250.9/sq mi (96.87/km^{2})
- Time zone: UTC-5 (Eastern (EST))
  - Summer (DST): UTC-4 (EDT)
- ZIP code(s): 49676
- Area code: 231
- GNIS feature ID: 635648

Rapid City is an unincorporated community and census-designated place (CDP) in Kalkaska County in the U.S. state of Michigan. At the 2020 census, the CDP had a population of 1,357. Rapid City is located within Clearwater Township, and is about 8 miles (13 km) northwest of Kalkaska.

== History ==
A post office first opened in the area as Van Buren on November 22, 1892. The post office was renamed to Vanburen on January 18, 1895, and finally to Rapid City on April 30, 1898. The town is named after the Rapid River, which flows through it.

The community of Rapid City was listed as a newly organized census-designated place for the 2010 census, meaning it now has officially defined boundaries and population statistics for the first time. The CDP is organized for statistical purposes only and has no legal status as an incorporated municipality.

== Geography ==
According to the United States Census Bureau, the community has an area of 5.50 square miles (14.24 km^{2}), of which 5.41 square miles (14.01 km^{2}) is land and 0.09 square miles (0.23 km^{2}) (1.64%) is water.

The community is located on the Rapid River, and is immediately adjacent Torch Lake. Rapid River is located on the Antrim County line.

== Demographics ==
Historical population
Census	Pop.	Note	%±
2010	1,352		—
2020	1,357		0.4%
U.S. Decennial Census
