= Bitely, Michigan =

- Unincorporated community
- Location within the state of Michigan
- Coordinates: 43°44′49″N 85°51′42″W
- Country: United States
- State: Michigan
- County: Newaygo
- Township: Lilley
- Elevation: 866 ft (264 m)
- Time zone: UTC-5 (Eastern (EST))
  - Summer (DST): UTC-4 (EDT)
- ZIP code: 49309
- Area code: 231
- GNIS feature ID: 1619222

Bitely is an unincorporated community in Lilley Township, within Newaygo County, Michigan, in the United States. It is within the Manistee National Forest. It is near Bitely Lake, Lamoreaux Lake, Isaac Lake, Houseman Lake and several smaller lakes.

It was a station on the Chicago and West Michigan Railroad (later the Pere Marquette, then the Chesapeake and Ohio, now Marquette Rail) in 1889, and given a post office on September 13, 1889, with Archer D. Martin as its first postmaster. It was named for Steven Bitely, who built a sawmill there, but due to a typographical error, the post office was initially spelled as Biteley.

The Bitely Homecoming parade is held the third Saturday of every July.
