= Elk River (Michigan) =

- Looking upsteam from The Island House bridge

Physical characteristics
- Source
  - location: Elk Lake
  - coordinates: 44.88555°N 85.40388°W
- Mouth
  - location: Grand Traverse Bay, Lake Michigan
  - coordinates: 44.90166°N 85.41368°W
- Length: 1.5 mi (2.4 km)

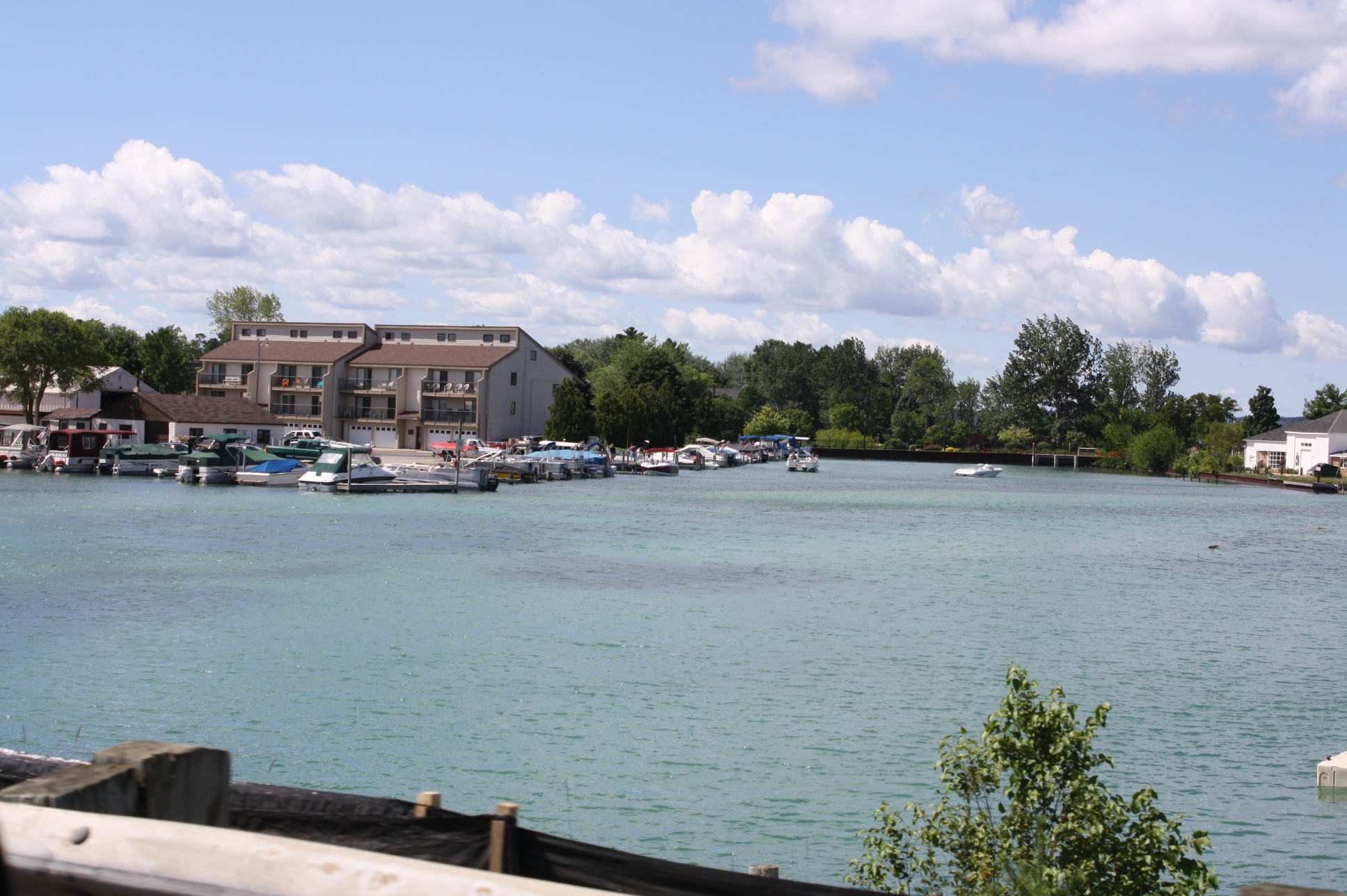
Elk River bridge from US 31

The Elk River is a short river in the Lake Michigan drainage basin of the U.S. state of Michigan. It is only 1.5 miles (2.4 km) in length and flows from Elk Lake into Grand Traverse Bay of Lake Michigan. It forms a waterway and harbor for the municipality of Elk Rapids.

Elk Lake is 192 feet (59 m) deep and is a former arm of Lake Michigan. When the larger lake's level dropped, a belt of sediment separated Elk Lake from Grand Traverse Bay, and a short, whitewater river, Elk River, formed to provide drainage for the smaller lake.

The Indians named the river Meguzee, in honor of the Anishinaabe name for the bald eagle. In the early 19th century, Euro-American settlers arrived. In 1858, someone discovered a pair of elk antlers in the rapids; the rapids, river, and lake were renamed after the animal.

The rapids are quiet now, as a hydroelectric dam has been built. Boats must portage the dam, using adjacent boat ramps. Below the dam, the river opens out into Grand Traverse Bay and forms the harbor of Elk Rapids.

== See also ==
- Elk River Chain of Lakes Watershed
