= Torch Lake (Antrim County, Michigan) =

Lake in Antrim County, Michigan

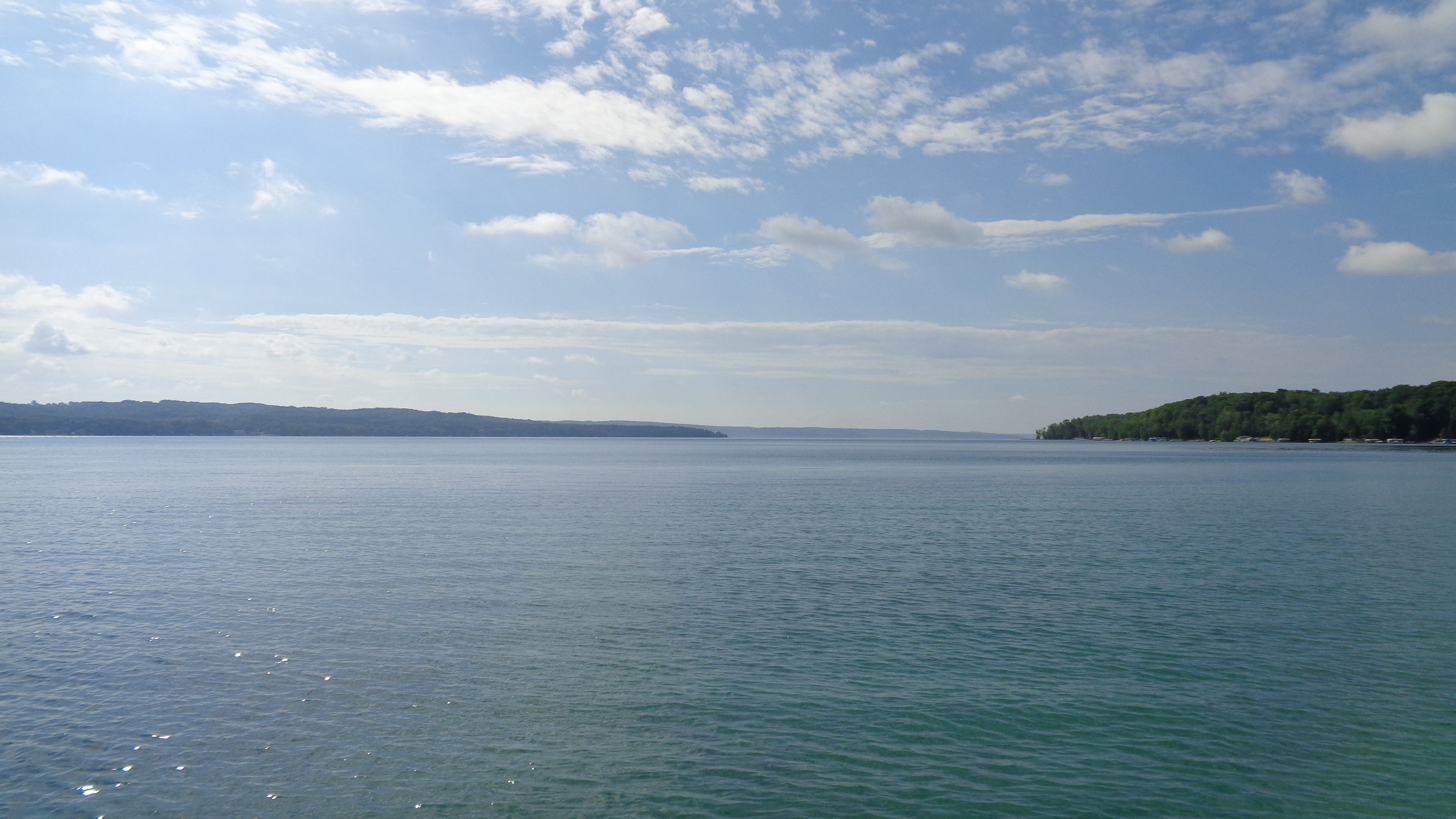
- View from Torch Lake Township

- Location within the state of Michigan
- Location: Antrim & Kalkaska counties, Michigan, U.S.
- Coordinates: 44°59′00″N 85°18′30″W
- Etymology: waaswaaganing (Ojibwe) 'place of torches'
- Primary inflows: Clam River
- Primary outflows: Torch River
- Basin countries: United States
- Max. length: 19 miles (31 km)
- Max. width: 2 miles (3.2 km)
- Surface area: 18,770 acres (7,600 ha)
- Average depth: 111 ft (34 m)
- Max. depth: 310 ft (94 m)
- Water volume: 0.78 cu mi (3.3 km^{3})
- Surface elevation: 591 feet (180 m)
- Islands: None
- Settlements: Alden, Clam River, Eastport, Torch Lake, Torch River

Torch Lake is a lake in the Northern Lower Peninsula of the U.S. state of Michigan. At 19 miles (31 km) long, it is Michigan's longest inland lake, and at approximately 29.3 mi^{2} (76 km^{2}), it is Michigan's second largest inland lake, after Houghton Lake. It has a maximum depth of 310 feet (94 m) and an average depth of 111 feet (34 m), making it Michigan's deepest inland lake, as well as the state's largest by volume.

Surrounding it are several townships including Torch Lake, Central Lake, Forest Home, Helena, and Milton in Antrim County, and Clearwater Township of neighboring Kalkaska County. Several villages and hamlets lie along its shore, including Alden, Eastport, Clam River, Torch Lake, and Torch River. It is a popular lake for fishing, featuring lake trout, rock bass, yellow perch, smallmouth bass, muskellunge, pike, ciscoes, brown trout, steelhead, rainbow trout, atlantic salmon and whitefish.

== History ==
Torch Lake was originally formed at the end of the Last Glacial Period, along with neighboring Lake Michigan. Receding glaciers carved the surface of the Earth, and melting glaciers filled the new basins, which are now known as the Great Lakes. Torch Lake (along with other long lakes in the region like Lake Leelanau and Elk Lake) were originally bays of the young Lake Michigan. However, sandbars formed at the northern end of these lakes, separating them from Lake Michigan.

The name of the lake is not due to its shape, rather, is derived from translation from the Ojibwe name waaswaaganing meaning "Place of Torches" or "Place of Flames", referring to the practice of the local Native American population who once used torches at night to attract fish for harvesting with spears and nets (Lac du Flambeau in Wisconsin is named after the same Ojibwa term). For a time, it was referred to by local European settlers as "Torch Light Lake", which eventually was shortened to its current name.

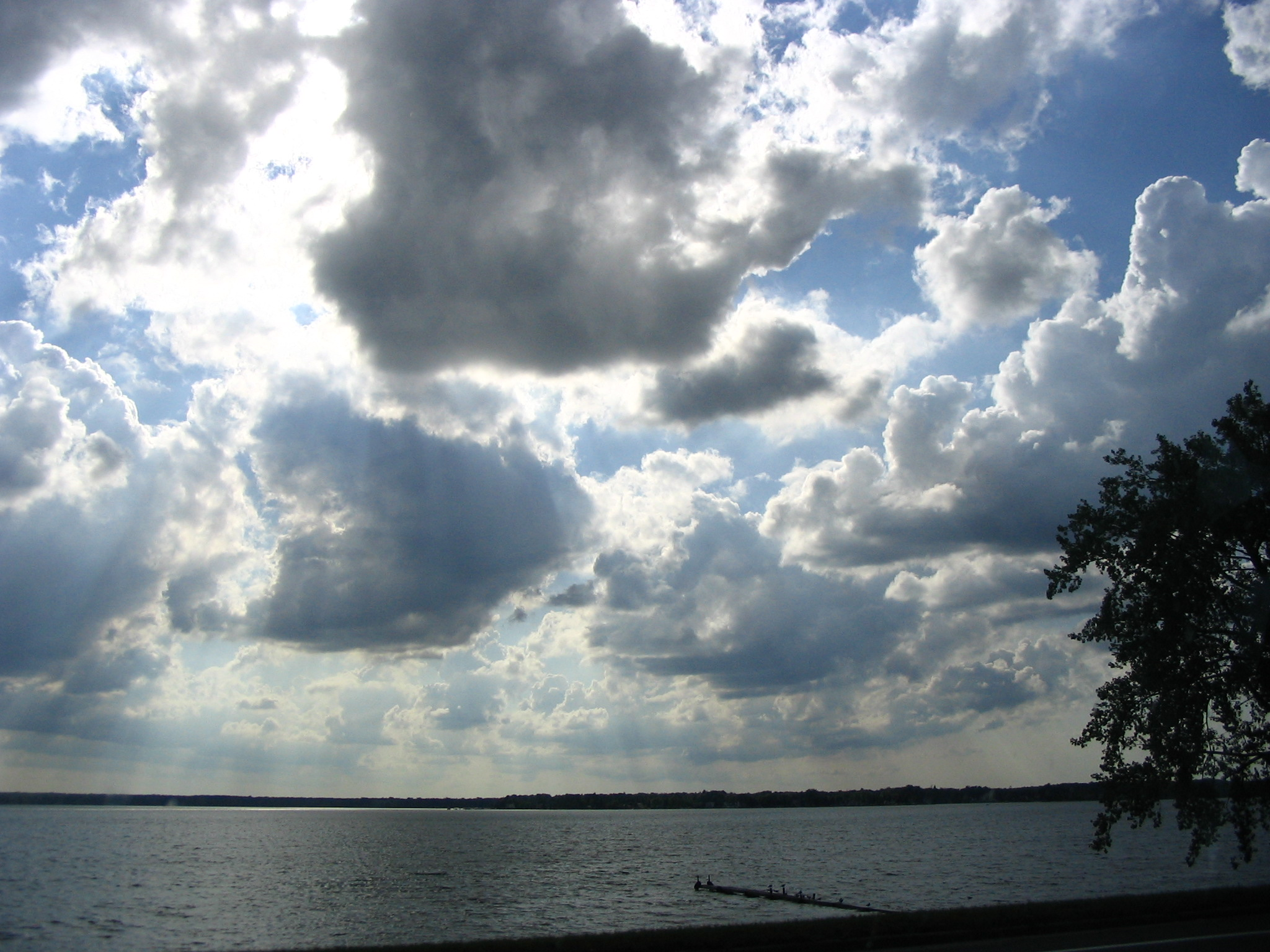
View of Torch Lake

== Geography ==
Torch Lake is part of a watershed that begins in northern Antrim County with Six Mile Lake, which is connected by the Intermediate River with Lake Bellaire. The Grass River flows from Lake Bellaire into Clam Lake, which in turn drains into Torch Lake via the short Clam River. Torch Lake itself is drained by the Torch River, which flows into Lake Skegemog, which opens into Elk Lake. Elk Lake flows into the east arm of Grand Traverse Bay at Elk Rapids. This watershed is popularly known as the Chain of Lakes.

The lake itself is entirely within Antrim County. However, the southern shore of the lake serves as part of the actual border between Antrim and Kalkaska counties. The lake is located about 17 miles northeast of Traverse City.

== Activities ==
The lake is known for nature activities including hiking, canoeing, fishing and diving. Owing to the low amount of boat activity, it is a nature-lovers paradise. Noted for its exceptional beauty; its waters are unusually clear and exhibit a bright turquoise hue, often resembling the Caribbean Sea. This quality has made the lake a popular spot for the development of resorts and vacation homes.

At the south end of the lake is a sandbar, locally known as the Torch Lake Sandbar. This sandbar is a popular summer tourist destination, especially around the Fourth of July.

== See also ==
- List of lakes in Michigan
