= Lake Skegemog =

Lake in the state of Michigan, United States

- Round Lake, Skegemog Lake
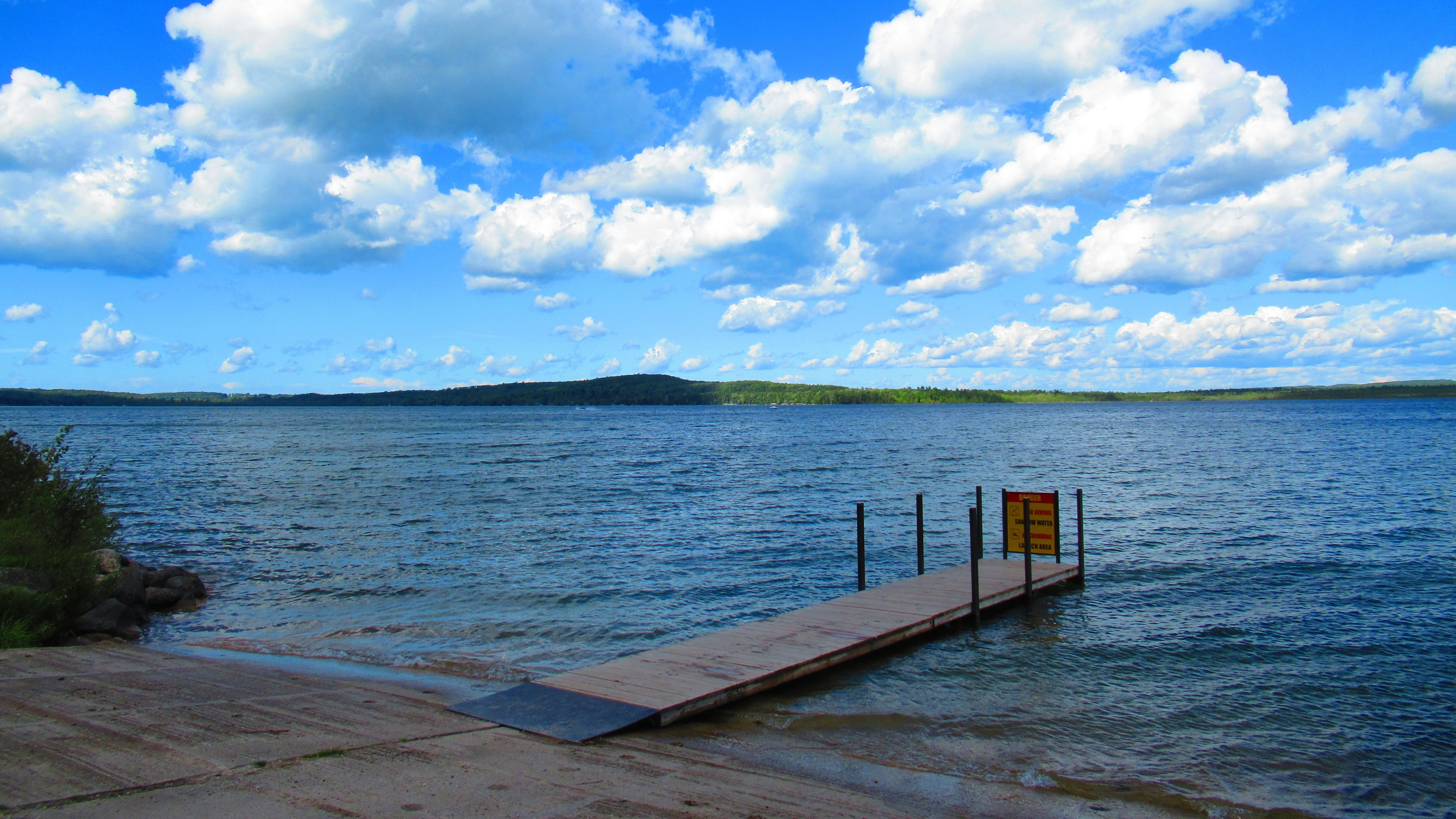
- View from the boating access site in Whitewater Township

- Location within Michigan
- Location: Antrim, Grand Traverse and Kalkaska Counties, Michigan
- Coordinates: 44°49′N 85°20′W
- Primary inflows: Torch River
- Primary outflows: Elk Lake
- Basin countries: United States
- Max. length: 3.5 mi (5.6 km)
- Max. width: 1.3 mi (2.1 km)
- Surface area: 2,766 acres (11 km^{2})
- Max. depth: 29 ft (9 m)
- Shore length^{1}: 15 mi (24.1 km)
- Surface elevation: 587 feet (179 m)
- Islands: None
- ^{1} Shore length is not a well-defined measure.

Lake Skegemog (/ˈskiːɡəmɔːɡ/ SKEE-guh-mawg), formerly known as Round Lake and Skegemog Lake, is a lake in Northern Michigan. The lake is part of the Elk River Chain of Lakes, itself part of the Lake Michigan watershed. Within the lake is the tripoint of Antrim, Grand Traverse, and Kalkaska counties.

== Geography ==
Lake Skegemog has a surface area of 2,766 acres (11 km^{2}) and 15 miles of shoreline. The name 'Skegemog' is an Algonquin word which means "the meeting of the waters".

It is part of the Elk River Chain of Lakes, a 75-mile-long (121 km) waterway consisting of 14 lakes and connecting rivers which empty into Lake Michigan. The lake's primarily inflow is the Torch River, bringing in water from Torch Lake and elsewhere in the Chain of Lakes. The lake is connected at the west to Elk Lake, and through Elk Lake, water outflows through the short Elk River. The Elk River then empties into the East Arm of the Grand Traverse Bay, itself a bay of Lake Michigan.

The lake contains many stumps and logs which provide a nice living area for many species of fish. In addition, much of the surrounding land around the lake is covered in a swamp.

== Fishing ==
The lake is home to many species of wild fish including muskellunge, walleye, brown trout, largemouth bass, smallmouth bass, rock bass, northern pike, yellow perch and crappie.

== See also ==
- List of lakes in Michigan
