= Carl Dragstedt =

Carl Dragstedt (1895–1983) is a scientist who discovered the role of histamine in anaphylaxis.

He was a chairman of the Northwestern University's pharmacology department, a Northwestern professor for 38 years and a retired physician with a practice in Edison Park.
