= Acme =

Acme may refer to:

== Arts and entertainment ==
- Acme Corporation, in the Road Runner/Wile E. Coyote animated shorts, later a generic fictional company name
- ACME Detective Agency, in the Carmen Sandiego video game series
- Acme and Septimius, a fictional couple in Catullus 45, a poem by Roman poet Catullus
- Acme (band), a Japanese metalcore band
- Acme (album), by the Jon Spencer Blues Explosion, 1998
- Acme (card game), a patience or card solitaire

== Businesses and organizations ==
=== Aircraft and vehicle manufacturing companies ===
- Acme Aircraft Co, later Sierradyne, an American aircraft manufacturer in Torrance, California
- Acme Aircraft Corporation, an American aircraft manufacturer in Rockford, Illinois
- Acme, manufacturer of the Acme automobile, an American early motor car
- Acme Motor Co, an English motorcycle manufacturer
- Acme Motor Truck Company, an American early motor truck manufacturer
- Air Craft Marine Engineering (ACME), a short-lived American aircraft manufacturer

=== Other manufacturing companies ===
- Acme Boots, an American manufacturer of boots
- Acme Brick, an American manufacturer of brick and masonry-related construction products
- ACME Laboratories, a pharmaceutical company based in Bangladesh
- Acme Packet, an American communication components manufacturer
- Acme Tackle Company, an American producer of fishing tackle
- Acme United Corporation, an American supplier of cutting, measuring and safety products
- Acme Whistles, formed as J Hudson & Co

=== Arts, entertainment and media companies ===
- ACME Comedy Theatre, Los Angeles, California, US
- ACME Comics & Collectibles, a store in Sioux City, Iowa, US
- ACME Communications, an American broadcasting company
- ACME Newspictures, an American news agency 1923–1952
- Acme Press, later Acme Comics, a British comic book publisher 1986–1995
- Acme, a moniker that preceded Rockstar North, a video game developer

=== Other companies ===
- Acme Bread Company, a bakery in Berkeley, California, US
- Acme Fresh Market, a chain of grocery stores in Ohio, US
- Acme Markets, an American supermarket chain
- Acme Naming, a company founded by Andrea Carla Michaels
- Acme Tools, or Acme Electric Motor, Inc., an American tool and equipment retail business
- Acme Truck Line, a transportation service based in Gretna, Louisiana, US
- Acme Space, an English architecture firm
- acme.com, and ACME Laboratories, owned by computer programmer Jef Poskanzer

=== Organizations ===
- Advisory Committee on Mathematics Education, of the Royal Society and the Joint Mathematical Council
- Acme Studios, a London charity that provides studio and living space for visual artists

== People ==
- Acme (enslaved woman) (died 5 BC), Jewish slave and maid
- Andrea Carla Michaels, nicknamed ACME, American crossword puzzle constructor

== Places ==
=== Canada ===
- Acme, Alberta, a village

=== United States ===
- Acme, Indiana, an unincorporated town
- Acme, Kansas, an unincorporated community
- Acme, Louisiana, an unincorporated community
- Acme, Michigan, an unincorporated community
- Acme Township, Michigan
- Acme, North Carolina, an unincorporated community
- Acme Township, Hettinger County, North Dakota
- Acme, Oklahoma, a ghost town
- Acme, Pennsylvania, an unincorporated community
- Acme, Texas, a ghost town
- Acme, Washington, a census-designated place
- Acme, West Virginia, an unincorporated community

== Science and technology ==
- Acme (computer virus)
- ACME (health software)
- Acme (text editor)
- Acme thread form, a screw thread profile
- Acme zone, a biostratigraphic zone
- Arginine catabolic mobile element, a mobile genetic element of Staphylococcus
- Automatic Certificate Management Environment, a communications protocol
- Summit or acme, a topographic term
- ACME Laboratories, an open source software host of Jef Poskanzer

== Transportation ==
=== Ships ===
- USS Acme, the name of two ships
- USS Abarenda (IX-131), originally named SS Acme, a storage tanker
- Acme (1876), a Australian schooner
- Acme (shipentine), launched for Standard Oil in 1901
- Acme (steamboat), operated in Washington state 1899–1910

=== Vehicles ===
- Acme (automobile), an early American automobile
- Acme motorcycle (1911–1913), by the Acme Motor & Engineering Company of Melbourne, Australia
- Acme motorcycle (1915–1917), assembled by EMY Ready in Tasmania, Australia
- Acme motorcycle (1939–1949), assembled and marketed by Bennett & Wood of Sydney, Australia

== Other uses ==
- Acme Building, in Billings, Montana, US
- Acme Farm Supply Building, in Nashville, Tennessee, US
- ACME Comic Con, a fan convention in Glasgow, Scotland
- Australian Centre for the Moving Image, a museum in Melbourne, Australia

== See also ==
- Acne
