= Acme Motor Truck Company =

Defunct American motor vehicle manufacturer

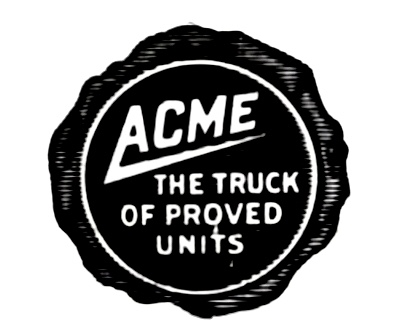
- Formerly: Cadillac Auto Truck Co.
- Type: Truck Company
- Industry: Manufacturing
- Founded: 1915; 111 years ago
- Defunct: 1931; 95 years ago
- Headquarters: Cadillac, Michigan, US
- Products: Trucks

The Acme Motor Truck Company of Cadillac, Michigan, was a truck manufacturer.

== History ==
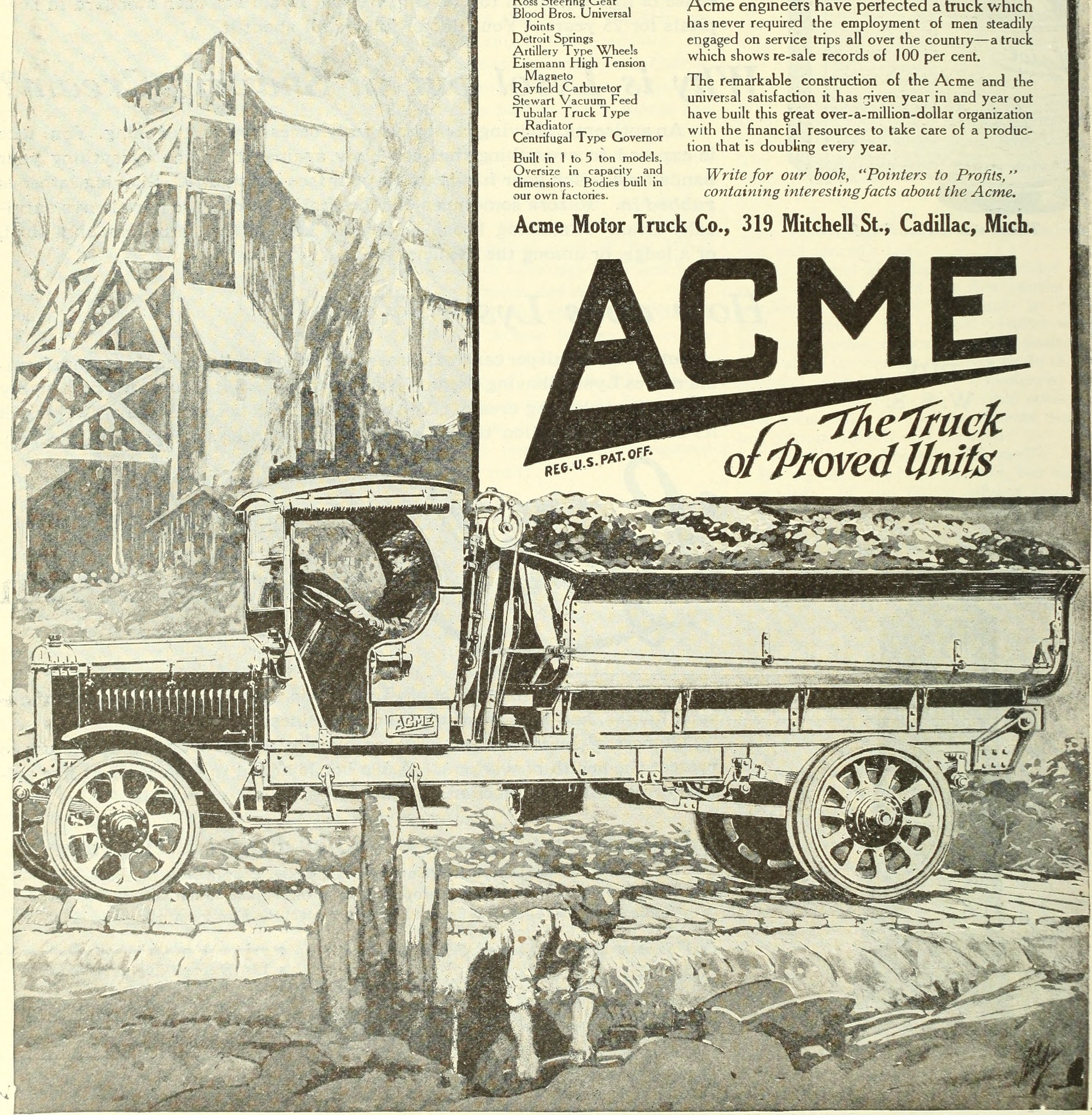
Acme Advertisement

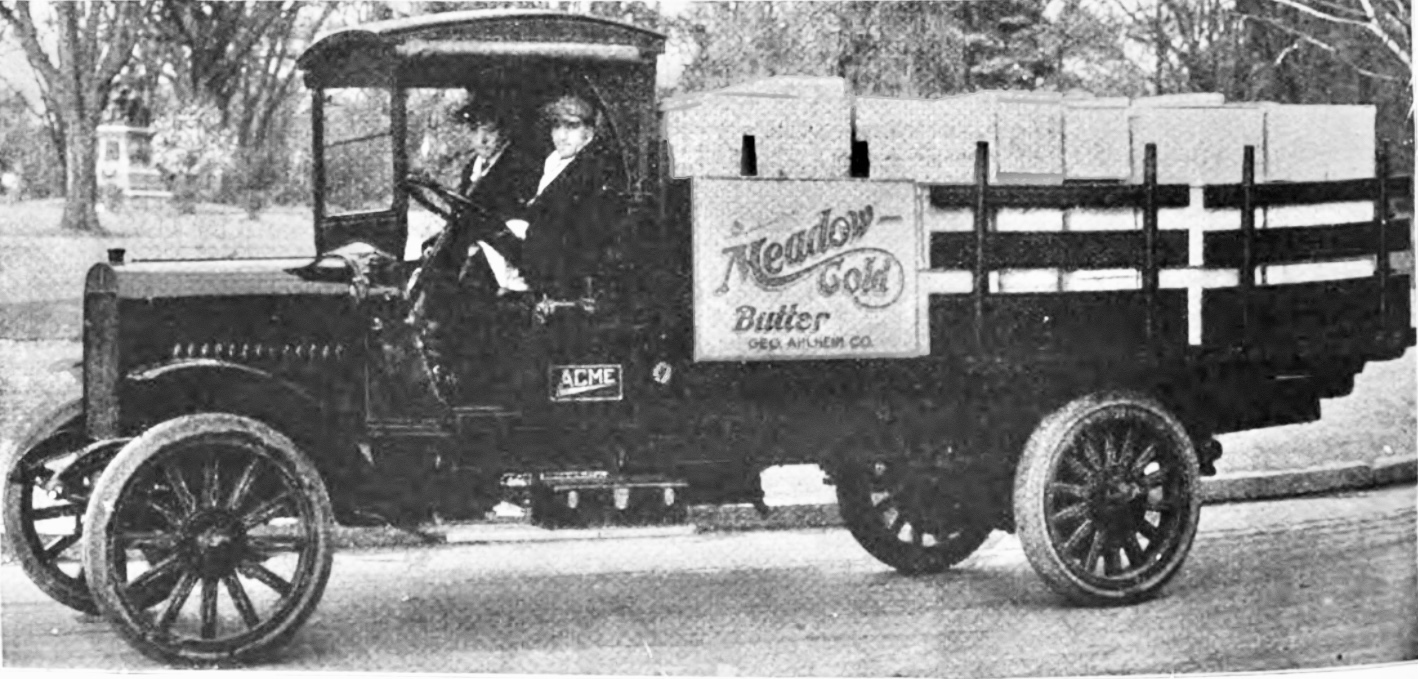
Acme Model A (1918) 2 to

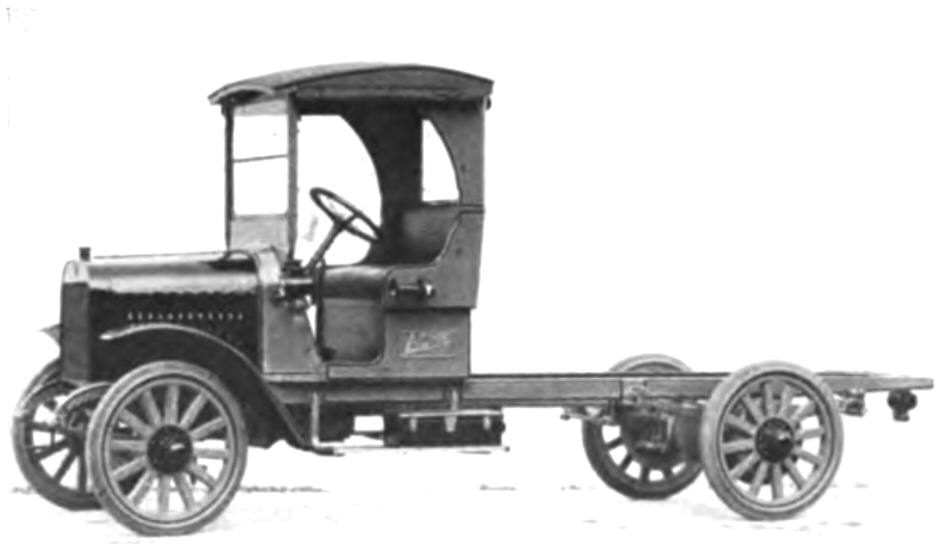
Acme Model B (1917) 1 to

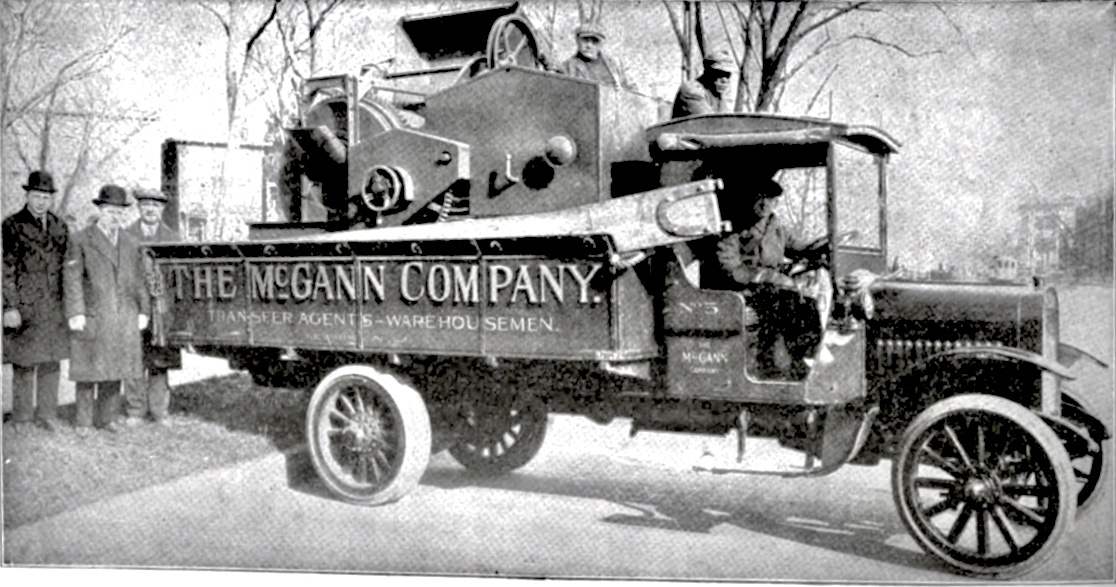
Acme Model D (1918) 4 to

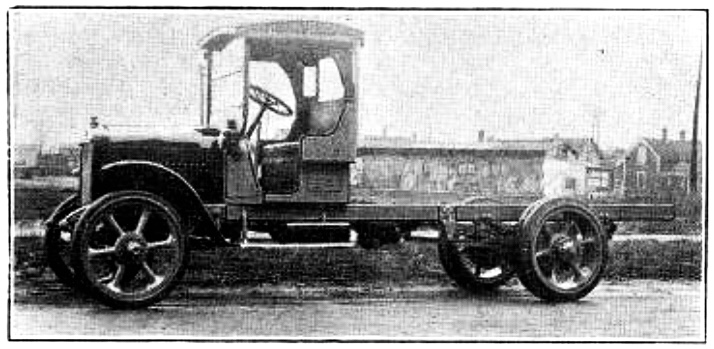
Acme Model 60L (1922-1924)

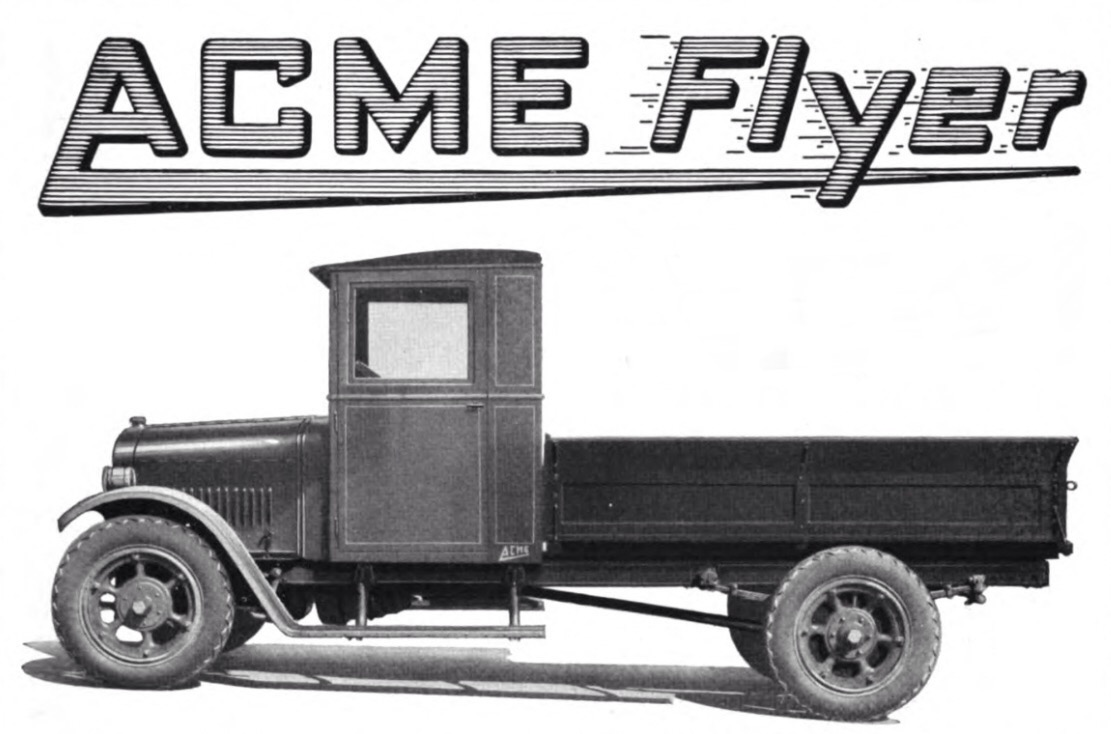
Acme Flyer Model 21 (1925) 1 to

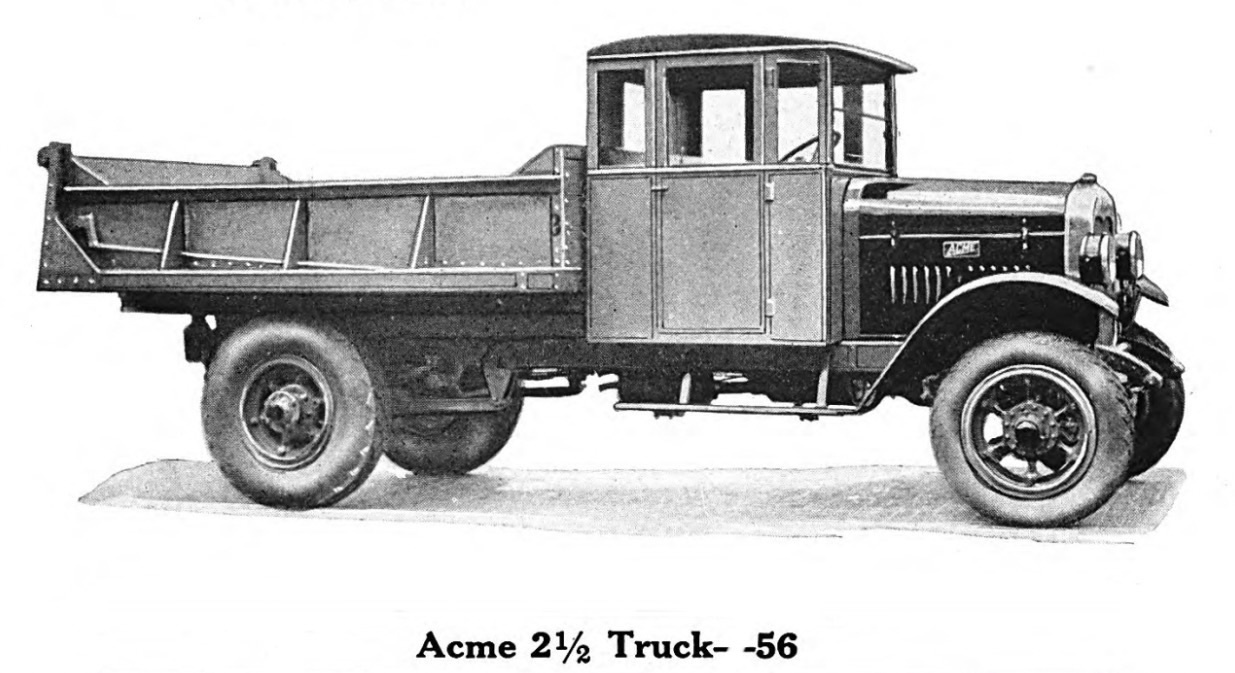
Acme Model 56 (1928) 2,5 to

The company, founded in 1915 in Cadillac, Michigan, produced light and medium-sized trucks under the company name Cadillac Auto Truck Co. It was one of the manufacturers that assembled vehicles from components available on the market. These were accordingly referred to as "assembled vehicles" and were common in the commercial vehicle sector. There is no connection to the automobile manufacturer Cadillac, which derived its name directly from Antoine Laumet de La Mothe, Sieur de Cadillac. However, this very manufacturer successfully sued over the similarity of the names. As a result, the new company name was changed to Acme Motor Truck Co in January 1918. Obviously overlooked in this name change was that Acme was also a problematic name, which had been actively used in many industries, including by other motor vehicle manufacturers. The capital stock has increased to $ 1,000,000 in January 1918.

In the first eight months of the year 1929, Acme was able to sell 275 trucks. In the last year of production, 1931, new models were still introduced. The 3X as 1.5 tons, the 4X as 2 tons, the 6X as 3 tons, the 8X as 4 tons, and finally the 10X as 5 tons. ACME used engines from the company Continental.

There is no connection to Acme in Reading, Pennsylvania or to Acme Motor Car Company of New York (incorporated 1905) - J Fe Smet Maguire, R Lewis Julian, and George H Stout (Directors).

=== Production figures ===
The pre-assigned serial numbers only indicate the maximum possible production quantity.

Year	Production figures	Model	Load capacity	Serial number
1915				
1916	~ 158	A	2 to	1 to 8 and 59 to 200 and 251 to 258
1916	~ 59	B	1 to	51 to 99 and 150 to 159
1917	~ 335	A	2 to	259 to 315 and 1216 to 1490
1917	~ 142	B	1 to	159 to 190 and 5091 to 5200
1917	~ 75	C	3,5 to	101 to 105 and 8006 to 8076
1917	~ 6	D	4 to	9000 to 9005
1918	~ 427	A	2 to	1491 to 1917
1918	~ 163	B	1 to	5201 to 5363
1918	~ 132	C	3,5 to	8077 to 8208
1918	~ 53	D	4 to	9006 to 9058
1919	~ 449	A	2 to	1918 to 2366
1919	~ 174	B	1 to	5364 to 5537
1919	~ 178	C	3,5 to	8209 to 8386
1919	~ 147	E	5 to	9201 to 9347
1919	~ 88	F	1,5 to	7001 to 7088
1920	~ 494	A	2 to	2367 to 2860
1920	~ 101	B	1 to	5538 to 5638
1920	~ 222	C	3,5 to	8387 to 8608
1920	~ 32	E	5 to	9348 to 9379
1920	~ 262	F	1,5 to	7089 to 7350
1920	~ 19	G	0,75 to	6001 to 6019
1921	~ 56	A	2 to	2861 to 2916
1921	~ 18	B	1 to	5639 to 5656
1921	~ 16	C	3,5 to	8609 to 8623 and 8627
1920	~ 33	E	5 to	9380 to 9412
1921	~ 59	F	1,5 to	7350 to 7408
1921	~ 106	G	0,75 to	6020 to 6125
1921	~ 35	AC	2,5 to	4501 to 4535
1922	77	20	0,75 to	6126 to 6202
1922	5	30	1 to	5657 to 5661
1922	71	40	1,5 to	7412 to 7482
1922	111	60	2,5 to	2917 to 3027
1922	106	60L	2,5 to	4536 to 4641
1922	86	90	3,5 to	8628 to 8714 minus 8627
1922	33	125	5 to	9414 to 9446
1923	124	20	1 to	6202 to 6325
1923	24	30	1,5 to	5662 to 5685
1923	40	40	2 to	7483 to 7522
1923	31	40L	2 to	4001 to 4031
1923	90	60	3 to	3028 to 3117
1923	119	60L	3 to	4642 to 4760
1923	48	90	4,5 to	8714 to 8761
1923	22	90L	4,5 to	3702 to 3723
1923	15	125	6,25 to	9447 to 9461
1923	11	K	bus	9701 to 9711
1924		20	1 to	6226 to
1924		20L	1 to	6501 to
1924		30	1,5 to	5686 to
1924		40	2 to	7523 to
1924		40L	2 to	4044 to
1924		60	3 to	3128 to
1924		60L	3 to	4784 to
1924		90	4,5 to	8762 to
1924		90L	4,5 to	3738 to
1924		125	6,25 to	9464 to
1924		K	bus	9716 to
1925		21 „Flyer“	1 to	10001 to .. and 10058 to ..
1928		14	1 to	
		16	1 to	
		24	1,25 to	
		44	2 to	
		46	2 to	
		54	2,5 to	
		56	2,5 to	
		74	3,5 to	
		76	3,5 to	
		90	4,5 to	
		104	6,5 to	
		106	6,5 to	
1931		45 D	3,5 to	
		3X	1,5 to	
		4X	2 to	
		6X	3 to	
		8X	4 to	
		10X	5 to	
Sum				
