= Apperson Six Sport Sedan =

The Apperson Six Sport Sedan was a car manufactured by the Apperson Company of Kokomo, Indiana.

== Apperson Six Sport Sedan specifications (1926 data) ==
- Color – Imperial blue, maroon, and gray-green
- Seating Capacity – Five
- Wheelbase – 120 inches
- Wheels - Disc
- Tires - 32” x 5.77” balloon
- Service Brakes – Mechanical four wheel brakes
- Engine - Six cylinder, vertical, cast en bloc, 3-3/16 x 4-1/4 inches; head removable; valves in head; H.P. 24.4 N.A.C.C. rating
- Lubrication – Force feed
- Crankshaft - Four bearing
- Radiator – Tubular
- Cooling – Thermo-syphon
- Ignition system – Storage Battery
- Starting System – Two Unit
- Voltage – Six to eight
- Wiring System – Single
- Gasoline System – Vacuum
- Clutch – Disc
- Transmission – Selective sliding
- Gear Changes – 3 forward, 1 reverse, mechanically operated
- Drive – Spiral bevel
- Rear Springs – Three-quarter elliptic
- Rear Axle – Semi-floating
- Steering Gear – Worm and gear

=== Standard equipment ===
New car price included the following items:

- tools
- jack
- front bumper
- windshield cleaner
- rearview mirror
- speedometer
- ammeter
- dash fuel gauge
- rim
- foot rest
- armrests
- heater
- snubbers
- ventilators on all doors
- screened cowl ventilator
- sun visor
- Sport Phaetons have permanent top and windshield wings
- All sizes equipped with preselecting mechanical gear shift

=== Optional equipment ===
The following was available at an extra cost:

none

=== Prices ===
New car prices were F.O.B. factory, plus Tax:

- Five passenger Phaeton - $1650
- Five passenger Sport Phaeton - $1750
- Five passenger Sport Sedan - $2250
- Five passenger Brougham - $2150
- Four passenger Coupé - $2250
