= Acme Township, Michigan =

- Civil township
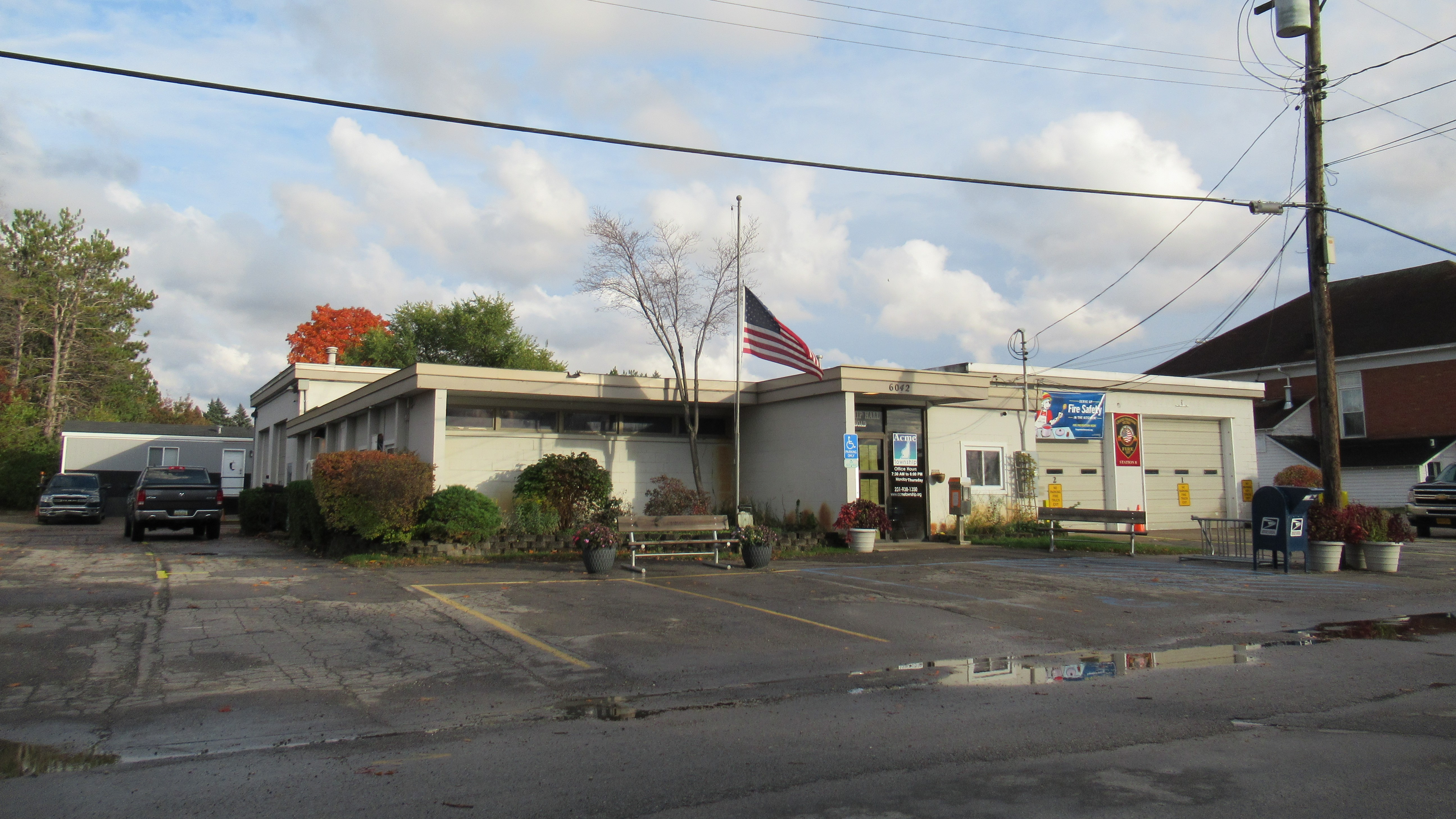
- Acme Township Hall

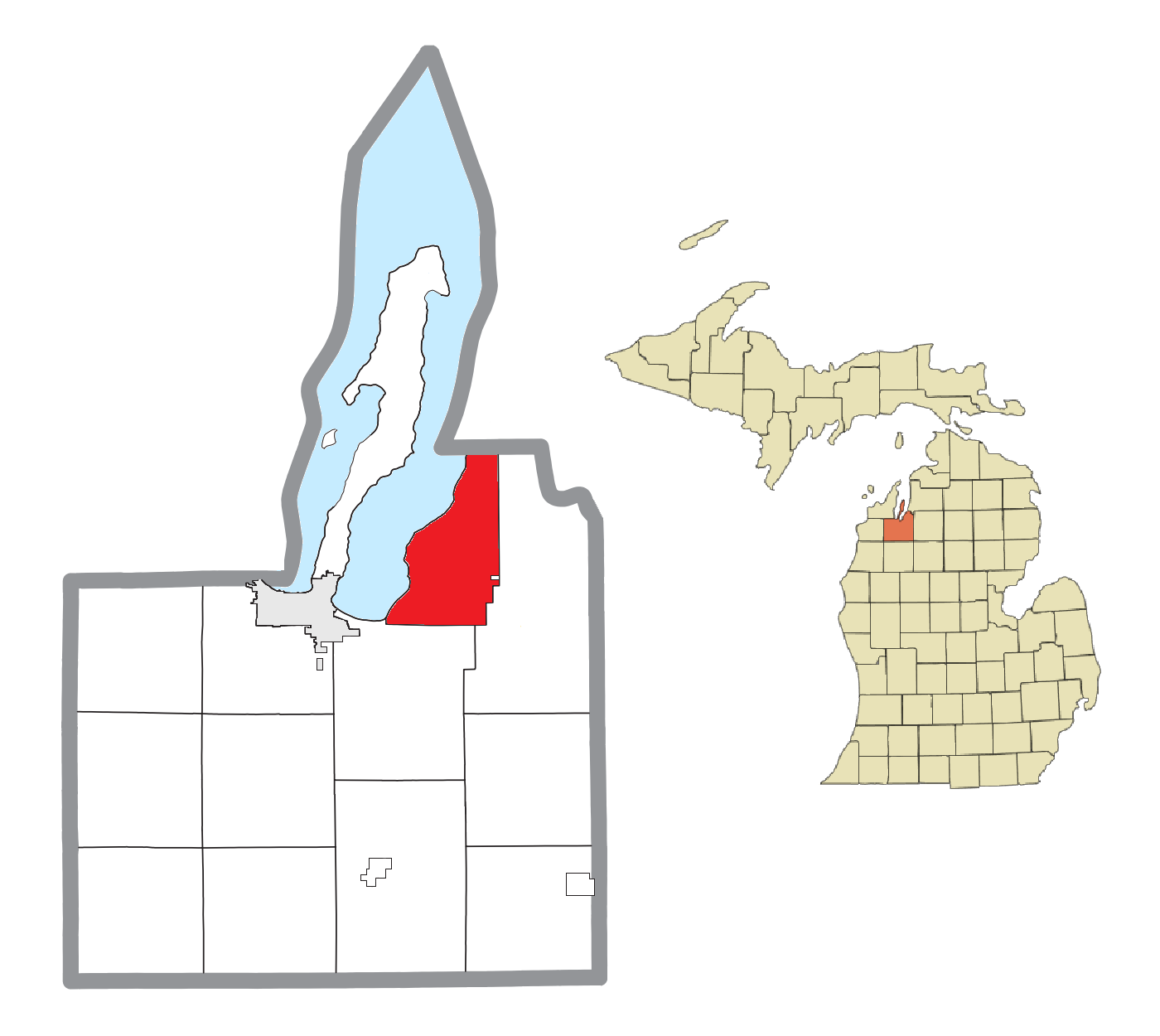
- Location within Grand Traverse County

- Location within the state of Michigan Acme Township (the United States)
- Coordinates: 44°46′50″N 85°28′46″W
- Country: United States
- State: Michigan
- County: Grand Traverse
- Organized: January 7, 1891

Government
  - Supervisor: Doug White

Area
  - Total: 25.3 sq mi (65.6 km^{2})
  - Land: 25.2 sq mi (65.2 km^{2})
  - Water: 0.15 sq mi (0.4 km^{2})
- Elevation: 771 ft (235 m)

Population (2020)
  - Total: 4,456
  - Density: 172/sq mi (66.4/km^{2})
- Time zone: UTC-5 (Eastern (EST))
  - Summer (DST): UTC-4 (EDT)
- ZIP code(s): 49610 (Acme); 49686 (Traverse City); 49690 (Williamsburg)
- Area code: 231
- FIPS code: 26-00200
- GNIS feature ID: 1625797

Acme Township (/ˈækmiː/ AK-mee) is a civil township of Grand Traverse County in the U.S. state of Michigan. As of the 2020 census, the township population was 4,456, a slight increase from 4,375 at the 2010 census. The southwestern portion of the township is largely urbanized, due to its proximity to Traverse City. Much of the rest of the township is agricultural, with the area being a cherry growing hotspot. The township lies upon the East Arm of Grand Traverse Bay, a bay of Lake Michigan. A portion of the township is within the Grand Traverse Reservation.

Acme Township takes its name from the Greek word, acme, meaning "summit".

== Geography ==
According to the United States Census Bureau, the township has a total area of 25.3 square miles (66 km^{2}), of which 25.2 square miles (65 km^{2}) is land and 0.2 square miles (0.52 km^{2}) (0.63%) is water.

The township has a shore on the East Arm of Grand Traverse Bay, a bay of Lake Michigan.

=== Adjacent townships ===
- Elk Rapids Township, Antrim County (north)
- Whitewater Township (east)
- East Bay Township (south)
- Peninsula Township (west; water boundary)

=== Climate ===
This climatic region has large seasonal temperature differences, with warm to hot (and often humid) summers and cold (sometimes severely cold) winters. According to the Köppen Climate Classification system, Acme Township has a humid continental climate, abbreviated "Dfb" on climate maps.

=== Major highways ===
- US 31 runs south–north through the township. To the south, the highway runs through Traverse City, and further west into Benzie County.
- M-72 runs primarily west–east through the township. It exits the township to the east into Whitewater Township, and runs further east into Kalkaska County.

== Communities ==
- Acme is an unincorporated community in the southwest of the township, situated at the junction of US 31 and M-72 on the East Arm of the Grand Traverse Bay of Lake Michigan.
- Bates is a ghost town in the township situated on M-72 three miles (5 km) east of Acme at 44°46′22″N 85°26′39″W. It was established in 1891.
- Fivemile Corner is an unincorporated community at a former junction of US 31/M-72 with Five Mile Road and Holiday Road (44°44′48″N 85°31′21.4″W).
- Holiday Hills is a sprawling suburban community located in the southwest of the township, immediately adjacent to Fivemile Corner. It is shared to the south with East Bay Township.
- Yuba is an unincorporated community in the northern section of the township, situated on US 31 between Acme and Elk Rapids.

== History ==
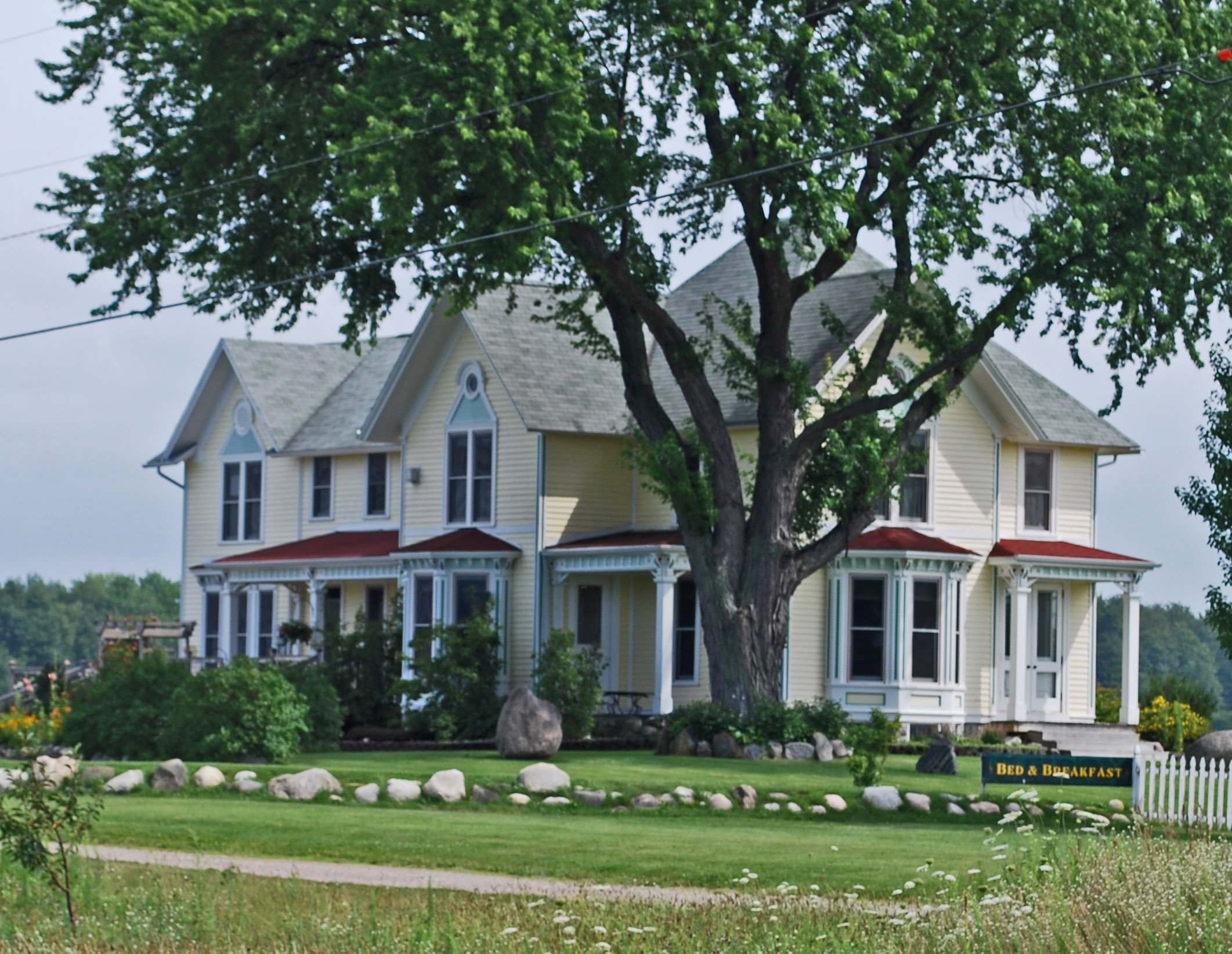
John Pulcipher House

The 1891 Acts of the Legislature of the State of Michigan include the following. Application to the board of supervisors of Grand Traverse County was made November 10, 1890 to separate from East Bay Township and form Acme Township. Signatories included residents A.C. Hoxie, Milton Beck, W.A. Lee, J.W. Green, E.B. Arnold, L.P. Fox, Walter Mull, J.H. Fife, Isaac Love, John McDonald, John Rogers, Eddy Newcomb, W.H. Fife, C.V. Hill, Joseph Taylor, C.J. Liddell, Andrew Newcomb, H.F. Allen, L.W. Lackey, George Smith, H.L. Allen. Notices were posted by Charles H. Estes throughout the townships and published in the Grand Traverse Herald newspaper. The January 5th to January 7 meeting of the Grand Traverse County board of supervisors approved this application submitted by John Pulcipher.

== Demographics ==
As of the census of 2000, there were 4,332 people, 1,667 households, and 1,231 families residing in the township. The population density was 172.1 inhabitants per square mile (66.4/km^{2}). There were 2,215 housing units at an average density of 88.0 per square mile (34.0/km^{2}). The racial makeup of the township was 97.30% White, 0.23% African American, 0.28% Native American, 0.35% Asian, 1.06% from other races, and 0.78% from two or more races. Hispanic or Latino of any race were 2.10% of the population.

There were 1,667 households, out of which 33.4% had children under the age of 18 living with them, 65.3% were married couples living together, 5.8% had a female householder with no husband present, and 26.1% were non-families. 21.3% of all households were made up of individuals, and 10.0% had someone living alone who was 65 years of age or older. The average household size was 2.56 and the average family size was 2.99.

In the township the population was spread out, with 25.5% under the age of 18, 6.2% from 18 to 24, 27.1% from 25 to 44, 27.4% from 45 to 64, and 13.9% who were 65 years of age or older. The median age was 41 years. For every 100 females, there were 94.1 males. For every 100 females age 18 and over, there were 94.9 males.

The median income for a household in the township was $50,425, and the median income for a family was $58,886. Males had a median income of $36,201 versus $26,607 for females. The per capita income for the township was $24,219. About 4.5% of families and 6.5% of the population were below the poverty line, including 3.5% of those under age 18 and 9.7% of those age 65 or over.
