= Reber (automobile) =

Defunct American motor vehicle manufacturer

Reber Manufacturing Company
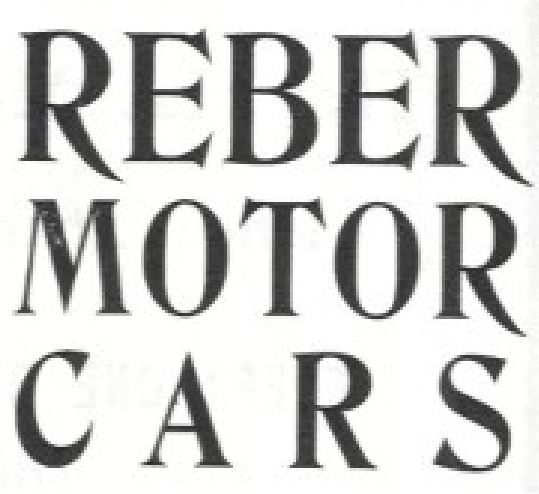
- Reber logo from advertisement
- Industry: Automotive
- Predecessor: Acme Manufacturing Company
- Founded: 1901; 125 years ago
- Founder: James C. Reber
- Defunct: 1903; 123 years ago
- Fate: name change
- Successor: Acme Motor Car Company
- Headquarters: Reading, Pennsylvania, United States
- Key people: James C. Reber, James Heaslet
- Products: Automobiles

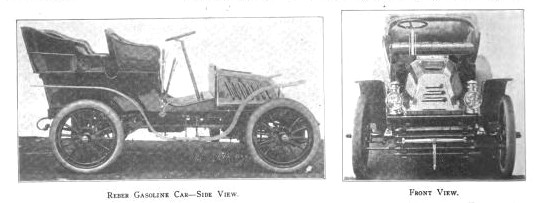
1902 Reber Type IV Model A, Rear Entrance Tonneau

The Reber was a make of American automobile manufactured at Reading, Pennsylvania from 1902 until 1903. It was made by the Reber Manufacturing Company, founded in 1901 by James C. Reber.

== Background ==
=== James C Reber ===
Reber was admitted to Reading Boys High School in 1883 at the age of 15. He became Secretary of the Young Men's Society of Christian Endeavour in 1886. He was also Noble Chief of Fraternity Castle No 302 of Reading and in 1891 a Deacon of St Andrews Reformed Church. In 1890 he was the traveling agent for hardware merchants Bard, Reber, and Co, his father's company. He married Mary Uhrich in September 1891 and the couple lived at 1852 Mineral Springs Road. In 1895 Reber was a timer at the Penn Wheelmen bicycle races.

=== Acme Machine Company (bicycle manufacturers) ===
In February 1894 Reber's father James T Reber founded the Acme Machine Company with capital of $40,000 and was its President. Reber was appointed as its General Manager. The company was set up in Court Street to make bicycles and cigar-making machinery.

On 1 July 1899 the Reber's resigned their interest in Bard, Reber, and Co (which first became Bard, Schlott, and Co and then in 1902 Bard Hardware Co) to concentrate their effort on Acme. Acme was making bicycles at that time. Later in the month Acme joined, along with 44 other firms, the American Bicycle Company.

== Reber Manufacturing Company ==
On 15 July 1901 Reber announced that he was retiring from the American Bicycle Company and was constructing an automobile manufacturing plant at Wyomissing, east of the Montello brick plant. He had already constructed and tested a prototype which he believed would be popular.

Reber Manufacturing Company made a number of experimental models. One of the earliest is held in the Reynolds-Alberta Museum, Canada. In 1902 James Reber hired engineer James Heaslet from Autocar to help him design a 'French type" automobile. The result was the Reber Type IV Model A tonneau, powered by a vertical-twin engine from 1902 to 1903. This car was the crossover model with Acme. Reber's transmission was said to be used by Henry Ford in his first car.

In June 1903 Reber acquired the old Acme Machine Company's bicycle factory on the corner of Eighth and Elm Streets, Reading for $47,000 at a receivership auction of the American Bicycle Company. Reber stated that he was going to use the factory to manufacture automobiles under the Reber Manufacturing Company name. With the purchase of this site Reber also announced that Reber Manufacturing was changing its name to the Acme Motor Car Company.

in 1903 James Reber hired Victor Jakob from Daimler in Germany to develop a new car that would become the 1904 Type V Acme.

The Reber Manufacturing Company of Pottsville is a later company.

== Advertisements ==
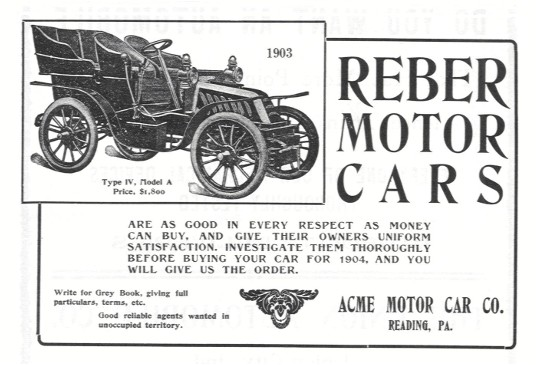
1903 Reber Type IV advertisement

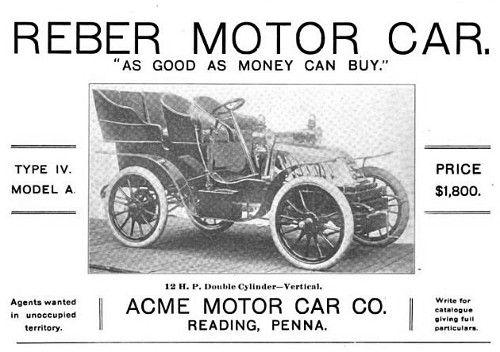
1903 Reber Type IV advertisement

== See also ==
- Acme - successor to the Reber
- The Reber Automobile - article by Michael F. Reber
- 1900 Reber Motor Carriage prototype at the Reynolds-Alberta Museum
