= Edgar Apperson =

American automobile manufacturer

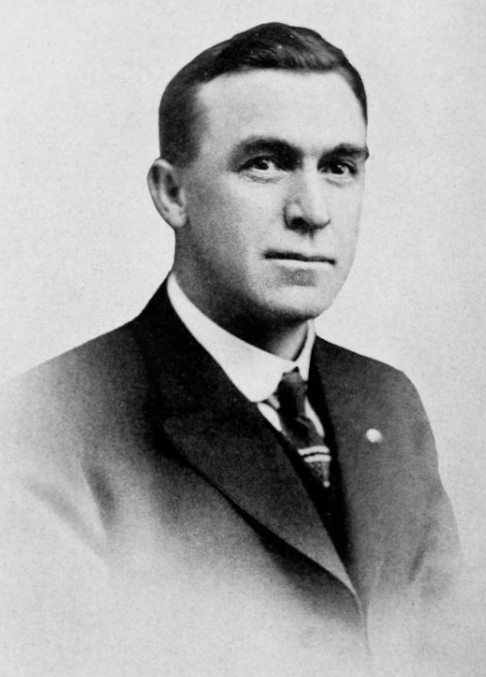
- c. 1919
- Born: October 3, 1870; Howard County, Indiana, US
- Died: May 12, 1959 (aged 88); Phoenix, Arizona, US
- Occupation: Automobile engineer
- Years active: 1880s–1950s
- Known for: Apperson Brothers Automobile Company

Edgar Apperson (October 3, 1870 – May 12, 1959) was an American automobile manufacturer and engineer.

He, along with his brother Elmer, was the first to create one of the world's first horseless carriages, and Edgar was the first to install the anti-friction bearings and opposed cylinder gasoline engine and the first to design carburetors with needle valves and originator of the double ignition system in 1904.

== Life and career ==
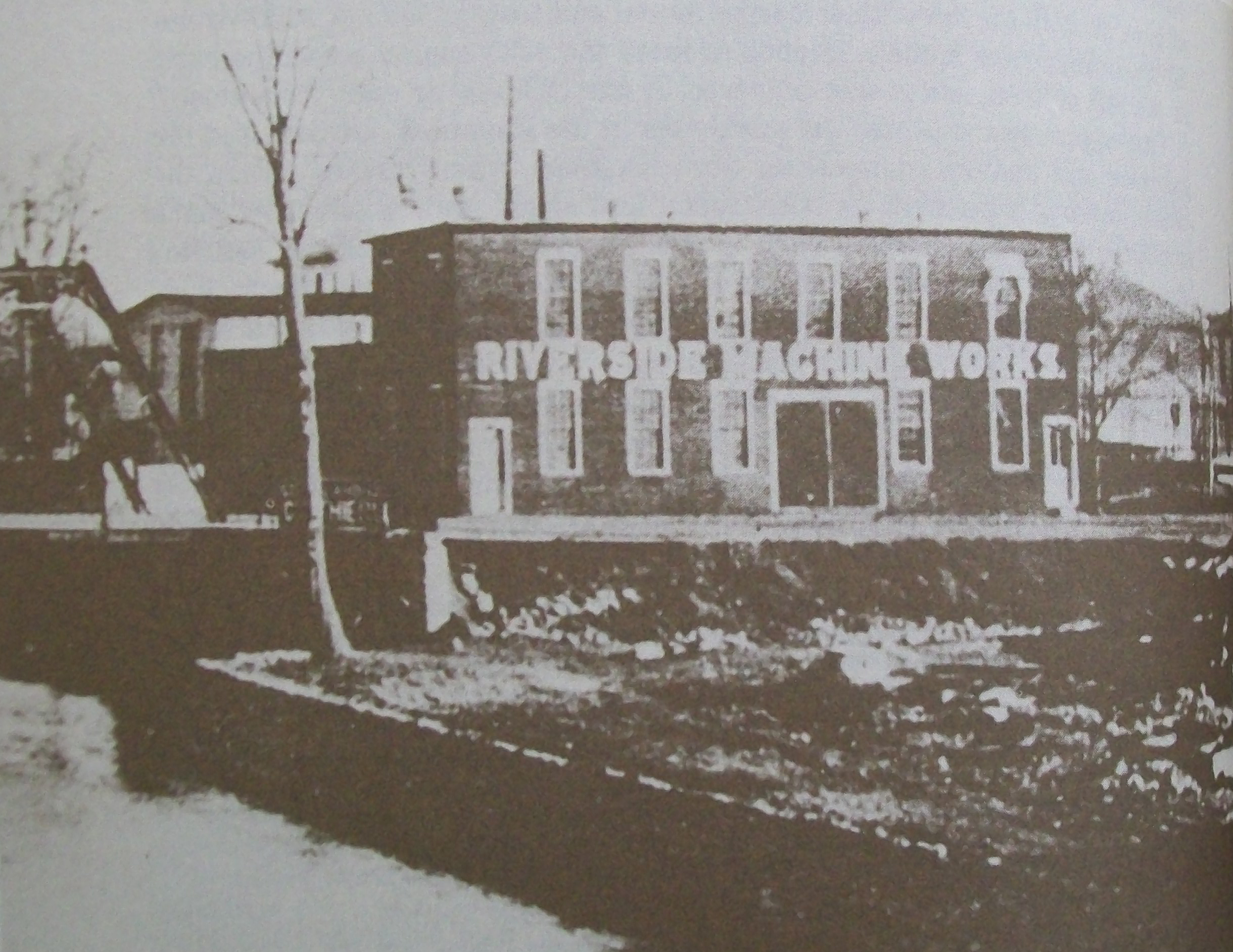
Riverside Machine Works, Kokomo, Indiana, circa 1885

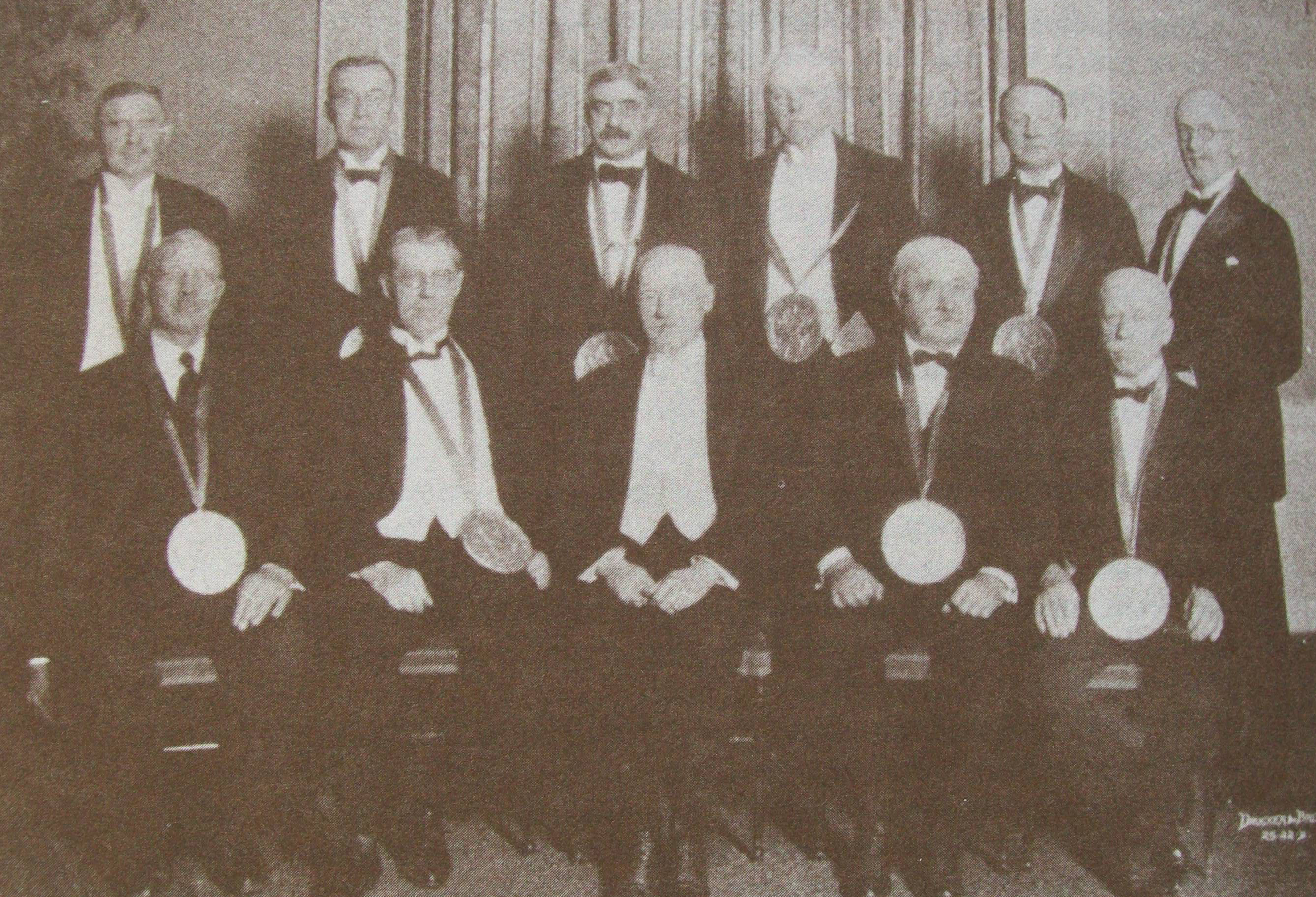
Apperson, back row, third from left, at Automobile Manufacturers' Association gold medal awarding in January 1925

He was born on October 3, 1870, in Howard County, Indiana, the son of Elbert and Anne Apperson. He started working with engineering and mechanics when, while attending high school, he started apprenticing at his brother's machine shop and also made and fixed bicycles at his own shop. Edgar married his wife, Laura Pentecost, on April 12, 1892. In 1889, Edgar and his older brother Elmer founded the Riverside Machine Works, which manufactured bicycles and farm machinery. At the age of 24, they, along with Elwood Haynes, put a gasoline powered marine engine onto a buggy and created one of the world's first "horseless carriages". At the time, Edgar had been working at a natural gas company and brought home plans for a motorized buggy with a gasoline marine engine. On July 4, 1894, Edgar test drove the automobile from Kokomo to New York City for the first time, which had a maximum speed of eight miles per hour and, after establishing they would be able to sell these cars to the public, the Haynes-Apperson Company was created. The first year the small company sold nearly a dozen automobiles and, in 1898, the brothers partnered with Elwood Haynes but the partnership soon dissolved. The following year, they both drove the car 750 miles to Brooklyn, New York to a customer, Dr. Ashley A. Webber, and the journey took 21 days of which 10 consisted entirely of driving. Ironically, though, they had no engine trouble and only ever experienced one flat tire, Ashley Webber couldn't navigate the machine and later returned it. Edgar once also delivered a car to Cornelius Vanderbilt's son-in-law in Saratoga Springs, New York, and even taught that son-in-law how to drive. Apperson said of the experience, "Each day I'd teach him to drive, but it was slow work. Once he drove the car into its place in the carriage house, stepped on the throttle, yelled 'Whoa!' and went through the rear wall. When I left he gave a twenty-year gold pass, Pullman fares included, for myself and family on the New York Central System".

In 1901, the Apperson brothers decided to move in a new direction and created their own company, the Apperson Brothers Automobile Company. In 1902, the brothers were selling a two-cylinder and 2,500 pound car at $3,500, the most expensive automobile at the time, until the following year, when they produced a 50-horsepower limousine at a selling price of $7,500. Both autos were chain driven and had four cylinders and armored wood chassis. The most successful model was the "Jack Rabbit" cars, developed in 1908.

Apperson also participated at the Charles River Speedway and in his first, he won the third of a mile race with his two-passenger high-speed 30 mph model on the track. The track was mainly used for bicycles and Apperson said of the race: "We didn't go so fast, but made an awful lot of noise". He later also competed in a 100-mile non-stop race, using five gallons of fuel and covering 100 miles, during a rainy and muddy day in Long Island, New York in 1901, winning a blue ribbon. That same year, he also raced at the Pan-American Exposition in New York and but was stopped before the scheduled end because of President William McKinley's attempted assassination. Eventually after retiring, he continued driving his cars around Kokomo until 1915 and, to exhibit the quality of Apperson automobiles while visiting a showroom, he once laid a Persian carpet on the floor and ran the motor for days and not a drop of oil touched the carpet. In a 1914 catalog, Apperson said of this Apperson quality, "My brother and I had one central dominating thought - to make cars that were mechanically perfect" and Apperson strove for perfection despite the lack of technology at the time. Once he was driving a five miles an hour in Salt Lake City, Utah when he was fined $10 for speeding and said it "was damn fine advertising". In 1916, while visiting a childhood friend in Phoenix, Arizona, he bought some property for retirement.

However, when his brother Elmer had a stroke in 1917, he took more control of the company and became the general manager. He accepted an award for his brother from the Press Club of Indiana after they were honored for "their achievement in building the first practically commercially successful American automobile". In 1918, Edgar Apperson started making a new model for the company's 25th anniversary, an automobile that would now have V-type fan belt and pulley and a gearshift above the steering wheel instead of the floorboard. With Elmer's death in 1920 at an auto race in Los Angeles, Edgar was named president of the company and the company would ultimately become troubled in 1922 such as a new president, Don C. McCord, who would remove the name "Apperson" from the company and would lead Edgar Apperson to retire from the company a year later. His company would go bankrupt a year later in July 1926 while the new owners wanted to increase production. Apperson retired to Wisconsin until returning to Phoenix, Arizona where he would invest in farm lands of Salt River Valley until his death in Phoenix on May 12, 1959.

In the 1930s, a crude model of the Apperson Brothers car was displayed at the Smithsonian Institution in Washington, D.C.
