= Acme, Michigan =

- Unincorporated community
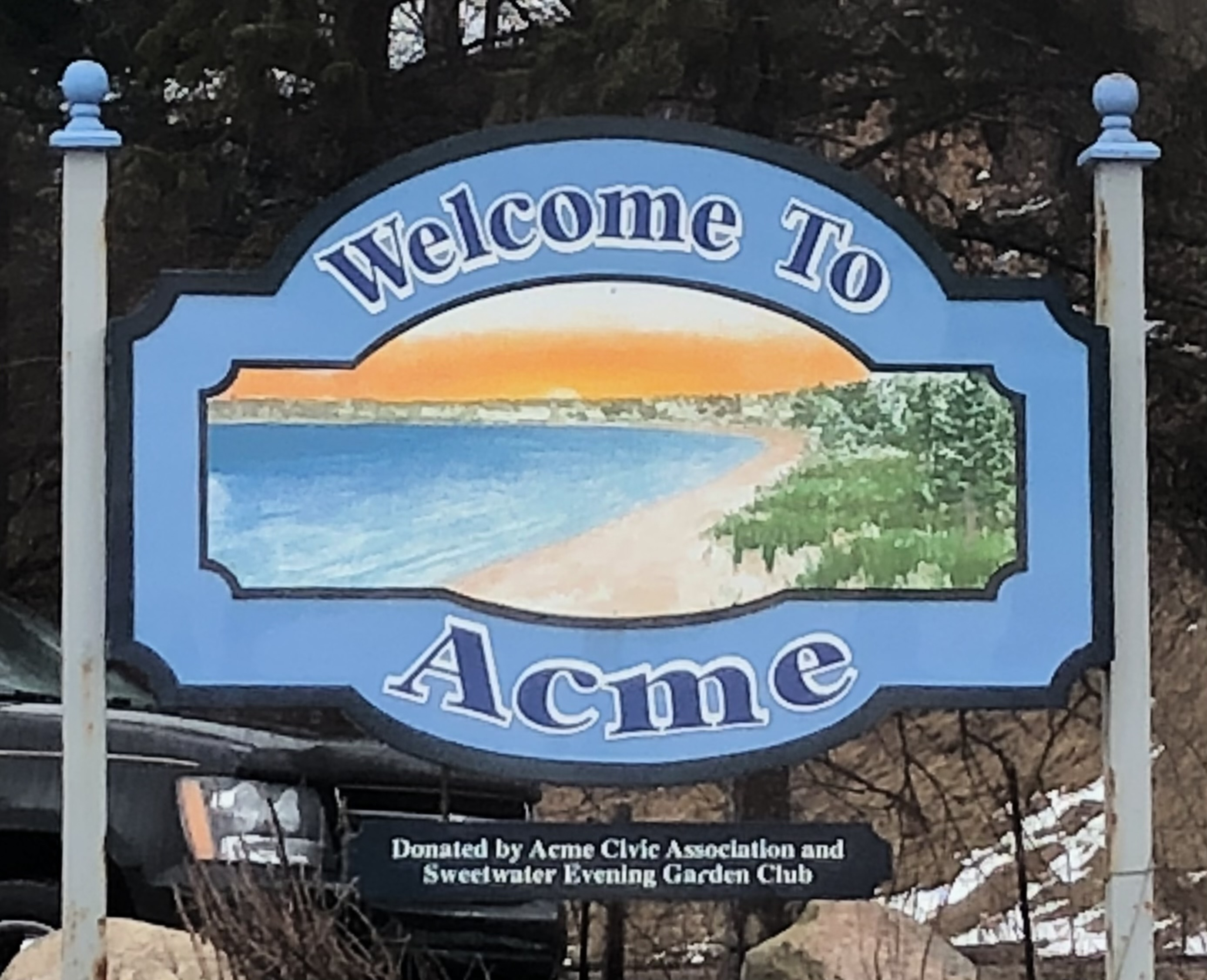
- Signage along US 31/M-72

- Location within Michigan Location within the United States
- Coordinates: 44°46′19″N 85°30′05″W
- Country: United States
- State: Michigan
- County: Grand Traverse
- Township: Acme
- Settled: 1869
- Elevation: 591 ft (180 m)
- Time zone: UTC-5 (Eastern (EST))
  - Summer (DST): UTC-4 (EDT)
- ZIP code(s): 49610; 49696 (Williamsburg)
- Area code: 231
- GNIS feature ID: 619807

Acme (/ˈækmiː/ ACK-mee) is an unincorporated community in Grand Traverse County in the U.S. state of Michigan. It is located on the shore of the East Arm of Grand Traverse Bay, located within Acme Township. It is part of the urban area of Traverse City. Acme is home to the Grand Traverse Resort & Spa.

== History ==
Acme was established by L S. Hoxie from Saratoga County, New York, who, after arriving here in 1864, purchased land and platted the settlement. Alburtus T. Hoxie, son of L.S., became the first postmaster of Acme in 1869. The post office had opened as "Whitewater" on July 16, 1857, but was renamed on June 10, 1869. Acme takes its name from a Greek word, acme, meaning "summit".

In 1892, an extension of the Chicago and West Michigan Railway from Traverse City to Petoskey was built through Acme.

Acme's post office closed on February 15, 1933. However, it was reestablished on February 1, 1952.

In 1986, the tallest building in Grand Traverse County, the tower at the Grand Traverse Resort & Spa, opened in Acme.

== Geography ==
Acme is part of Northern Michigan. It is located in southwestern Acme Township, in northeastern Grand Traverse County. It lies upon the eastern shore of the East Arm of Grand Traverse Bay, a bay of Lake Michigan. The community is located at the mouth of the eponymous Acme Creek.

=== Major highways ===
- US 31 runs south–north through the community. To the south, the highway runs through Traverse City, and further down the Lake Michigan coast. To the north, US 31 runs through Elk Rapids towards Charlevoix, Petoskey, and the Mackinac Bridge.
- M-72 intersects US 31 in the heart of the community. It follows US 31 south and west to Traverse City, and to the east, runs through Williamsburg toward Kalkaska and Grayling.

== Education ==
Acme is part of the Traverse City Area Public Schools district. The nearest public high school is Traverse City Central High School. Bertha Vos Elementary School, located within the community, served local elementary students until 2008.

== See also ==
- Cherry production in Michigan
