= Yuba, Michigan =

- Unincorporated community
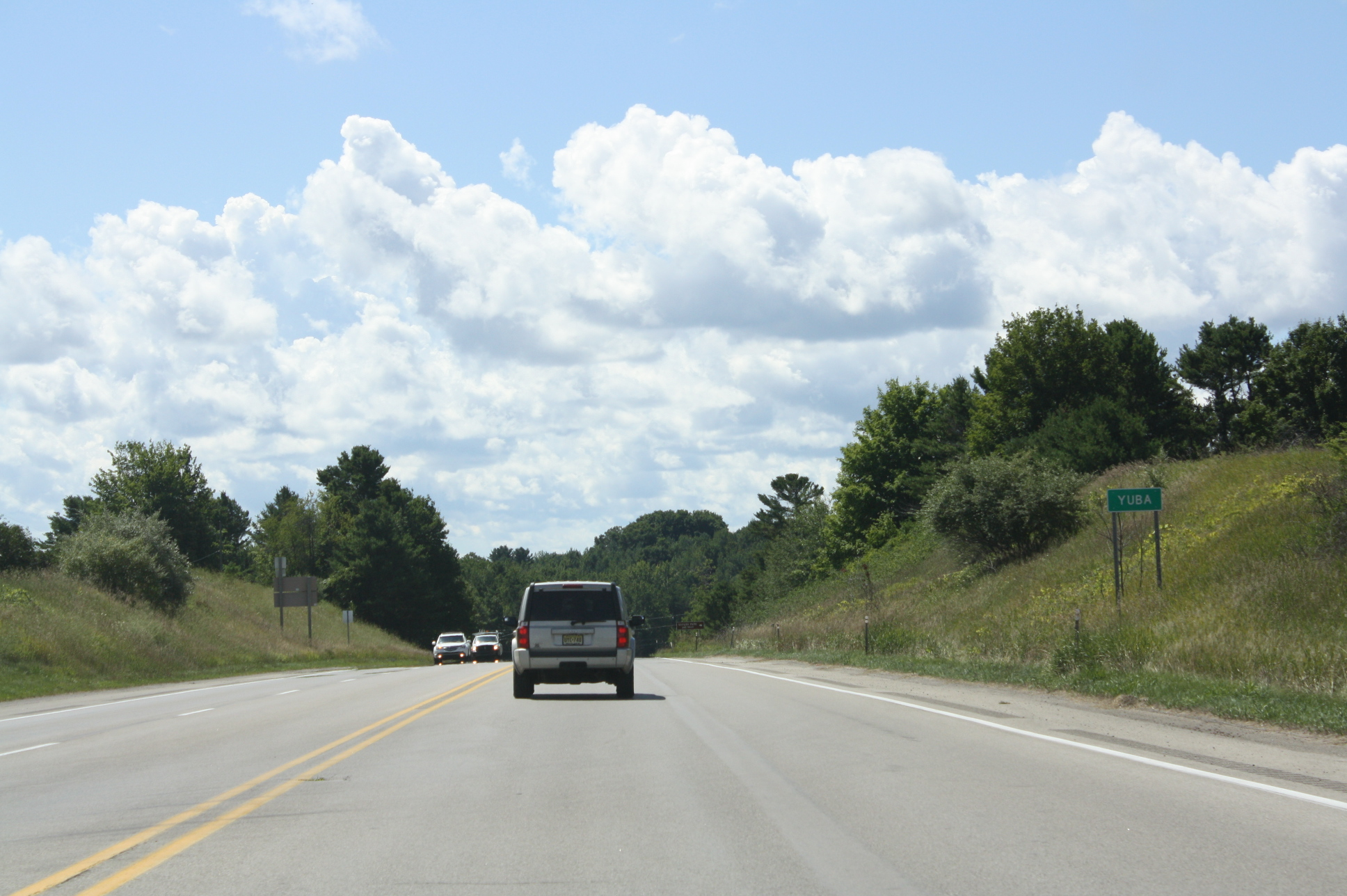
- Yuba along U.S. Route 31

- Location within the state of Michigan
- Coordinates: 44°49′24″N 85°27′33″W
- Country: United States
- State: Michigan
- County: Grand Traverse
- Township: Acme
- Elevation: 607 ft (185 m)
- Time zone: UTC-5 (Eastern (EST))
  - Summer (DST): UTC-4 (EDT)
- ZIP Code: 49690
- Area code: 231
- GNIS feature ID: 1617958

Yuba is a small unincorporated community in the Lower Peninsula of the U.S. state of Michigan. Yuba is a part of Grand Traverse County, and is located in Acme Township along U.S. Highway 31. Yuba rests on the eastern shore of Lake Michigan's Grand Traverse Bay.

== History ==
Yuba was first settled in by David R. Curtis in 1852. A post office was open in Yuba from 1865 to 1904. The nearby village of Fife Lake was named for William H. Fife, the first postmaster at Yuba.

== Geography ==
Yuba lies on the shore of the East Arm off Grand Traverse Bay, a bay of Lake Michigan. The town lies about 4.4 miles (7.1 km) northwest of Williamsburg, about 4.8 miles (7.7 km) south of Elk Rapids, and about 7.4 miles (11.9 km) northeast of Traverse City. US Highway 31 runs directly through Yuba, and can be used to access Elk Rapids and Traverse City.
