= Acme (1876) =

Schooner built in Sydney, Australia

History
- Name: Acme
- Owner: Edward Davis & David Copper
- Port of registry: Sydney
- Ship registration number: 14/1876
- Ship official number: 73348
- Builder: Edward Davis Brisbane Water, New South Wales, Australia
- Completed: 1876
- Fate: Wrecked

General characteristics
- Type: Wood Top sail schooner
- Tonnage: 55 GRT
- Displacement: 55 NRT
- Length: 20.57 m
- Beam: 5.882 m
- Draught: 2.133 m
- Ship primary use: Transport
- Ship industry: cargo - coastal
- Crew: 5

The Acme was a wooden top sail schooner that was driven ashore at Seal Rocks, New South Wales while carrying timber from Camden Haven to Sydney under the command of Captain James Henry Jackson on the 15 July 1876. There were no casualties.

The wreck has not been located, but the approximate coordinates of the wreck site are 32.45°S 152.54°E.
