= Acme, West Virginia =

Unincorporated community in West Virginia, United States

- Unincorporated community
- Location in West Virginia and the United States Acme (the United States)
- Coordinates: 38°2′12″N 81°27′20″W
- Country: United States
- State: West Virginia
- County: Kanawha
- Elevation: 709 ft (216 m)
- Time zone: UTC-5 (Eastern (EST))
  - Summer (DST): UTC-4 (EDT)
- GNIS ID: 1553689

Acme is an unincorporated community in Kanawha County, West Virginia, United States. Acme is located along Tenmile Fork and Cabin Creek Road (West Virginia Secondary Route 79/3).
