= Apperson =

Defunct US automobile manufacturer

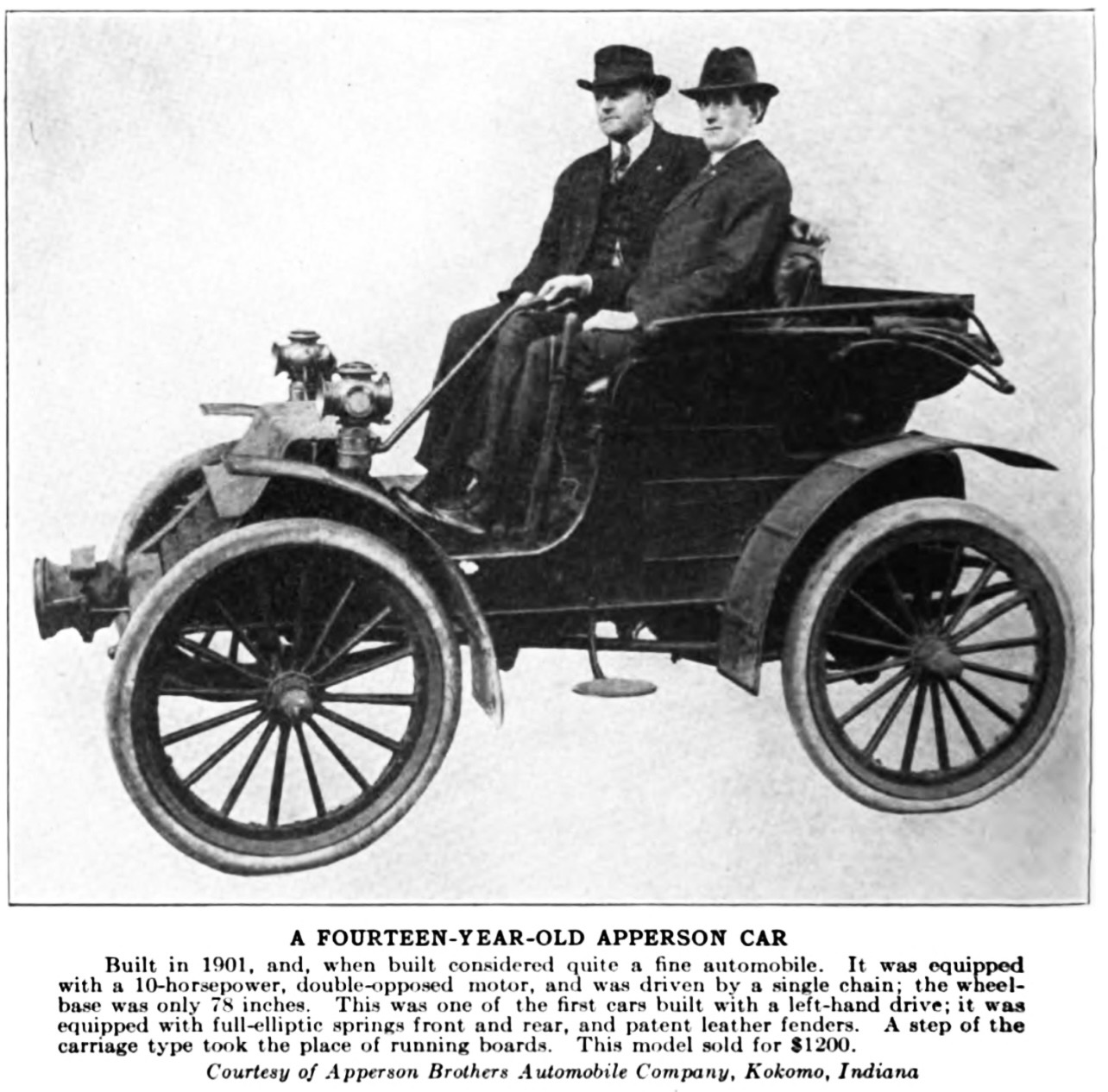
Apperson (1901)

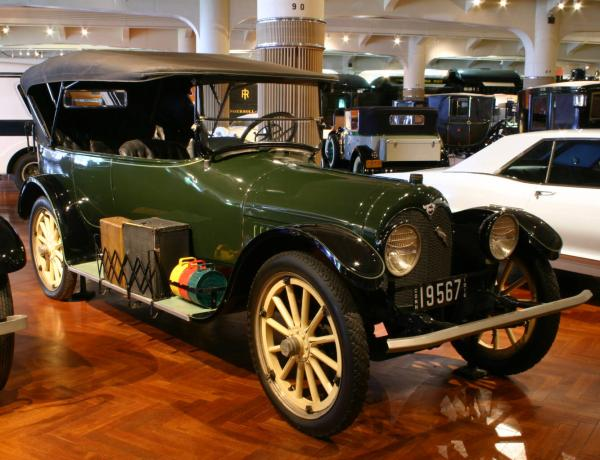
1916 Apperson Jack Rabbit Touring Car

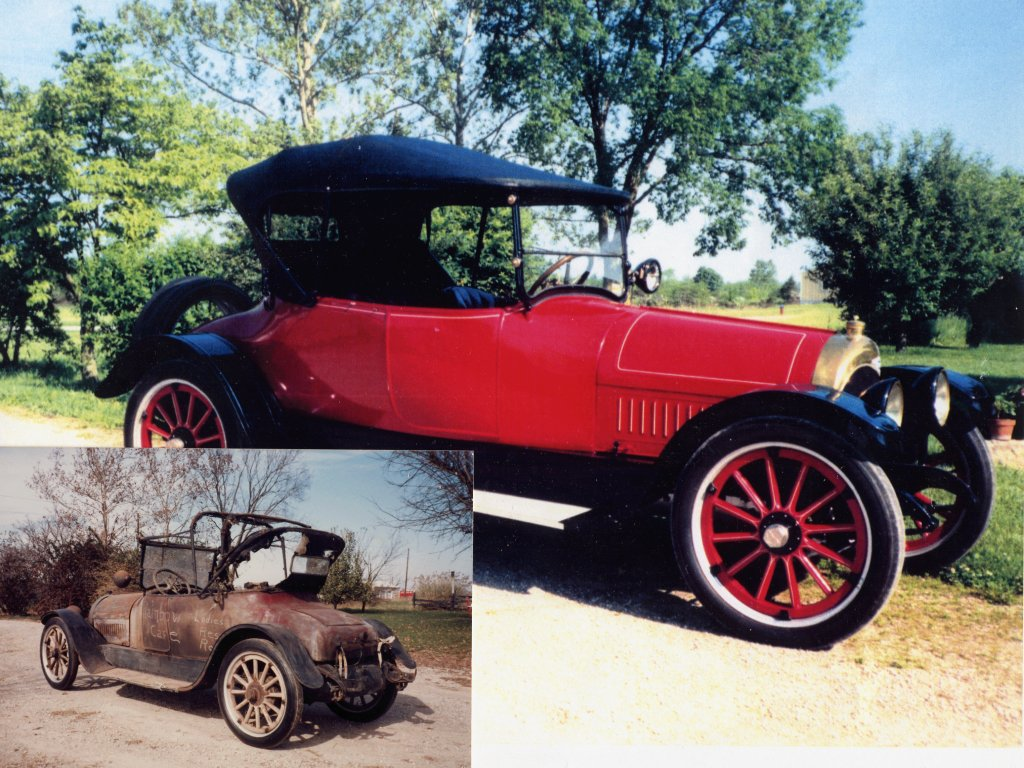
Apperson Chummy Roadster

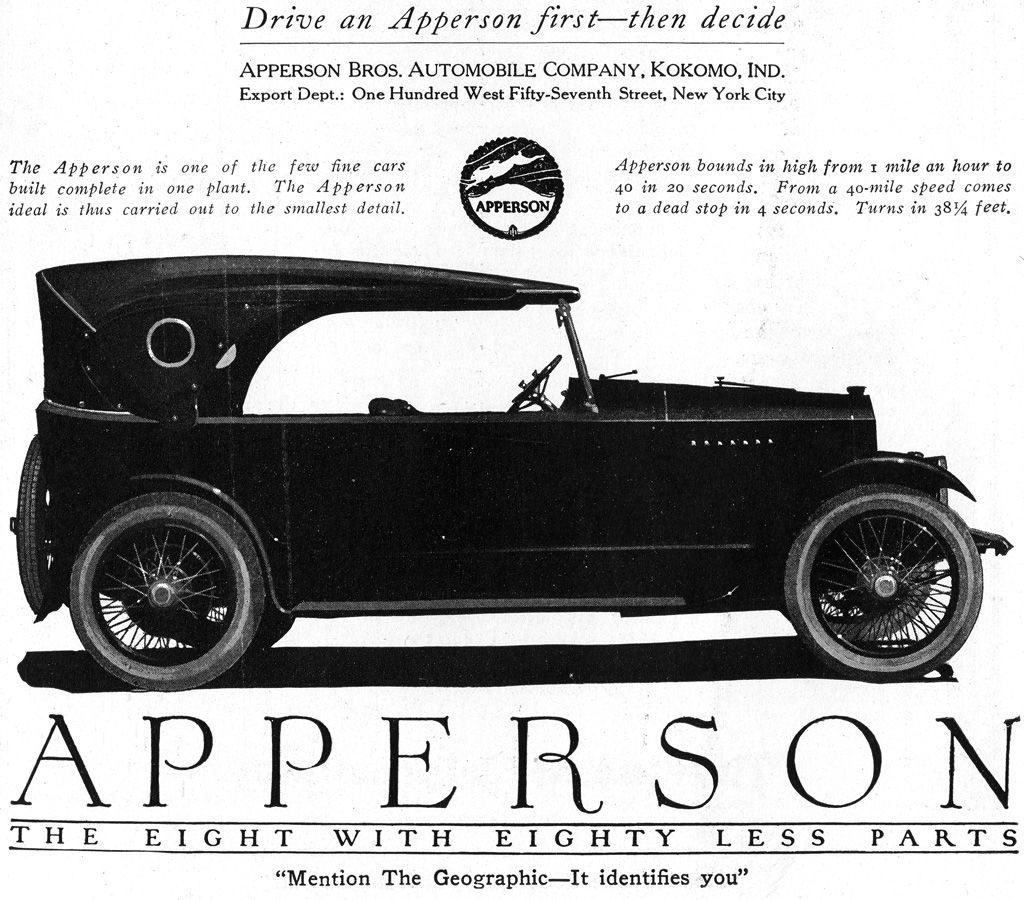
1920 Apperson advertisement

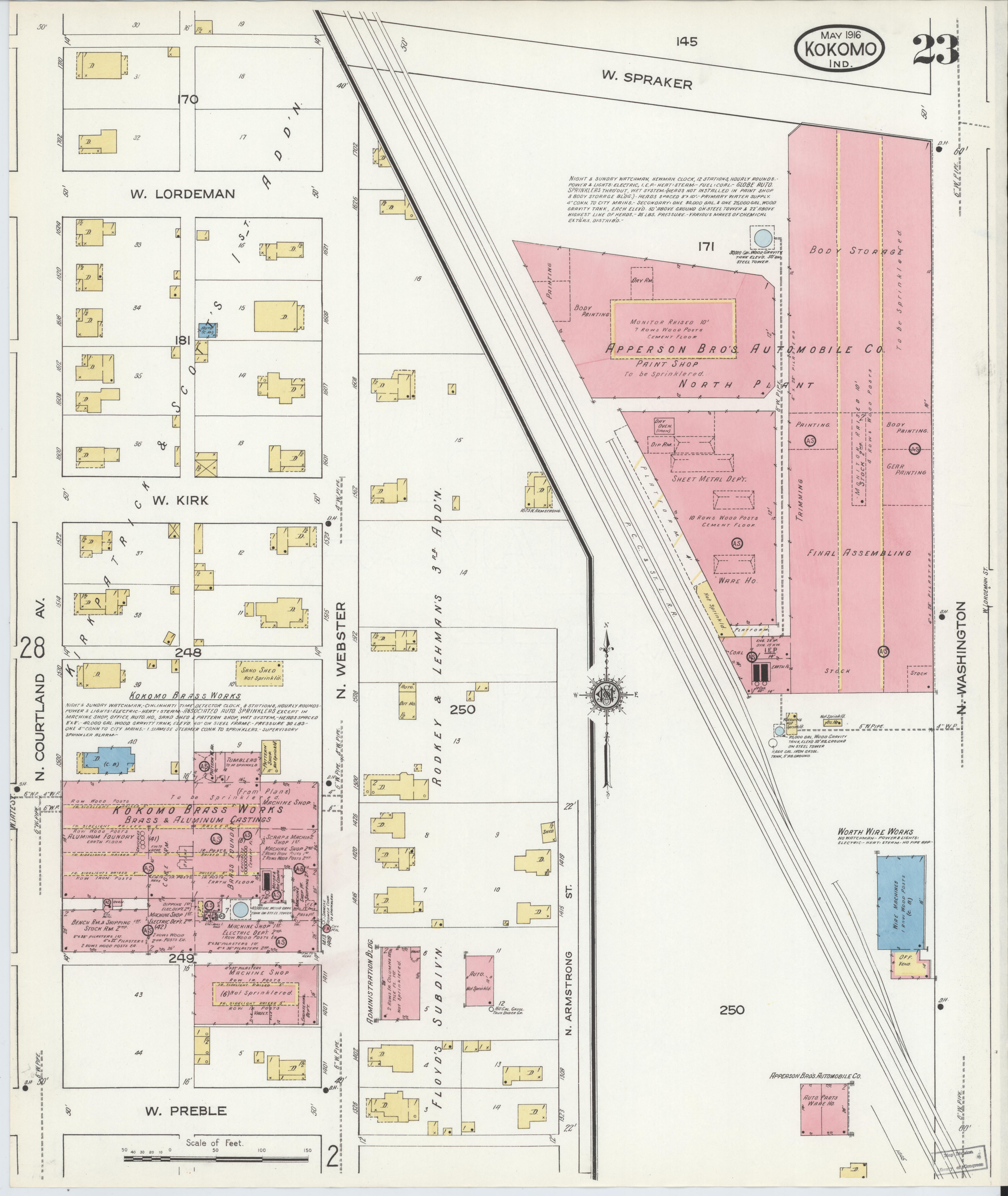
Apperson north plant (1916)

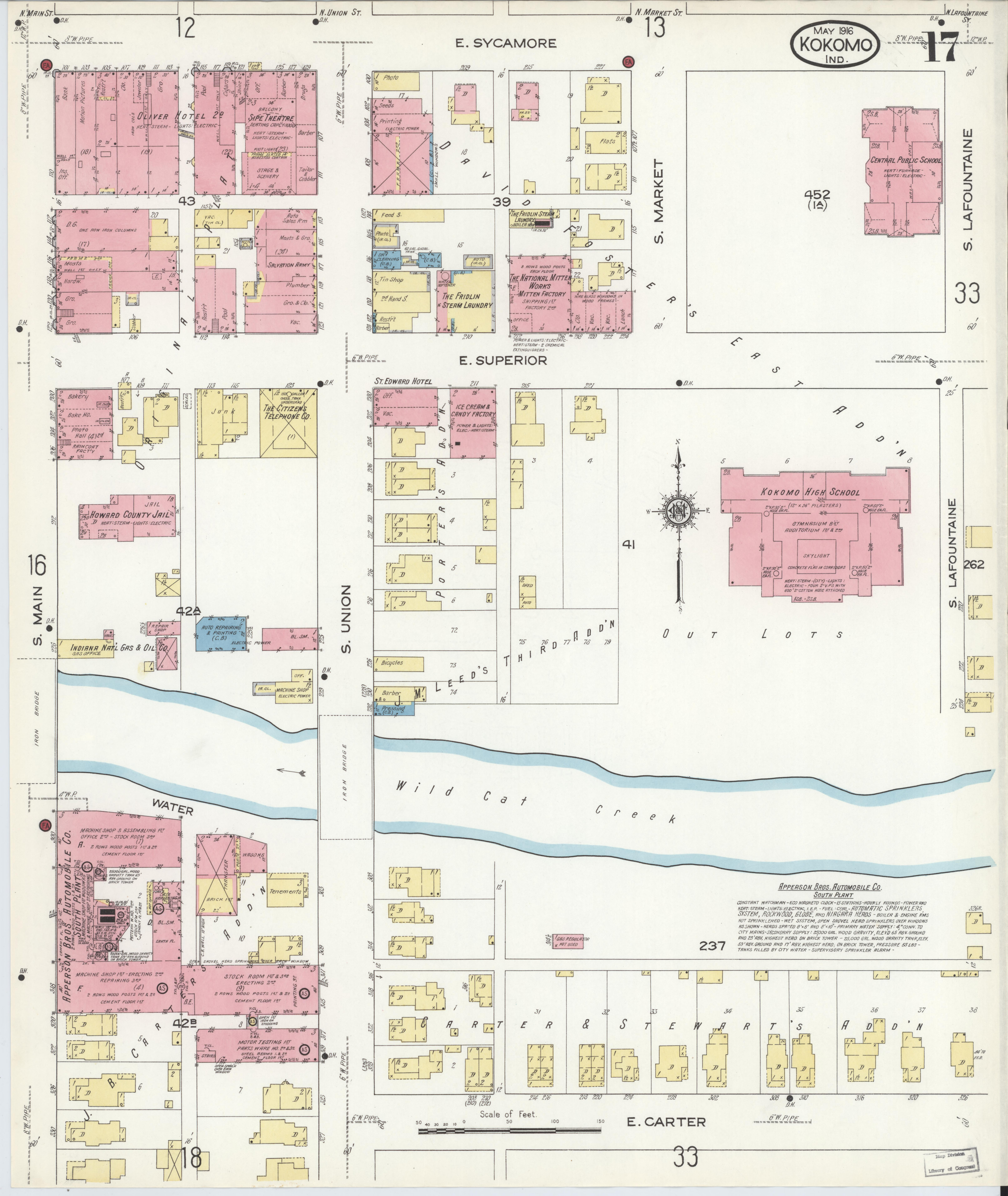
Apperson south plant (1916)

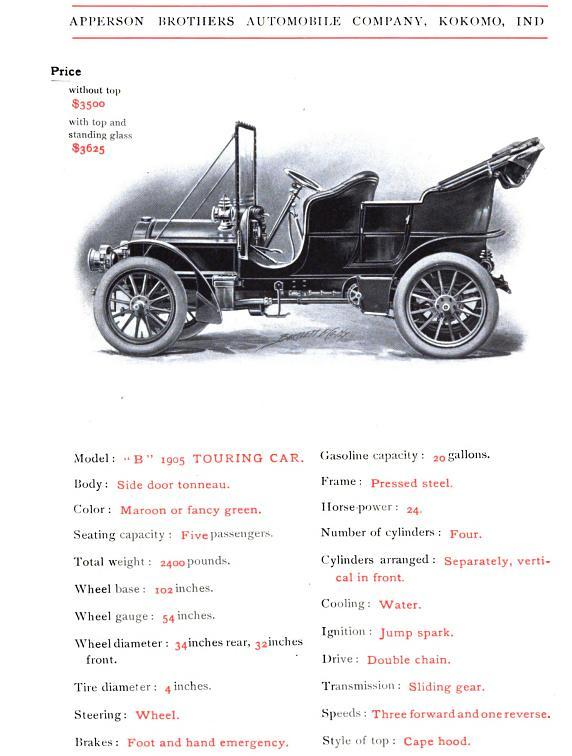
1905 Apperson Model B touring Car

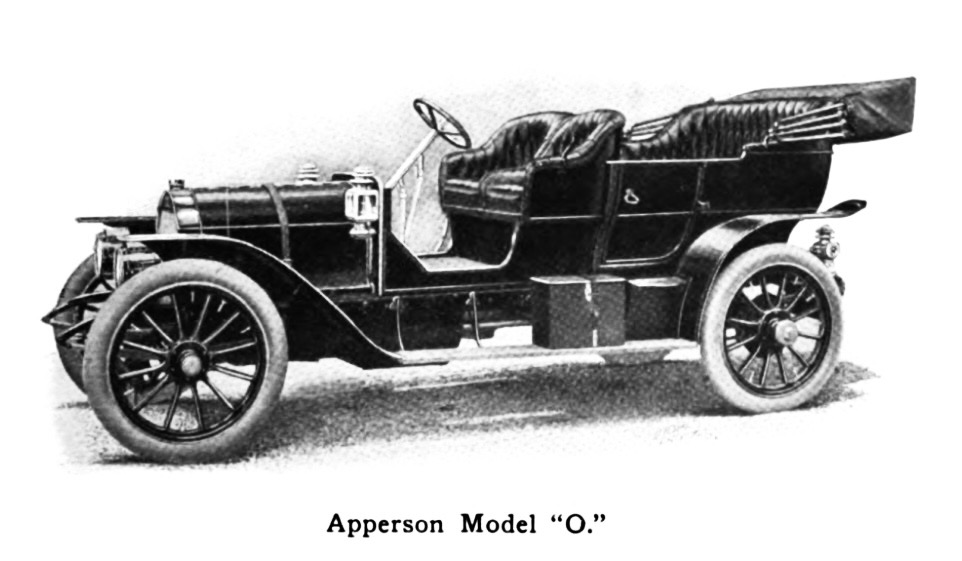
Apperson Model O (1909)

The Apperson was a brand of American automobile manufactured from 1901 to 1926 in Kokomo, Indiana.

== Company history ==
The company was founded by the brothers Edgar and Elmer Apperson shortly after they left Haynes-Apperson; for a time they continued to use a FR layout-mounted flat-twin engine, following it with a horizontal four.

== Apperson cars ==
In 1904, Apperson offered vertical fours in two models. The 1904 Apperson Touring Car was a touring car model. Equipped with a tonneau, it could seat 6 passengers and sold for US$6000. The vertical-mounted straight-4, situated at the front of the car, produced 40 hp (29.8 kW). A 4-speed transmission was fitted. The steel-framed car weighed 2800 lb (1270 kg). The wheel base was 96 inches. The Apperson offered electric lights, a novelty for the time, and used a modern cellular radiator. The 25 hp (18.6 kW) version weighed 1800 lb (816 kg) and sold for US$3500.

In 1906 the company cataloged a 95 hp (71 kW) four at $10,500. The next year the first of the famed Jackrabbit speedsters rolled off the line; this was a 60 hp (45 kW) that sold for $5000. For a time, the entire range was known as the "Jack Rabbit" - in 1913 a 32.4 hp (24 kW) four and a 33.7 hp (25 kW) six were listed, and a 33.8 hp (25 kW) 90-degree V-8 of 5.5 L (5502 cc/335 in^{3}) followed in 1914.

== Roadplane models introduced ==
In 1916 the company announced production of the "Roadplane" six and eights. The term "Roadplane" did not refer to a specific model but was a marketing concept devised by Elmer Apperson that was applied to the "Chummy Roadster" and the "Touring" car. Elmer took the unusual step of patenting the "Chummy Roadster" design (see:"U.S. Patent 48359").

The "Silver-Apperson", designed by Conover T. Silver, was launched in 1917; the model was known as the "Anniversary" after 1919. A sedan proprietary with six cylinders of 3.2 L (3243 cc/197 in^{3}) appeared in 1923, and a Lycoming eight-cylinder was offered beginning in 1924.

== Final production ==
By 1924, Apperson and Haynes were both losing sales; a rumored remarriage came to naught, and Apperson folded for good despite the introduction of four-wheel brakes on the 1926 models.

== Apperson production models ==
For specifications on various Apperson models:

- Apperson Six Sport Sedan

Model	production	cylinder	horse power	wheel base	serial numbers
A	1902–1903	2	16–25 bhp (11,8–18,4 kW)	2590 mm	
B	1903	2	20 bhp (14,7 kW)	2590 mm	
A	1904–1905	4	40 bhp (29 kW)	2743–2896 mm	
B	1904–1905	4	24 bhp (17,6 kW)	2590 mm	
Special	1905	4	50 bhp (37 kW)	2896 mm	
A	1906–1907	4	55 bhp (40 kW)	2921–2946 mm	
B	1906–1907	4	45 bhp (33 kW)	2845–2896 mm	
C	1906	4	35 bhp (26 kW)	2642 mm	
D	1906	4	95 bhp (70 kW)	2642 mm	
Special	1907	4	96 bhp (71 kW)	2794 mm	
K Jack Rabbit	1908–1909	4	55 bhp (40 kW)	2896 mm	
M	1908–1909	4	35–40 bhp (26–29 kW)	2705–3023 mm	
S	1908	4	55 bhp (40 kW)	2896 mm	
I	1909	4	40 bhp (29 kW)	3251 mm	
O	1909	4	30 bhp (22 kW)	3023 mm	
4-30 (Jack Rabbit)	1910–1911	4	30–32,4 bhp (22–23,8 kW)	2896–3023 mm	
4-40	1910–1911	4	40 bhp (29 kW)	3099 mm	
4-50	1910–1911	4	50 bhp (37 kW)	3251 mm	
Jack Rabbit	1910	4	50 bhp (37 kW)	2946 mm	
4-45	1912–1915	4	32–45 bhp (23,5–33 kW)	2896–3048 mm	
4-55	1912–1913	4	55 bhp (40 kW)	2997 mm	
4-65	1912	4	65 bhp (48 kW)	3251 mm	
Light 4-45	1914	4	32 bhp (23,5 kW)	2946 mm	
6-45	1914–1915	6	29–38 bhp (21,3–28 kW)	3099–3251 mm	6300 to 6400 and 10000 to 12000
6-55	1914	6	43 bhp (31,6 kW)	3251 mm	
6-48	1915	6	29 bhp (21,3 kW)	3200 mm	
6-16	1916	6	29 bhp (21,3 kW)	3251 mm	15000 to 17000
8-16	1916	8 V	31 bhp (23 kW)	3251 mm	12000 to 13000
6-17 / 6-18	1917–1918	6	29,4 bhp (21,6 kW)	3302 mm	15000 to 17000
8-17 / 8-18 / 8-19	1917–1919	8 V	31–33,8 bhp (23–25 kW)	3302 mm—	13000 to 15000
Anniversary / 8-20	1920	8 V	60 bhp (44 kW)	3302 mm	
8-21 / Beverly	1921–1922	8 V	70 bhp (51 kW)	3302 mm	
6-23 / 6-24 / 6-25 / 6-26	1923–1926	6	46 bhp (34 kW)	3048 mm	
8-23 / 8-24 / V-Type Eight	1923–1925	8 V	60–70 bhp (44–51 kW)	3302 mm	
Straightaway Eight / Eight	1925–1926	8	60–65 bhp (44–48 kW)	3048–3302 mm	
