= Acme (automobile) =

Defunct American motor vehicle manufacturer

Acme Motor Car Company
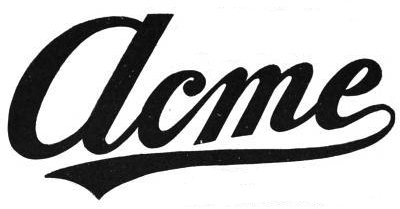
- Industry: Automobile
- Genre: Touring cars
- Predecessor: Reber Manufacturing Company
- Founded: 1903
- Defunct: 1911
- Fate: Sold to SGV (1911)
- Successor: SGV Company
- Headquarters: Reading, Pennsylvania
- Key people: James C. Reber (founder); Herbert M.Sternbergh; Robert E.Graham; Fred Van Tine
- Products: automobiles bicycles

The Acme was a make of American automobiles made in Reading, Pennsylvania from 1903 to 1911. They were the successor of the Reber which was made from 1902 to 1903 by Reber Manufacturing.

== Etymology ==
Acme (ακμή; English transliteration: akmē) is Ancient Greek for "(highest) point, edge; peak of anything", being used in English with the meaning of "prime" or "the best", initially when referring to a period in someone's life and then extending to anything or anyone who reaches perfection in a certain regard.

== History ==
In June 1903 James C. Reber acquired the old Acme Machine Company's bicycle factory on the corner of Eighth and Elm Streets, Reading for US$47,000 at a receivership auction of the American Bicycle Company. Reber owned Reber Manufacturing, an automobile manufacturer, and stated that he was going to use the factory to manufacture automobiles. With the purchase of this site Reber also announced that Reber Manufacturing was changing its name to the Acme Motor Car Company. The company's directors were James C Reber, George D Horst, Jacob Nolde, and John D Horts. The company had $200,000 capital. Leon Schermerhorn was hired as Sales Manager.

Initial output in 1903 was four to six cars per week with the intention of reaching a production of 500 cars per annum. By 1905 they were producing between two or three automobiles daily.

Acme exhibited its cars at the Chicago and New York Automobile Shows from 1904 to 1907. The company was one of the founding members of the American Motor Car Manufacturers Association.

=== Frank Devlin ===
In November 1905 the company was taken over by Frank A Devlin of Devlin and Co, Chicago. Devlin owned Carson, Pirie, Scott, and Co one of America's largest jobbing houses. The purchase price was rumored to have been $250,000. The new owners intended to specialize in tourist cars (a touring car, limousine, and landaulette) and delivery wagons.

In October 1908 Devlin was killed in an automobile accident.

=== James C Reber ===
James C Reber went to work for the Keystone Wagon Works in February 1907 as General Manager on a 10-year contract, but they went into receivership in November sparking a lawsuit from Reber which he won. Reber went into poultry farming from that period until 1911, when he began a wholesale tobacco business. Reber died after a period of illness in 1933 aged 65.

== Demise ==
=== Receivership (1906) ===
The firm went into receivership in July 1906 with Daniell J Driscoll appointed receiver by the Court. The plant was kept in operation by the receiver to ensure a reasonable return to its debtors. The business was sold in February 1907 by the receiver to Herbert M Sternbergh for $65,881.12. Sternbergh held interests in the Duryea Power Company. The registered capital was reduced to $5,000.

=== Herbert Sternbergh era ===
Acme introduced its first 6-cylinder car, a touring car called the Sextuplet, at the New York motor show in September 1907. Acme also increased its involvement in motor racing through 1908. In 1909 it introduced a 10-year guarantee on its 6-cylinder models.

In May 1909 an ocean to ocean endurance race, from New York to Seattle was proposed. Sternbergh strongly supported the idea, especially as it would draw attention to the poor condition of transcontinental roading. He hoped it would lead to significant improvements.

=== James Hervey Sternbergh ===
Acme sold its site and plant to J H Sternbergh for $72,100 in May 1911. Sternbergh in turn sold the Acme Motor Car Company and leased the plant to a New York consortium. The company's name was changed to SGV. Sternbergh died in March 1913.

== Production ==
When the company commenced production at the Elm Street plant it initially planned to make 4 to 6 vehicles per week, with the aim of increasing output to 500 machines per annum. Leon Schermerhorn was appointed sales manager. By 1905 the company was employing 170 men. The plant in Elm Street was sold to F A Devlin of Chicago in June.

In 1907 the company began to test vanadium steel alloy for use in its car parts. They were also using sprags, a bar inserted between the spokes of the wheels as an additional safety mechanism to hold the car in position if it was parked on a slope.

By September 1907 Acme is thought to have made 520 cars since production began at its Elm Street plant. From April 1908 Krupp nickel-steel was used in construction of its transmissions. At that time they also used Eisemann high tension magnetos, Exide batteries, Prestolite gas tanks, and Neverout lamps.

The company's output was quite low with only between 125 and 150 cars planned in 1909.

== Acme Models ==
Types I, II, III are possibly Reber's.

=== Type IV Model A ===
Marketed as the Reber, the 1903 Acme was a tonneau powered by a 12 hp vertical-twin engine fitted to a three speed transmission and double chain drive. It was advertised as costing $1,800. The car weighed 1,650 pounds. Its wheelbase was 78 inches and its width was 54 inches.

=== Type V - Touring Car (1904) ===
A 16 hp car that was advertised for sale at $1,650.

=== Type VI (1905) ===
This model sold for $2,000. It had a 16-horsepower two-cylinder engine. It had an 84-inch wheelbase on a steel chassis. This type was offered with the option of three different bodies styles; a standard touring car, a delivery body, or an enclosed opera sedan.

=== Type VIII (1905) ===
A 30 hp with top and headlights and 4 speed transmission. Priced at $2,750.

=== Type IX (1905) ===
This type sold for $800. It had a single-cylinder 9 horsepower engine on steel chassis with a 76-inch wheel base.

=== Type X Runabout (1905) ===
A 16 hp two seater with a three speed transmission and semi-racing body advertised at $1,000.

=== Type XIV (1906) ===
In 1906, the company was advertising a 5-passenger tonneau in a national trade magazine. Model XIV was a 4-cylinder water cooled 30 to 35-horsepower motor and was priced at US$2,750 with maximum speed of 50 miles per hour (80 km/h). It had a wood body on a pressed steel frame, three speed transmission, double drive chain. Its tank held 18 gallons of petrol. The car weighed 2,200 lbs. The wheel base was 102 inches, tread 56 inches. A top for the car cost an extra $150.

=== Type XV Touring Car (1906) ===
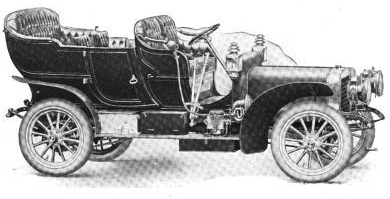
1906 Acme Type XV

The Type XV was priced at US$3,500 ($3,000 in 1908). It was a 7-passenger Touring Car with a 4-cylinder motor of 45 to 50 hp. Maximum speed was 60 miles per hour (97 km/h). It had a wooden body on a pressed steel frame. The car weighed 2,600 lbs. Its wheel base was 114 inches and tread 56 inches. The tyres were 4.5 inch Morgan and Wright on 34 inch diameter wheels. It had a 20-gallon fuel tank.

=== Type XVI (1907) ===
A five-passenger touring which sold for $2,800 and a roadster. Similar to the Type XVIII. Was priced at $3,500 in 1907.

=== Type XVII ===
No details. Possibly the Vanderbilt race car. The car was powered by a bored out six cylinder engine and ran on Truffault-Hartford shock absorbers. It was shorter, 116 inch wheelbase, and lighter than the stock six cylinder cars. Testing began in August 1908.

=== Type XVIII (1908) ===
7 seater touring car which sold for $3,250 in 1908. The $5,000 Landaulet's and Limousine's were possibly versions on this car.

=== Type XIX Midget Runabout (1907) ===
45-50 hp for $3,250 During the year a new 30 hp runabout with a shaft drive was developed along the lines of the 1906 racing car. It was anticipated that it would retail for $2,000. The 1907 advertisements priced it at $3,250, while in mid 1908 it was priced at $1,800. The price rose to $2,500 by the end of 1908.

=== Type XX The Acme Sextuplet (1908) ===
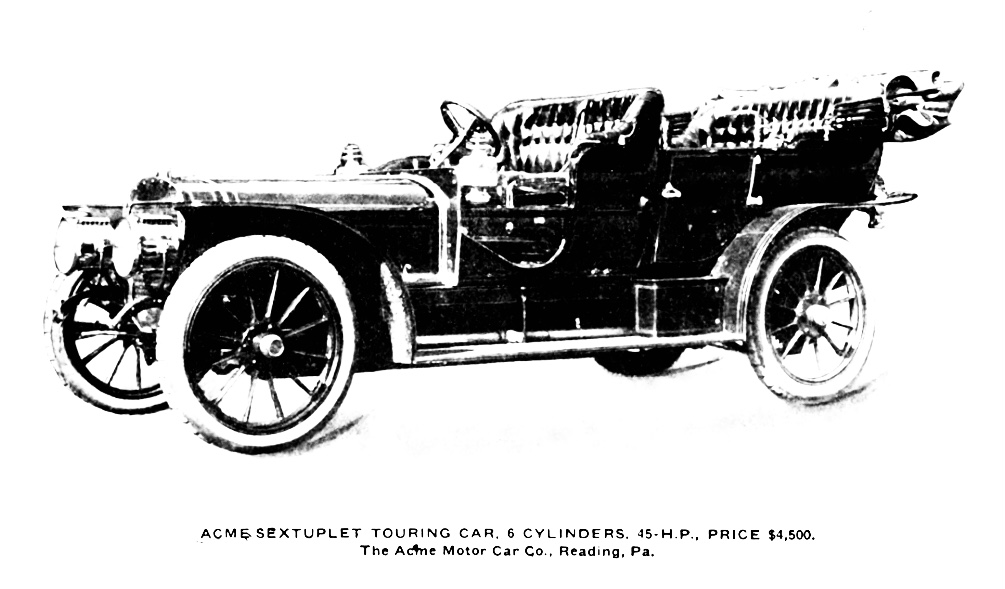
Acme Type XX Sextuplet (1908)

A 5 or 7 passenger Touring Car equipped with a six-cylinder engine and priced at $4500.00. Probably introduced in 1907. In 1908 it was priced at $4,000.

=== Type XXI The Fairmount Sextuplet (1908) ===
A roadster or tourabout equipped with a six-cylinder 45 hp engine and priced at $4500.00. Probably introduced in early 1908. It had a stated top speed of 76 mph. There were three models A, B and C.

=== Type XXV "Vanderbilt" (1908) ===
A car of this type participated in the New York to Boston endurance run on 11 March 1909. It was a 6-cylinder and made as either a 5 or 7 seater selling for $6,000 in 1908.

=== Type XXVI The Standard Quad ===
Two models of four cylinder touring car, A and B. A 5 and 7 seater that sold for $3,500.

=== Type XXVII The Standard Quad (1909) ===
A runabout priced at $3750 equipped with a four-cylinder engine. It had 5 or 7 seats.

=== Type XXVIII ===
A tourabout.

=== Special Sextuplet (1910) ===
The Special was equipped with a six-cylinder 50 horsepower engine and priced at $4,750.

All Acme automobiles came with a year's "absolute binding guarantee."

== SGV (1910) ==
Acme acquired parts from Lancia and made cars under the SGV badge. The model was similar in style to the Lancia Beta Torpedo. Newspapers of the time described the SGV as lightweight and mechanically efficient. The Lancia engine was used and a four speed transmission. The steering radius was noted being small, making the car maneuverable in city traffic.

== Motor Racing ==
Acme entered a car in motor races in Atlanta City on the 26 to 30 April 1906. It was described as a new model that had just been tested. In a 1907 race at Reading the Acme car driven by Edward Lange was beaten by a Pullman driven be Robert Morton.

In 1908 Acme created a new 6 cylinder 45 hp runabout capable of 76 mph, the Type XXI. The company entered the car in the 360 mile long race at Savannah on 18–19 March with Malcolm Newstetter replacing Ed L'Engle as its driver. It also announced that they intended to enter their cars in hill climbing and endurance races, but not races where chance plays a large part. The Acme car came third in a time of 6:47:05. It was beaten by an Italian Isotta Fraschini (6:21:20) and an Apperson (6:44:37).

Acme cars competed in the Land's End Economy Run of the Long Island Automobile Club in early 1908.

Following its good placing in the Savannah race, Acme entered a car in the 1908 Vanderbilt Cup race and began negotiations with Lewis Strang for its driver. The car was to be specially constructed for the race with a larger bore engine than normal. The same car was entered in the Grand Prix of the Automobile Club of America at Savannah with Leonard Zengle as its driver.

A Type XIX won a hill climb at Wilkes-Barre and three events at the New York-based Jamaica speed trials in May or June 1908.

A private owner J H Tyson entered a Type XXI driven by professional Strang in the 1908 Brighton Beach 24 hour race. Acme entered a Type XXV. The car was to be driven by Cyrus Patchke and was also entered in the Fairmount Park 200 mile race on 10 October. A Acme Type XXI came second in the race.

== Advertisements ==
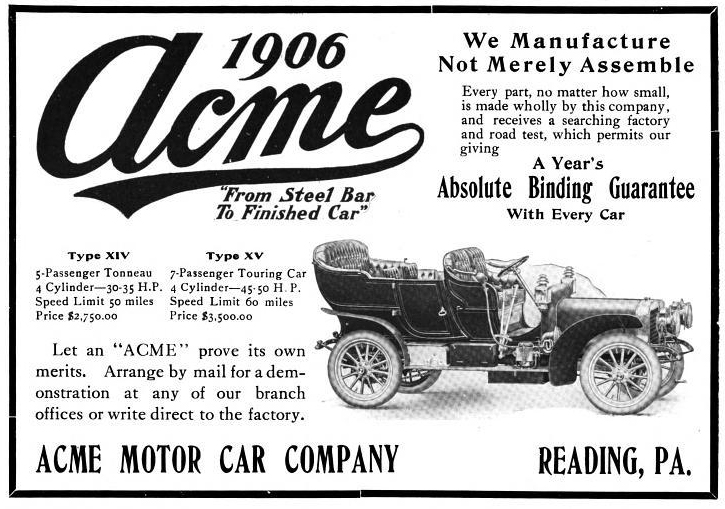
Acme Motor Car Company - 1906.

== Unrelated companies ==
The following companies have the same or similar names, but are not associated with the Reading company.

- Acme Motor Car Company of New York (incorporated 1905) - J Fe Smet Maguire, R Lewis Julian, and George H Stout (Directors)

== See also ==
- Reber (automobile) – predecessor 1902–1903
