= Arginine catabolic mobile element =

The arginine catabolic mobile element (ACME) is a mobile genetic element of Staphylococcus bacterial species. This genetic element provides for several immune modulating functions, including resistance to polyamines which serve as a non-specific immune response both on intact skin and following the inflammatory response in wound healing. Diverse ACME are present in several species of Staphylococcus, including Staphylococcus epidermidis.

== Association with virulent MRSA ==
ACME are not common among antibiotic sensitive S. aureus (MSSA). The elements for the most prominent MRSA ACME appear to have assembled recently in S. epidermidis into the speG-positive ACME which was transferred to virulent S. aureus during the evolution of the epidemic USA300 MRSA strain. This broadened the ability of S. aureus to colonize sites beyond the nose. This strain is able to persist on intact skin and is spread rapidly person-to-person. As a result, the speG-positive ACME is a particularly important element of MRSA pathogenesis.

== See also ==
- Mobile genetic elements
