= Little Cleo =

Spoon lure made by the Acme Tackle Company

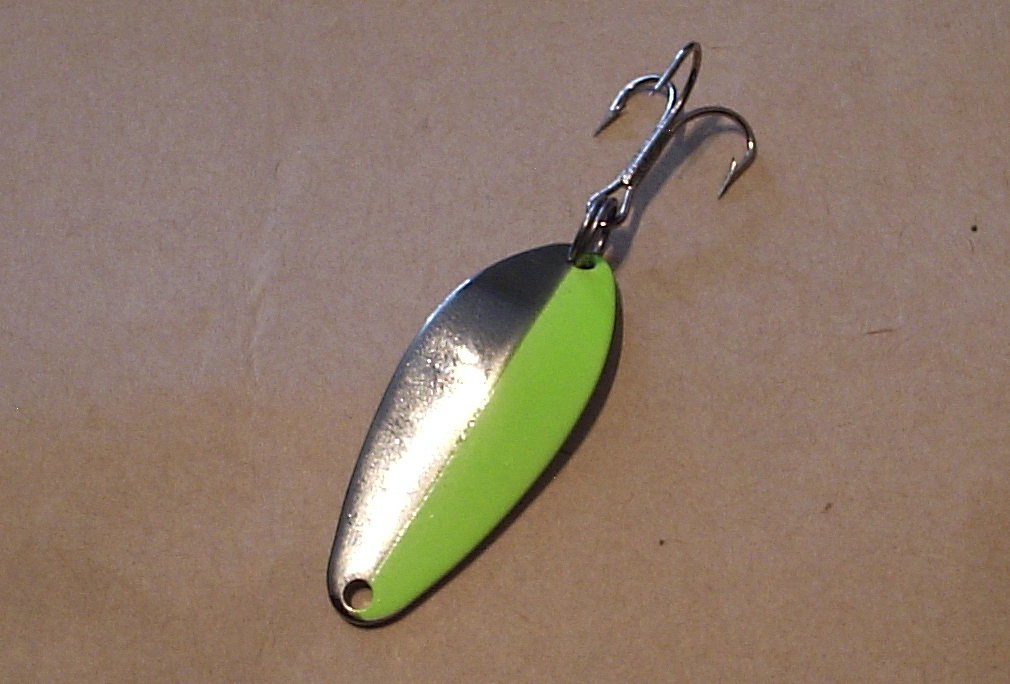
The Little Cleo

The Little Cleo is a small spoon lure made by the Acme Tackle Company which comes in nine sizes from ^{1}/_{16} oz to 1 ^{1}/_{4} oz, and in different color combinations. Created in 1953 by the New York City songwriter C.V. "Charlie" Clark, Little Cleo according to Outdoor Life is one of the most popular lures in use today and is one of the 50 greatest lures of all time according to Field & Stream.

== History ==
C.V. "Charlie" Clark, a songwriter and music publisher based in New York City, founded Seneca Tackle Co. in 1951. Clark observed Little Cleo doing a hoochie coochie dance in the 1930s. In 1953, he created a spoon lure that had a swaying motion, naming it Little Cleo after the dancer he had seen. His rationale was that the fish would be entranced by the bait similar to how he was captivated by Little Cleo the dancer.

Acme Tackle Company, which is based in Rhode Island, purchased Seneca Tackle in 1980. Between 1953 and 1996, the rear of Little Cleo was illustrated with an exotic dancer who was scantily dressed. After a woman who worked at an influential retailer became upset by the image in 1996, the retailer demanded the elimination of the illustration. Acme Tackle stopped printing the illustration on Little Cleo that year to allay the retailer's concerns and maintain them as a buyer. According to Field & Stream's John Merwin, the removal was "for the sake of newfound political correctness". Little Cleos adorned with the exotic dancer were sold as "collector's edition kit[s]". The lures each have "a bucktail-dressed, single O'Shaugnessy hook" and are produced in the colors of gold; chrome; chrome and neon blue; and chrome and neon green.

Little Cleo comes in nine sizes, ranging between ^{1}/_{16} oz and 1 ^{1}/_{4} oz. Because of Little Cleo's thick metal and narrow width, the lure goes deep under the surface of the water. As a result, they are commonly used to fish for trout though can also be used for ensnaring panfish, striped bass, and sand bass. Little Cleo spoons were not built for use in saltwater. A saltwater edition was released in 2000.

== Reception ==
John Merwin of Field & Stream listed the Little Cleo among the "50 best fishing lures of all time". He called it "a great all-around spoon" that is "a deadly secret for deep-dwelling brook trout in early summer". In the Outdoor Life, James Hall called Little Cleo "one of the most popular choices" and said, "Although the paint will become chipped and the hook will need to be replaced from time to time, this bait is basically indestructible."

The author Steven A. Griffin wrote, "Acme's Little Cleo quickly became a favorite when salmon fishing ignited in the Great Lakes almost 30 years ago, and it remains a favorite of many trout and salmon fans there. Its hump-back shape makes it wiggle through the water like a fat bait fish—a meal big fish just can't resist." Rich Giessuebel said in the book Great Fishing in Lake Ontario & Tributaries that the Little Cleo was among the "most popular" lures in the region, writing, "As for the Little Cleos, you will see them fished where anglers have a large concentration of salmon swimming around in a pocket of water in a non-snatching section (such as beneath the power plant in the Oswego River). Here, fishermen cast Cleos with rather low expectations of a salmon actually chasing and striking the lure."
