= USS Acme =

Two ships of United States Navy have been named Acme.

- USS Acme (AMc-61), an Accentor-class minesweeper that was launched on 31 May 1941.
- USS Acme (MSO-508), a minesweeper that was launched on 23 June 1955.
