= Acme Tools =

American tool and equipment retailer

- Formerly: Acme Electric Motor, Inc. (1948–1970); Tool Crib of the North (1970–2005)
- Company type: Privately held company
- Industry: Retailing
- Founded: 1948; 77 years ago Grand Forks, North Dakota, U.S.
- Founder: George Kuhlman
- Headquarters: Grand Forks, North Dakota, U.S.
- Number of locations: 14 stores (as of 2025)
- Area served: United States, North Dakota, Minnesota, Iowa
- Key people: Steve Kuhlman (President of Corporate Operations & Co-Owner); Paul Kuhlman (President of Merchandise Operations & Co-Owner)
- Products: Tools, power tools, hand tools, equipment, lawn mowers, garden tools, apparel, workwear, overhead storage, workspace, home improvement, personal protective equipment, heating, ventilation, and air conditioning, heavy equipment, hardware, automotive, cleaning agents, material-handling equipment
- Brands: Tool Crib of the North; Acme Electric Motor, Inc.
- Number of employees: 650+ (December 2023)
- Divisions: Acme Equipment; Acme Rents
- Website: AcmeTools.com; AcmeUsedEquipment.com; AcmeRents.com

Acme Electric Motor, Inc., often referred to as Acme Tools, is an American family-owned tool and equipment retail business with brick-and-mortar store locations in the Midwestern United States. This company was found in 1948. It first rebranded as Tool Crib of the North in 1970. This company rebranded a second time in 2005 when it adopted the name Acme Tools.

This company is headquartered in Grand Forks, North Dakota and operates twelve Acme Tools and two Acme Equipment locations throughout North Dakota, Minnesota, and Iowa. This company exclusively operates inside the United States of America and employs more than 650+ staff members, as of 2025.

Acme Tools first launched eCommerce operations in 1999, selling the division the same year to Amazon.com. Following the expiration of a 10-year non-compete agreement, Acme Tools relaunched its eCommerce website in 2010. By 2021, this company offered over 300 brands. This included Milwaukee Tool, DEWALT, Makita USA, Bosch, and Husqvarna. In 2023, Acme Tools featured over 900 brands.

== History ==
=== 1948–1969 ===
Acme Electric Motor, Inc. was founded by George Kuhlman in 1948. The company's first location was a 300-square-foot garage in downtown Grand Forks, North Dakota. George Kuhlman named the company after "ACME" because of the term's definition:

ACME – (noun) the point at which someone or something is best, perfect, or most successful.

Three years later in 1951, George Kuhlman moved Acme Electric Motor, Inc. to a larger location, accommodating the mid-1950s expansion opportunities caused by the arrival of contractors tasked with building the Grand Forks Air Force Base and nearby missile sites. George repaired and delivered power tools and hand tools to the contractors' job sites.

George Kuhlman's son, Daniel Kuhlman, was born on November 19, 1941. Although Daniel began working at Acme Electric Motor, Inc. when he was 10 years old, he officially joined the company in 1962. In 1967, the company built a new retail location at 1705 13th Ave N in Grand Forks, ND.

=== 1970–2004 ===
In 1970, Acme Electric Motor, Inc. rebranded, adopting the company name "Acme Electric Tool Crib of the North" and slogan, "Tool Crib of the North". The Tool Crib of the North's first expansion was in Bismarck, North Dakota. In 1979, Bismarck saw an increasing number of oil and coal contractors, cause by a nearby coal gasification plant's construction. Acme Electric continued to expand by opening new locations in Fargo, North Dakota, in 1982; Minot, North Dakota, in 1985; and Duluth, Minnesota, in 1995.

In 1976, Daniel Kuhlman launched the company's first print catalog. Nine years later, the company's mail order division opened in 1985, operating under the name "Tool Crib of the North". The mail order division sold woodworking equipment from print ads in national trade magazines. The company's customer support call center then opened in 1988.

Daniel Kuhlman's sons, the family-owned company's third generation of owners, joined the company after graduating from the University of North Dakota, Steve in 1989 and Paul in 1994. Both Kuhlman brothers began in the company's catalog division. This mail order division mailed annually six million catalogs nationwide and grew the business to more than seven times its size by offering tools to a national audience, realizing 25% annual growth.

In 1998, the Tool Crib of the North constructed a 50,000-square-foot warehouse and distribution center, employing over 100 staff to process 2,000 orders daily across a range of 4,000 items. This company, the same year, also opened Acme Rents in Grand Forks, North Dakota. The Tool Crib of the North then launched a website for tool and equipment sales in 1999, which soon made up five percent of its sales. By the end of 1999, the Tool Crib of the North sold its online and catalog divisions to Amazon.com. Steve Kuhlman left the company to serve as Amazon's North Dakota division director for three years, while Paul Kuhlman stayed with Acme Electric Motor, Inc. as the Vice President of Marketing for all retail locations.

Adhering to a ten-year non-compete agreement with Amazon, the company focused on retail expansion, acquiring Dakota Fastening in 2003 and Puckett Tools in 2004, leading to new stores in Cedar Rapids and Des Moines, Iowa. A new store was also opened in Bemidji, Minnesota, in late 2004.

=== 2005-2022 ===
In 2005, Acme Electric Tool Crib of the North rebranded again, adopting the name "Acme Tools". This company expanded, the same year (2005), into the Twin Cities market with a new brick-and-mortar store in Plymouth, Minnesota. In 2008, this company opened its ninth retail store in Bemidji, Minnesota. In 2010, Acme Tools relaunched its online retail operations with a new eCommerce website, initially offering 5,000 products.

In 2013, Acme Tools launched a new company division called, "Acme Equipment". Acme Equipment took over a 40,000-square-foot building on a 7-acre lot, previously home to a Dodge and Chrysler vehicle dealership. The same year (2013), Acme Tools opened its Williston, North Dakota store location. In 2014, a 40,000-square-foot eCommerce distribution center was built in the Grand Forks Business Park, which was later expanded in 2020. In 2015, this company added a 15,000-square-feet expansion to its headquarters, accommodating new offices and facilities.

=== 2023-2025 ===
In 2023, Acme Tools was the largest B2B e-retailer in North Dakota and was nationally ranked by Internet Retailer. In January 2023, this company's eCommerce division was recognized on Newsweek's "Best Online Shops 2023" list; an award presented by Newsweek and Statista Incorporated.

In 2024, this company's eCommerce division was recognized again Newsweek's "Best Online Shops 2024" list. Acme Tools earned an 8.32 out of 10 rating in the "Garden & Craft" industry and "DIY, Tools, Supplies" category. This score was attributed by Newsweek in collaboration with Statista Incorporated, was based on an evaluation that considered 46 criteria, including trust and security, purchase and delivery processes, site structure and usability, customer service and communication, technical performance, payment options, and traffic growth. The same year (2024), Acme Tools purchased a former Toys 'R' Us building for $4.8 million in Rochester, Minnesota.

In 2025, Acme Tools was ranked on Newsweek's "Best Online Shops 2025" list for the second consecutive year. The company was ranked in the "Garden & Craft" industry and the "DIY, Tools, Supplies" category, earning a rating of 8.31 out of 10. The same year (2025), Acme Tools opened its eleventh retail store location in Eagan, Minnesota. The company's twelve retail store location opened in Rochester, Minnesota in August 2025.

== Mascot ==
The mascot of Acme Tools is called, "Duster". This company debuted its mascot in 1997 at the 4th Annual Woodworking and Power Tool Show, held in Duluth, Minnesota.

== Operations ==
=== Store locations ===
Acme Tools is headquartered in Grand Forks, North Dakota. Acme Tools operates 11 brick-and-mortar retail stores, 2 Acme Equipment facility locations, and various Acme Rents departments throughout North Dakota, Minnesota, and Iowa.

=== Distribution centers ===
In 1998, the company built a 50,000-square-foot warehouse distribution center. In 2014, a 40,000-square-foot eCommerce distribution center was built in the Grand Forks Business Park. In 2023, Acme Tools constructed a 115,888-square-foot distribution center in Burnsville, Minnesota.
