= Acme motorcycle (1915–1917) =

Between 1915 and 1917, EMY Ready assembled at his saddlery and cycle business in Wilmot Street, Burnie, Tasmania, under the "Acme" brand name. At least one of these bikes was powered by a Dalm two-stroke engine.

== See also ==
- List of motorcycle manufacturers
