= Acme Truck Line =

American transportation company

Acme Truck Line, Inc. is a national transportation service based in Gretna, Louisiana on the west bank of New Orleans. The company was founded in 1960. According to the 2008 New Orleans Comprehensive Annual Financial Report, the business was number 3 among top employers in the city.

== Overview ==
The ACME company has a fleet of over 2,900 trucks spanning seven states. ACME's general merchandise includes about 9,000 loads of oilfield and common commodities per week.
