= Catullus 45 =

Poem by Catullus

Catullus 45 is a poem by the Roman poet Catullus. It is an over-the-top love poem that is ever so slightly tongue-in-cheek.

The meter of this poem is hendecasyllabic, a common form in Catullus' poetry.

== Latin text and translation ==
Literal English Translation

Septimius, holding his lover Acme,
in his bosom, said, “my Acme,
if I do not love you desperately and I am not further
prepared to love you continually through all years,
as much as he who is able to die the most,
alone in Libya and scorched in India
may I come to meet the blue eyed lion.”
As he said this, Love sneezed approval on
the left as before on the right.
But Acme, bending back her head lightly,
and having kissed the drunken eyes
of the sweet boy with a purple mouth,
“so,” she said, “my life, little Septimius,
let us serve for this one master continually,
that a flame much greater and sharper
burn for me in the gentle marrow.”
As she said this, Love sneezed approval on
the left as before on the right.
Now, having set out from the good omen
they love and are loved by their mutual minds.
Poor little Septimius prefers Acme alone
to Syria and Britain:
the faithful Acme finds pleasure
and desire in Septimius alone.
Who has seen any humans more blessed,
who (has seen) luckier Venus?

Original Latin

Acmen Septimius suos amores
tenens in gremio ‘me’' inquit ‘Acme,
ni te perdite amo atque amare porro
omnes sum assidue paratus annos,
quantum qui pote plurimum perire,
solus in Libya Indiaque tosta
caesio veniam obvius leoni.’
Hoc ut dixit, Amor sinistra ut ante
dextra sternuit approbationem.
At Acme leviter caput reflectens
et dulcis pueri ebrios ocellos
illo purpureo ore suaviata,
‘sic’ inquit ‘mea vita Septimille,
huic uni domino usque serviamus,
ut multo mihi maior acriorque
ignis mollibus ardet in medullis.’
Hoc ut dixit, Amor sinistra ut ante
dextra sternuit approbationem.
Nunc ab auspicio bono profecti
mutuis animis amant amantur.
Unam Septimius misellus Acmen
mavult quam Syrias Britanniasque:
uno in Septimio fidelis Acme
facit delicias libidinisque.
Wquis ullos homines beatiores
vidit, quis Venerem auspicatiorem?

Line

44.1
45.2
45.3
45.4
45.5
45.6
45.7
45.8
45.9
45.10
45.11
45.12
45.13
45.14
45.15
45.16
45.17
45.18
45.19
45.20
45.21
45.22
45.23
45.24
45.25
45.26

== Bibliography ==
- Newton, R (1996). "Acme and Septimius Recounted: Catullus 45". Syllecta Classica. 7: 99–105. doi:10.1353/syl.1996.0017.
- Gratwick, AS (1992). "Those Sneezes: Catullus 45.8-9, 17-18". Classical Philology. 87 (3): 234–240. doi:10.1086/367311.
- Kitzinger, R (1991–1992). "Reading Catullus 45". Classical Journal. 87: 209–217.
- Frueh, E (1990–1991). "Sinistra ut ante dextra: Reading catullus 45". Classical World. 84: 16–21.
- Williams, MF (1988). "Amor's Head-Cold (frigus in Catullus 45)". Classical Journal. 83: 128–132.
- Nielsen, R (1977). "Catullus 45 and Horace Odes 3.9: The Glass House". Ramus. 6 (2): 132–138. doi:10.1017/S0048671X00004185.
- Singleton, D (1971). "Form and irony in Catullus 45". Greece and Rome. 18 (2): 181–187. doi:10.1017/S0017383500018076.
- Akbar Khan, H (1968). "Catullus 45: What Sort of irony?". Latomus. 27: 3–12.
- Ross, DO (1965). "Style and Content in Catullus 45". Classical Philology. 60 (4): 256–259. doi:10.1086/365048.
