= Acme (computer virus) =

DOS-platform based computer virus

Malware details
- Type: DOS (Windows 95 MS-DOS)
- Subtype: EXE infector. Replicant.
- Classification: Virus
- Family: Clonewar
- Isolation date: 1992
- Origin: United States

Acme is a computer virus which infects MS-DOS EXE files. Each time an infected file is executed, Acme may infect an EXE in the current directory by creating a hidden 247 byte long read-only COM file with the same base name. (In MS-DOS, if the file extension is not specified, and two files with the same base name exist, one with .COM and one with .EXE, the .COM file will always be executed instead of the .EXE file.) Acme is a variant of Clonewar, a spawning virus. Acme is also perhaps a descendant of the small single-step infector Zeno, which is not to be confused with the Zeno programming language.
