= Acme motorcycle (1911–1913) =

Between 1911 and 1913, the Acme Motor & Engineering Company of Lonsdale Street, Melbourne, Victoria, built motorcycles under the "Acme" brand name, using Fafnir and Moser engines in Chater-Lea frames.
