= Petoskey High School =

High school in Petoskey, Michigan

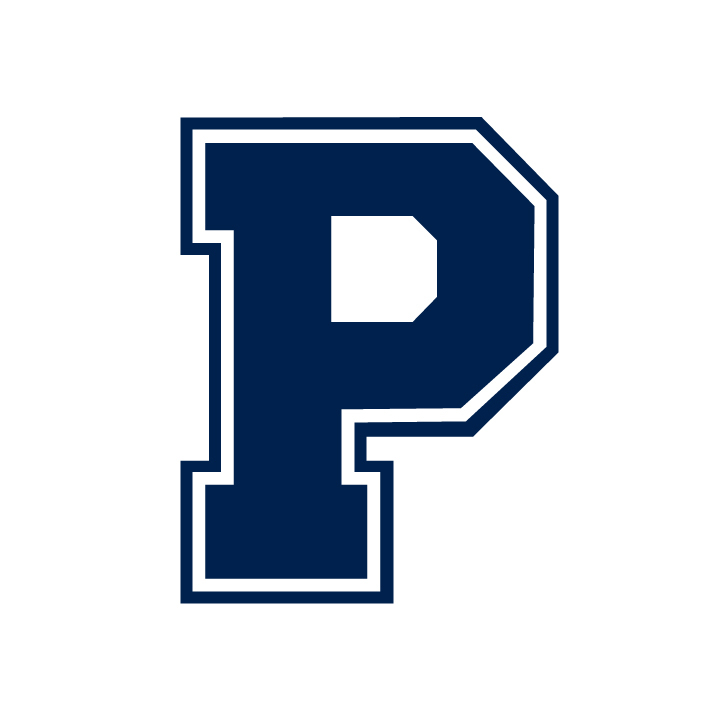

Location
- 1500 Hill Street; Petoskey, Michigan 49770; United States; 45°22′17″N 84°56′12″W

Information
- School type: Public, magnet high school
- School district: Public Schools of Petoskey
- Superintendent: Jeffrey Leslie
- Principal: Deidra Gamble
- Teaching staff: 49.91 (FTE)
- Grades: 9–12
- Gender: Coeducational
- Enrollment: 861 (2023–2024)
- Student to teacher ratio: 17.25
- Colors: Navy; White
- Athletics: MHSAA Class A
- Athletics conference: Big North
- Nickname: Northmen
- Rival: Gaylord High School
- Yearbook: Petosegan
- Website: petoskeyschools.org

Student assessments
- 2021–22 school year Change vs. prior year

M-STEP 11th grade proficiency rates (Science / Social Studies)
- Advanced %: 25.6 / 10.6
- Proficient %: 30.2 / 36.2
- PR. Proficient %: 13.1 / 41.7
- Not Proficient %: 31.2 / 11.6

Average test scores
- SAT Total: 1032.2 (▼ −25.9)

Petoskey High School is a public, magnet high school located in Petoskey, Michigan. Petoskey High School, a part of the Public Schools of Petoskey school district, offers a complementary mix of academic, athletic and leadership opportunities for enrolled students such as track, cross country, band, theater, and ski teams. The alternative public high school in Petoskey is Concord Academy, a K–12 public charter school focused on integration between the arts and academics a very small school though.

== History ==
The original building of Petoskey High School was completed in 1914 at the southeast corner of State and Howard Streets in downtown Petoskey. In 1930, the building today known as Central Elementary was added to the high school building as a junior high. In 1966, the current Petoskey High School building was constructed due to extreme overcrowding at the former building, which had since become the junior high school building. In 1991, the junior high (now middle school) moved out of the older building and into a new one near the current high school. In 1999, the old high school building was demolished, leaving Central Elementary in the current location. The school has recently been reconstructed in 2025-2026. Their parking lot was also redone.

== Attendance boundary ==
In Emmet County the district (and therefore the high school's attendance boundary) includes, in addition to Petoskey: Bay View, Conway, and a portion of Oden. Townships include Bear Creek Township, Resort Township, Springvale Township, and sections of Little Traverse Township and Littlefield Township. A portion of the district is in Charlevoix County, where it includes Walloon Lake. Townships covered include portions of Chandler Township, Hayes Township, and Melrose Township.

== Demographics ==
The demographic breakdown of the 997 students enrolled in 2018–19 was:

  - Male – 52.0%
  - Female – 48.0%
  - Native American – 2.6%
  - Asian – 1.3%
  - Black – 0.5%
  - Hispanic – 2.6%
  - Native Hawaiian/Pacific Islander – 0.1%
  - White – 86.3%
  - Multiracial – 6.7%

In addition, 18.00% of students were eligible for reduced-price or free lunch.

== MHSAA championships ==
- Boys Soccer – 1995, 2008
- Wrestling – 1996
- Boys Tennis – 2002 (co-champions)
- Boys Skiing – 1982, 1984, 1987, 1998, 2000, 2001, 2002, 2004, 2005, 2007, 2008, 2011, 2012, 2013, 2014, 2015, 2016, 2017, 2018, 2020, 2021, 2022
- Girls Skiing – 1980, 1981, 1982, 1984, 1991, 1992, 1993, 1994, 1996, 1997, 2008, 2011, 2013
- Girls Cross Country - 2020
- Girls Track & Field - 2021

== Notable people ==
- Steve Sebo – Former coach, 1937–1939.
- Mark Smolinski – Football coach
- Trevor Huffman, class of 1998. All-time leading scorer for Kent State University Men’s Basketball, professional basketball player
- Albert Paul Linnell (1922–2017) – Astronomer
