= Bear River (Michigan) =

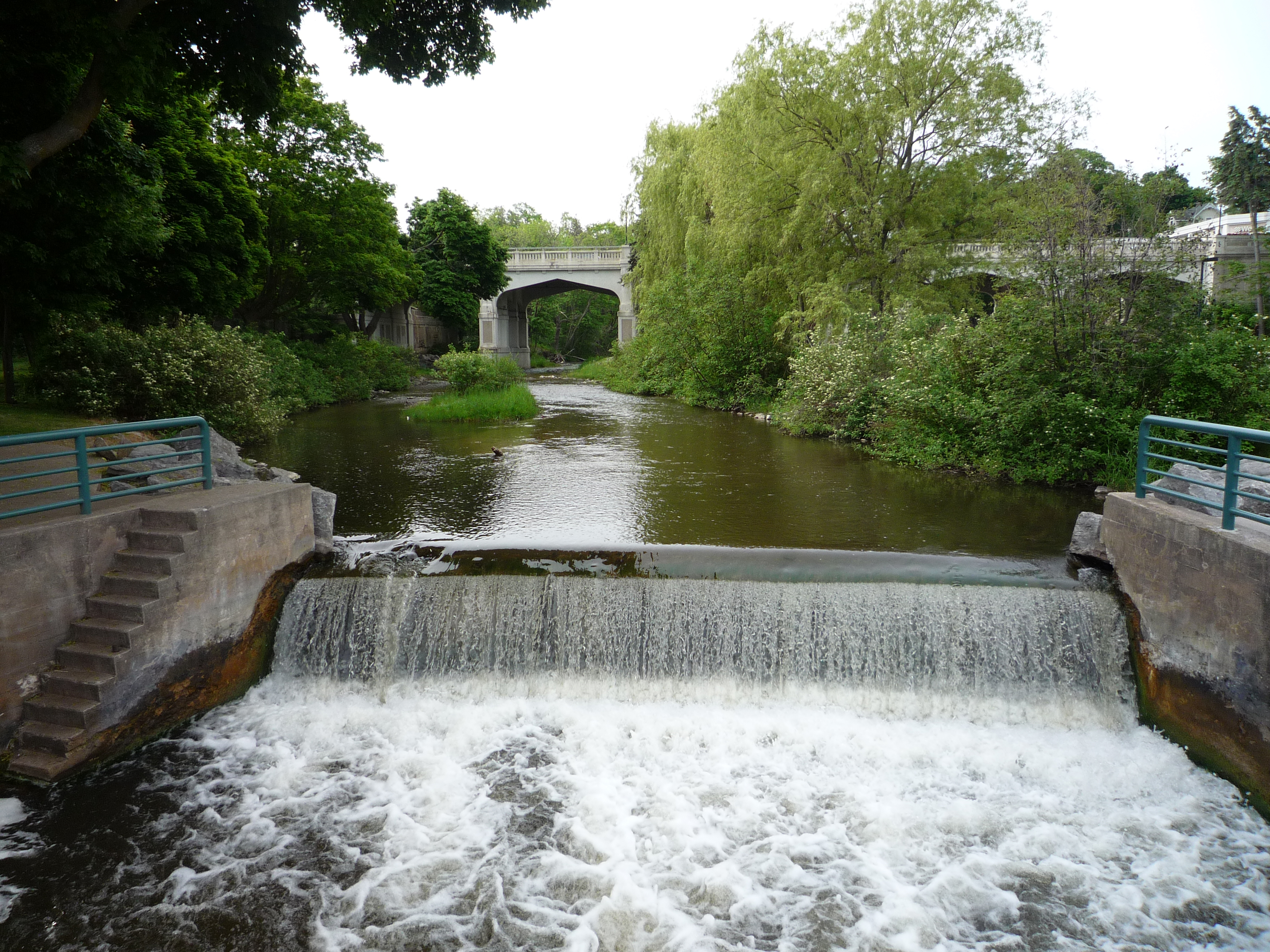
- The Bear River flowing through downtown Petoskey

Location
- Country: Michigan, United States

Physical characteristics
- Source
  - location: Walloon Lake
- Mouth
  - location: Little Traverse Bay
- Length: 14.7 mi (23.7 km)

Basin features
- Tributaries
  - left: Hay Marsh Creek
  - right: Spring Brook

Bear River is a small clear slow-moving river in the U.S. state of Michigan. 14.7 miles (23.7 km) long, it is the largest tributary of Little Traverse Bay in the northwest of the lower peninsula. Traverse Bay is on Lake Michigan. The river is formed as the outflow of Walloon Lake on the boundary between Charlevoix County and Emmet County, draining from the southeast end of the lake at near the community of Walloon Lake in Melrose Township. M-75 has its northern terminus in a junction with US 131 nearby.

The river flows east for about 2 miles (3 km) before turning north through Bear Creek Township, angling northwest to empty into Little Traverse Bay in Petoskey at . Petoskey was at first known as "Bear River" until being renamed in 1873. The Bear River itself has also been known as "Bear Creek" and "Ellis Creek".

The river has excellent fishing and provides opportunities for peaceful canoeing or kayaking. The river is great for smelt fishing. For most of its path in Emmet County, River Road and the Tuscola and Saginaw Bay Railway parallel the river on its west banks.

== Tributaries ==
- (left) Spring Brook
  - (right) South Branch Spring Brook
    - (right) Gimlet Creek
  - (left) North Branch Spring Brook
- (right) Hay Marsh Creek
- Walloon Lake
  - Schoofs Creek

== Drainage basin ==
Including Walloon Lake, the Bear River system drains all or portions of the following cities and townships:

- Charlevoix County
  - Bay Township
  - Boyne Valley Township
  - Chandler Township
  - Evangeline Township
  - Hudson Township
  - Melrose Township
- Emmet County
  - Bear Creek Township
  - Petoskey
  - Resort Township
  - Springvale Township
