= David C. Farris =

American football player and coach (born 1947)

Biographical details
- Born: December 11, 1947; San Jose, California, U.S.

Playing career
- 1966–1969: Central Michigan
- 1970: Hartford Knights
- Positions: Linebacker, tight end

Coaching career (HC unless noted)
- 1980: Wayne State (MI) (OC)
- 1981–1986: Wayne State (MI)
- 1987: Petoskey HS (MI)

Head coaching record
- Overall: 24–35–1 (college)

David Curry Farris (born December 11, 1947) is an American former football player and coach. He served as the head football coach at Wayne State University in Detroit, Michigan from 1981 to 1986, compiling a record of 24–35–1. Farris was also a high school football coach in Michigan and was elected to that state's coaches Hall of Fame.

== Head coaching record ==
=== College ===
Year	Team	Overall	Conference	Standing	Bowl/playoffs
Wayne State Tartars (Great Lakes Intercollegiate Athletic Conference) (1981–1986)
1981	Wayne State	4–5	3–3	T–3rd	
1982	Wayne State	3–7	2–4	T–4th	
1983	Wayne State	7–3	4–2	T–2nd	
1984	Wayne State	6–5	4–2	3rd	
1985	Wayne State	1–8–1	1–5	6th	
1986	Wayne State	3–7	0–5	6th	
Wayne State:		24–35–1	16–21		
Total:		24–35–1			
