= Public Schools of Petoskey =

School district in Michigan, United States

Address
- 1130 Howard Street Petoskey, Eaton, Michigan, 49770; United States

District information
- Grades: Pre-Kindergarten-12
- Superintendent: Dr. Jeffrey Leslie
- Schools: 7
- Budget: $37,443,000 2021-2022 expenditures
- NCES District ID: 2627930

Students and staff
- Students: 2,409 (2024-2025)
- Teachers: 164.51 (on an FTE basis) (2024-2025)
- Staff: 351.66 FTE (2024-2025)
- Student–teacher ratio: 14.64 (2024-2025)

Other information
- Website: www.petoskeyschools.org

Public Schools of Petoskey is a public school district in Northern Michigan. In Emmet County, it serves Petoskey, the townships of Bear Creek, Resort, and Springvale, and parts of the townships of Littlefield and Little Traverse. In Charlevoix County, it serves parts of Chandler Township and Melrose Township.

== History ==
A school has been located on the southeast corner of Howard and State Streets, site of the current Central Elementary, since December 1875, when a new school opened there. The next year, the school almost burned when the thick woods surrounding it caught fire. The school was saved by students and townspeople who doused the flames using a bucket brigade. The students were formally separated into grades in 1881. A high school was built that year at Ottawa and Lake Streets, and the first class graduated in 1885.

The high school burned down in December 1889. It was rebuilt near the Howard Street School and opened in early 1891.

A new high school replaced the Howard Street school in 1913. The previous high school became a grade school called Central. It was torn down around 1929 and a new Central Elementary opened on the site in fall 1930. Warren S. Holmes was the architect. The project included a new 2,000 seat gymnasium for the high school. Also in 1930, the Northmen was chosen as the high school's team name.

A bond issue to build a new high school and Ottawa Elementary passed in 1964. The present high school, designed by architecture firm Daverman Associates, opened in fall 1966. The previous high school became a middle school. A new middle school opened in fall 1990. The 1913 high school building was left empty and was torn down in 1999. A 1945 mural that had been painted in the building was painstakingly salvaged, stored, and reinstalled at North Central Michigan College in 2002.

The 1930 Central Elementary remains in use, including the gym and auditorium once used by the high school.

In 2022, district employees partook in a survey that showed 90 percent of the employees perceived serious problems to be present in the culture of the school district. Superintendent Chris Parker resigned in response. The school board made a plan in response to the survey results and Parker's departure, and Jeffrey Leslie became the new superintendent.

== Schools ==
Schools in Public Schools of Petoskey District
School	Address	Notes
Petoskey High School	1500 Hill Street, Petoskey	Grades 9-12. Opened 1966.
Petoskey Middle School	801 Northmen Drive, Petoskey	Grades 6-8. Opened 1990.
Central Elementary	410 State Street, Petoskey	Grades K-5. Opened 1930.
Lincoln Elementary	616 Connable Avenue, Petoskey	Grades K-5
Ottawa Elementary School	871 Kalamazoo Avenue, Petoskey	Grades PreK-5
Sheridan Elementary School	1415 Howard Street, Petoskey	Grades K-5
