= Troutdale =

Troutdale may refer to:

- Troutdale, Michigan
- Troutdale, Oregon
  - Portland–Troutdale Airport
- Troutdale, Virginia
