= Big Rock Point Nuclear Power Plant =

Former nuclear power plant in Charlevoix County, Michigan

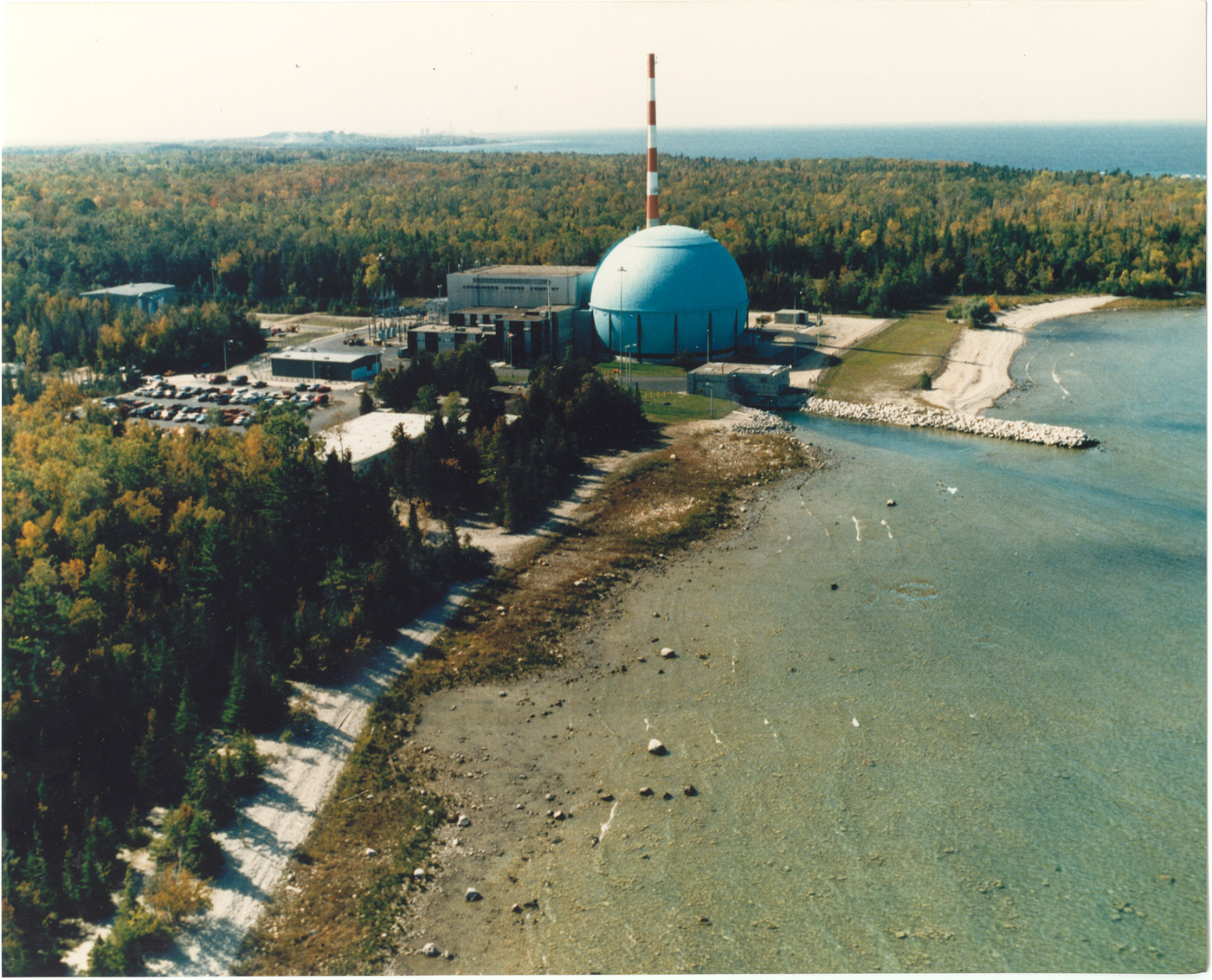
- Country: United States
- Location: Hayes Township
- Coordinates: 45°21′32″N 85°11′50″W
- Status: Decommissioned
- Construction began: 1 May 1960
- Commission date: 29 March 1963
- Decommission date: 29 August 1997
- Operator: Consumers Energy
- Thermal capacity: 240 MWth

Power generation
- Units decommissioned: 1 × 71 MW
- Nameplate capacity: 72 MW

External links
- Commons: Related media on Commons

Big Rock Point Nuclear Power Plant
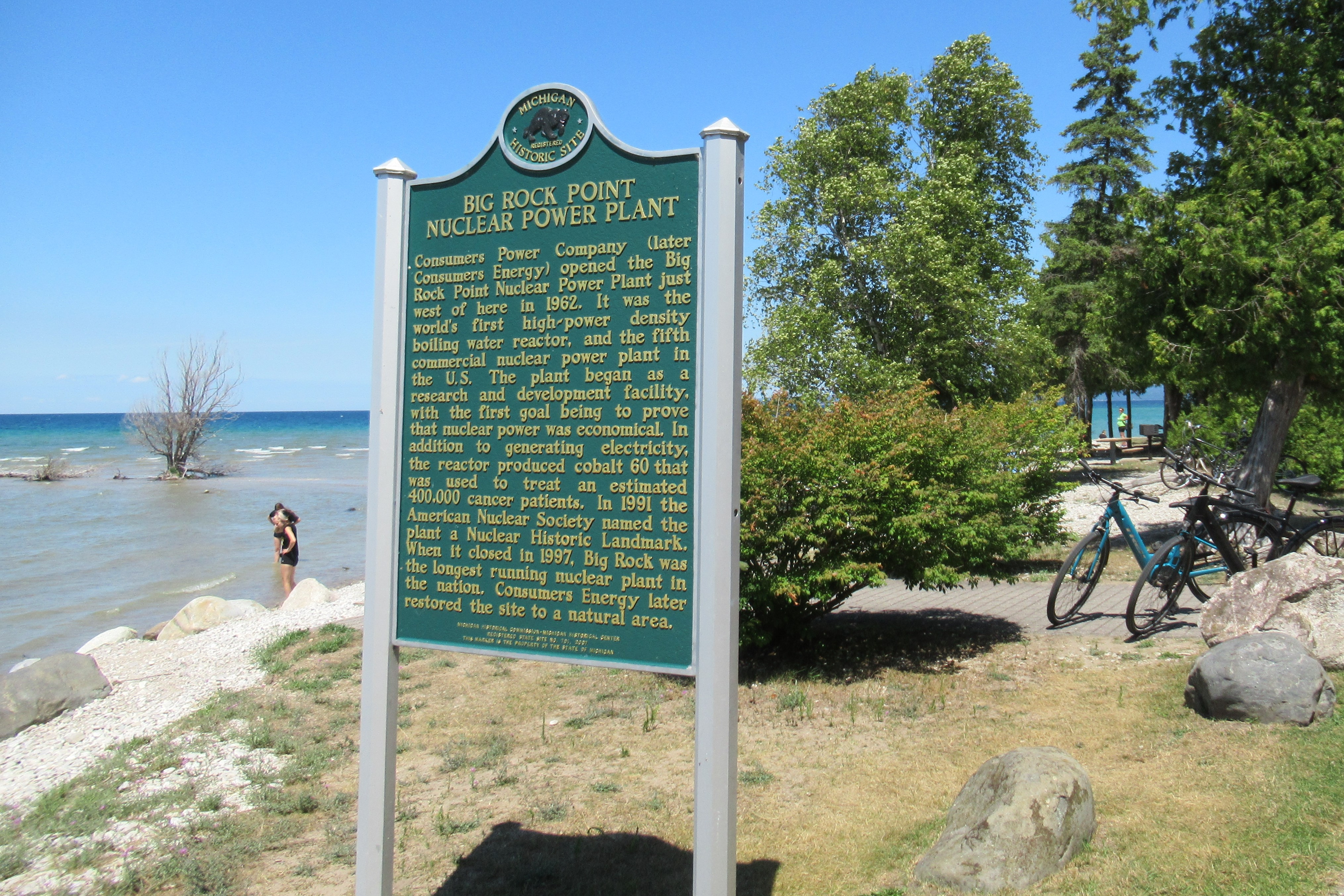
- Michigan state historic marker
- Interactive map of Big Rock Point; Nuclear Power Plant
- 45°21′46″N 85°10′32″W
- Location: Lake Michigan Shores Roadside Park, U.S. Route 31; Hayes Township, Michigan

History
- Built: 1960–1962
- Demolished: 2003

Michigan State Historic Site
- Designated: 2007

Big Rock Point was a nuclear power plant near Charlevoix, Michigan, United States. Big Rock operated from 1962 to 1997. It was owned and operated by Consumers Power, now known as Consumers Energy. Its boiling water reactor was made by General Electric (GE) and was capable of producing 67 megawatts of electricity. Bechtel Corporation was the primary contractor.

== History ==
Big Rock was Michigan's first nuclear power plant and the nation's fifth. It also produced cobalt-60 for the medical industry from 1971 to 1982.

Ground was broken on July 20, 1960. Construction was completed in 29 months at a cost of $27.7 million. Its operating license was issued by the Atomic Energy Commission on August 29, 1962. The reactor first went critical on September 27 and the first electricity was generated on December 8, 1962.

A promotional video for the plant featuring then GE spokesman Ronald Reagan was produced in 1962.

In 1991, the American Nuclear Society named Big Rock Point a Nuclear Historic Landmark.

== Design ==
The reactor vessel had a dimension of 30 feet (9.1 m) in height, and 9 feet (2.7 m) in diameter. The thickness of reactor vessel walls was 5½ inches.

The stack that once stood behind the main generator of the plant was used as a navigational landmark to let boaters have a visual landmark to Charlevoix, Michigan.

== Closure and decommissioning ==
Consumers Energy had previously announced that Big Rock Point's operating license would not be renewed when it expired on May 31, 2000. However, economics proved in January 1997 that it was not feasible to keep Big Rock Point running to the license's expiration date.

The reactor was scrammed for the last time at 10:33 a.m. EDT on August 29, 1997, 35 years to the day after its license had been issued. The last fuel was removed from the core on September 20. Decontamination was completed in 1999.

During the decommissioning process it was discovered that a backup safety system at the plant had been inoperable for at least the previous 14 years. The Liquid Poison System (LPS) consisted of a tank filled with a liquid solution containing boron, a neutron absorber. In the event of a control rod failure during a reactor scram, the LPS system would have drained the boron solution into the core thus halting the nuclear chain reaction. However, during decommissioning when technicians attempted to drain the tank they were unable to do so due to a corroded pipe.

The 235,000-pound (107,000 kg) reactor vessel was removed on August 25, 2003, and shipped to Barnwell, South Carolina on October 7, 2003.

By 2006, all of Big Rock Point's 500-acre (200 ha) area has been torn down, other than the spent fuel storage facility with eight spent fuel casks.

In total, the shipment of low-level radioactive waste and non-radioactive building materials had cost approximately $390,000,000.

== Reuse of property ==
In July 2006, the state of Michigan announced it was considering buying the site, which features a mile of Lake Michigan shoreline, for a possible state park.

As part of the sale of Consumers' Palisades Nuclear Plant, the new owner Entergy accepted the responsibility for a basketball court size piece of property at Big Rock containing that plant's eight casks of spent fuel.

== Controversial events ==
Located near Big Rock Point was a military base for the United States Air Force Strategic Air Command Detachment 6 known as Bay Shore Radar Bombing Score (RBS) Group. Low altitude flights were performed by B-52Cs to simulate deadly bombing missions. On January 7, 1971, a B52C (Using radio call sign ‘Hiram 16’) from the bombing group at Westover Air Force Base near Springfield, Massachusetts took off to perform radar bomb scoring in tandem with the Bay Shore RBS group at the Bay Shore RBS Site. At 6:33 PM, after completing three successful electronic bombings, the Bay Shore RBS crew lost contact with the B-52C flight crew. Witnesses observed a fireball falling from the sky with a large associated loud explosion as the B-52C impacted the water at Little Traverse Bay, 5 miles north of the Big Rock Point Nuclear Power Plant. All nine on board were lost. This became known as 1971 B-52C Lake Michigan crash.
