= Hayes Township, Charlevoix County, Michigan =

Hayes Township, Michigan
- Civil township
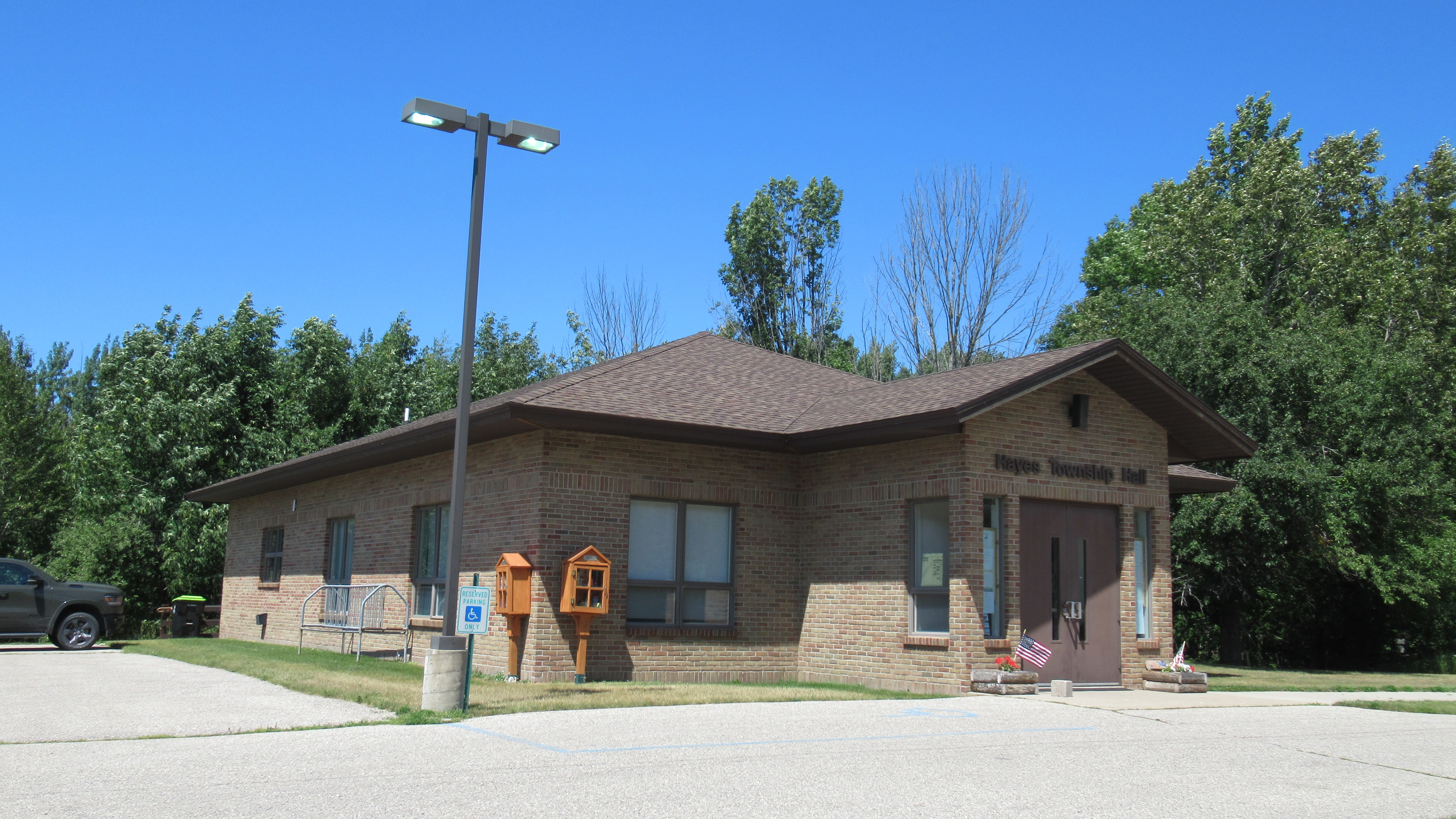
- Hayes Township Hall

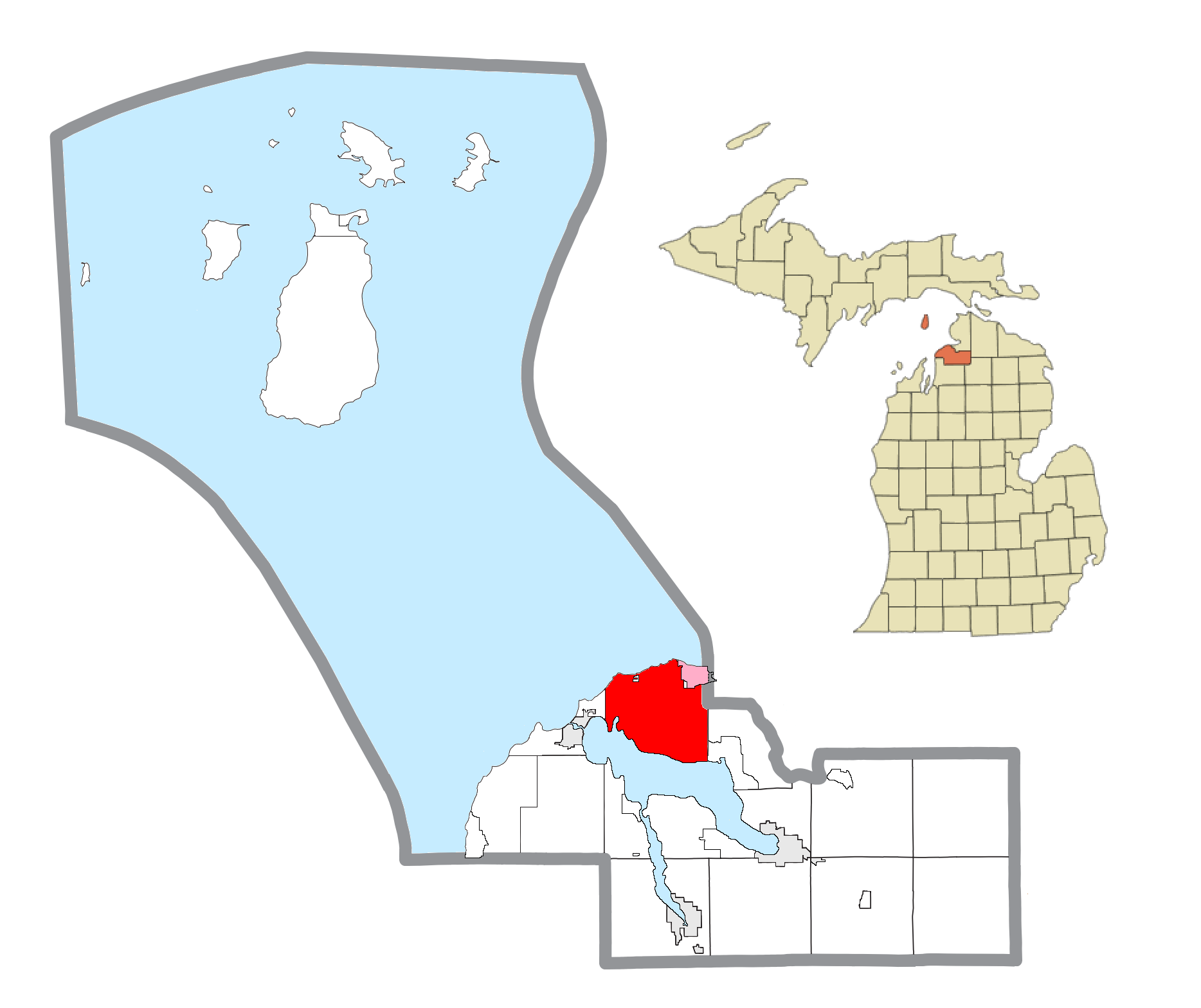
- Location within Charlevoix County (red) and an administered portion of the Bay Shore CDP (pink)

- Location within the state of Michigan Location within the United States
- Coordinates: 45°19′30″N 85°08′52″W
- Country: United States
- State: Michigan
- County: Charlevoix

Government
  - Supervisor: Ron VanZee
  - Clerk: Kristin Baranski

Area
  - Total: 43.17 sq mi (111.81 km^{2})
  - Land: 30.09 sq mi (77.93 km^{2})
  - Water: 13.08 sq mi (33.88 km^{2})
- Elevation: 761 ft (232 m)

Population (2020)
  - Total: 2,000
  - Density: 66/sq mi (26/km^{2})
- Time zone: UTC-5 (Eastern (EST))
  - Summer (DST): UTC-4 (EDT)
- ZIP code(s): 49711 (Bay Shore); 49720 (Charlevoix)
- Area code: 231
- FIPS code: 26-37320
- GNIS feature ID: 1626453
- Website: Official website

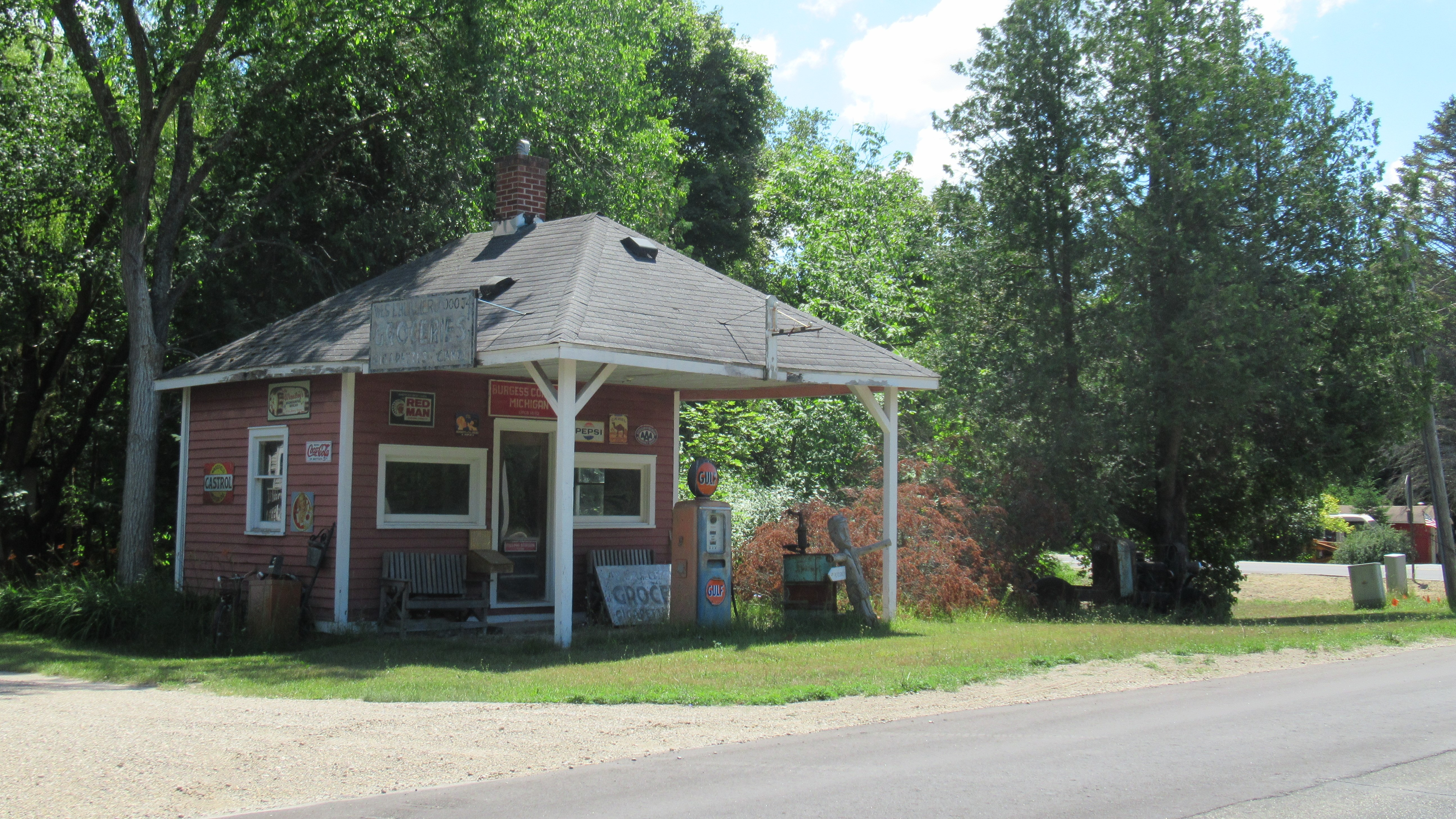
Historic gas station in Burgess Corner

Hayes Township is a civil township of Charlevoix County in the U.S. state of Michigan. The population was 2,000 at the 2020 census.

== Communities ==
- Bay Shore is an unincorporated community and census-designated place located in the northeastern portion of township along the shores of Lake Michigan at 45°21′30″N 85°05′50″W. The community also extends east into Resort Township in Emmet County.
- Burgess (or Burgess Corner) is an unincorporated community located within the township at 45°21′09″N 85°09′41″W. It began as a sawmill settlement in 1877 and was named after mill owner E. H. Burgess. A post office operated in Burgess from February 28, 1877, until July 14, 1904.
- Embo is a former settlement within the township about 4.5 miles (7.2 km) east of Charlevoix. It was given a railroad station along the Grand Rapids and Indiana Railroad, and a post office opened on April 3, 1873. The post office operated only briefly until closing on October 27, 1875.
- Success is a former settlement within the township that existed with a rural post office that opened on June 3, 1913, and operated very briefly.
- Undine is a former settlement that existed along the northern shores of Pine Lake (now Lake Charlevoix). It began as a lumber settlement and received a post office on January 15, 1880, with farmer Charles Whitford serving as the first postmaster. The name may have derived from the Undine, which are mythological humans associated with water. The post office operated until March 16, 1896.

== Geography ==
According to the U.S. Census Bureau, the township has a total area of 43.17 square miles (111.81 km^{2}), of which 30.09 square miles (77.93 km^{2}) is land and 13.08 square miles (33.88 km^{2}) (30.30%) is water.

Hayes Township is located along the shore of Lake Michigan on the south side of the entrance to Little Traverse Bay. The township extends to Lake Charlevoix on its southern border. Big Rock Point Nuclear Power Plant was located within the township.

=== Major highways ===
- US 31 runs along the northern portion of the township near Lake Michigan.
- C-56 (Boyne City Road) is a county-designated highway that runs the length of the southern portion of the township near Lake Charlevoix.

== Demographics ==
As of the census of 2000, there were 1,893 people, 767 households, and 578 families residing in the township. The population density was 62.9 inhabitants per square mile (24.3/km^{2}). There were 1,030 housing units at an average density of 34.2 per square mile (13.2/km^{2}). The racial makeup of the township was 95.88% White, 0.05% African American, 2.06% Native American, 0.53% Asian, 0.05% Pacific Islander, 0.21% from other races, and 1.22% from two or more races. Hispanic or Latino of any race were 0.26% of the population.

There were 767 households, out of which 30.5% had children under the age of 18 living with them, 65.4% were married couples living together, 6.0% had a female householder with no husband present, and 24.6% were non-families. 19.2% of all households were made up of individuals, and 6.8% had someone living alone who was 65 years of age or older. The average household size was 2.47 and the average family size was 2.81.

In the township the population was spread out, with 23.3% under the age of 18, 4.5% from 18 to 24, 27.4% from 25 to 44, 30.9% from 45 to 64, and 13.8% who were 65 years of age or older. The median age was 42 years. For every 100 females, there were 99.7 males. For every 100 females age 18 and over, there were 98.2 males.

The median income for a household in the township was $50,478, and the median income for a family was $54,911. Males had a median income of $35,694 versus $26,324 for females. The per capita income for the township was $25,512. About 5.3% of families and 6.2% of the population were below the poverty line, including 10.8% of those under age 18 and 2.4% of those age 65 or over.

== Education ==
Hayes Township is served by three separate school districts. The vast majority of the township is served by Charlevoix Public Schools to the west in the city of Charlevoix. The southeast corner of the township is served by Boyne City Public Schools to the southeast in the city of Boyne City. The northeast corner of the township, including most of the CDP of Bay Shore, is served by the Public Schools of Petoskey to the northeast in the city of Petoskey.
