= UX Ursae Majoris =

Variable star in the constellation Ursa Major

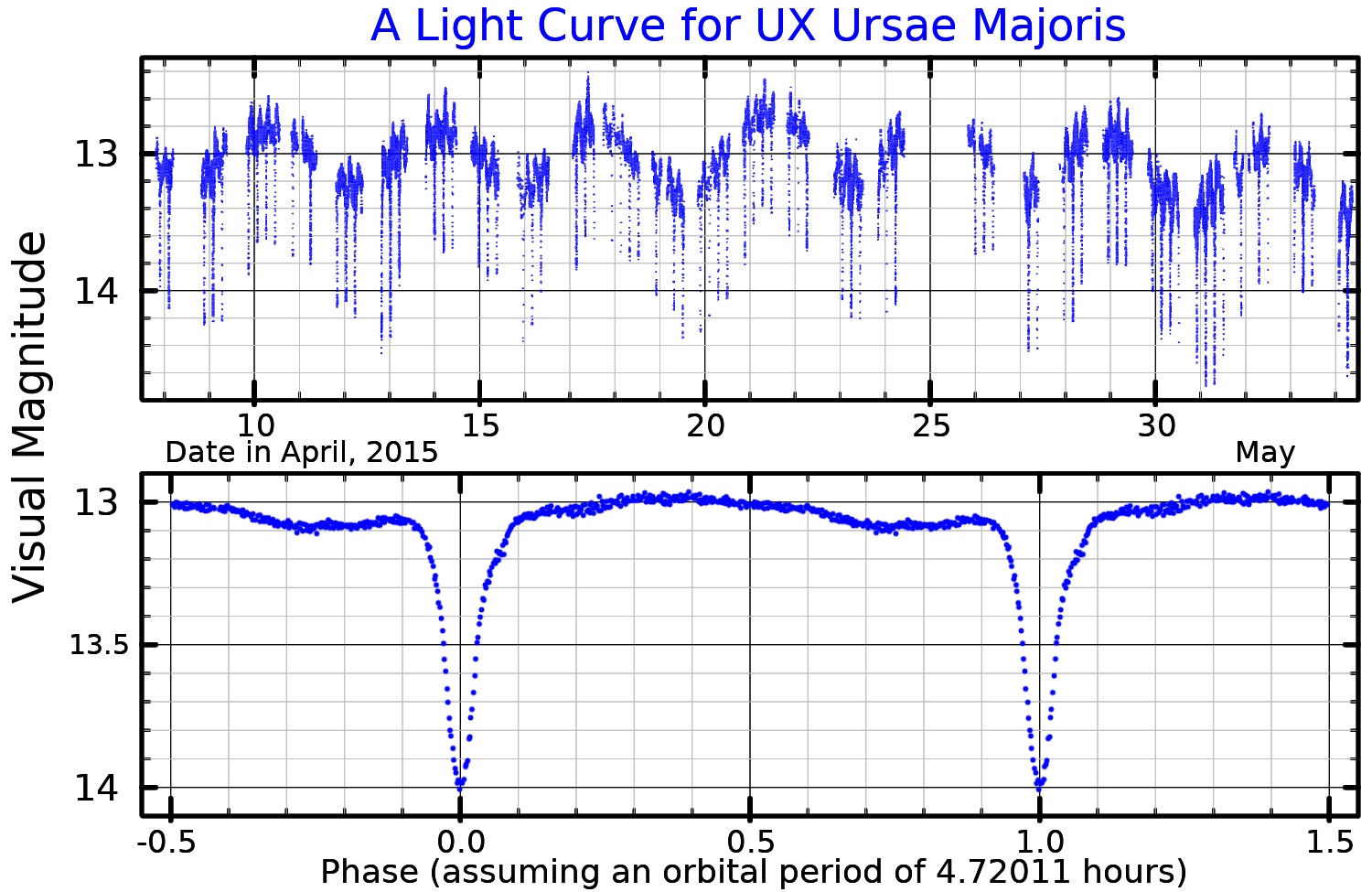
- A visual band light curve for UX Ursae Majoris, adapted from de Miguel et al. (2016). The top plot shows the variation over several weeks, and the bottom plot shows the mean light curve over one orbital period.

Observation data Epoch J2000.0 Equinox J2000.0
- Constellation: Ursa Major
- Right ascension: 13^{h} 36^{m} 40.953^{s}
- Declination: +51° 54′ 49.42″
- Apparent magnitude (V): 12.57 to 14.15

Characteristics
- Spectral type: sdOB + M4+
- Variable type: β Per, nova-like

Astrometry
Radial velocity (R_{v})	112.0 km/s
Proper motion (μ)	RA: −41.614 mas/yr Dec.: 17.180 mas/yr
Parallax (π)	3.4252±0.0157 mas
Distance	952 ± 4 ly (292 ± 1 pc)

Orbit
Period (P)	4.72 hours
Semi-major axis (a)	1.51 – 1.61 R_{☉}
Inclination (i)	65 – 75°
Semi-amplitude (K_{1}) (primary)	113±11 km/s
Semi-amplitude (K_{2}) (secondary)	262±14 km/s

Details

White dwarf
Mass	0.47 M_{☉}
Radius	9,700 km
Surface gravity (log g)	7.7 cgs
Temperature	20,000 K

Donor star
Mass	0.47 M_{☉}
Radius	0.496 – 0.697 R_{☉}
Surface gravity (log g)	−4.65 – 4.73 cgs

Accretion disk
Radius	0.488 R_{☉}
Temperature	88,450±21,230 K

Other designations
- UX UMa, AAVSO 1332+52

Database references
SIMBAD	data

UX Ursae Majoris is an Algol type binary star system in the northern circumpolar constellation of Ursa Major. It is classified as a nova-like variable star similar to DQ Herculis, although no eruptions have been reported. Since its discovery in 1933, this system has been the subject of numerous studies attempting to determine its properties. The combined apparent visual magnitude of UX UMa ranges from 12.57 down to 14.15. The system is located at a distance of approximately 952 light years from the Sun based on parallax, and is drifting further away with a radial velocity of 112 km/s.

This system was found to be an eclipsing binary by the Soviet astronomer S. Belyavsky in 1933. At the time, the period of 4.73 hours was the shortest known for a binary star system. M. Zverev and B. Kukarkin published elements from a light curve made from visual observations in 1937, while in 1939 V. A. Krat at Pulkovo Observatory produced a solution based on his photographic observations. G. P. Kuiper in 1941 classified the star as a B3 subdwarf. O. Struve in 1948 noted that the system underwent significant variations in its spectrum. A. P. Linnell produced the first photoelectric light curve of the system in 1950, finding that the brightness underwent an increase just prior to the primary eclipse. He also noted that the system underwent rapid light variation.

Observations of this system up to 1962 showed the period was changing: it increased up until 1953 then began decreasing. The depth of the eclipse was found to vary with wavelength, decreasing in depth with increasing wavelength possibly due to contributions by a cooler stellar component or surrounding material. M. F. Walker and G. H. Herbig in 1954 suggested that the hump in the light curve is due to a hot spot. In 1974, R. E. Nather and E. L. Robinson proposed that the hot component is a white dwarf surrounded by a optically thick, orbiting disk of gas. The hot spot on the disk is formed by a stream of gas from the donor secondary star, and is the main source of the rapid flickering from the system. The observed light curve can be reproduced by an orbital inclination of ~75° to the line of sight to the earth, with the white dwarf being almost completely obscured by its accretion disk.

UX UMa is considered an archetypal example of nova-like variables that are always in a high accretion state, showing bright steady disks. A photometric study of the system during 2015 found a cyclical signal with a mean period of 3.680 days and an amplitude of 0.44 in magnitude. This is interpreted as retrograde nodal precession of the accretion disk. The infalling matter is creating a compact clump in the accretion disk. This is shielding illumination from the hot inner disk, forming a dark spot. Doppler tomography of the disk shows a spiral structure. Observations during 1999 showed spectral features characteristic of an SW Sextantis variable, but at other times these features disappeared.
