= Bay Shore, Michigan =

- Census-designated place (CDP) & unincorporated community
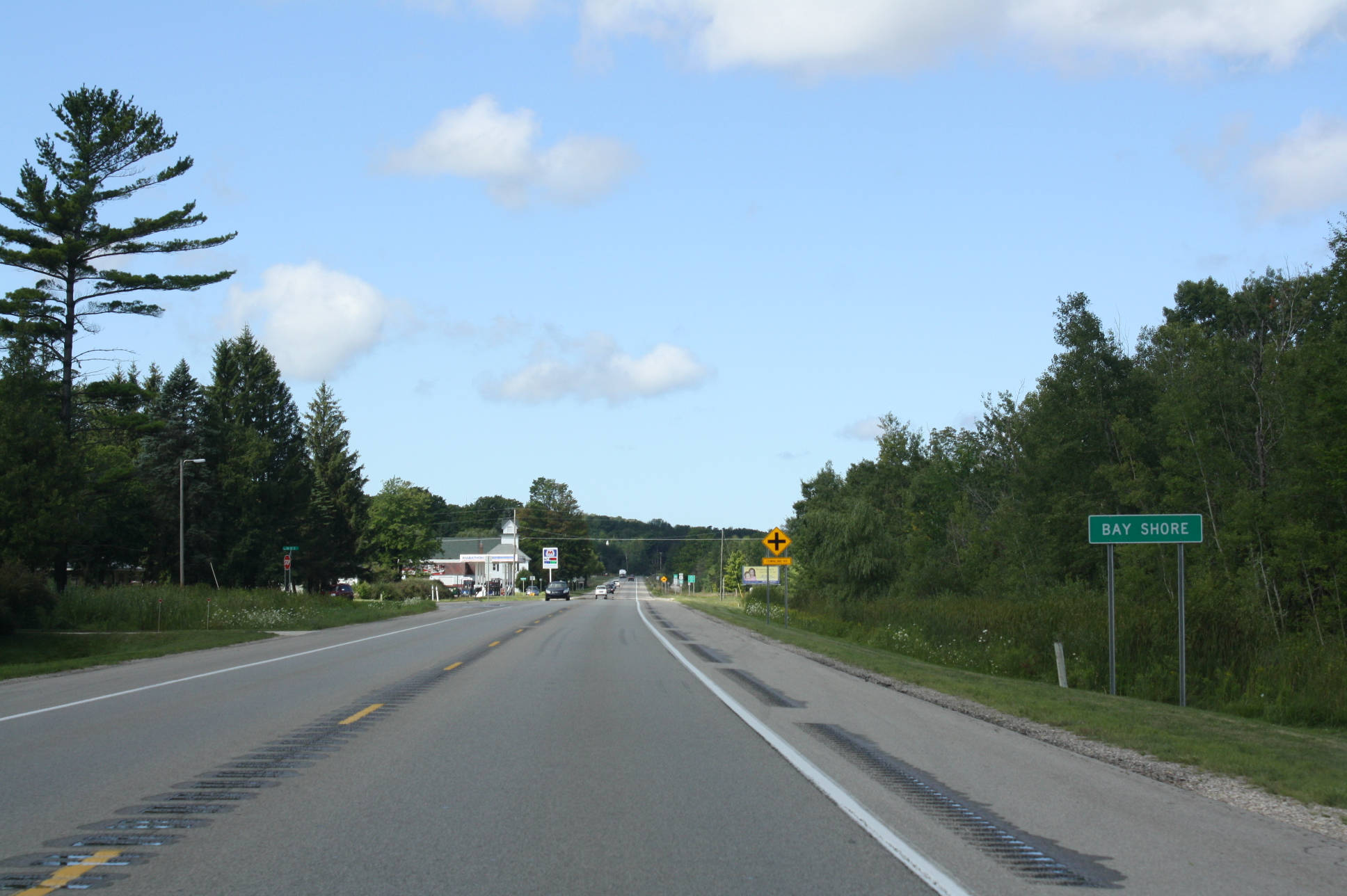
- Signage along U.S. Route 31

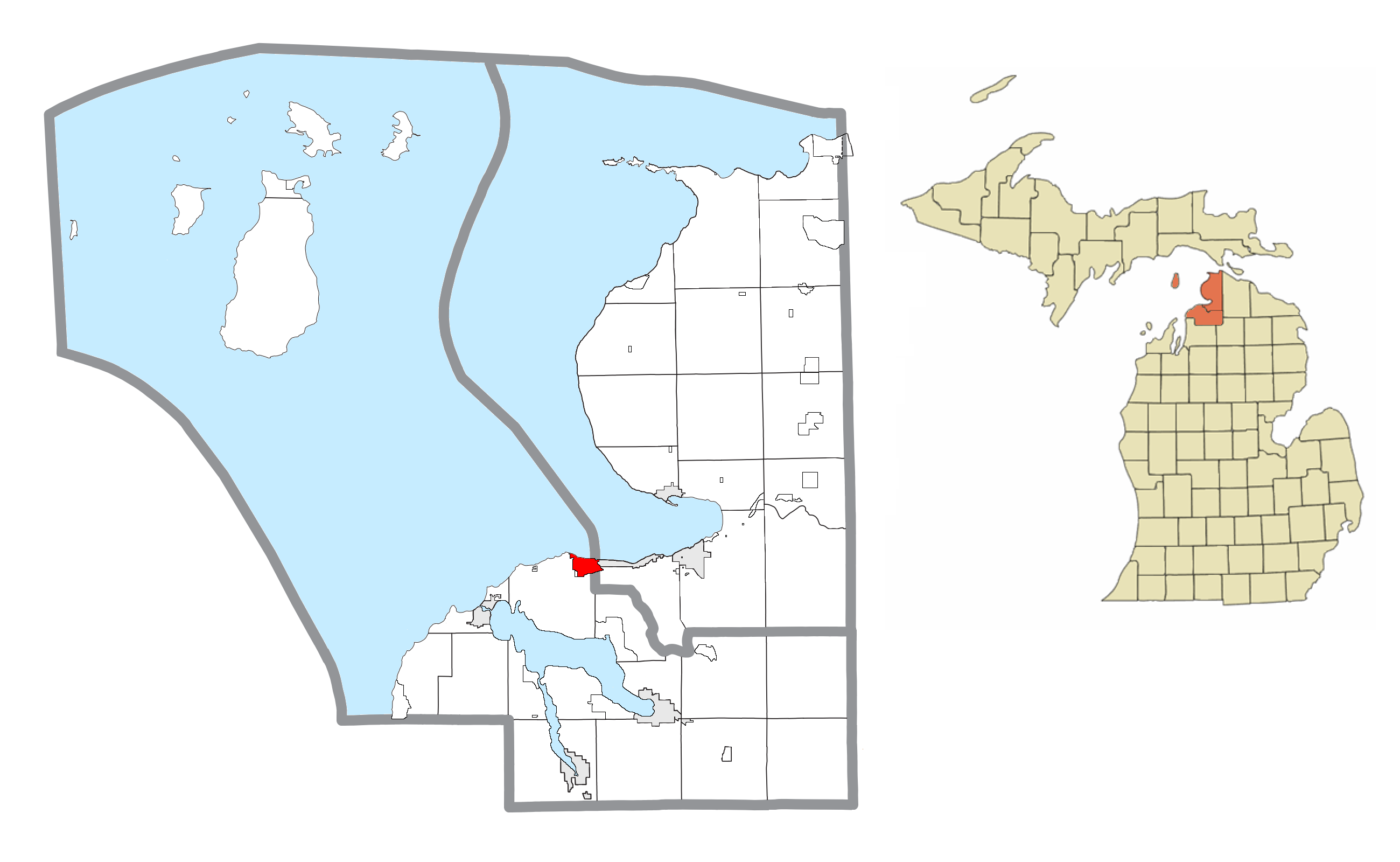
- Location within Charlevoix County (bottom) and Emmet County (top)

- Location within the state of Michigan Location within the United States
- Coordinates: 45°21′30″N 85°05′50″W
- Country: United States
- State: Michigan
- Counties: Charlevoix and Emmet
- Townships: Hayes and Resort
- Established: 1892
- Platted: 1896

Area
  - Total: 1.56 sq mi (4.03 km^{2})
  - Land: 1.55 sq mi (4.02 km^{2})
  - Water: 0 sq mi (0.00 km^{2})
- Elevation: 676 ft (206 m)

Population (2020)
  - Total: 687
  - Density: 442/sq mi (170.7/km^{2})
- Time zone: UTC-5 (Eastern (EST))
  - Summer (DST): UTC-4 (EDT)
- ZIP code(s): 49711; 49720 (Charlevoix); 49770 (Petoskey)
- Area code: 231
- FIPS code: 26-06190
- GNIS feature ID: 1618887

Bay Shore is an unincorporated community and census-designated place (CDP) located on the boundary between Charlevoix County and Emmet County in the U.S. state of Michigan. The population of the CDP was 657 at the 2020 census.

Bay Shore is located along Little Traverse Bay on Lake Michigan just west of the city of Petoskey. It is mostly within Hayes Township in Charlevoix County with a small portion extending east into Resort Township in Emmet County.

== History ==
The land was originally owned by Eugene Sly and Nancy Stauffer. The community was known as both Bay Side to the north and Bay Shore, but the Bay Shore name was adopted when the Chicago and West Michigan Railway built a station there in 1892. The name Bay Shore came from its coastal location on Little Traverse Bay. A post office opened in Bay Shore on July 25, 1892 with Sly serving as the first postmaster. The community was surveyed and platted by John Swift in 1896. The post office operated until September 30, 1965.

While the community no longer has its own post office, it may use the Bay Shore 49711 post office box ZIP Code.

The community of Bay Shore was listed as a newly-organized census-designated place for the 2010 census, meaning it now has officially defined boundaries and population statistics for the first time.

== Geography ==
According to the U.S. Census Bureau, the Bay Shore CDP has a total area of 1.55 square miles (4.01 km^{2}), all land.

=== Major highways ===
- US 31 runs through the center of the community near the coast of Lake Michigan.
- C-71 (Horton Bay Road) is just to the east of the community and runs south to Horton Bay.

== Demographics ==
Historical population
Census	Pop.	Note	%±
2010	754		—
2020	687		−8.9%
U.S. Decennial Census

Bay Shore, Michigan, is a small Census-Designated Place (CDP) with a current population of 607 people as of the 2023.

The community is characterized by an older demographic, with a median age of 51.3 years, which is significantly higher than the median age for the state of Michigan.

The population is predominantly White, with approximately 91% identifying as White (Non-Hispanic).

Socioeconomically, Bay Shore demonstrates higher figures than the state average, featuring a median household income of $72,538. This represents a 12.6% increase from the previous year, when the median income was $64,444.

The community's poverty rate is 9.3%, which is lower than the Michigan state rate of 13.1%. The homeownership rate is quite high at 91.1%, and 92.6% of residents have a high school degree or higher.

The population saw a notable 13.9% increase between 2022 and 2023, growing from 533 to 607 residents. The median property value in the CDP was $116,300 in 2023. Most employed residents commute by driving alone (55%), with a significant portion carpooling (40%), and the average commute time is 16.6 minutes.

== Education ==
Bay Shore is located at the fringes of three separate school districts. The Public Schools of Petoskey to the east in Petoskey serves the eastern portion of the community, including areas in both Charlevoix and Emmet counties. The southernmost portion of the community may be served by Boyne City Public Schools at the northernmost edge of the school district centered far to the south in Boyne City. The western portion of the community may attend Charlevoix Public Schools to the southwest in Charlevoix.
