= Albert Paul Linnell =

- Born: June 30, 1922; Canby, Minnesota
- Died: January 30, 2017 (aged 94); Seattle, Washington
- Education: Ph. D. in Astronomy
- Alma mater: College of Wooster; Harvard University
- Known for: Studies of close binary star systems and cataclysmic variables
- Spouse(s): Jane Elliott (1944–1991); Ann S. Kremer (1993–2017)
- Children: Carol, Paul, Andrew, Barrie, Scott
- Parents: Edward Payson Linnell (father); Pearl Huston (mother)
- Scientific career
- Fields: Astronomy
- Institutions: Amherst College (1949–1966); Michigan State University (1966–1991); University of Washington
- Thesis: Astronomical Photoelectric Photometry (1950)
- Doctoral advisor: Bart J. Bok

Albert Paul Linnell (June 30, 1922 – January 30, 2017) was an American astronomer and professor. He was a Lieutenant in the United States Army Signal Corps during World War II.

== Biography ==
Linnell was born June 30, 1922, in Canby, Minnesota. He was the second child of Edward Payson Linnell and Pearl Huston, following his sister Rachel. Two years after his birth, his family relocated to Boyne City, Michigan, then later to Petoskey where Linnell graduated from High School in 1940. Matriculating to the College of Wooster in Ohio, he graduated Phi Beta Kappa in 1944 with bachelor's degrees in chemistry, math, and physics. Linnell received general honors and the William H. Wilson award in mathematics.

With his undergraduate studies completed, during the summer of 1943 Linnell enlisted in the U.S. Army to serve in World War II. He was married to Jane Elliott in 1944; the couple would have five children. Linnell completed officer candidate school in 1944, and was commissioned a second lieutenant in the Army Signal Corps at Fort Monmouth, New Jersey. In 1945 he was deployed to the Philippines, where he received a promotion to first lieutenant before returning to civilian life.

In 1946, he enrolled in the astronomy graduate program at Harvard University. Under doctoral advisor Bart J. Bok, Linnell received his Ph.D. from Harvard in 1950 with a thesis titled, Astronomical Photoelectric Photometry. The design for a photoelectric photometer described in his thesis was assembled by Linnell and used with the Rockefeller Reflector at Boyden Observatory. He made a study of the eclipsing binary UX Ursae Majoris while at Harvard, producing the first photoelectric light curve of this system. This was the discovery paper of a class of systems now named cataclysmic variables.

Linnell was appointed as an astronomy instructor at Amherst College in 1949, where he became one of the pioneers of high-speed photometry in astronomy. In 1953, he served on the Goldberg panel that proposed a national observatory at Kitt Peak. In October 1953, associate professor Linnell proposed joining the astronomy programs at Amherst, Mount Holyoke, and Smith colleges, and the University of Massachusetts into a merged department. The individual college astronomy programs were small and the university lacked an astronomy program, so by combining resources they could form a more comprehensive program. Despite some resistance, a joint astronomy program was agreed upon in 1959, and was formed on February 1, 1960. In 1960, he served on a panel that selected the site for the Cerro Tololo Inter-American Observatory. He submitted a proposal for masters and doctorate programs to the University of Massachusetts graduate council in 1964. At the end of the 1965–1966 academic year, Linnell resigned from Amherst during a down-sizing of the college astronomy department.

Linnell joined the faculty of Michigan State University in 1966, where he founded the astronomy/astrophysics department and served as its chairman. He studied eclipsing binary stars and worked on computer-based methods for analyzing their light curves. Linnell oversaw the construction of the campus observatory, which was mostly completed by 1969, and dedicated in 1971. This observatory featured a 24-inch Ritchey–Chrétien telescope with an optional coudé focus. An automated system was developed by Linnell and associates to perform photoelectric photometry on this instrument. Beginning around 1984, Linnell developed the FORTRAN-based BINSYS package for simulating binary star systems.

His wife died in 1991, and he retired as professor emeritus the same year. Linnell moved to Seattle, Washington where he was granted visiting scholar status at the University of Washington. He was named a fellow of the AAAS. Two years later, he was married to fellow MSU professor Ann Schnatterly Kremer. Much of his work during this period was focused on cataclysmic variables. His final paper, a collaborative study on two Z Camelopardalis stars, was published in 2013, less than four years from his death at age 94.
