= Walloon Lake, Michigan =

- Census-designated place (CDP) & unincorporated community
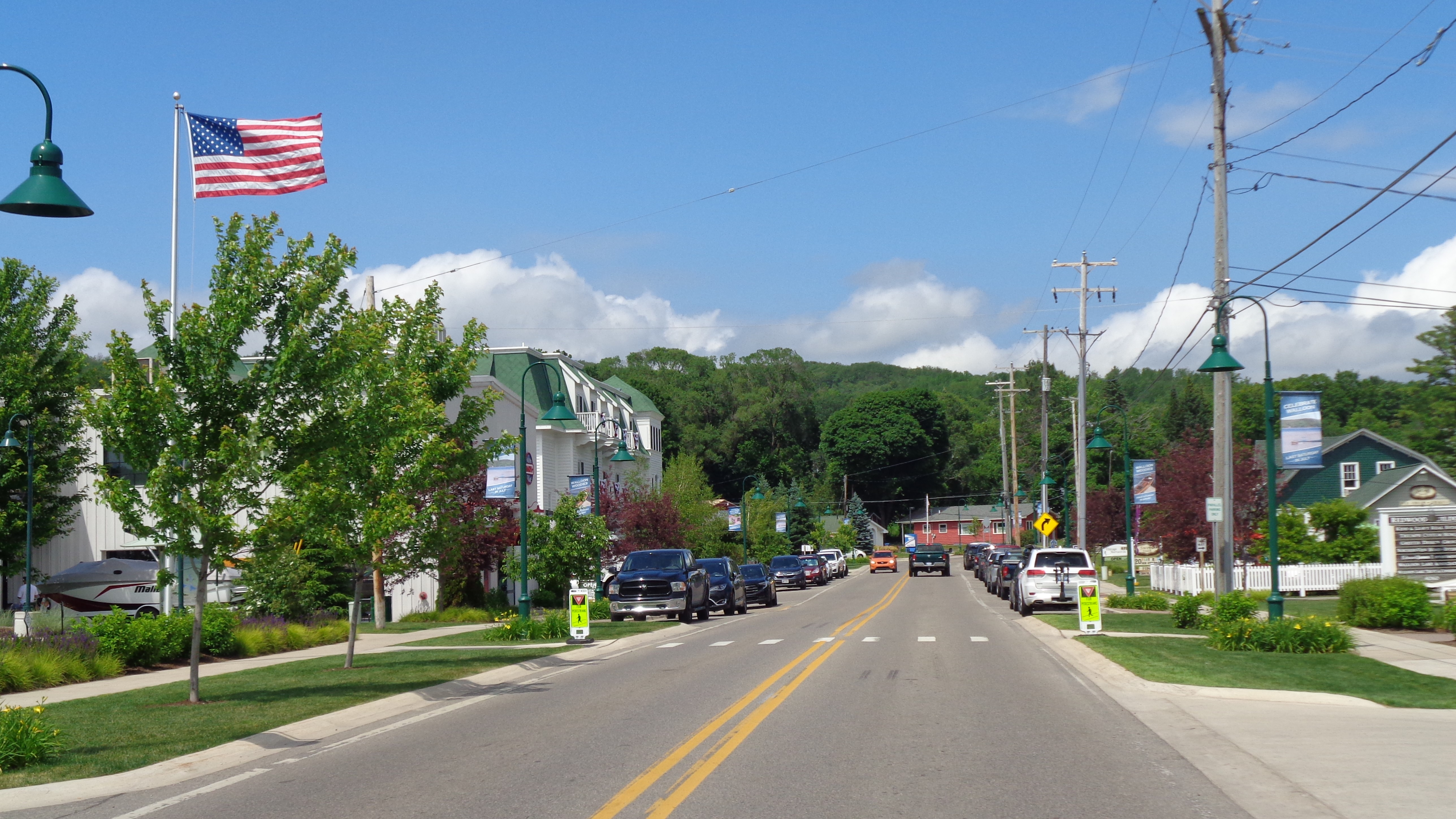
- Walloon Lake along S. Shore Drive (M-75)

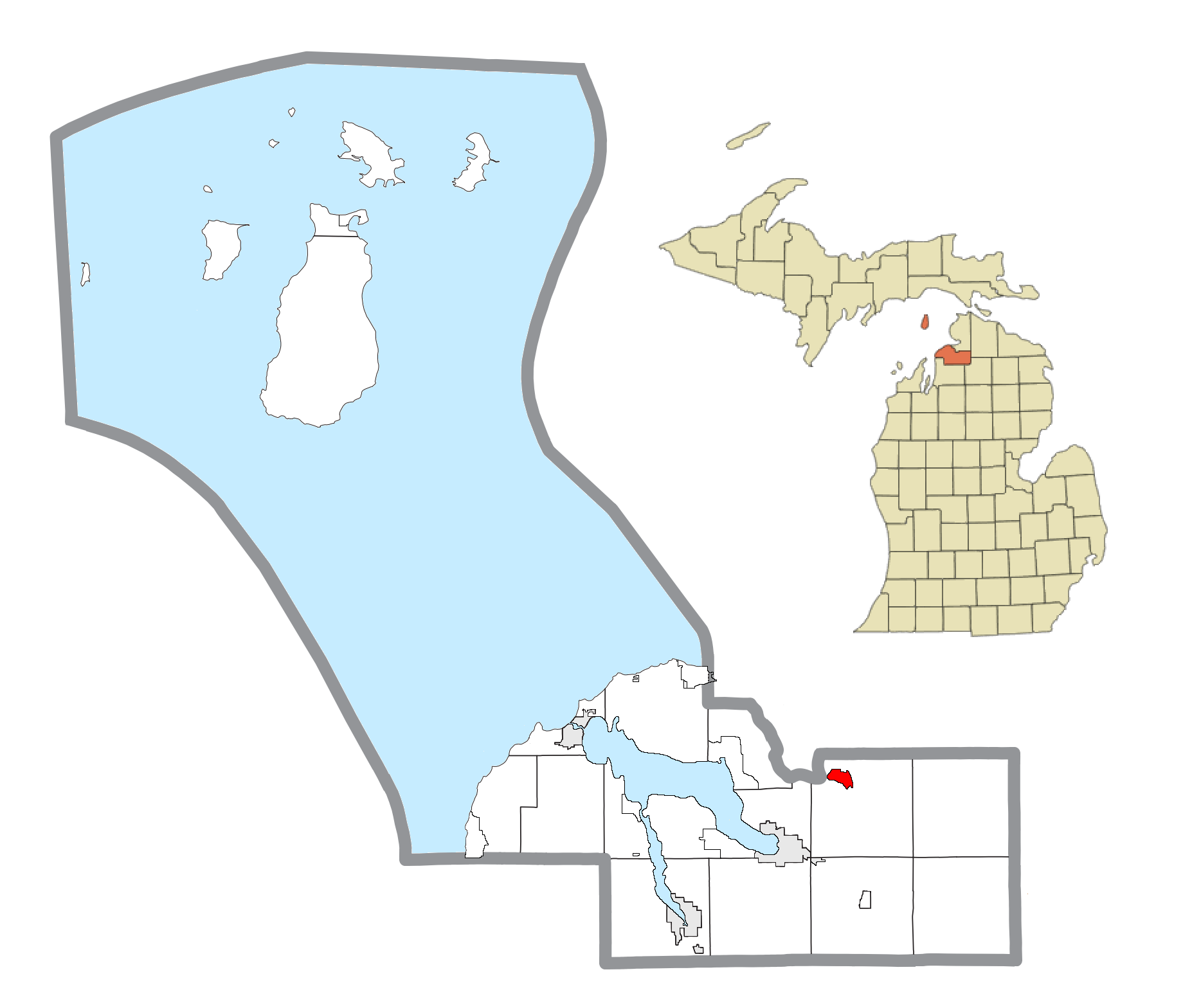
- Location within Charlevoix County

- Location within the state of Michigan Location within the United States
- Coordinates: 45°15′58″N 84°56′00″W
- Country: United States
- State: Michigan
- County: Charlevoix
- Township: Melrose
- Settled: 1872

Area
  - Total: 1.36 sq mi (3.51 km^{2})
  - Land: 1.36 sq mi (3.51 km^{2})
  - Water: 0 sq mi (0.00 km^{2})
- Elevation: 712 ft (217 m)

Population (2020)
  - Total: 271
  - Density: 200.0/sq mi (77.21/km^{2})
- Time zone: UTC-5 (Eastern (EST))
  - Summer (DST): UTC-4 (EDT)
- ZIP code(s): 49712 (Boyne City); 49713 (Boyne Falls); 49796
- Area code: 231
- FIPS code: 26-83140
- GNIS feature ID: 1615729
- Website: Official website

Walloon Lake is an unincorporated community and census-designated place (CDP) in Charlevoix County in the U.S. state of Michigan. The population of the CDP was 271 at the 2020 census. The community is located within Melrose Township.

As an unincorporated community, Walloon Lake has no legal autonomy of its own but does have its own post office with the 49796 ZIP Code.

== History ==
John Jones, Jr. and his family first settled in the area as early as 1872 along the shores of Bear Lake (now known as Walloon Lake). Jones organized for the Grand Rapids and Indiana Railroad to build through the area in 1874. The community received a train depot named Melrose, which was named after early local surveyor Mel Rose. The township itself also adopted the name Melrose, but members of the community applied for a post office named Bear Lake. However, there was already a Bear Lake post office in Michigan. The community received a post office under the name Tolcott on October 19, 1897 with Frank Jones serving as the first postmaster. It was respelled to Talcott on March 4, 1899 and ultimately renamed Walloon Lake on September 22, 1900.

The name Walloon Lake was suggested by local butcher J. R. Haas after he saw the name on an old railroad map. Nobody knew where the name came from or how it ended up on an old map. A group of Walloons from Belgium had settled along Bear Lake many years earlier, but no traces of them remained. The community and the lake soon became known as Walloon Lake, although the lake is still connected to Little Traverse Bay by a stream known as Bear River.

The community of Walloon Lake was listed as a newly-organized census-designated place for the 2010 census, meaning it now has officially defined boundaries and population statistics for the first time.

=== Hemingway at Walloon Lake ===
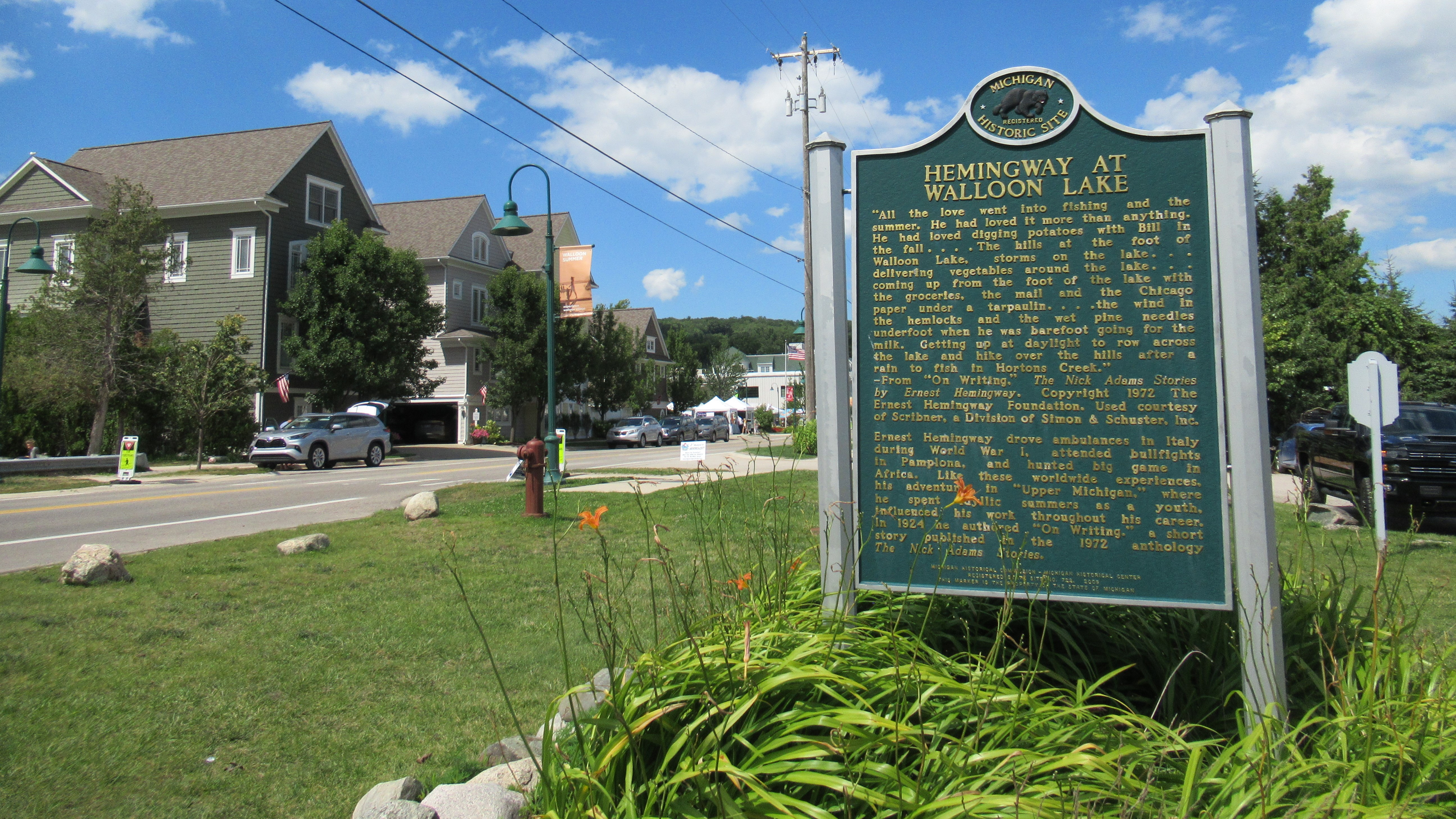
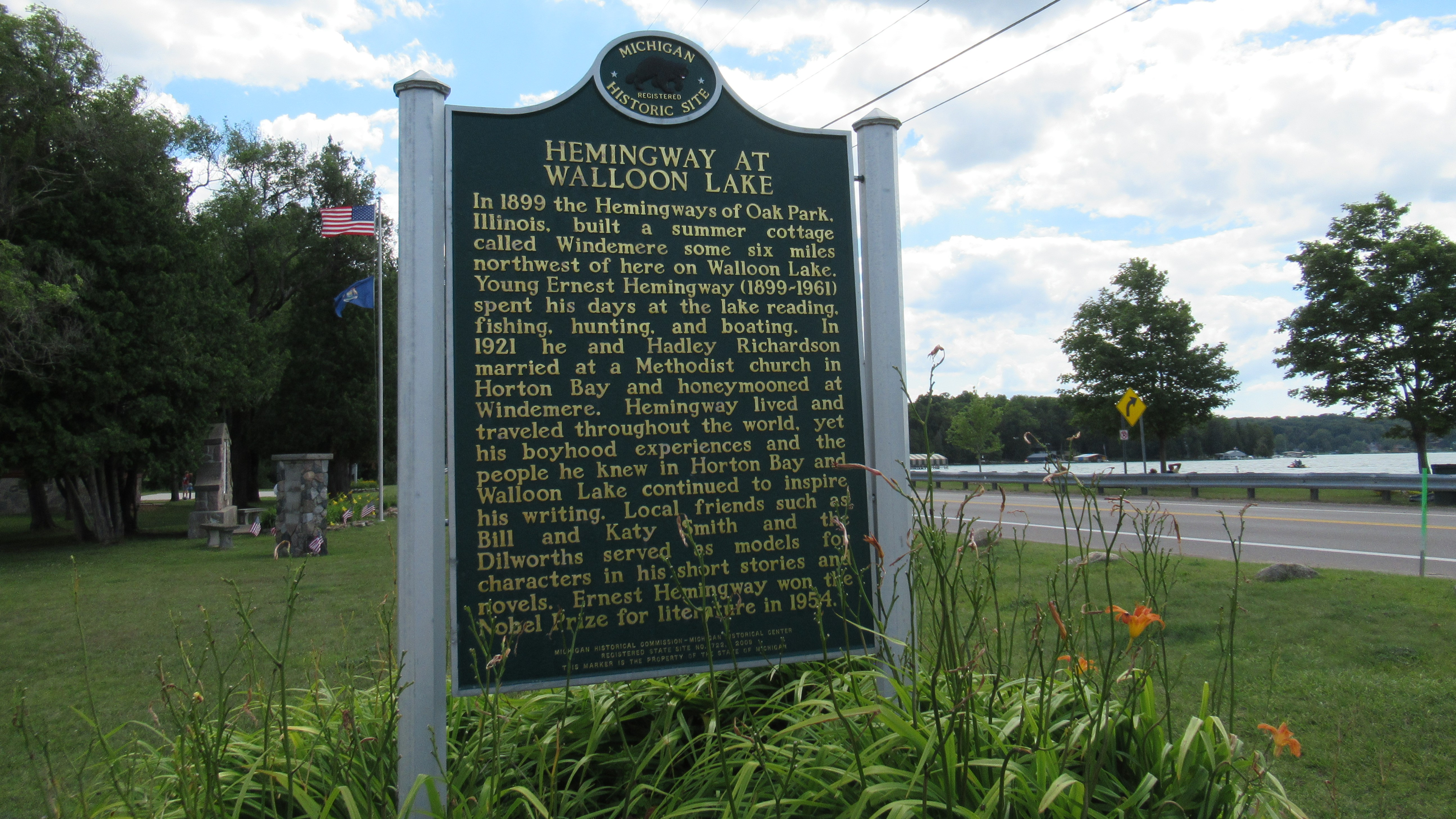
Both sides of the Hemingway at Walloon Lake historic marker

Shortly before Ernest Hemingway was born, the Hemingway family first traveled to northern Michigan in 1898 and settled in Walloon Lake (then known as Tolcatt). The family bought several plots of land around Walloon Lake, and in 1900, they built a cottage they called Windmere on the northern shores of the lake. Even as an infant, Ernest traveled to the area with his family, and this cottage would serve as Ernest's summertime boyhood home, as the family still resided in Chicago. They would travel by ship several times a year to their summer cottage, which was a very difficult and lengthy trip at the time. While in northern Michigan every summer, a young Hemingway would spend most of his time fishing, swimming, tending to the family farm, camping, and eventually finding an interest in writing.

As a teenager, he would travel independently and often spent his time in Walloon Lake, Horton Bay, and the surrounding area. He would also begin making the trip by automobile. In 1921, he married his first wife Hadley Richardson in Horton Bay. Soon after, they left the area and never returned, although he returned at one point in 1951. His time spent in northern Michigan greatly influenced his future writings.

Hemingway's The Nick Adams Stories and its main character were heavily influenced by his adventures and experiences in northern Michigan. Some of his boyhood friends also served as models for many of his characters. Although he lived and traveled all over the world, Hemingway's connection and experiences in the area remained prevalent in his writings. On November 24, 1968, the family cottage in Resort Township was listed on the National Register of Historic Places as a National Historic Landmark—one of only 43 historic landmarks in the state. Hemingway's presence in Walloon Lake was dedicated as a Michigan State Historic Site in 2010 and commemorated with a dual-sided historic marker in Melrose Park in the center of the community.

The Walloon Lake Yacht Club (WYC) has been continually operating since 1907.

== Geography ==
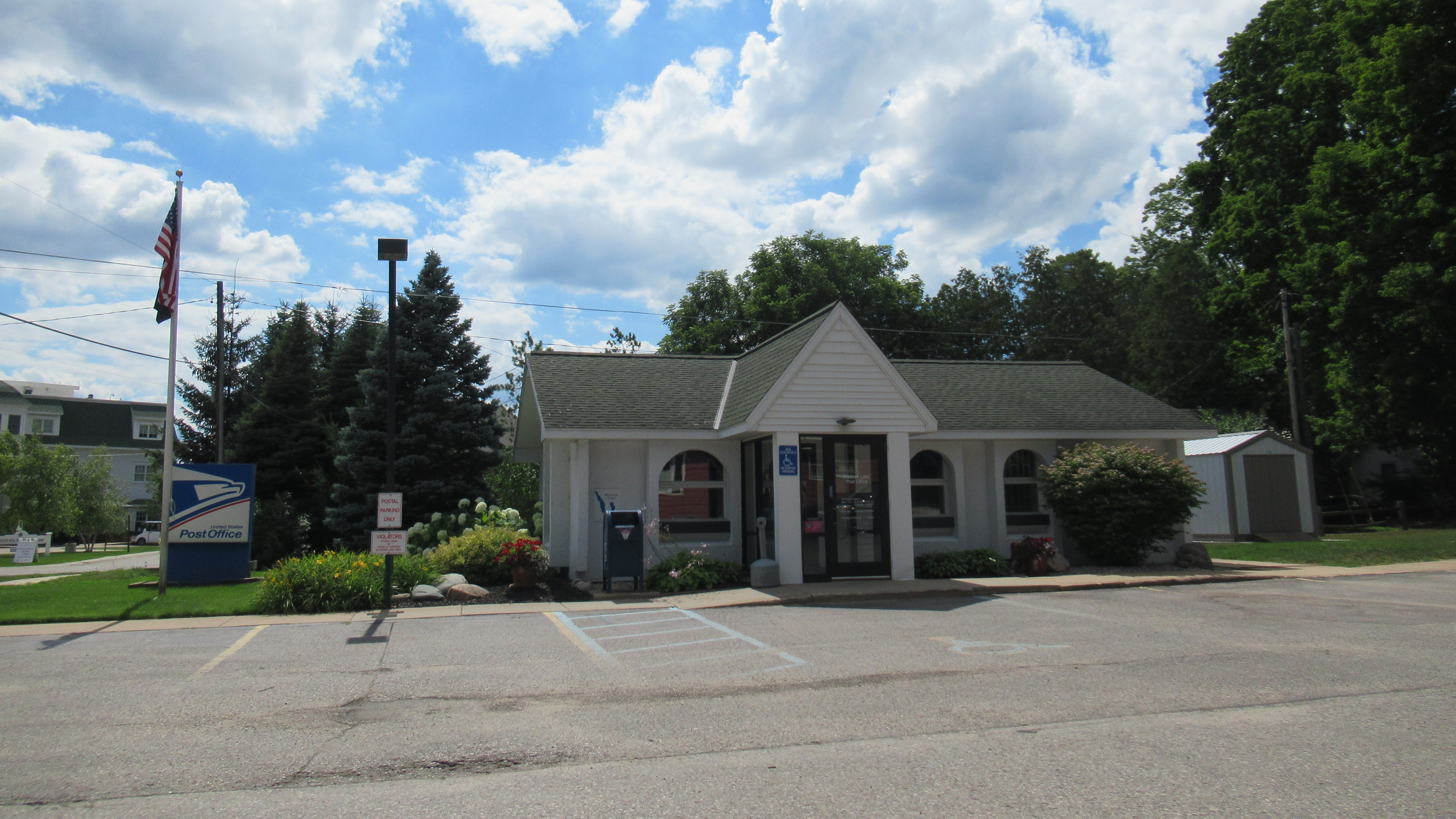
U.S. Post Office in Walloon Lake

According to the U.S. Census Bureau, the Walloon Lake CDP has a total area of 1.35 square miles (3.50 km^{2}), all land.

Walloon Lake is located at the southeastern end of Walloon Lake in eastern Charlevoix County within Melrose Township. The community is located just north of the outlet of the lake into the Bear River.

=== Major highways ===
- US 131 runs south–north through the eastern portion of the community.
- M-75 (South Shore Drive) runs along the southern coast of the lake and terminates at US 131. The roadway continues to the east of US 131 and carries the C-81 designation.
- C-81 (River Road) is a county-designated highway that begins at US 131 east of M-75 and runs out of the eastern portion of the community.

== Demographics ==
Historical population
| Census | Pop. | Note | %± |
|---|---|---|---|
| 1870 | 3 | | — |
| 2010 | 290 | | — |
| 2020 | 271 | | −6.6% |
U.S. Decennial Census

As of the 2020 Census, the racial demographics for Walloon Lake are;

| White | 260 | 95.9% |
| Hispanic | 7 | 2.6% |
| Asian | 2 | 0.7% |
| Native American/Other | 1 | 0.4% |
| Multiracial | 1 | 0.4% |
| Black | 0 | 0.0% |

== Education ==
Walloon Lake is served by two separate school districts. The northern portion of the community may be served by Wolverine Community School, which is located far east in the village of Wolverine in Cheboygan County. The southern portion of the community may be served by Boyne City Public Schools to the southwest in Boyne City.
