= Bayshore Bomb Scoring Site =

Military site

Coordinates: 46°27′N 90°8′W

The Bayshore Bomb Scoring Site ("base facility identifier" 26001F) is a Formerly Used Defense Site (FUDS) that was used as a Strategic Air Command radar station for Radar Bomb Scoring. The site was activated in 1963 at Charlevoix, Michigan by Detachment 6 of the 1CEVG's Radar Bomb Scoring Division. Det 6 moved to the site from Ironwood, Michigan,^{*} and was tracking the 1971 Big Rock Point B-52 crash.

The Bayshore site was rebuilt after a 1967 television fire, closed in 1985.

== Notes ==
- The Ironwood RBS site was established when the unit and equipment moved from Guam (10th RBS Squadron Det 12) in July 1960.
