= Walloon Lake =

Lake in Charlevoix and Emmet counties, Michigan, United States

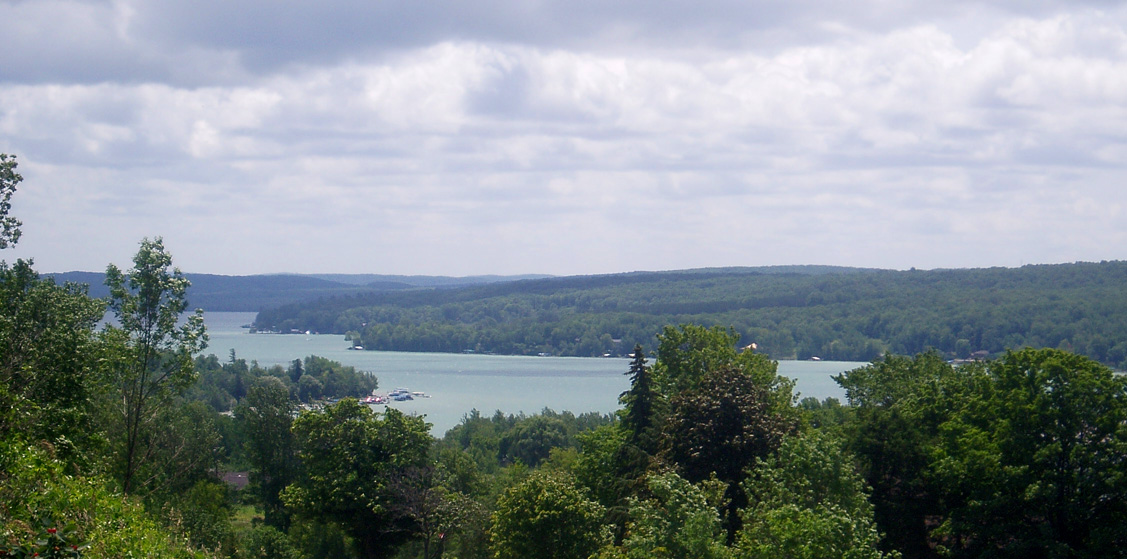
- View of North Arm

- Location within Michigan
- Location: Charlevoix / Emmet counties, Michigan, United States
- Coordinates: 45°17′09″N 85°01′06″W
- Type: Glacial
- Primary inflows: groundwater
- Primary outflows: Bear River
- Basin countries: United States
- Max. length: 9 mi (14 km)
- Max. width: 0.7–1.3 mi (1.1–2.1 km)
- Surface area: 4,270 acres (17.3 km^{2})
- Max. depth: 100 ft (30 m)
- Residence time: 5+ years
- Surface elevation: 686 feet (209 m)
- Settlements: Village of Walloon Lake

Walloon Lake is a glacier-formed lake located in Charlevoix and Emmet counties, just southwestward from the northern tip of the Lower Peninsula of Michigan. It is now home to many vacation homes and cottages. Though the end of the west arm of the lake is less than 1 mile (1.6 km) from Lake Michigan, Walloon Lake's surface elevation is over 100 feet (30 m) higher. The Bear River drains from the east end of the lake in Walloon Lake village, winding east then north down to its outflow into Lake Michigan at the south end of Petoskey.

== Ecology ==
Locals refer to their cottages as being on the "west arm", or the "foot", etc. The lake covers 4,270 acres (17.3 km^{2}) and is primarily fed from groundwater. Its maximum depth is just over 100 feet (30 m). Recently, the introduction of the invasive zebra mussel has made the clear waters even clearer. For a few months after the ice melts (usually in April), it is possible to see to the bottom of the lake at depths up to 30 feet.

== Current use ==
Real-estate value has increased rapidly since the 1970s, and many large houses have been built around the lake. There are two currently active camps on the lake: Camp Daggett and Camp Michigania built on the site of the prior Camp Huntington/Sherwood which was purchased in 1962 by the University of Michigan's Alumni Association. Starting around 2010, the area on the foot of the lake began redevelopment. New condominiums were constructed. In the next few years, a restaurant was built, and a retail store was created on the site of the old SI's marine. In 2014 developers broke ground on a new hotel to sit in between the marina and condominiums.

== Transportation ==
Indian Trails provides daily intercity bus service between St. Ignace and East Lansing, Michigan.

== Historic sites ==
=== Windemere ===
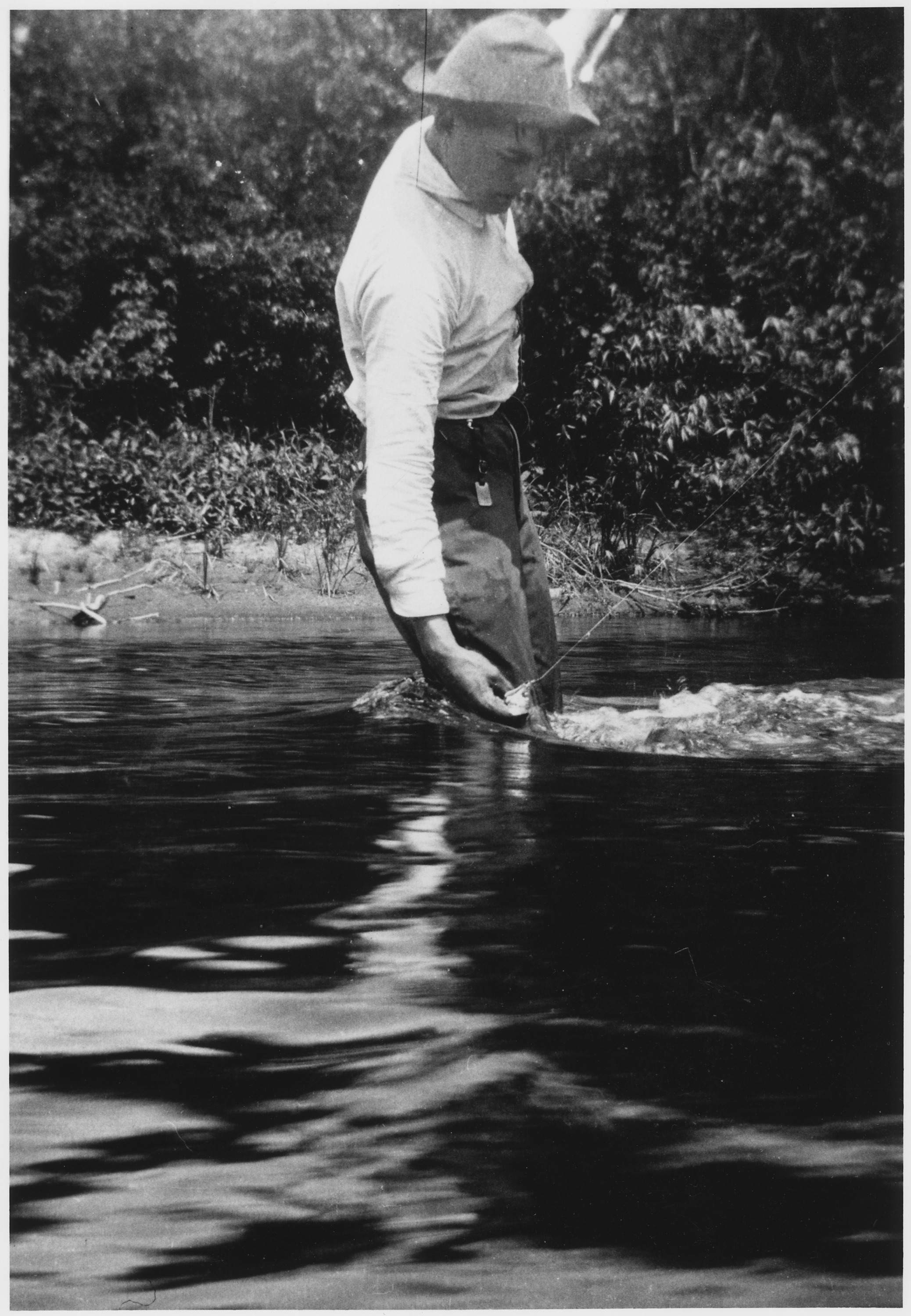
Ernest Hemingway fishing at Walloon Lake

Located on the north shore of Walloon Lake, Windemere was the childhood summer home of Ernest Hemingway. The house is still owned by the Hemingway family and is home to one of Hemingway's nephews.

=== The Walloon Lake Inn ===
Originally named Fern Cottage, the inn was a destination point for many visitors and also served as a docking point for the steamboats that would take the travelers to hotels or to their cottages on the lake. The inn has been renovated over the last thirty years and now serves the community as a fine dining restaurant. The inn also houses a French-style restaurant and a culinary school.

== See also ==
- List of lakes in Michigan
