= Chandler Township, Charlevoix County, Michigan =

Chandler Township, Michigan
- Civil township
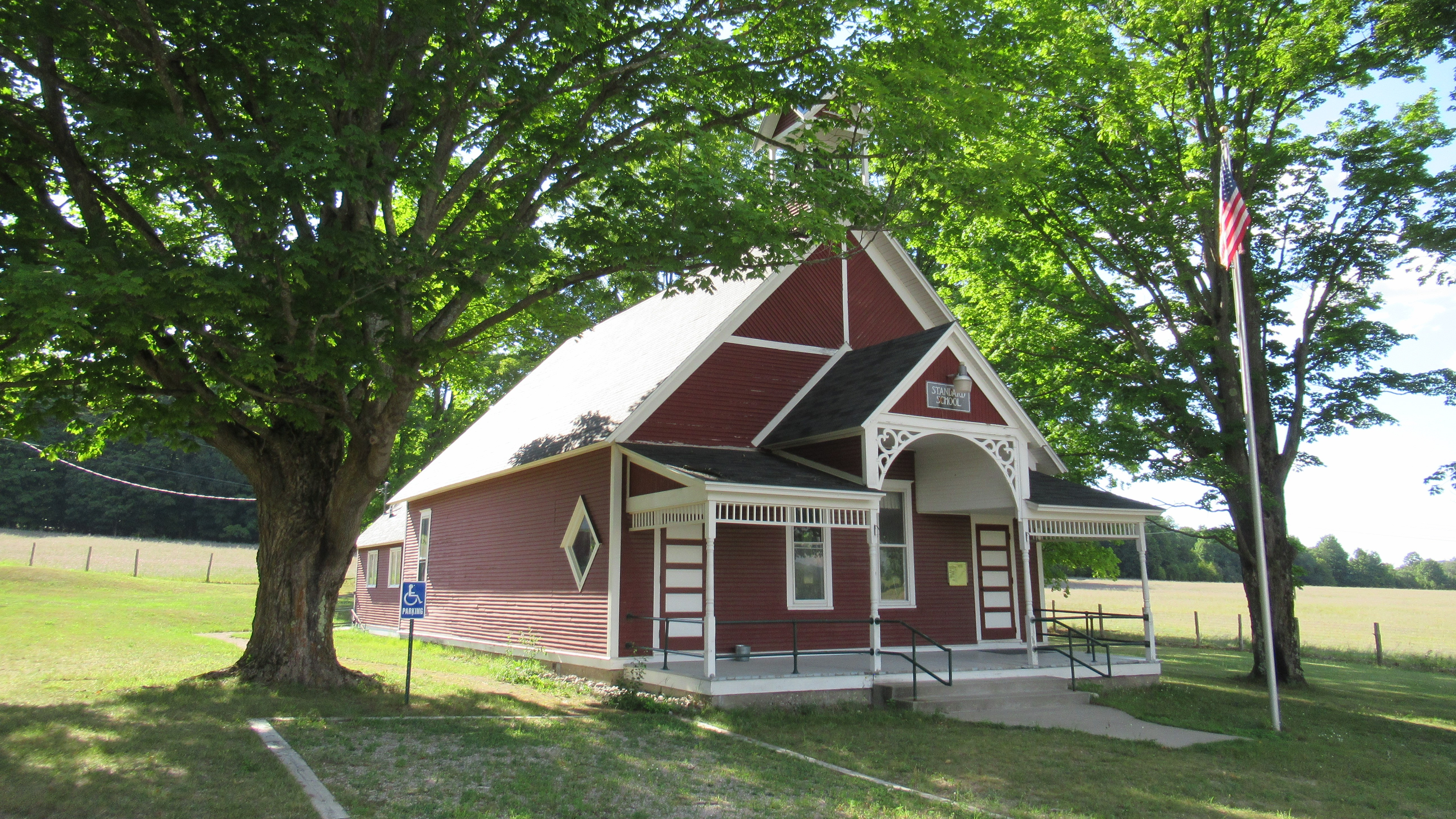
- Standard School (Chandler Township Hall)

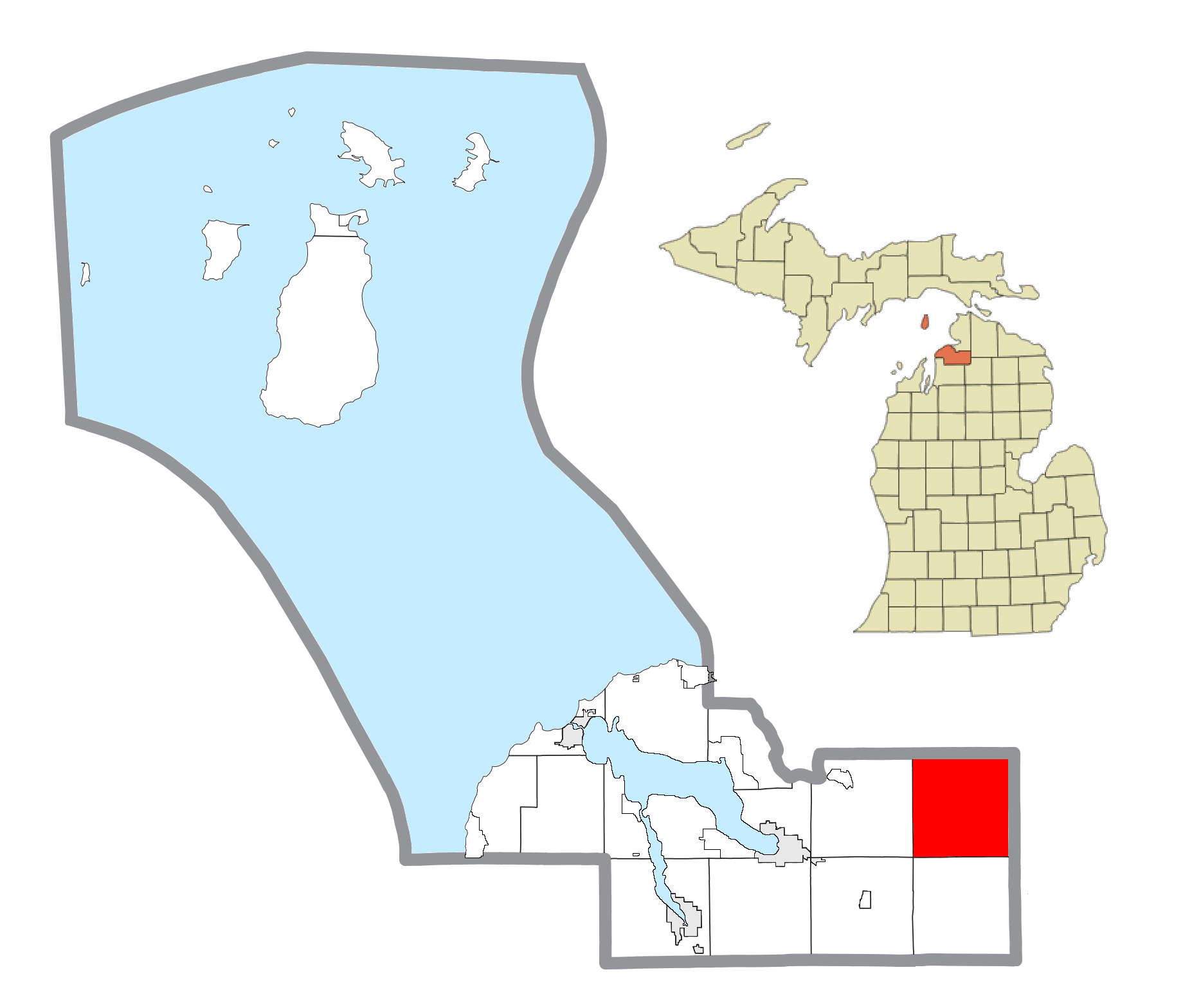
- Location within Charlevoix County

- Location within the state of Michigan Location within the United States
- Coordinates: 45°14′14″N 84°46′57″W
- Country: United States
- State: Michigan
- County: Charlevoix
- Established: 1880

Area
  - Total: 35.62 sq mi (92.26 km^{2})
  - Land: 35.60 sq mi (92.20 km^{2})
  - Water: 0.019 sq mi (0.05 km^{2})
- Elevation: 879 ft (268 m)

Population (2020)
  - Total: 284
  - Density: 7.98/sq mi (3.08/km^{2})
- Time zone: UTC-5 (Eastern (EST))
  - Summer (DST): UTC-4 (EDT)
- ZIP code(s): 49713 (Boyne Falls); 49770 (Petoskey)
- Area code: 231
- FIPS code: 26-14560
- GNIS feature ID: 1626056
- Website: Official website

Chandler Township is a civil township of Charlevoix County in the U.S. state of Michigan. The population was 284 at the 2020 census.

== Communities ==
- Dot is a historic settlement located within the township. A post office operated here from May 17, 1880 until June 15, 1901.
- Spring Vale is a former lumbering community in the southeastern portion of the township near the county line with Cheboygan County. The community began in 1879 by the dominant Cadillac lumber firm Cobbs & Mitchell, owned by Johnathon Cobbs and George A. Mitchell. A post office named Spring Vale opened on May 6, 1879 with George Mohorter serving as the first postmaster, who operated the post office from his general store. After the decline in the lumber industry, the community was abandoned and torn down by 1925. The community appeared on a 1911 map of Charlevoix County.

== Geography ==
According to the U.S. Census Bureau, the township has a total area of 35.62 square miles (92.26 km^{2}), of which 35.60 square miles (92.20 km^{2}) is land and 0.02 square miles (0.05 km^{2}) (0.06%) is water.

== Demographics ==
Historical population
Census	Pop.	Note	%±
2000	230		—
2010	248		7.8%
2020	284		14.5%

As of the census of 2000, there were 230 people, 86 households, and 62 families residing in the township. The population density was 6.5 inhabitants per square mile (2.5/km^{2}). There were 142 housing units at an average density of 4.0 per square mile (1.5/km^{2}). The racial makeup of the township was 98.26% White, 0.43% African American, 0.87% Asian, and 0.43% from two or more races.

There were 86 households, out of which 30.2% had children under the age of 18 living with them, 61.6% were married couples living together, 5.8% had a female householder with no husband present, and 27.9% were non-families. 22.1% of all households were made up of individuals, and 2.3% had someone living alone who was 65 years of age or older. The average household size was 2.67 and the average family size was 3.08.

In the township the population was spread out, with 27.4% under the age of 18, 7.4% from 18 to 24, 28.7% from 25 to 44, 29.6% from 45 to 64, and 7.0% who were 65 years of age or older. The median age was 37 years. For every 100 females, there were 111.0 males. For every 100 females age 18 and over, there were 114.1 males.

The median income for a household in the township was $43,750, and the median income for a family was $48,542. Males had a median income of $32,083 versus $21,250 for females. The per capita income for the township was $24,855. About 2.9% of families and 4.3% of the population were below the poverty line, including 5.0% of those under the age of eighteen and none of those 65 or over.

== Education ==
Chandler Township is served by two separate school districts. The majority of the township is served by [Petoskey Public Schools][Emmett County] The southeast corner of the township is served by Vanderbilt Area Schools in the village of Vanderbilt to the southeast in Otsego County.
