= Melrose Township, Michigan =

- Civil township
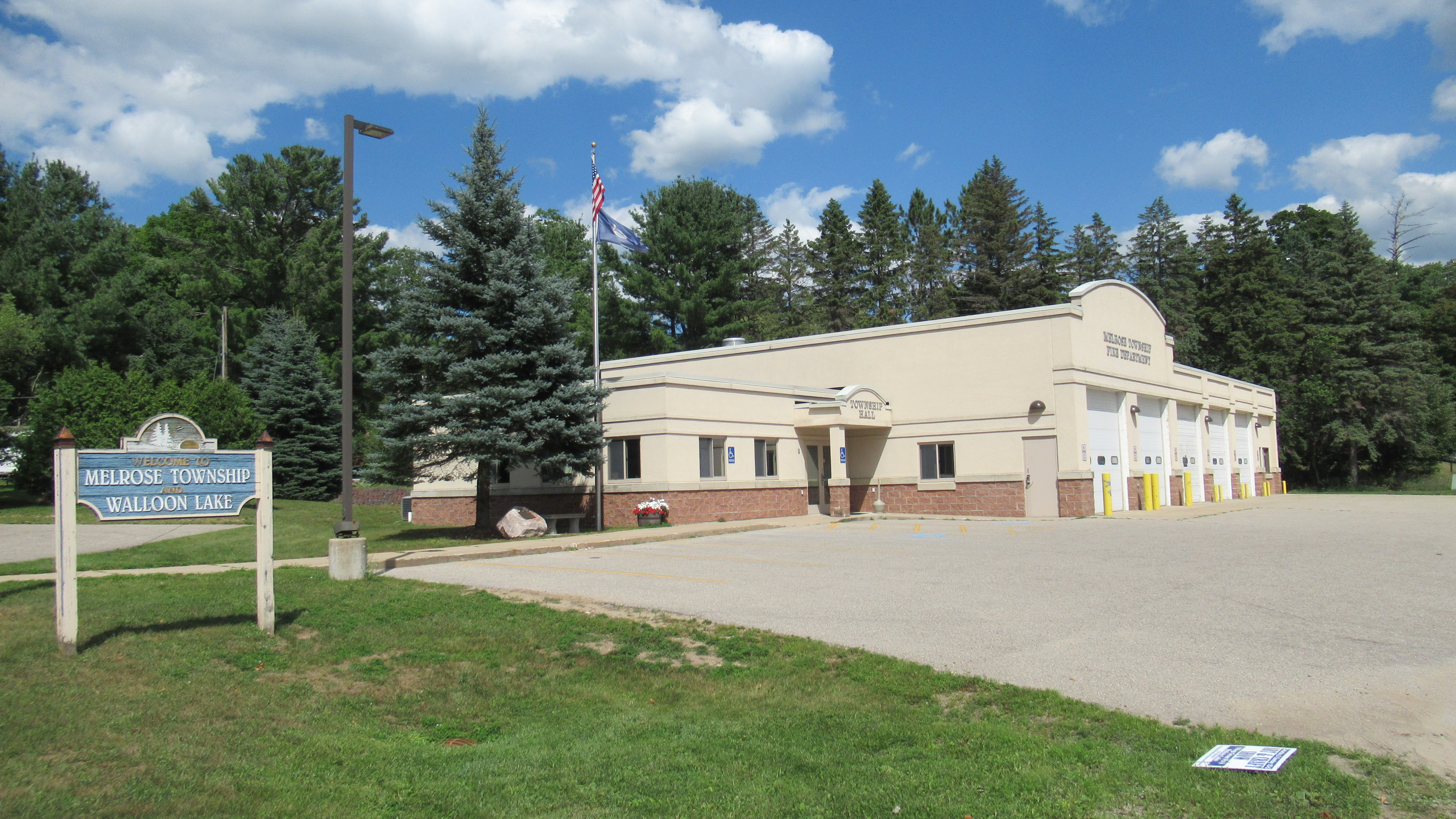
- Melrose Township Hall and Fire Department

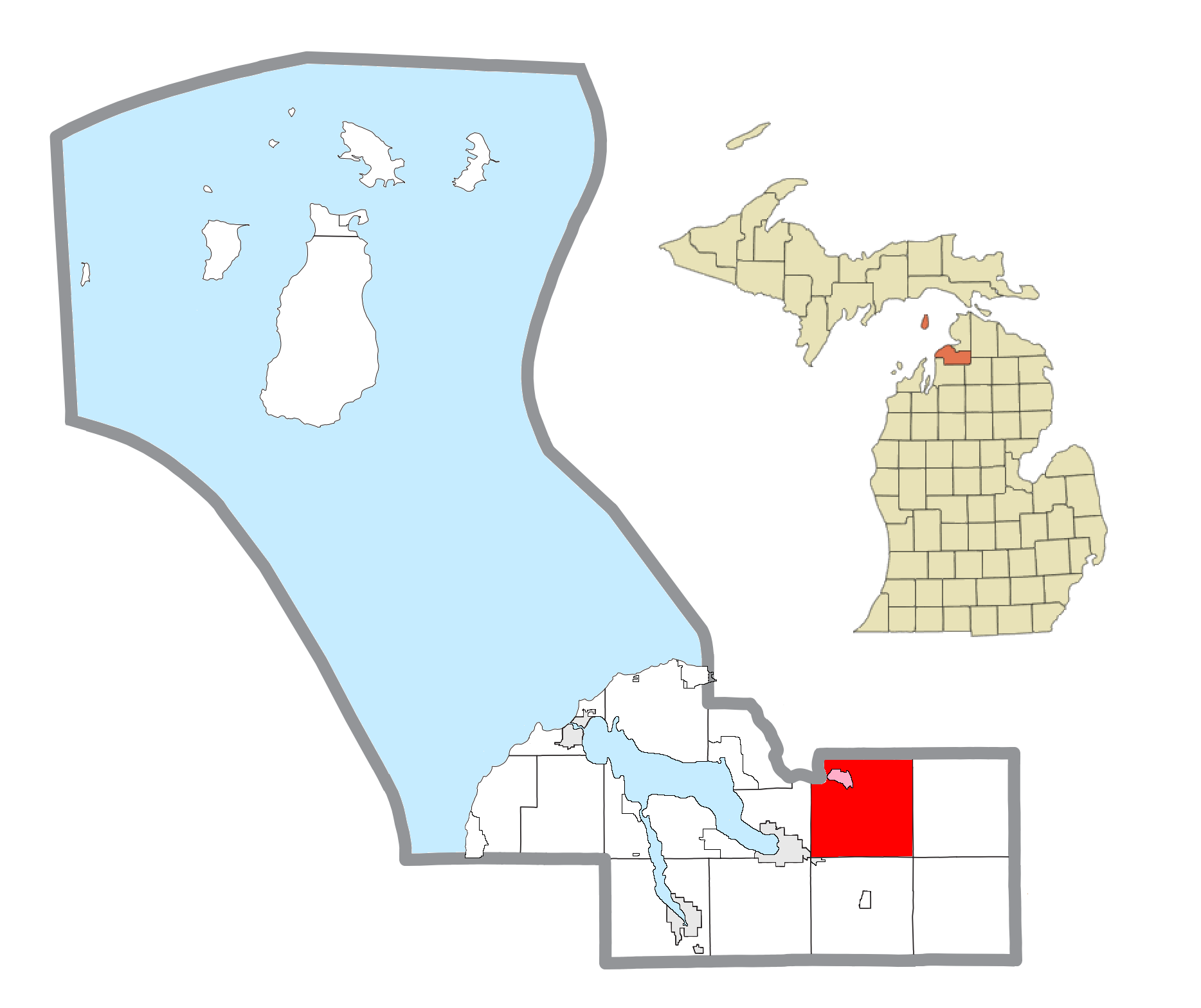
- Location within Charlevoix County (red) and the administered CDP of Walloon Lake (pink)

- Location within the state of Michigan Location within the United States
- Coordinates: 45°15′06″N 84°55′11″W
- Country: United States
- State: Michigan
- County: Charlevoix
- Established: 1877

Government
  - Supervisor: Vern Goodwin
  - Clerk: Robin Hissong Berry

Area
  - Total: 35.00 sq mi (90.65 km^{2})
  - Land: 32.98 sq mi (85.42 km^{2})
  - Water: 2.02 sq mi (5.23 km^{2})
- Elevation: 676 ft (206 m)

Population (2020)
  - Total: 1,405
  - Density: 42.60/sq mi (16.45/km^{2})
- Time zone: UTC-5 (Eastern (EST))
  - Summer (DST): UTC-4 (EDT)
- ZIP code(s): 49712 (Boyne City); 49713 (Boyne Falls); 49796 (Walloon Lake)
- Area code: 231
- FIPS code: 26-52880
- GNIS feature ID: 1626719
- Website: Official website

Melrose Township is a civil township of Charlevoix County in the U.S. state of Michigan. The population was 1,405 at the 2020 census.

The township was set off from Evangeline Township by the County Board of Supervisors in 1877.

== Communities ==
- Clarion is an unincorporated community located within the township at 45°16′42″N 84°55′24″W. The settlement began as early as 1874 by John Darrah from Kent County, and his family homesteaded in the area by the following year. He became the first postmaster when the Clarion post office opened on December 8, 1879. It was named after Clarion, Pennsylvania. The community also received a train station along the Grand Rapids and Indiana Railroad. The post office operated until October 31, 1945.
- Lake Junction was a historic settlement that formed around a railway junction that connected the Clarion and Walloon Lake train stations along the Grand Rapids and Indiana Railroad. The junction appeared in Melrose Township on a 1911 map of Charlevoix County.
- Troutdale is a former community located within the township on the southern shores of Bear Lake (now Walloon Lake). It was given a post office that operated briefly from September 11, 1879 until August 17, 1881.
- Walloon Lake is an unincorporated community and census-designated place located along the eastern shores of Walloon Lake at 45°15′58″N 84°56′00″W.

== Geography ==
According to the U.S. Census Bureau, the township has a total area of 35.00 square miles (90.65 km^{2}), of which 32.98 square miles (85.42 km^{2}) is land and 2.02 square miles (5.23 km^{2}) (5.77%) is water.

The township contains the eastern coastline of Walloon Lake.

=== Major highways ===
- US 131 runs south–north through the center of the township.
- M-75 (South Shore Drive) runs through the west-central portion of the township and terminates at US 131. The roadway continues to the east of US 131 and carries the C-81 designation.
- C-81 (River Road) is a county-designated highway that begins at US 131 east of M-75 and runs through the northern portion of the township.

== Demographics ==
As of the census of 2000, there were 1,388 people, 517 households, and 387 families residing in the township. The population density was 42.2 inhabitants per square mile (16.3/km^{2}). There were 875 housing units at an average density of 26.6 per square mile (10.3/km^{2}). The racial makeup of the township was 98.05% White, 0.07% African American, 0.65% Native American, 0.07% Pacific Islander, 0.14% from other races, and 1.01% from two or more races. Hispanic or Latino of any race were 1.08% of the population.

There were 517 households, out of which 36.4% had children under the age of 18 living with them, 64.8% were married couples living together, 7.4% had a female householder with no husband present, and 25.0% were non-families. 19.7% of all households were made up of individuals, and 6.0% had someone living alone who was 65 years of age or older. The average household size was 2.67 and the average family size was 3.09.

In the township the population was spread out, with 28.7% under the age of 18, 5.3% from 18 to 24, 31.8% from 25 to 44, 22.2% from 45 to 64, and 11.9% who were 65 years of age or older. The median age was 36 years. For every 100 females, there were 101.5 males. For every 100 females age 18 and over, there were 97.8 males.

The median income for a household in the township was $41,000, and the median income for a family was $45,385. Males had a median income of $29,813 versus $21,620 for females. The per capita income for the township was $20,426. About 5.4% of families and 8.2% of the population were below the poverty line, including 11.5% of those under age 18 and 2.2% of those age 65 or over.

== Education ==
Melrose Township is served by three separate school districts. Most of the township is served by Wolverine Community Schools to the northeast in the village of Wolverine in Cheboygan County. The southwest portion of the township is served by Boyne City Public Schools to the southwest in the city of Boyne City. A small southeastern portion of the township is served by Boyne Falls Public School District to the south in Boyne Valley Township.
