= Resort Township, Michigan =

- Civil township
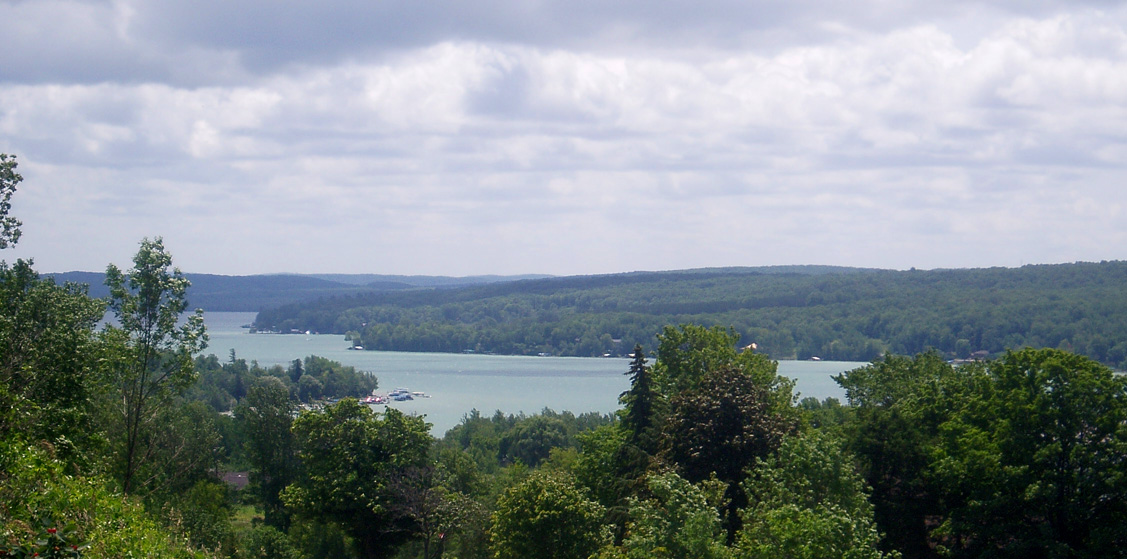
- Walloon Lake

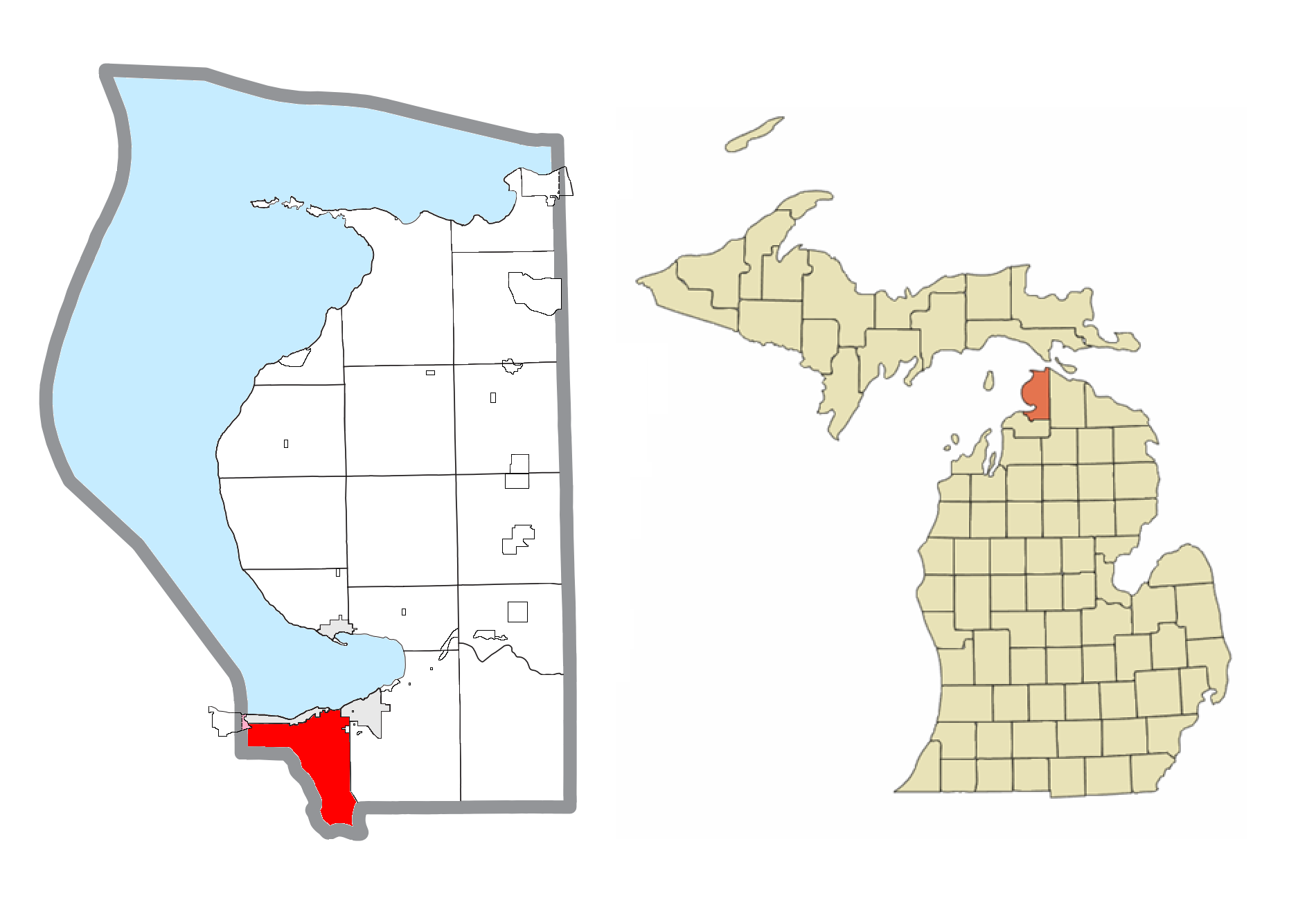
- Location within Emmet County (red) and an administered portion of the Bay Shore community (pink)

- Location within the state of Michigan Resort Township (the United States)
- Coordinates: 45°20′16″N 85°01′00″W
- Country: United States
- State: Michigan
- County: Emmet

Government
  - Supervisor: Robert Wheaton
  - Clerk: Rufus Welsheimer

Area
  - Total: 21.60 sq mi (55.9 km^{2})
  - Land: 19.13 sq mi (49.5 km^{2})
  - Water: 2.47 sq mi (6.4 km^{2})
- Elevation: 820 ft (250 m)

Population (2020)
  - Total: 2,835
  - Density: 141/sq mi (54/km^{2})
- Time zone: UTC-5 (Eastern (EST))
  - Summer (DST): UTC-4 (EDT)
- ZIP code(s): 49770 (Petoskey)
- Area code: 231
- FIPS code: 26-68060
- GNIS feature ID: 1626965
- Website: https://www.resorttownship.gov/

Resort Township is a civil township of Emmet County in the U.S. state of Michigan. The southwesternmost township of Emmet County, Resort Township is immediately adjacent Petoskey, the county seat and largest city in Emmet County. Resort Township also has a shoreline on Little Traverse Bay, a bay of Lake Michigan. At the 2020 census, the population was 2,835, an increase from 2,697 at the 2010 census.

== Geography ==
According to the United States Census Bureau, the township has a total area of 21.60 square miles (55.9 km^{2}), of which 19.13 square miles (49.5 km^{2}) is land and 2.47 square miles (6.4 km^{2}) (11.44%) is water.

Resort Township has shorelines on both Little Traverse Bay (Lake Michigan) and Walloon Lake. Charlevoix County is south and west of Resort Township.

The city of Petoskey is north and northeast of Resort Township. The community of Bay Shore is also in the northwest of the township.

=== Major highway ===
- US 31 runs west–east through the north of the township, paralleling Little Traverse Bay. US 31 runs north to Mackinaw City and south to Charlevoix and Traverse City, further south along the Lake Michigan coast.

== Demographics ==
As of the census of 2000, there were 2,479 people, 894 households, and 722 families residing in the township. The population density was 129.7 inhabitants per square mile (50.1/km^{2}). There were 1,215 housing units at an average density of 63.6 per square mile (24.6/km^{2}). The racial makeup of the township was 95.76% White, 0.08% African American, 2.46% Native American, 0.56% Asian, 0.04% Pacific Islander, 0.20% from other races, and 0.89% from two or more races. Hispanic or Latino of any race were 0.52% of the population.

There were 894 households, out of which 36.8% had children under the age of 18 living with them, 69.9% were married couples living together, 8.1% had a female householder with no husband present, and 19.2% were non-families. 16.0% of all households were made up of individuals, and 5.6% had someone living alone who was 65 years of age or older. The average household size was 2.77 and the average family size was 3.09.

In the township the population was spread out, with 27.1% under the age of 18, 7.5% from 18 to 24, 28.0% from 25 to 44, 25.7% from 45 to 64, and 11.8% who were 65 years of age or older. The median age was 39 years. For every 100 females, there were 98.0 males. For every 100 females age 18 and over, there were 93.9 males.

The median income for a household in the township was $52,772, and the median income for a family was $58,629. Males had a median income of $39,643 versus $24,524 for females. The per capita income for the township was $25,080. About 1.8% of families and 3.4% of the population were below the poverty line, including 3.2% of those under age 18 and 7.5% of those age 65 or over.
