= National Register of Historic Places listings in Charlevoix County, Michigan =

Location of Charlevoix County in Michigan

This is a list of the National Register of Historic Places listings in Charlevoix County, Michigan.

This is intended to be a complete list of the properties and districts on the National Register of Historic Places in Charlevoix County, Michigan, United States. Latitude and longitude coordinates are provided for many National Register properties and districts; these locations may be seen together in a map.

There are 25 properties and districts listed on the National Register in the county.

This National Park Service list is complete through NPS recent listings posted September 26, 2025.

== Current listings ==
	Name on the Register	Image	Date listed	Location	City or town	Description
1	Beaver Island Light Station	Beaver Island Light Station	December 29, 1978 (#78001495)	S of St. James on Beaver Island; 45°34′35″N 85°34′21″W	St. James	The yellow brick lighthouse keeper's dwelling at this site was constructed in 1866. The attached 46-foot (14 m) cylindrical tower was built in 1858, to replace an 1852 tower. The decagonal lantern room offers panoramic vistas of the Lake. The tower is open to the public from 8:00 a.m. though 9:00 p.m. during the summer.
2	Boyne City Central Historic District	Boyne City Central Historic District	December 19, 2012 (#12001071)	Water, Pearl, Lake, Ray & Main Sts. 45°12′46″N 85°00′48″W	Boyne City	This district encompasses the primary commercial area of Boyne City, and the adjacent Pearl Street residential district. Buildings in the district date substantially from Boyne City's heyday in 1900-1910.
3	Boyne City Water Works Building	Boyne City Water Works Building	August 14, 1998 (#98001060)	210 E. Division St. 45°12′17″N 85°00′49″W	Boyne City	This water works building served the Boyne City populace from 1910 until 1988, when a new pump building replaced it. It was vacant and unused until 2011, when it was refurbished and placed back into service as a booster station.
4	Charlevoix Central Historic District	Charlevoix Central Historic District	April 9, 2025 (#100011634)	Roughly bounded by State St, East Dixon Ave, Antrim St, and Round Lake; 45°19′02″N 85°15′31″W	Charlevoix	
5	Charlevoix City Park Site	Charlevoix City Park Site	March 16, 1972 (#72000602)	Park between Bridge Street and Round Lake; 45°19′00″N 85°15′30″W	Charlevoix	The site is a Woodland period occupation, approximately AD 1000 - AD 1300.
6	Charlevoix South Pierhead Light	Charlevoix South Pierhead Light	April 28, 2005 (#05000346)	S pier at harbor entrance, 0.3 WNW of US 31 drawbridge 45°19′13″N 85°15′54″W	Charlevoix	The first light in Charlevoix, built in 1884, was located on the north pier. This light was replaced in 1948 with the current steel structure, which was located on the south pier. The lens and lantern from the old structure were transferred to the new one.
7	Chicago and West Michigan Railroad Charlevoix Station	Chicago and West Michigan Railroad Charlevoix Station	November 29, 1995 (#95001393)	Chicago Ave. 45°19′03″N 85°14′35″W	Charlevoix	This building, constructed in 1892, served rail passengers until 1962. It has been renovated, and is currently owned by the Charlevoix Historical Society.
8	East Jordan Lumber Company Store Building	East Jordan Lumber Company Store Building	July 3, 2008 (#08000586)	104 Main St. 45°09′15″N 85°07′39″W	East Jordan	Built in 1899, this building shares a wall with the adjoining Votruba Block. Both buildings have been rehabilitated to form the Main Street Center office complex.
9	Garden Island Indian Cemetery	Garden Island Indian Cemetery	February 17, 1978 (#78001494)	On island, 45°48′10″N 85°30′30″W	Garden Island	Also designated 20CX12, this Indian Cemetery holds about 3500 graves, and has been called the largest Indian cemetery in the United States.
10	Greensky Hill Mission	Greensky Hill Mission	March 16, 1972 (#72000603)	E of Charlevoix at jct. of US 31 and CR 630; 45°19′42″N 85°11′05″W	Charlevoix	This church was founded in 1844 by Peter Greensky (1807-1866) also known as Shagasokicki, a Chippewa chief who had been converted to Christianity and became a preacher. The first services were held in makeshift buildings of bark and boughs until the 1850s, when a church was constructed from lumber brought by canoe from Traverse City.
11	Horton Bay General Store	Horton Bay General Store	September 23, 1991 (#91001411)	05115 Boyne City Rd., Bay Township; 45°17′06″N 85°04′48″W	Horton Bay	Dating from 1877/78, the Horton Bay General Store is mentioned in two of Ernest Hemingway's short stories, "Up in Michigan" and "The Last Good Country." The store has operated more or less continuously since its construction.
12	Horton Bay House-Red Fox Inn	Horton Bay House-Red Fox Inn	April 7, 1995 (#95000372)	05156 Boyne City Rd., Bay Township; 45°17′06″N 85°04′45″W	Horton Bay	Dating from 1877/78, the Red Fox Inn is mentioned in Ernest Hemingway's short story, "Up in Michigan," and tradition has it that the inn's proprietor during the 1910s and 20s, Vollie Fox, taught Hemingway how to fish. It is now a memoriabili and book store.
13	Horton Bay School	Horton Bay School	January 4, 2001 (#00001603)	04991 Boyne City-Charlevoix Rd. 45°17′04″N 85°04′37″W	Bay Township	Built during the 1885/86 school year, this school was moved to its present location in the late 1940s, and served students until 1963.
14	Loeb Farms Barn Complex	Loeb Farms Barn Complex	November 29, 1995 (#95001392)	05052 M-66 Hwy. N., SE of Charlevoix, Marion Township; 45°16′43″N 85°13′46″W	Charlevoix	Now known as Castle Farms, this complex was constructed in 1918 by Albert Loeb, who was the Vice President of Sears, Roebuck and Company as a model farm to showcase livestock.
15	Mormon Print Shop	Mormon Print Shop	January 25, 1971 (#71000386)	Main and Forest Sts. 45°44′46″N 85°31′16″W	St. James	The Mormon Print Shop was built in 1850 by the followers of James Strang, who founded a Mormon sect after the death of Joseph Smith. It is now used by the Beaver Island Historical Society as a historical museum, the Old Mormon Print Shop Museum
16	Mt. McSauba Site	Mt. McSauba Site	September 29, 1976 (#76001025)	Near Mt. McSauba, north of Charlevoix, Michigan; 45°20′10″N 85°15′00″W	Charlevoix	Also designated 20CX23, the site is an encampment on a dune.
17	O'Neill Site	O'Neill Site	May 27, 1971 (#71001019)	5 km south of Charlevoix, Michigan; 45°17′10″N 85°20′40″W	Charlevoix	Also designated 20CX18, this is a partially stratified Late Woodland period site.
18	Pewangoing Quarry		June 20, 1972 (#72001471)	Along Lake Michigan, north of Norwood, Michigan; 45°14′50″N 85°22′55″W	Norwood Township	Also designated 20CX20, this site provided flint used in tool-making from the Early Archaic through Late Woodland periods.
19	Pi-wan-go-ning Prehistoric District		October 3, 1973 (#73002153)	Along Lake Michigan, north of Norwood, Michigan; 45°15′10″N 85°22′45″W	Norwood	This district includes three sites: Pewangoning Quarry (20CX20); Whiskey Creek (20CX22); and Fritz Trail (20CX21) where chert was quarried.
20	Pine River Site	Pine River Site	November 15, 1972 (#72001472)	Pine River channel 45°19′10″N 85°15′40″W	Charlevoix	Also designated 20CX19, this is a multicomponent site, with evidence of occupation during the Archaic (c. 3000 BC), Middle Woodland (c. AD 100), and Late Woodland periods (c. AD 1400).
21	John J. and Eva Reynier Porter Estate	John J. and Eva Reynier Porter Estate	August 3, 1998 (#98000269)	01787 M-66 S 45°10′44″N 85°09′45″W	South Arm Township	Also known as Elm Pointe, this estate was built for John J. Porter and his wife Eva in about 1925. John J. Porter and his father William P. Porter headed the East Jordan Lumber Company and later the East Jordan Canning Company. The estate is now a public park, and houses the East Jordan Portside Art and Historical Society Museum.
22	Feodar Protar Cabin	Feodar Protar Cabin	March 16, 1972 (#72000604)	SW of St. James, on Beaver Island; 45°42′13″N 85°33′48″W	St. James	Constructed by an Irish settler in about 1860, this log cabin was the home of Feodar (or Feodor) Protar from 1893 to 1925. Protar, a somewhat eccentric Russian emigre, was a self-taught and unlicensed physician, and served as Beaver Island's only doctor for many years.
23	Votruba Block	Votruba Block	July 3, 2008 (#08000585)	112 Main St. 45°09′16″N 85°07′39″W	East Jordan	Built in 1899, this building shares a wall with the adjoining East Jordan Lumber Company Store Building. Both buildings have been rehabilitated to form the Main Street Center office complex.
24	Wolverine Hotel	Wolverine Hotel	February 13, 1986 (#86000261)	300 Water St. 45°12′54″N 85°00′58″W	Boyne City	The Wolverine Hotel, also known as the Dilworth Hotel or the Wolverine-Dilworth Inn, was built in 1911/12. It is the only remaining hotel in the Boyne area dating from the turn-of-the-century era when Boyne City was a booming lumber town.
25	Wood Site		May 19, 1976 (#76001026)	Along Lake Michigan; 45°22′00″N 85°07′00″W	Hayes Township	The Wood Site was a seasonally occupied fishing camp used during the Late Woodland period.

== See also ==
- List of National Historic Landmarks in Michigan
- National Register of Historic Places listings in Michigan
- Listings in neighboring counties: Antrim, Cheboygan, Emmet, Leelanau, Mackinac, Otsego, Schoolcraft
- List of Michigan State Historic Sites in Charlevoix County, Michigan
