= List of Michigan State Historic Sites in Charlevoix County =

Location of Charlevoix County in Michigan

The following is a list of Michigan State Historic Sites in Charlevoix County, Michigan. Sites marked with a dagger (†) are also listed on the National Register of Historic Places in Charlevoix County, Michigan.

== Charlevoix County ==
Name	Image	Location	City	Listing date
Beaver Island Light Station†		South end of Beaver Island (East Side Drive, south tip of Beaver Island) Sec. 20, T37N, R10W	St. James	April 5, 1974
Belvedere Club	Belvedere Club	512 Belvedere Club	Charlevoix	November 14, 1974
Big Rock Point Nuclear Power Plant / Big Rock Point Informational Designation	Big Rock Point Nuclear Power Plant Big Rock Point Informational Designation	Lake Michigan Shores Roadside Park	Hayes Township	2007
Boyne City United Methodist Church	Boyne City United Methodist Church	324 South Park Street	Boyne City	August 21, 1987
Boyne City, Gaylord and Alpena Railroad Office Building	Boyne City Railroad Building	112 S. Park Street	Boyne City	January 27, 1983
Chicago and West Michigan Railroad Charlevoix Depot†		Chicago Avenue	Charlevoix	November 16, 1995
Chicago Club of Charlevoix	Chicago Club of Charlevoix	12 Chicago Club	Charlevoix	November 14, 1974
Clinton F. Woolsey Memorial Airport / Woolsey Family Farm	Woolsey Memorial Airport	513591 East Woolsey Lake Road	Leelanau Township	July 14, 2021
First Congregational Church of Charlevoix	First Congregational Church - Charlevoix	101 State Street	Charlevoix	April 20, 1995
Garden Island Indian Cemetery†	Garden Island Indian Cemetery	Garden Island	St. James Township	July 26, 1973
Horace S. Harsha House	Horace S. Harsha House	103 State Street	Charlevoix	August 23, 1990
Hemingway at Walloon Lake	Hemingway at Walloon Lake	Melrose Township Park	Walloon Lake	2010
Horton Bay Historic District	Horton Bay Historical District	Corner of Lake Street and Boyne City Road	Horton Bay	November 12, 1975
Ironton Ferry		Ferry Road	Ironton	June 18, 1976
Mormon Kingdom Informational Designation		City Dock Park, on US-31	Charlevoix	January 19, 1957
Mormon Print Shop†		North West corner of Forrest and Main streets on Beaver Island	St. James	February 19, 1958
Norwood School	Norwood School	742 4th Street	Norwood	2017
Norwood Township Hall	Norwood Township Hall	19759 Lake Street	Norwood	August 29, 1996
Pine River Indian Mission†	Greensky Hill Mission Church	NE of Charlevoix at junction of old US-31 and County Road 630	Charlevoix vicinity	November 17, 1962
John J. and Eva Reynier Porter Estate†	John Porter Estate	01787M-66 Highway	South Arm Township	December 5, 1996
Feodar Protar Cabin†		Slop Town Road and King's Highway (southwest of St. James, on Beaver Island) Sec. 5, T38N, R10W	St. James vicinity	October 29, 1971
Wolverine Hotel†	Wolverine Hotel	300 Water Street	Boyne City	December 19, 1984

== See also ==
- National Register of Historic Places listings in Charlevoix County, Michigan

== Sources ==
- Historic Sites Online – Charlevoix County. Michigan State Housing Developmental Authority. Accessed January 23, 2011.
