= Clinton Woolsey =

Clinton Woolsey may refer to:

- Clinton F. Woolsey, United States Army aviator and flying instructor
- Clinton N. Woolsey, American neuroscientist
