= Pine River Site =

Archaeological site in Michigan, United States

- U.S. National Register of Historic Places
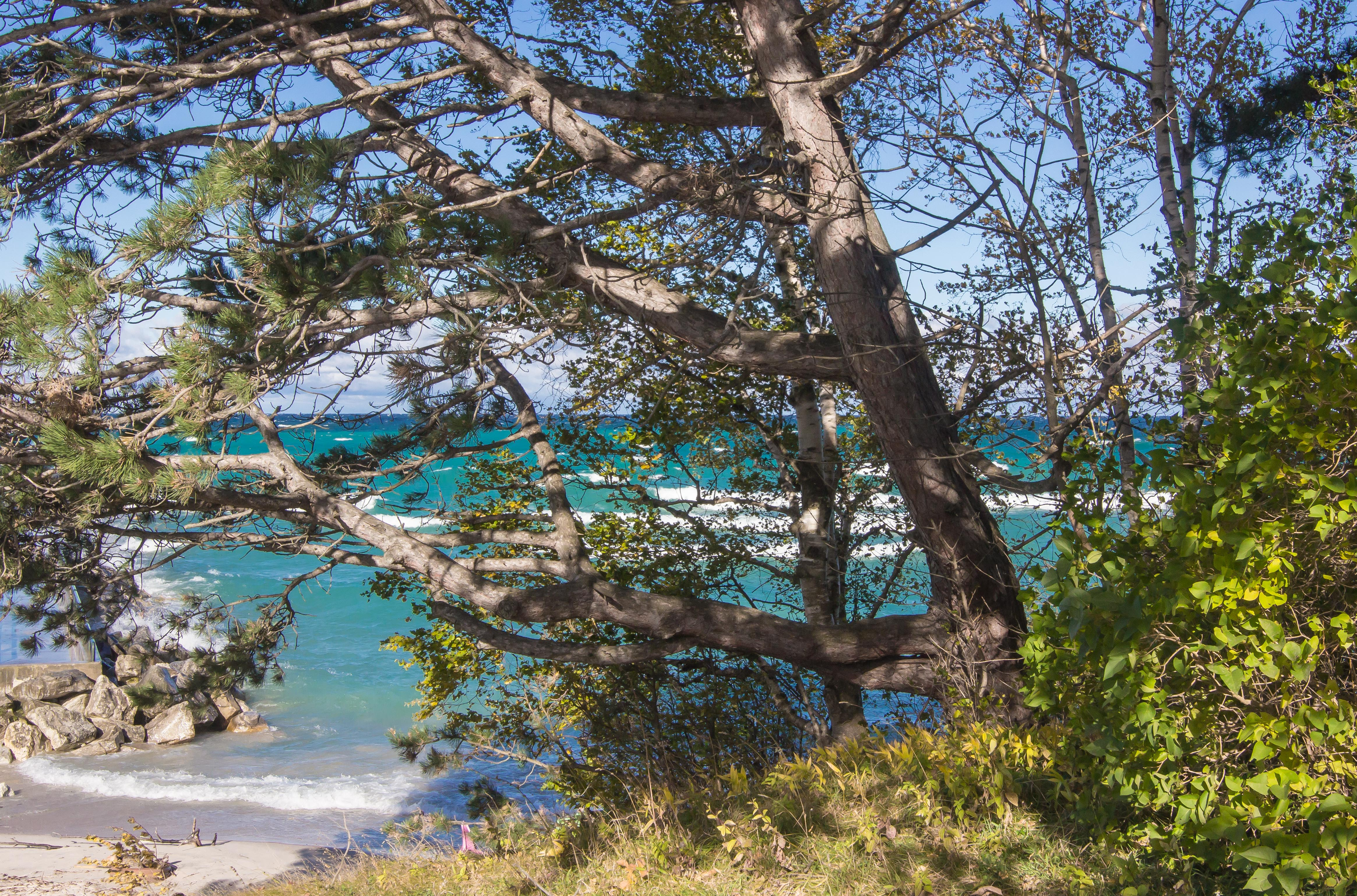

- Location within Michigan Location within the United States
- Location: Pine River channel, Charlevoix, Michigan
- Coordinates: 45°19′10″N 85°15′40″W
- Area: 1 acre (0.40 ha)
- NRHP reference No.: 72001472
- Added to NRHP: November 15, 1972

The Pine River Site, also designated 20CX19, is an archaeological site located in Charlevoix, Michigan. It was listed on the National Register of Historic Places in 1972.

This site is a multicomponent site, with evidence of occupation during the Archaic (c. 3000 BC), Middle Woodland (c. AD 100), and Late Woodland periods (c. AD 1400).

Chert from the Pewangoing Quarry was found at this site, along with partially finished tools, animal remains, and edible plants.

From 1899 to 1967, the old Beach Hotel in Charlevoix stood at this site. Although there had been reports of an archaeological site on the property, no work was done until 1970, after the hotel burned. New condominiums were constructed at the site in about 1972.
