= Detroit and Charlevoix Railroad =

Overview
- Headquarters: Deward, Michigan
- Locale: Frederic, Michigan to East Jordan, Michigan
- Dates of operation: 1901–1932
- Successor: Michigan Central

Technical
- Track gauge: 4 ft 8 1/2 in (1,435 mm) standard gauge
- Length: 42.66 miles

The Detroit and Charlevoix Railroad is a defunct railroad that was located in Northern Lower Michigan. It was created to haul finished lumber from timber lands to market. It was acquired by the Michigan Central Railroad.

== History ==
David Ward (died May 29, 1900), a land holder owning 70,000 acres of timber lands in the Northern Michigan counties of Otsego, Crawford, Antrim, Charlevoix, and Kalkaska, needed a way to economically access his timber holdings and ship the harvested timber to sawmills located in Bay City, Michigan. In 1893, Ward began construction of the Frederic & Charlevoix RR Co., a logging railroad interconnected at Frederic, Michigan with the Michigan Central Railroad Mackinac Division and extended 42.66 miles to East Jordan, Michigan, formerly known as South Arm on the shores of Lake Charlevoix, formerly known as Pine Lake. In 1897, the last three miles into East Jordan were removed for an unknown reason.

== Death of David Ward ==
On May 29, 1900, David Ward died, leaving his timberlands to his six children with the provision that for 12 years after his death, his son Willis C. Ward, his grandson Franklin B. Ward and his son-law George K. Root should have full authority to manage, harvest and control said timberland, with profits being divided equally among his surviving six children. After 12 years, the entire estate would be divided equally between the surviving six children. This created a huge incentive for the Ward executors to conduct a massive clearcutting of the timberlands to monetize the timber holdings, since dividing the 70,000 acres equitably between the six children would be difficult.

== Establishment of Detroit & Charlevoix Railroad ==
The estate executors determined that shipping 70,000 acres of harvested timber to Bay City was not efficient. The most efficient method would be to build a modern sawmill close to the timber and upgrade the logging railroad to accommodate Class I railroad rolling stock so the finished lumber could be shipped to the large markets like Chicago. On January 1, 1901, the estate executors, David Ward's son Willis C. Ward (President), grandson Franklin B. Ward and son-in-law George K. Root (Secretary), organized a corporation, under the general railroad laws of the State of Michigan, named the Detroit & Charlevoix Railroad Company, with an authorized capital stock of $525,000 to which all equipment and right-of-way property of David Ward's Frederic & Charlevoix RR Co. were transferred. At this time, the road had three steam locomotives equipped with air brakes, 25 Russel Logging Cars and 29 platform cars rated to 60,000 lbs with air brakes, two snow plows and two passenger cars. The executors planned to improve the line to accommodate interstate railcars, rebuild the line into East Jordan, Michigan, and extend the line to Charlevoix, Michigan, 13 miles to the northwest. In winter 1901, the executors began the construction of a 600-horsepower, steam-driven, double-band sawmill plant at the site called Deward (an acronym formed from D.E. Ward) near the headwaters of the Manistee River 11 miles from Frederic, on the line of the logging railroad, and about 30 miles from East Jordan. This sawmill had an annual capacity of 20 million board feet. In addition to the sawmill, a railroad switch yard, mill pond, tramways, boarding houses, machine shops, barns, offices, school, general store, railroad station and houses were constructed. The buildings were constructed of milled lumber and tarpaper. In October 1908, a devastating forest fire, exacerbated by poor lumbering methods, destroyed much of the remaining timber. By 1912, all 70,000 acres of the Ward estate had been clearcut and there was no more timber for the sawmill. The sawmill was dismantled and sold. The town of Deward began its return to nature.

== Michigan Central Railroad ==
On May 1, 1907, the Michigan Central Railroad purchased all the capital stock of the Detroit & Charlevoix Railroad. On September 27, 1912, The Detroit & Charlevoix Railroad was merged into the Michigan Central. They valued the cost of acquisition at $518,735.86 and showed an operating loss of $5,428.91 for 1916. The Detroit & Charlevoix Railroad name was dropped and the line was known as the East Jordan Branch. In 1930, the Michigan Central Railroad had stopped operating the East Jordan Branch and in 1933, the line was abandoned.
