= Charlevoix Central Historic District =

- U.S. National Register of Historic Places
- U.S. Historic district
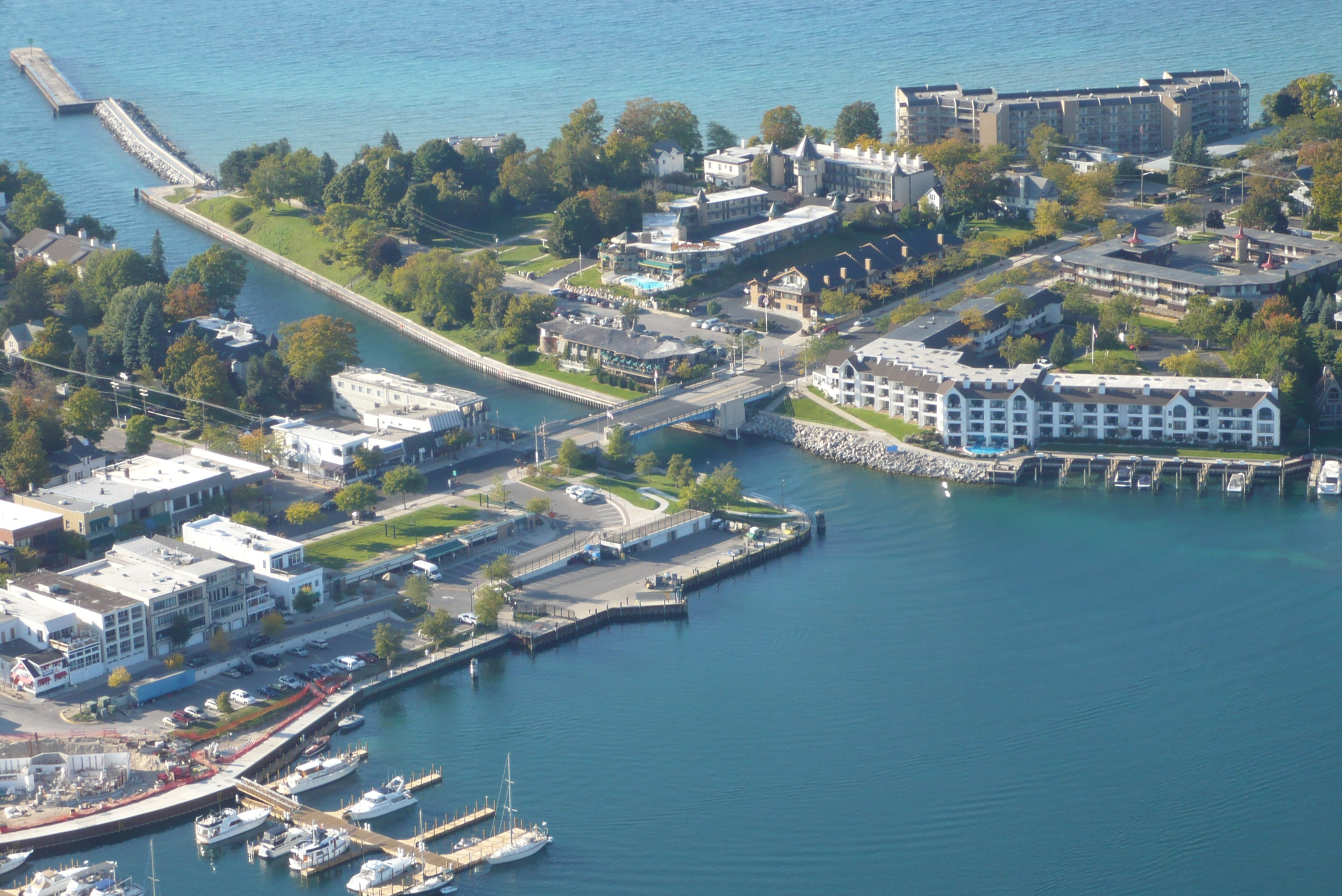
- Aerial view of the historic district
- Interactive map
- Location: Roughly bounded by State St, East Dixon Ave, Antrim St, and Round Lake; Charlevoix, Michigan
- Coordinates: 45°19′2″N 85°15′31″W
- Built: 1865
- Architect: Earl Young, Jack Begrow, J.T. Kirkpatrick, F. L. Bartholomew
- Architectural style: Gothic Revival, Italianate, Colonial Revival, Classical Revival, Vernacular
- NRHP reference No.: 100011634
- Added to NRHP: April 9, 2025

The Charlevoix Central Historic District is a primarily commercial historic district located along Bridge and State Streets in Charlevoix, Michigan. The district is roughly bounded by State Street to the west, East Dixon Avenue to the north, Antrim Street to the south, and the western boundary of Round Lake to the east. It was listed on the National Register of Historic Places in 2025.

== History ==
In 1869, the channel between Lake Michigan and Lake Charlevoix was opened up to improve shipping. This led to an influx of population, and an increase in houses and businesses. The commercial section of the city developed along Bridge Street, named for the 1878 swing bridge installed over the shipping channel. Shipping infrastructure developed along the nearby Round Lake waterfront. Over the next decade, the community continued to grow, and tourism became an important part of the local economy as hotels and summer resorts were constructed in the area. By 1890, Bridge Street was built up with one- and two-story structures housing stores catering to both the local population and tourists. Near the end of the century, the city focused on improvements to the street and sidewalks in the district. In 1901, a new bridge was installed to improve both surface traffic flow and provide more room for shipping.

After the turn of the century, a number of new buildings was constructed on Bridge Street, replacing earlier structures. Additional commercial buildings were constructed on side streets near Bridge Street. More tourists flocked to the city in the next decades, as automobile travel became more common. As the logging industry dwindled, the shipping infrastructure along Round Lake because less utilized, and the city began considering reconstructing the waterfront into a public park. However, it was not until the 1930s that the park was implemented, with substantial support from the Works Progress Administration.

Although the lakefront park was installed in the 1930s, little else was done in the district due to the economic effects of the Great Depression and World War II. Finally, in the late 1940s a new bridge was constructed. Soon after, new hotels were constructed north of the shipping channel. Additional renovations along Bridge Street occurred through the end of the century.

== Description ==
The Charlevoix Central Historic District consists of 82 structures, of which 47 contribute to the historic character of the district. These structures are primarily located along the two main north–south streets: Bridge and State. The section of Bridge Street within the district generally features commercial structures with consistent setbacks on both sides of the street. State Street features city public buildings and several churches. Construction dates for buildings in the district range from the 1860s to the present, and a range of architectural styles are represented.

Significant buildings and structures in the district include:

- Memorial Bridge (Bridge Street at Lower Pine River Channel): Constructed in 1949, Memorial Bridge is a double-leaf bascule bridge.
- Van Pelt Building (217 Bridge Street): Constructed in 1909, the Van Pelt Building is a two-story building, three bay wide, constructed of yellow brick and terra cotta.
- Charlevoix Masonic Temple (401 Bridge Street): Constructed in 1913 from a design by Frank Glassford, the Charlevoix Masonic Temple is a two-story building with a flat roof.
- Weathervane Inn Restaurant (106 Pine River Lane): Constructed in 1954 from a design by Earl Young, the Weathervane Inn Restaurant is a two-story building clad in fieldstone with an undulating roof.
- Weathervane Terrace Inn (111 Pine River Lane): Constructed in 1965 from a design by Earl Young, the Weathervane Terrace Inn is a two-story motel constructed in a U-shape.
- Philo Beers House (103 Park Avenue): Constructed in about 1865, this was originally built as a home for Philo Beers as a 1-1/2 story upright and wing structure.
