= Charlevoix station (Michigan) =

- Chicago and West Michigan Railroad Charlevoix Station
- U.S. National Register of Historic Places
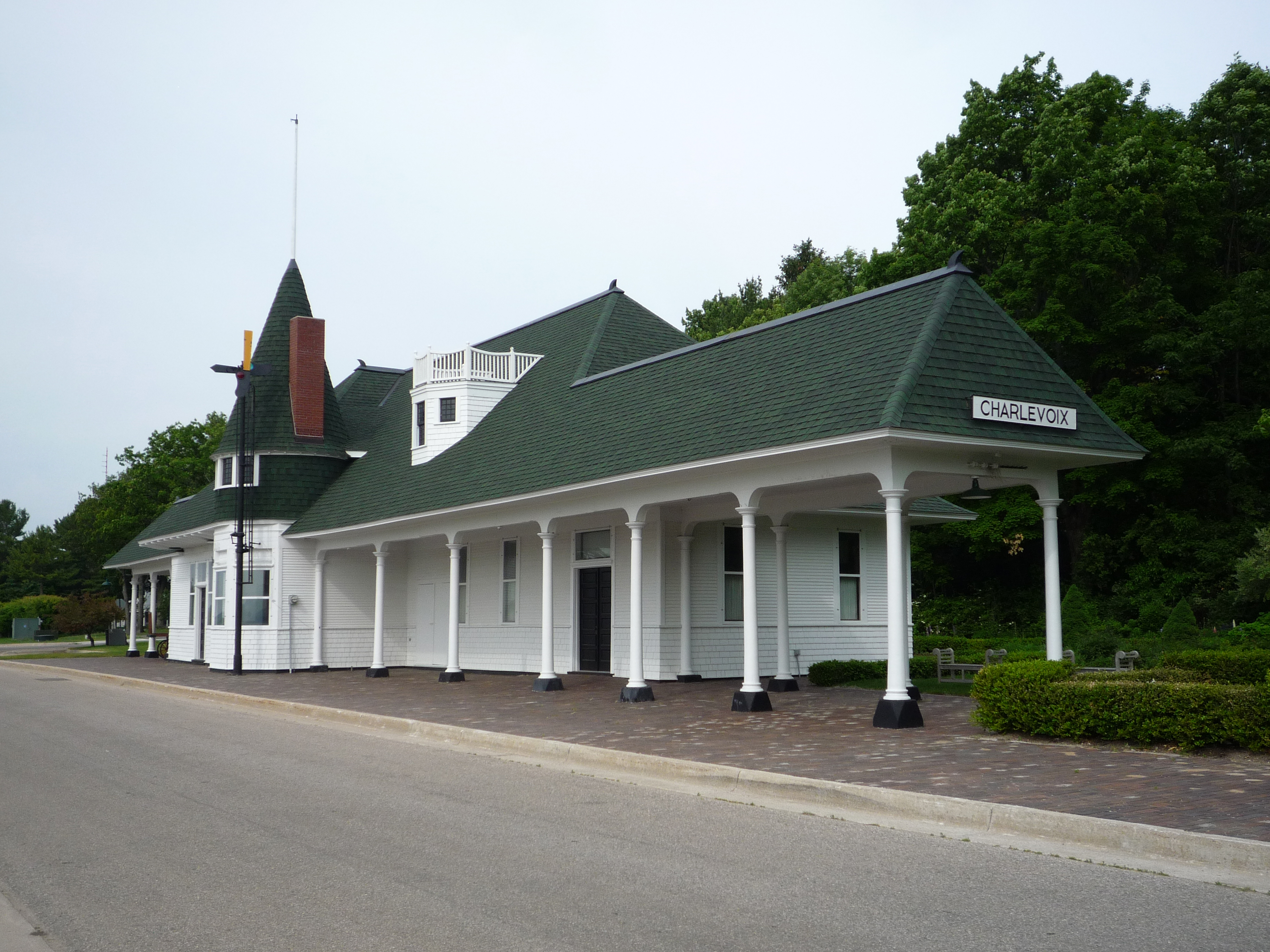

- Location within Michigan Location within the United States
- Interactive map
- Location: Chicago Ave., Charlevoix, Michigan
- Coordinates: 45°19′3″N 85°14′35″W
- Area: less than one acre
- Built: 1892
- Built by: Pelton & Company
- Architectural style: Shingle Style
- NRHP reference No.: 95001393
- Added to NRHP: November 29, 1995

The Chicago and West Michigan Railroad Charlevoix Station is a railroad depot located on Chicago Avenue in Charlevoix, Michigan. It was listed in the National Register of Historic Places in 1995.

== History ==
The area around Charlevoix became a popular summer resort starting in the late 1870s with the establishment of Bay View in 1877, the Charlevoix Summer Resort (now the Belvedere Club) in 1878, and the Chicago Summer Resort (now the Chicago Club) in 1880. In response to the increase in traffic, in the early 1890s the Chicago and West Michigan Railroad extended its line from Traverse City north to Petoskey. In 1891 the railroad located two sites for planned depots in Charlevoix: this one on the north side of town near the Chicago Resort, and a second one (now demolished) on the south side of town near the Charlevoix Resort.

In 1892, the railroad contracted with the Grand Rapids firm of Pelton & Company to construct this depot. Work began in May and was completed by July, with the first trains running into Charlevoix in June. In 1900, the Chicago and West Michigan Railroad merged with two other railroads to create the Pere Marquette Railroad. The railroad promoted Charlevoix and other northern Michigan towns as summer destinations, and ran an increased number of trains into Charlevoix. In addition, an interurban two-car train ran between the north and south Charlevoix stations up to seven times daily.

The high level of service to Charlevoix continued through World War II. However, the increase in automobile use in the late 1940s and 1950s cut into railroad revenues. The Pere Marquette merged into the Chesapeake and Ohio Railway in 1947, and service to Charlevoix was gradually scaled back. Passenger train service to Charlevoix was completely discontinued in 1962. Rail freight runs continued until 1982, and the Chesapeake and Ohio Railway abandoned all its lines in northern Michigan.

In the 1980s, the Charlevoix Yacht Club occupied the building. In 1992, Mr. & Mrs. Robert Pew donated the Charlevoix Railroad Station to the Charlevoix Historical Society. The Depot building was restored by the society, and is now a venue for Historical Society events and programs, and is available for rental.

== Description ==
The Chicago and West Michigan Railroad Charlevoix Station is a single-story rectangular, Shingle Style building with a hip roof. Covered platforms extend from the main mass at each end, giving the station a broad and low form. The exterior is clad with shingles below the window sill level and clapboards above. The building sits on a fieldstone foundation, with a poured concrete basement floor. A large bay window and a conical-roof round tower rise above the roofline on what was the track side. The street side has a low arched entrance with a massive gable above containing a balcony-fronted, tripartite, transomed window. A hip roof canopy supported by round columns covers the platforms at each end, and runs across part of the main building facade.

The interior contains outer and inner lobbies, a ticket/telegraph office, a waiting room, two lavatories, and a large freight and baggage room. The interior is entirely finished with hardwoods. The walls are covered with vertical beaded-board dados up to chair-rail height, horizontal boarding above that, up to picture-moulding height, and additional vertical boarding up to the ceilings. The ceiling is covered with boards, and the floor has original hardwood floorboards. The waiting room contains an original fireplace with mantelpiece. Columns similar to those supporting the platform canopies frame the opening between the main lobby and the waiting room.

Preceding station	Chesapeake and Ohio Railway	Following station
Belvedere toward Grand Rapids	Grand Rapids – Bay View	Bayshore toward Bay View
