= Pi-wan-go-ning Prehistoric District =

Archaeological site in Michigan, United States

- U.S. National Register of Historic Places
- U.S. Historic district
- Location within Michigan Location within the United States
- Location: Along Lake Michigan, north of Norwood, Michigan
- Coordinates: 45°15′10″N 85°22′45″W
- Area: 670 acres (270 ha)
- NRHP reference No.: 73002153
- Added to NRHP: October 3, 1973

The Pi-wan-go-ning Prehistoric District is a collection of three archaeological sites located along Lake Michigan just north of Norwood, Michigan. The three sites are the Pewangoing Quarry (designated 20CX20); Whiskey Creek (designated 20CX22); and Fritz Trail (designated 20CX21). The district was listed on the National Register of Historic Places in 1973.

The sites in the district include several places where flint was quarried. They are all located along the shore of Lake Michigan, with the Pewangoning Quarry furthest south, Whiskey Creek slightly north, and Fritz Trail about a kilometer further.
