= O'Neill Site =

Archaeological site in Michigan, United States

- U.S. National Register of Historic Places
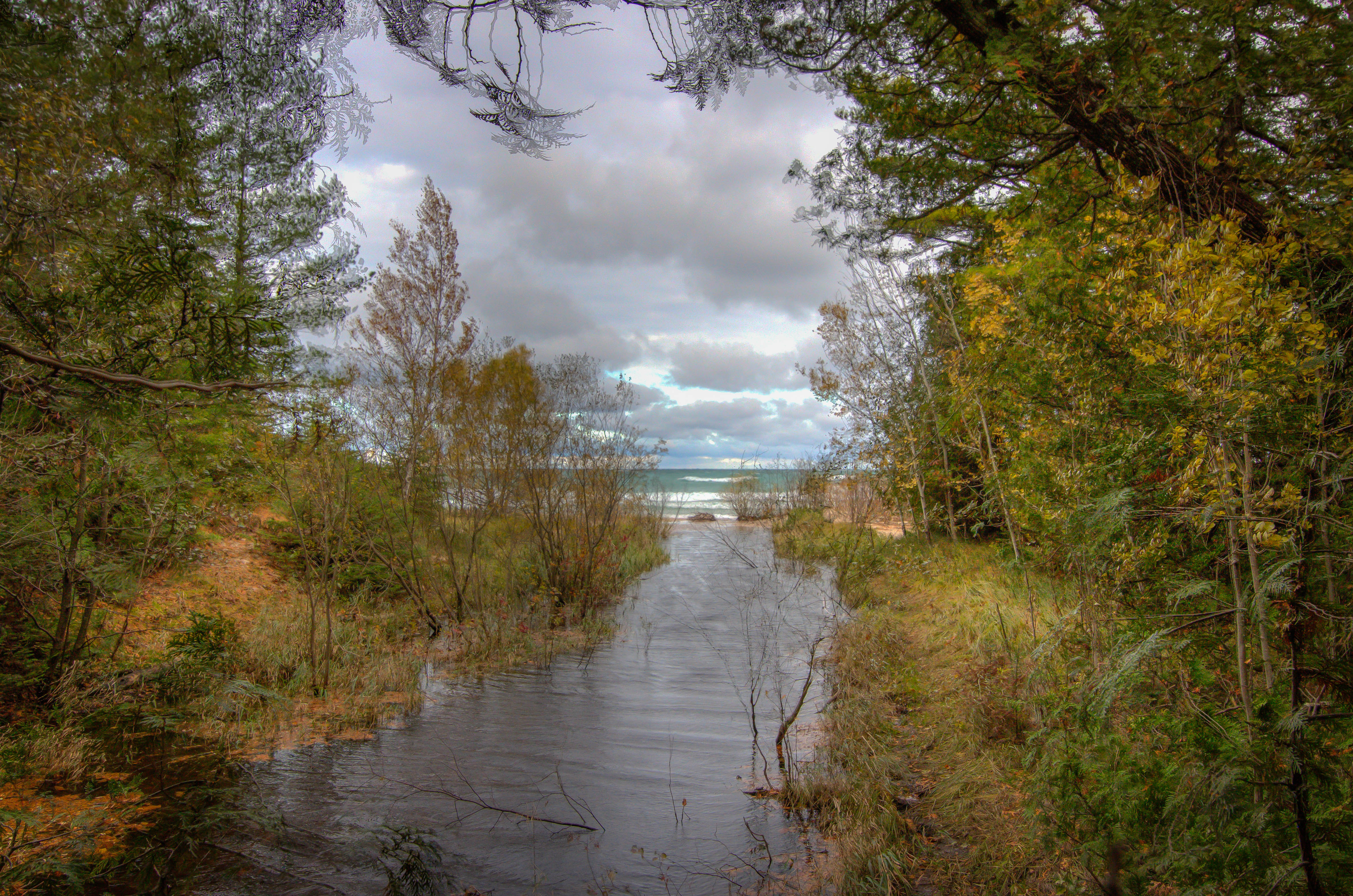

- Location within Michigan Location within the United States
- Location: 5 km south of Charlevoix, Michigan
- Coordinates: 45°17′10″N 85°20′40″W
- Area: 5 acres (2.0 ha)
- NRHP reference No.: 71001019
- Added to NRHP: May 27, 1971

The O'Neill Site, also designated 20CX18, is an archaeological site located about 5 km south Charlevoix, Michigan. It was listed on the National Register of Historic Places in 1971.

It is a partially stratified Late Woodland period site, located near the mouth of Inwood Creek. Occupation of the site spanned approximately AD 1000 - 1455. Numerous stone tools, pottery, and house remains were found at the site.
