= East Jordan Lumber Company Store Building =

- U.S. National Register of Historic Places
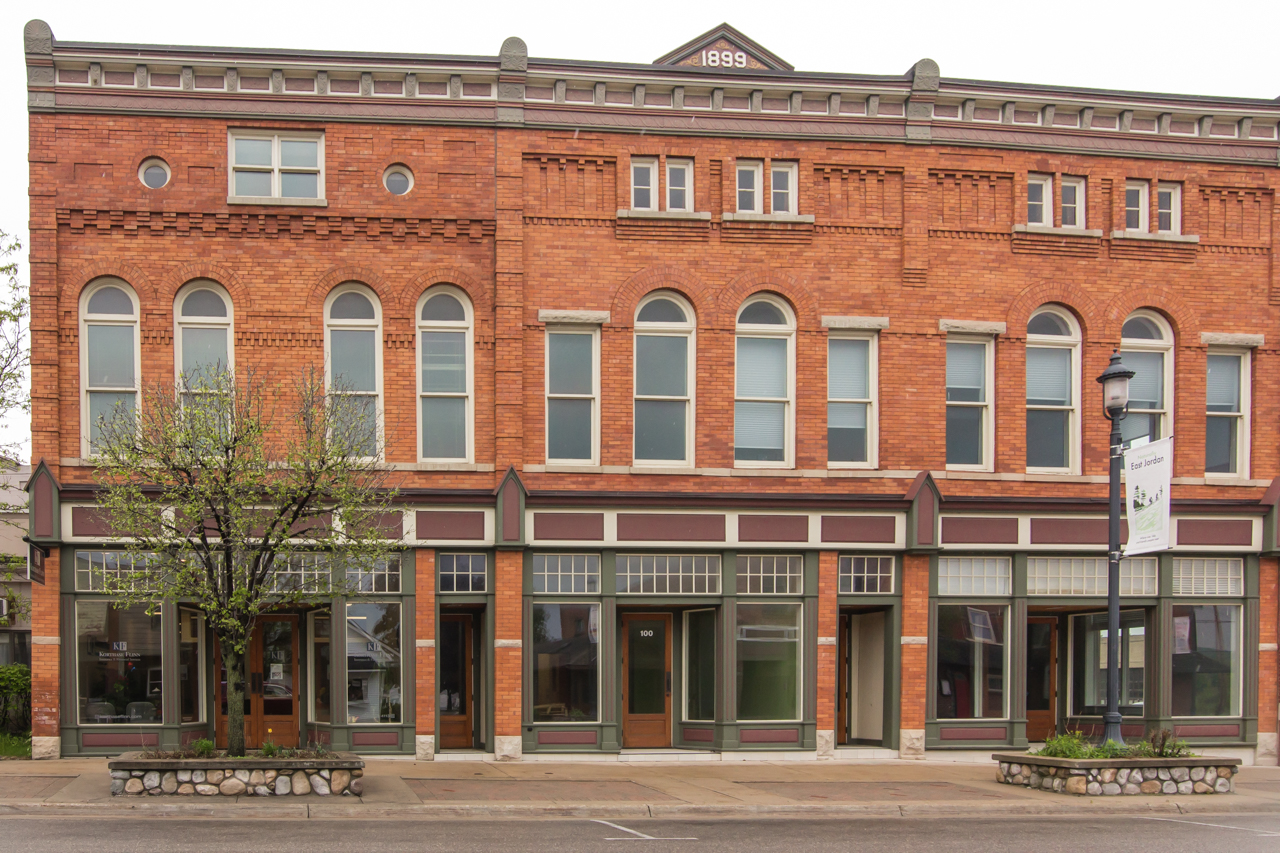
- East Jordan Lumber Company (right two storefronts) next to the Votruba Block (left storefront)

- Location within Michigan Location within the United States
- Interactive map
- Location: 104 Main St, East Jordan, Michigan
- Coordinates: 45°9′16″N 85°7′39″W
- Area: less than one acre
- Built: 1899
- Architectural style: Late Victorian
- NRHP reference No.: 08000586
- Added to NRHP: July 3, 2008

The East Jordan Lumber Company Store Building is a commercial building located at 104 Main Street in East Jordan, Michigan. It was listed in the National Register of Historic Places in 2008. It is next to, and shares a wall with, the Votruba Block; both buildings have been rehabilitated to form the Main Street Center office complex.

== History ==
East Jordan was originally settled in the late 1870s. In 1879, Joseph Glenn moved a sawmill to the East Jordan. At approximately the same time, he built a one-story frame general store at this site, which sold a broad range of items including groceries, hardware, housewares, and clothing. Soon after his nephew, William P. Porter, purchased a half-interest in the business, which took the name of Glenn & Porter. In 1888, Glenn sold his interest in the mill, and the company changed its name to the East Jordan Lumber Company.

In about 1899, the company moved the original wooden store to State Street, and began construction on the current building, likely at the same time the adjoining Vortruba Block was constructed. The new building housed the East Jordan Lumber Company general store, which took up both first-floor storefronts, and the company offices, which were housed on the second floor. Porter, and later his sons, had offices in the building. Other portions of the second floor were occupied by a Masonic Lodge, and various professional offices, including doctors and dentists.

The East Jordan Lumber Company mills closed in the 1920s, but by that time Porter had established the East Jordan Canning Company, which used and promoted the agricultural crops of the region. The general store discontinued sales of clothing and dry goods in the 1920s, concentrating on hardware and groceries. It continued in business until 1938, when the grocery section was sold to Mr. and Mrs E.H. Clark, who had been operating the store since the late 1920s. In 1939, the hardware section of the store was sold to William A. Porter, one of William P. Porter's sons.

The grocery store operated until the 1950s, under the name Quality Food Market and later the Maxwell Market. It was succeeded by a five-and-dime store. The hardware store operated into the 1950s as Porter Hardware, and later as Olson Hardware. The second floor continued to house professional offices into the 1960s. From 1942 to 1954, J[errian] Van Dellen, M.D., had his office in the SE part of the second floor, 25 steps up for patients. In the 1970s the building was occupied by Snizbee's Five and Dime. By the 1990s, it was vacant.

In 2002-2004, it was rehabilitated as part of the Main Street Center office building project.

== Description ==
The East Jordan Lumber Company Store Building is a two-story brick Late Victorian structure, and measuring 46 feet across and 100 feet in depth. It is constructed of red brick, with wood framing and an iron cornice. The front is divided into two storefronts, each containing a central ground floor entry. An entry staircase to the second story is between the storefronts. The second story facade contains four double-hung windows above each storefront, with the center two in round arches. The attic level contains pairs of small double-hung windows above the round-arched ones, flanked with a vertical brickwork treatment. Decorative brickwork and a pressed metal cornice top the structure. The street-level storefront has been reconstructed to be compatible with the Victorian elements of the building.

The interior originally contained a large open space on the first floor, and a long hallway on the second floor opening onto offices on either side. During rehabilitation, both stories were converted into office suites.
