= Mt. McSauba Site =

Archaeological site in Michigan, United States

- U.S. National Register of Historic Places
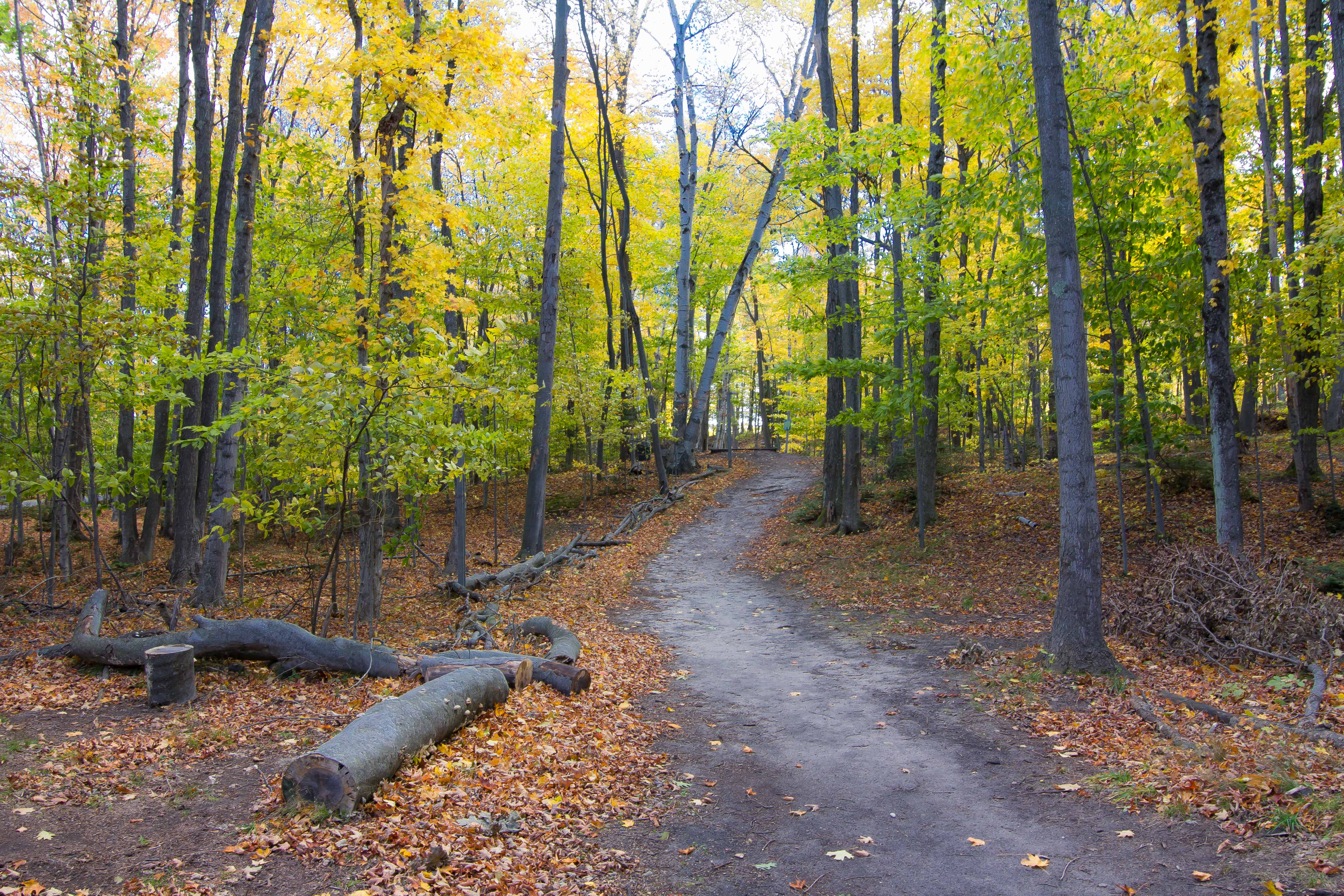

- Location within Michigan Location within the United States
- Location: Near Mt. McSauba, north of Charlevoix, Michigan
- Coordinates: 45°20′10.018″N 85°14′49.754″W
- Area: 5 acres (2.0 ha)
- NRHP reference No.: 76001025
- Added to NRHP: September 29, 1976

The Mt. McSauba Site, also designated 20CX23, is an archaeological site located near Charlevoix, Michigan. It was listed on the National Register of Historic Places in 1976. The site is an encampment on a dune.

== Gallery ==
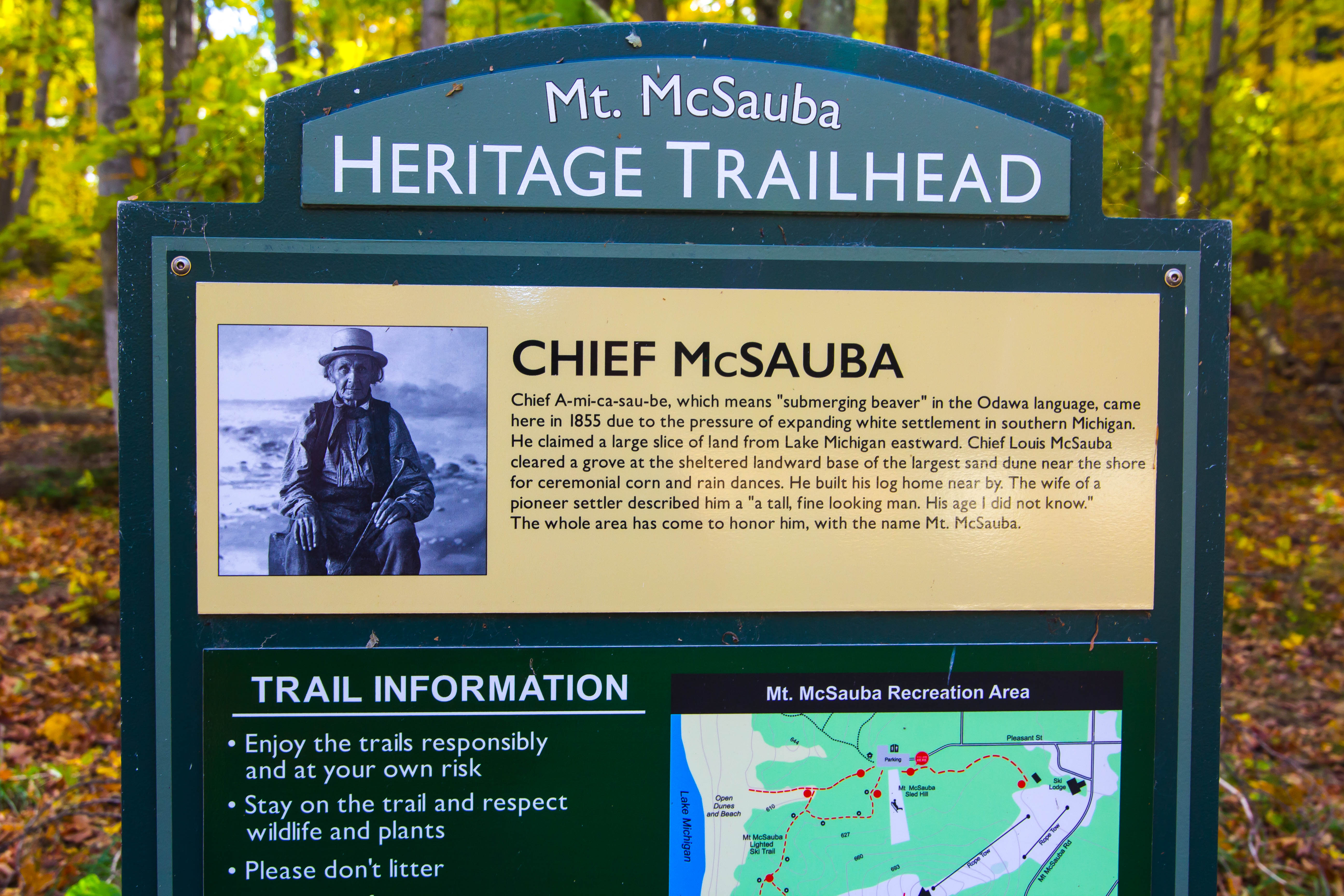
Description of Chief McSauba

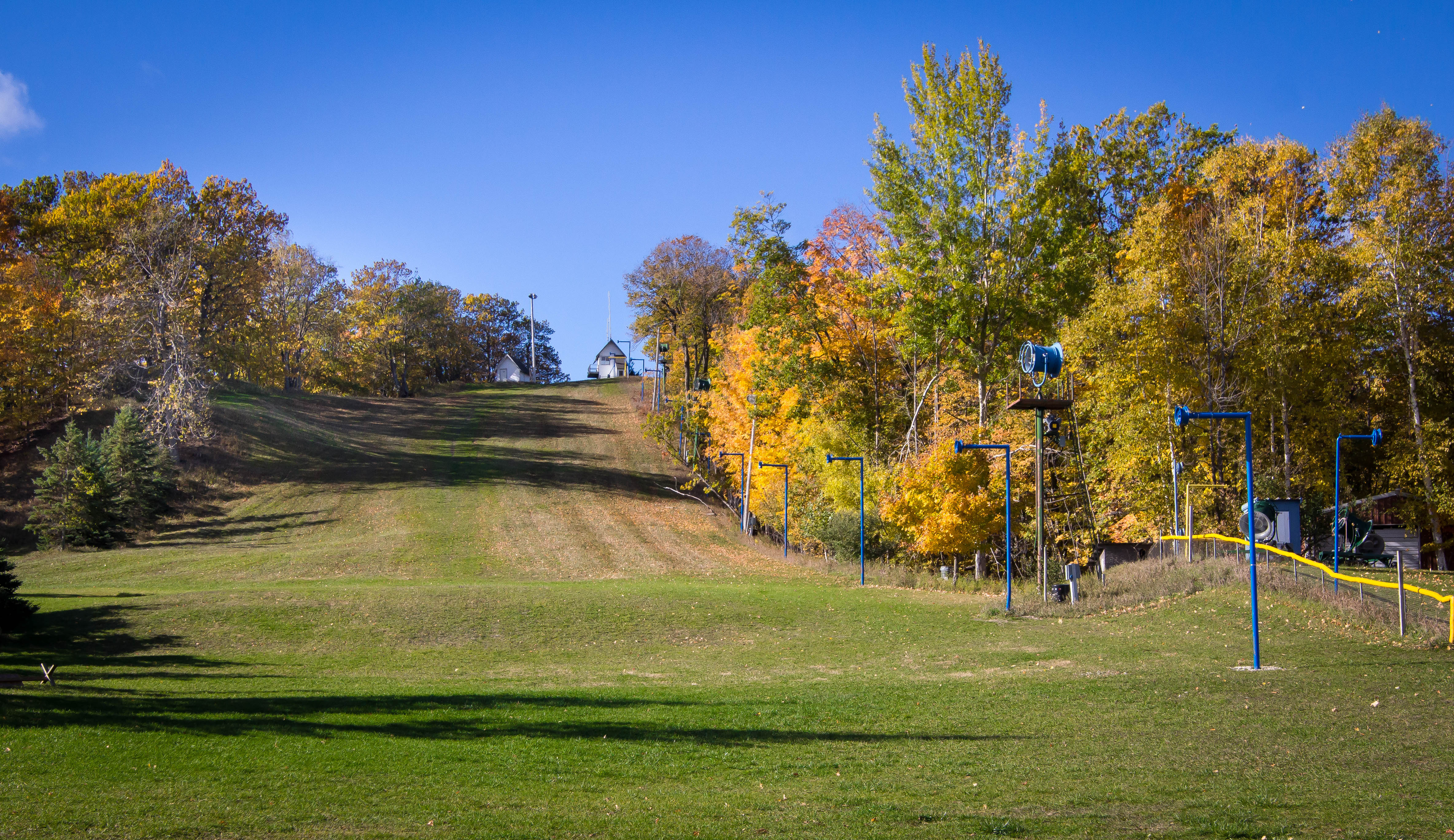
Ski Area on Mt. McSauba
