= John J. and Eva Reynier Porter Estate =

- U.S. National Register of Historic Places
- U.S. Historic district
- Michigan State Historic Site
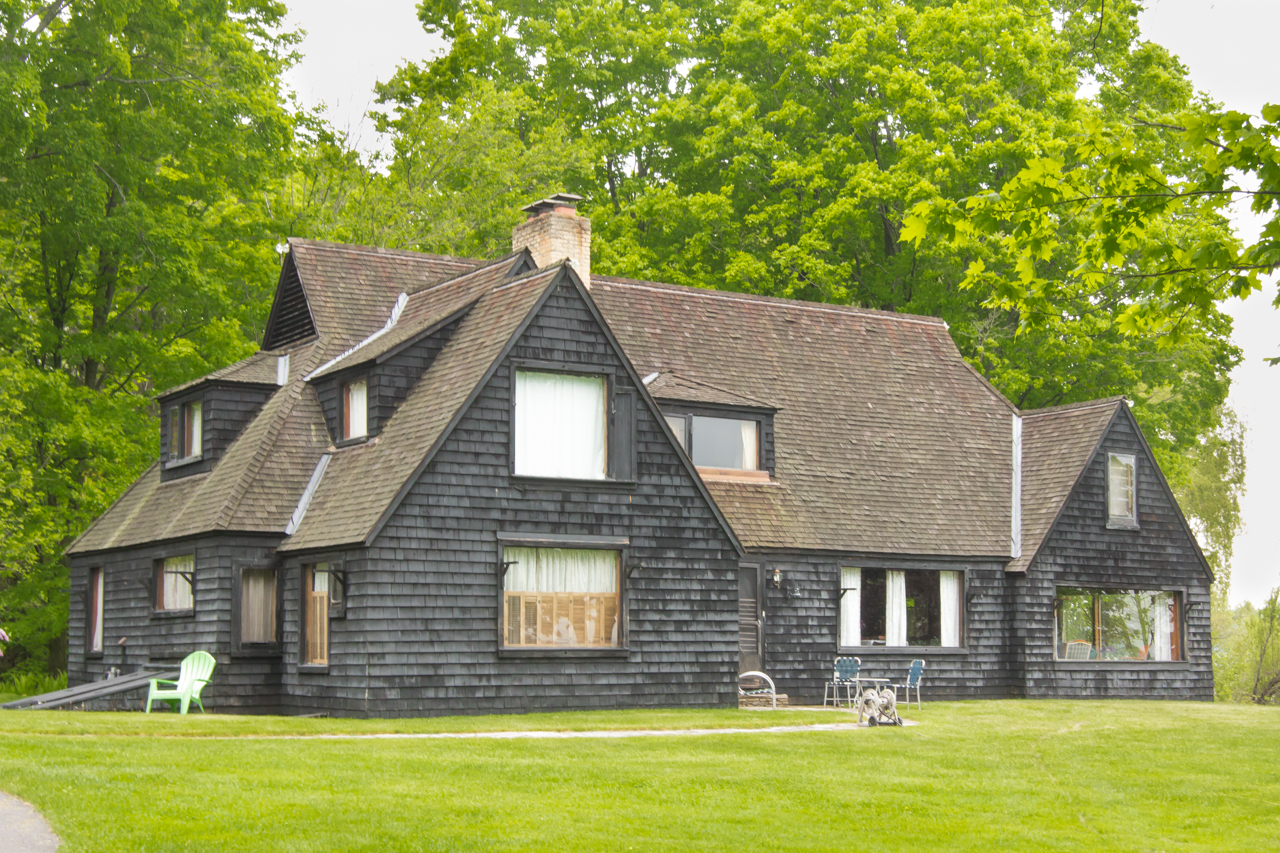

- Location within Michigan Location within the United States
- Interactive map
- Location: 01787 M-66 S, South Arm Township, Michigan
- Coordinates: 45°10′44″N 85°9′45″W
- Area: 7 acres (2.8 ha)
- Built: 1926
- Architect: J. Alexander McColl
- Architectural style: Colonial Revival
- NRHP reference No.: 98000269
- Added to NRHP: August 3, 1998

The John J. and Eva Reynier Porter Estate, also known as Elm Pointe, is a house, with associated outbuildings, located at 01787 M-66 South in South Arm Township, Michigan. It was listed on the National Register of Historic Places in 1998. The estate is now a public park, and houses the East Jordan Portside Art and Historical Society Museum.

== History ==
William P. Porter arrived in East Jordan, Michigan in 1879 to establish a sawmill. The company he founded, the East Jordan Lumber Company, eventually owned two sawmills, a shingle mill, and a maple flooring plant, and extensive timberland. William's son John J. Porter was born in 1885. He attended Oberlin College and the University of Michigan, after which he returned to the area and took over the East Jordan Lumber Company sales force. As the area's timber was depleted in the 1920s, the Porters envisioned a conversion to agriculture, and to that end helped establish the East Jordan Canning Company in 1927. By 1931 John Porter was president of the firm.

In 1925, the East Jordan Lumber Company conveyed the title to Elm Pointe, where this estate now stands, to John and Eva Reynier Porter. The Porters soon had this estate constructed on the property. The Porters hired Grand Rapids architect J. Alexander McColl to design the estate. The house presumably used East Jordan Lumber Company materials, and may have been designed in part to showcase the company's products.

The Porters sold the estate to Robert W. and Augustine Allen in 1942. The Allens used the house as their summer home, and constructed a large garage/lodge on the property. After Robert's death, Augustine married George Westgate. In 1972, the Westgates donated the property to the city of East Jordan, with the understanding that it would be used for public purposes. The city installed picnic tables and cooking grills on the property, and in 1976 leased the lodge to the Portside Art and Historical Society, who opened a history museum there. The house can be rented for weddings and other events.

== Description ==
The Porter Estate covers about seven acres of gently sloping ground on Lake Charlevoix. A small creek divides the property in half. South of the creek is an open lawn area with a circular drive. Along the drive are the main house, a large garage/lodge, and a smaller garage.

The house on the Porter Estate is a one-and-one-half-story Colonial Revival structure with a complex set of gable and hip roofs, The building is clad with wood shingles. The broad front has a projecting gabled section at either end, one projecting much further than the other. The main roof rises above these gables, and contains shed dormers on the side roofs. Broad plate glass windows, original to the house, illuminate the interior. The inside has wooden paneling and beamed ceilings. The attic of the house contains a large open room known as "the dormitory" that provided overnight space guests. The house still contains the intact furnishings.

The smaller garage is a two-bay structure, with a shingled finish much like the house. The larger garage/lodge structure is a two-bay utilitarian, front-gable building constructed of concrete block and clad with wooden shingles.
