= Woolsey Memorial Airport =

Public use airport in Northport, Michigan, US

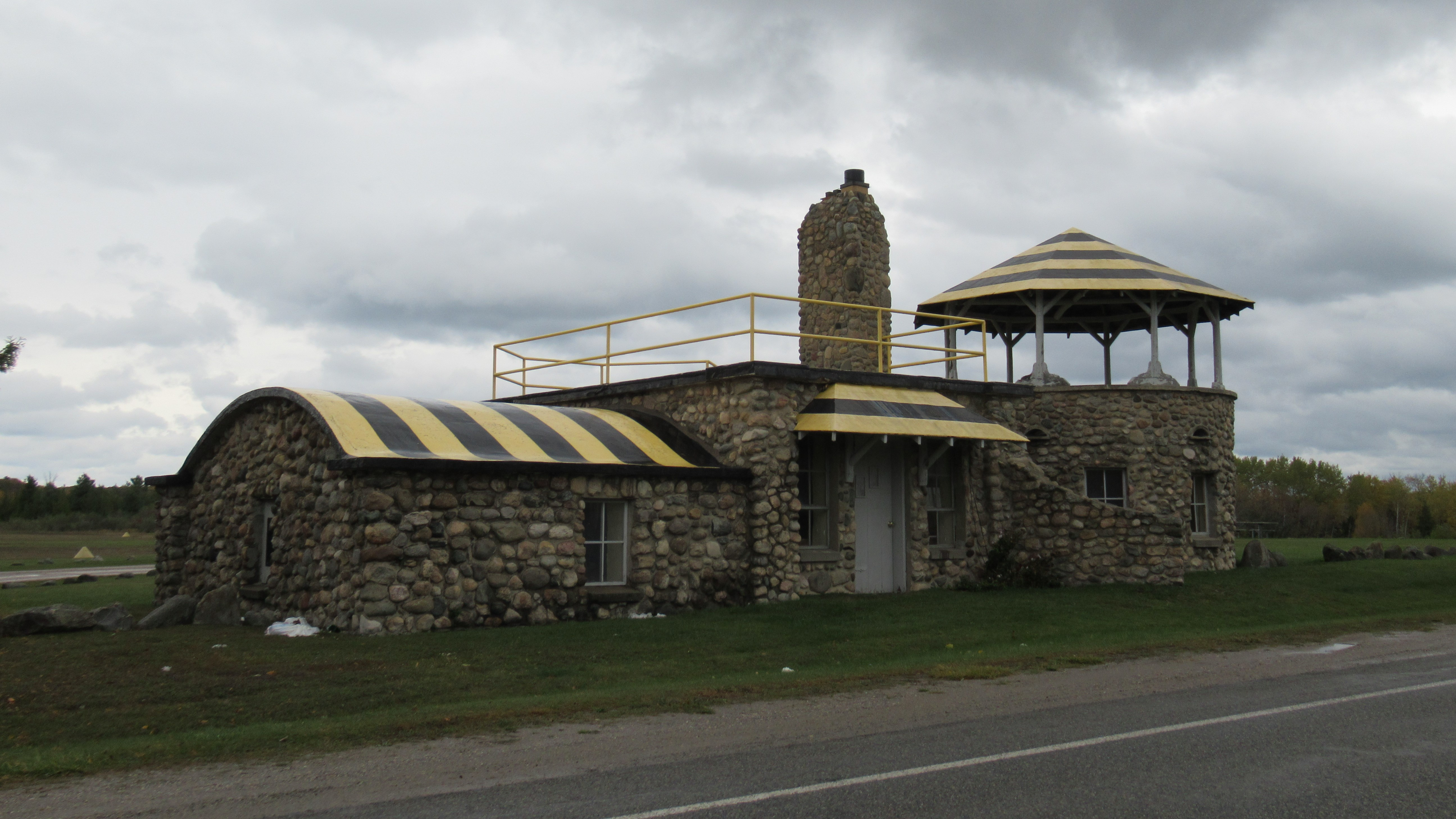
- Single terminal building along County Hwy 629
- IATA: none; ICAO: none; FAA LID: 5D5

Summary
- Airport type: Public
- Owner/Operator: Leelanau Township
- Serves: Northport, Michigan
- Location: Leelanau Peninsula
- Built: 1935
- Time zone: UTC−05:00 (-5)
  - Summer (DST): UTC−04:00 (-4)
- Elevation AMSL: 628 ft (191 m)
- Coordinates: 45°09′47″N 085°34′17″W
- Interactive map of Woolsey Memorial Airport

Runways
Direction	Length		Surface
Direction	ft	m	Surface
9/27	3,663	1,116	Turf
16/34	2,670	814	Turf

Statistics (2015)
- Aircraft movements: 504

Woolsey Family Farm / Clinton F. Woolsey Memorial Airport
- Location within the state of Michigan
- 45°09′45″N 85°34′15″W
- Location: 13591 E. Woolsey Lake Rd. Leelanau Township, Michigan

Michigan State Historic Site
- Designated: July 14, 2021

Woolsey Memorial Airport (FAA LID: 5D5) is a publicly owned, public use airport located 3 miles northeast of Northport, Michigan, United States, on the Leelanau Peninsula.

== History ==
The airport opened in 1935 in honor of Clinton Woolsey, an engineer for the U.S. Army Air Service who died near Buenos Aires, Argentina, in 1927 during the first Pan-American Goodwill Flight across Central and South America. Land for the airport was donated by Woolsey's father, and additional land was added by the township.

The airport was converted from a farm by the Works Progress Administration during the Great Depression as part of a "New Deal" public works project.

The airport was registered as a historic site in 2021, and a marker stands to commemorate its history. The airport took three years to be approved as a site.

== Facilities and aircraft ==
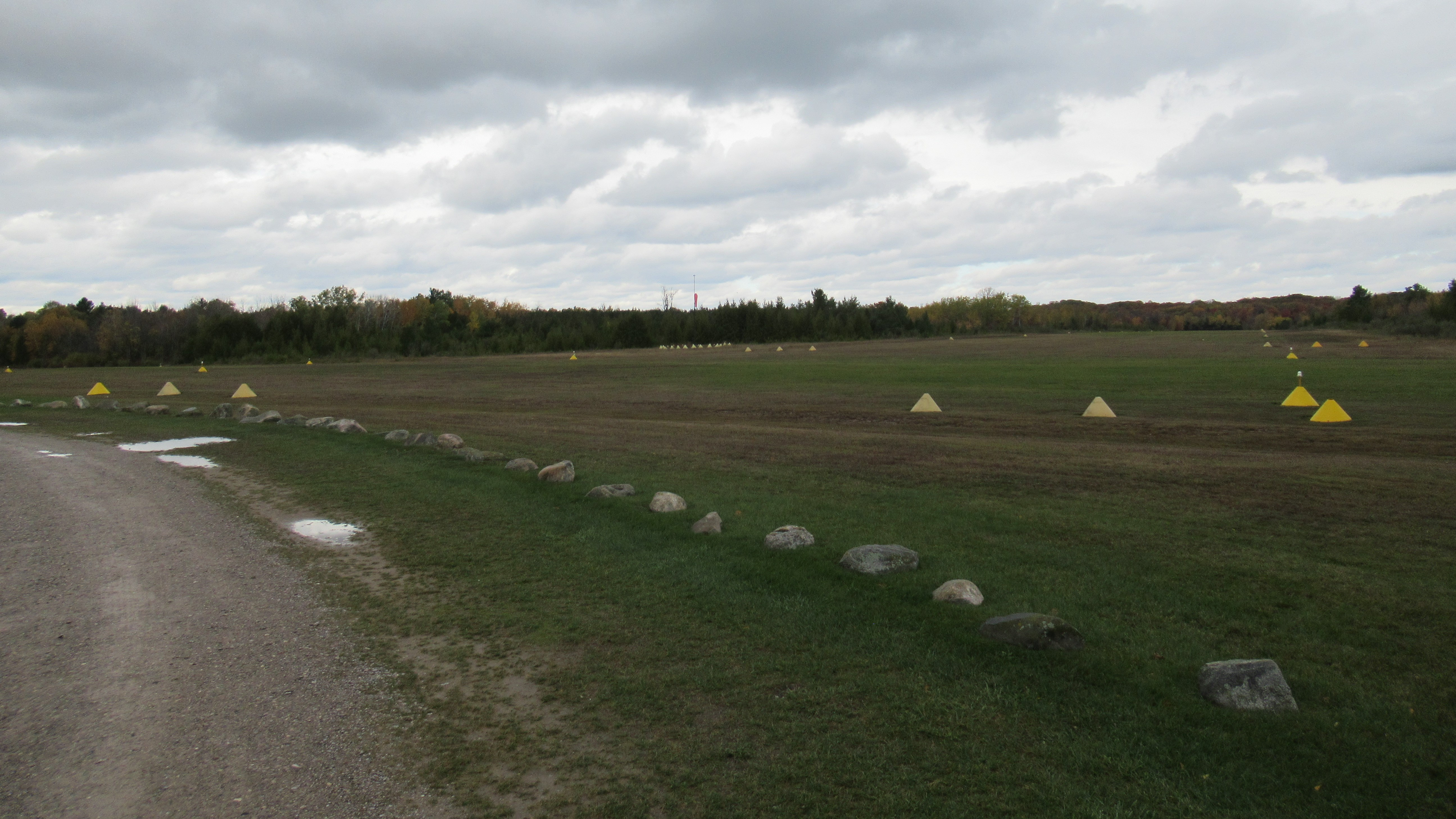
Looking northwest at the dual runways

The airport has two runways, both made of turf. Runway 9/27 measures 3663 x 120 ft (1116 x 37 m). Runway 16/34 measures 2670 x 150 ft (814 x 46 m).

For the 12-month period ending December 31, 2015, the airport had 504 aircraft operations per year, an average of 42 per month. It was entirely general aviation. For the same time period, six aircraft were based at the airport: four single-engine airplanes, one multi-engine airplane, and one ultralight.

The airport has a terminal building with an observation deck. The terminal once hosted a creamery and milk transfer station. It was converted into the airport terminal as a Works Progress Administration project. While the terminal building itself has been closed at different times throughout its history, the observation deck has remained open.

== Events ==
The airport hosts regular events such as fly-ins, historical tours, and road races. The airport also hosts artistic groups, especially photographers that use the area to observe stars. While the airport does not host a chapter, it is a regular host for pilots visiting for events and challenges sponsored by the Experimental Aircraft Association.

One of the most popular events the airport hosts is a poker night, which also features competitions like a short takeoff-and-landing competition. The event is sponsored by the Eastern Michigan University flight school to introduce aviation students to different flight scenarios and challenges, such as weather conditions that require pilots to rely heavily on instruments, cross-country flight planning, mountainous terrain and night flying.

== See also ==
- List of airports in Michigan
