= Votruba Block =

- U.S. National Register of Historic Places
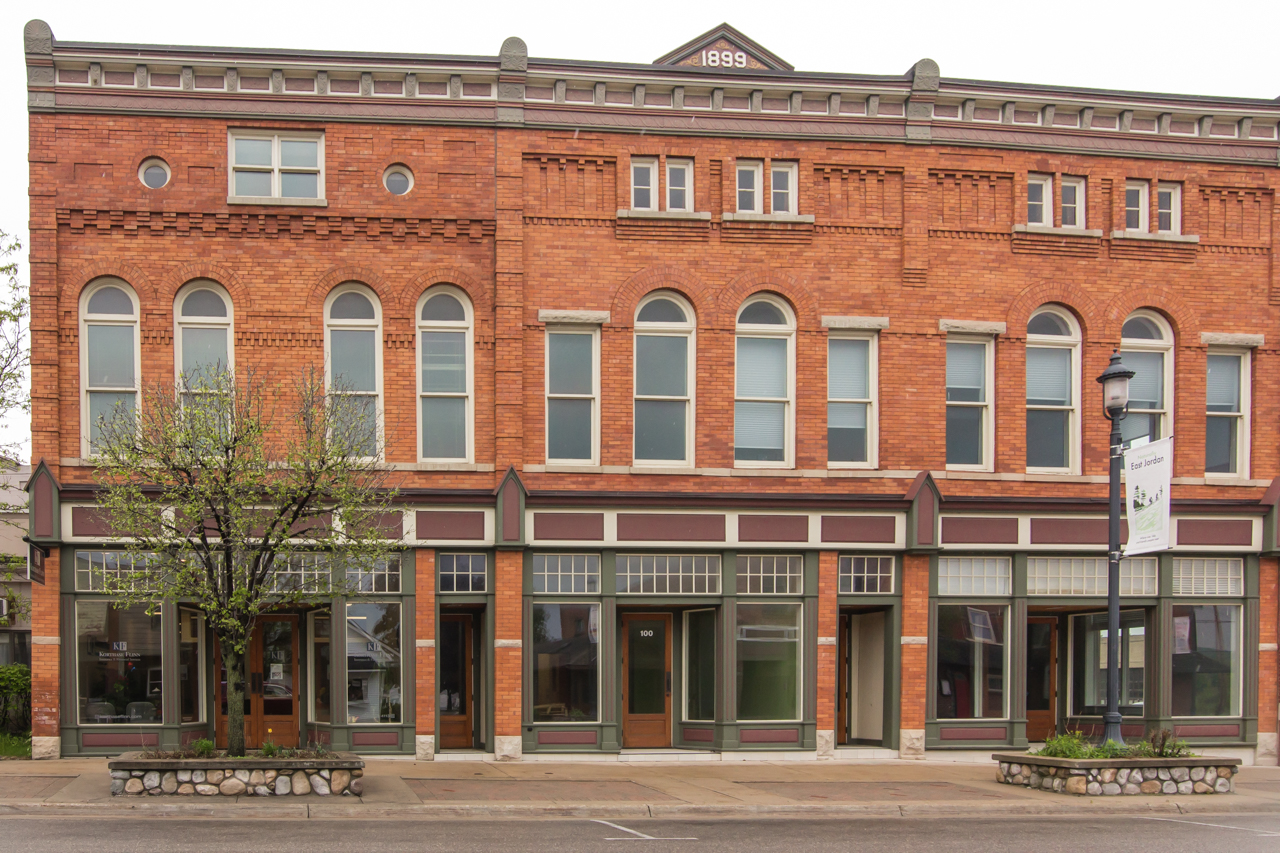
- Votruba Block (left storefront) next to the East Jordan Lumber Company (right two storefronts)

- Location within Michigan Location within the United States
- Interactive map
- Location: 112 Main St, East Jordan, Michigan
- Coordinates: 45°9′17″N 85°7′39″W
- Area: less than one acre
- Built: 1899
- Architectural style: Late Victorian
- NRHP reference No.: 08000585
- Added to NRHP: July 3, 2008

The Votruba Block is a commercial building located at 112 Main Street in East Jordan, Michigan. It was listed in the National Register of Historic Places in 2008. It is next to, and shares a wall with, the East Jordan Lumber Company Store Building; both buildings have been rehabilitated to form the Main Street Center office complex.

== History ==
The Votruba family was part of a substantial settlement of Bohemians in Antrim and Charlevoix counties that began in the late 1860s. John and Anna Votruba were among the settlement's pioneers, settling in the area in 1871. Their son James J. Votruba was born in 1871 shortly after his parent arrived. In the mid-1890s, James Votruba moved to the nearby East Jordan, which was then in the midst of a lumber boom, and apparently became involved in commercial interests in the town.

In 1899, Votruba had this commercial building constructed to house a general store selling groceries, harnesses, and notions. By 1903, Vortuba had given up the business in favor of becoming a travelling salesman, and a new business, the East Jordan Harness Company, occupied the building. This was replaced by a furniture store, possibly owned by Votruba, in 1905. In 1907, James Votruba was back in the general store business, and opened a new store selling groceries, harness, farm implements, confectionery, and other goods in the Votruba block. The upstairs portion of the building briefly housed the Masonic Lodge, and then in 1907-1910 a dance hall. In 1910, the hall reportedly began serving as the meeting place for the Knights of Pythias.

James Votrubacontinued to operate the store until his death in 1928. Afterward, a series of businesses used the space. By the 1950s, Healy Hardware occupied the building, staying until the 1980s. Two pizza businesses followed during the 1990s. The building was vacant for a time, and severe deterioration.

In 2002–2004, it was rehabilitated as part of the Main Street Center office building project.

== Description ==
The Votruba Block is a two-story Late Victorian commercial building with red brick masonry walls, wooden framing, and an iron cornice. It measures 23 feet across and 100 feet in depth. The building has a central-entry storefront on the ground level, with a narrow staircase at one end accessing the second floor. The second story contains two pairs of double-hung windows with round-arch transoms, and the attic story has a short pair of double-hung windows in the center, flanked by a small round window on either side. A decorative galvanized iron cornice tops the facade of the building.

Inside, the first floor of the building originally contained a large store space on the first floor, and a kitchen space was later included at the rear. The front two-thirds of the second story contained an apartment, and the rear section contained a large a single room. The recent rehabilitation project resulted in the redevelopment of both floors into office suites.
