= Charlevoix City Park Site =

Archaeological site in Michigan, United States

- U.S. National Register of Historic Places
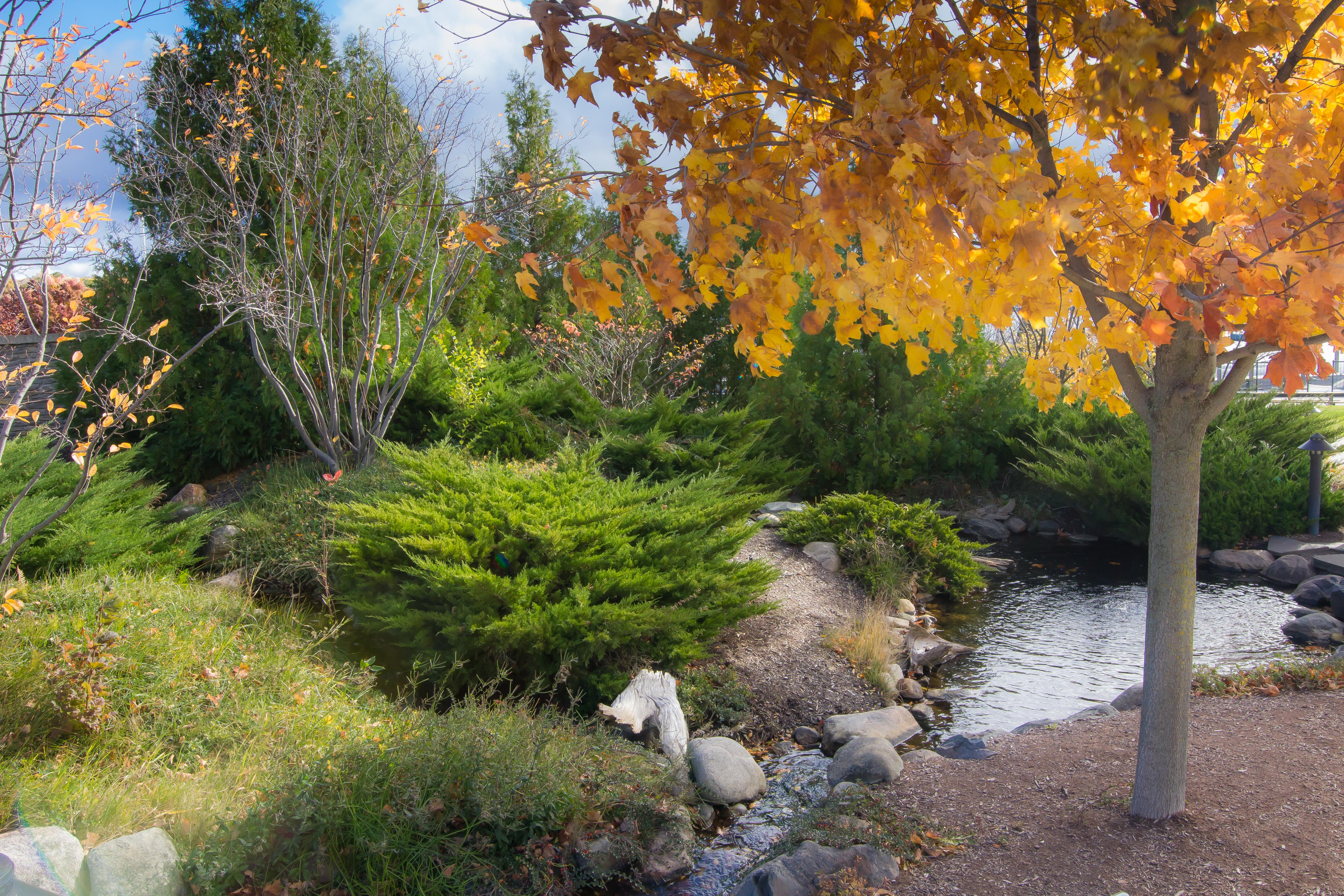

- Location within Michigan Location within the United States
- Location: Park between Bridge Street and Round Lake, Charlevoix, Michigan
- Coordinates: 45°19′0″N 85°15′30″W
- Area: 5 acres (2.0 ha)
- NRHP reference No.: 72000602
- Added to NRHP: March 16, 1972

The Charlevoix City Park Site is an archaeological site located between Bridge Street and Round Lake in Charlevoix, Michigan. It was listed on the National Register of Historic Places in 1972.

The site is a Woodland period occupation, approximately AD 1000 - AD 1300.
