= Wood Site =

Archaeological site in Michigan, United States

- U.S. National Register of Historic Places
- Location within Michigan Location within the United States
- Location: Along Lake Michigan, Hayes Township, Charlevoix County, Michigan
- Coordinates: 45°22′0″N 85°7′0″W
- Area: 17 acres (6.9 ha)
- NRHP reference No.: 76001026
- Added to NRHP: May 19, 1976

The Wood Site is an archaeological site located in Hayes Township in Charlevoix County, Michigan. It was listed on the National Register of Historic Places in 1976.

The Wood Site was a seasonally occupied fishing camp used during the Late Woodland period, from about AD 1020-AD 1510.
