= Belvedere Club =

US home association

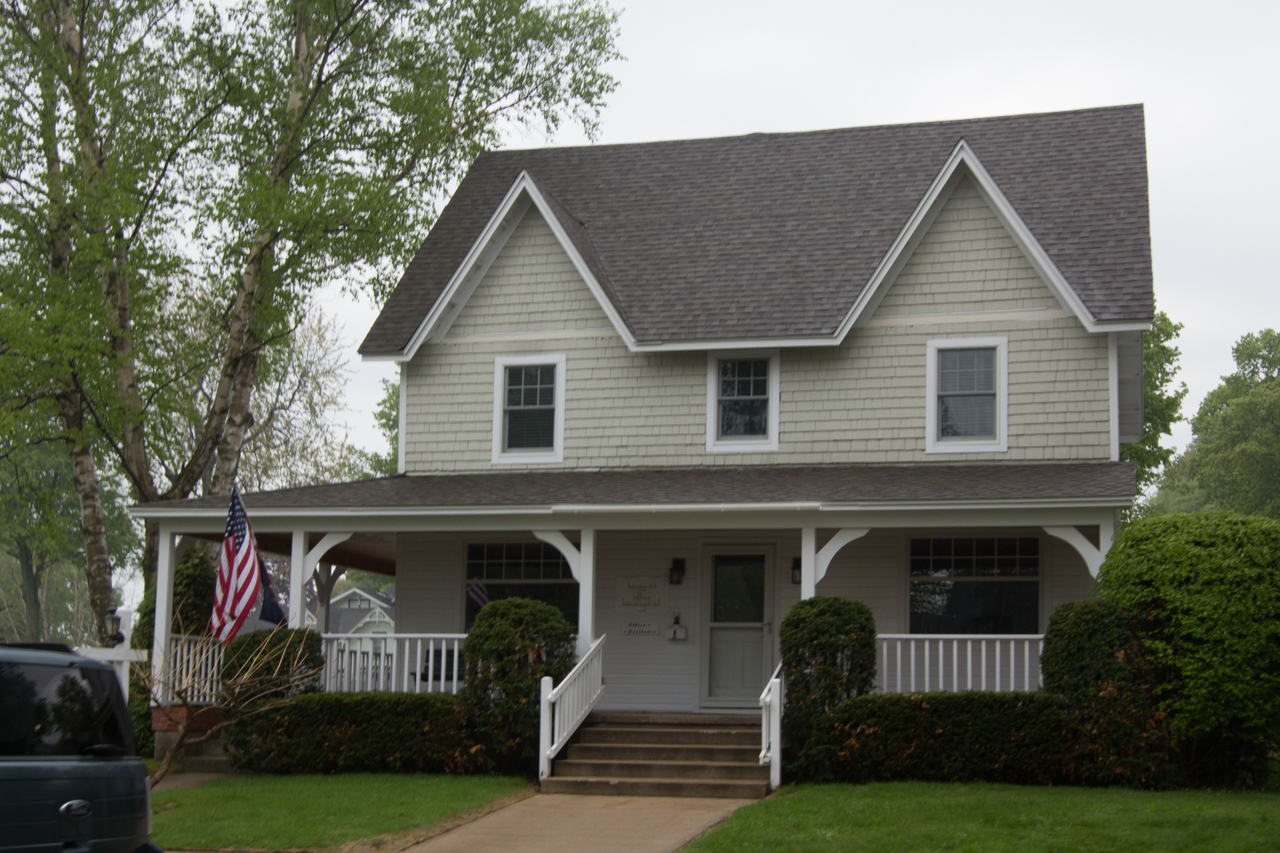
- Belvedere Club headquarters

- Location within the state of Michigan
- 45°17′32″N 85°16′08″W
- Location: 512 Belvedere Club; Marion Township, Michigan
- Nearest city: Charlevoix, Michigan

History
- Founded: 1878 (148 years ago)

Michigan State Historic Site
- Designated: November 14, 1974

The Belvedere Club, located south of Charlevoix, Michigan is a summer home association of 91 cottages between Round Lake and Lake Charlevoix in Northern Michigan founded in 1878.

Members are generally from upper class households and originate from the Midwest and South. Many families have been resorting to the club for generations. During the summer season, late June through Labor Day, the club's entrance is staffed to limit non-member tourist traffic. Most of the cottages are not winterized, but the summer season has been expanding in recent decades to include cottages opening in the spring with many cottages remaining in use through Michigan's fall leaf color season.

The club's grounds include a beach, a tennis club, parks and gardens, and a casino dining club, all of which are private. The Belvedere Golf Club, home of the Michigan Amateur Golf Championship for many decades in the mid-20th century, is affiliated with the Belvedere Club. The grounds lie partly in Charlevoix Township and partly in Marion Township, in Charlevoix County, Michigan.

The club was founded in 1878 by Baptists from Kalamazoo as the Charlevoix Resort Association. In 1879, a boarding-home style hotel was built on the grounds for guests and loggers. The land was divided into lots and leased for construction of summer cottages. Cottage-building had accelerated by 1882; by various estimates, most cottages were constructed either before 1900 or before 1940. Most feature ornate, bargeboard cupolas and textured wall surfaces. In 1923, a casino was built and the name of the association was changed to the Belvedere Club.

In 1887, the 40-room Belvedere Hotel was built on the grounds of the club, replacing the previous hotel that burned down in 1886. The hotel would later be expanded to 85 rooms by 1902, hosting prominent guests such as Eliot Ness, Edgar Rice Burroughs, Bing Crosby, Booth Tarkington, Adlai Stevenson, Barry Goldwater, and Dean Acheson. The hotel was demolished in 1960, following a postwar decline in the 1950s.

The club was designated a Michigan State Historic Site on November 14, 1974.

The casino building was destroyed by arson on October 23, 2025.

== See also ==
- List of Michigan State Historic Sites in Charlevoix County, Michigan
