= Greensky Hill church =

- Greensky Hill Mission
- U.S. National Register of Historic Places
- Michigan State Historic Site
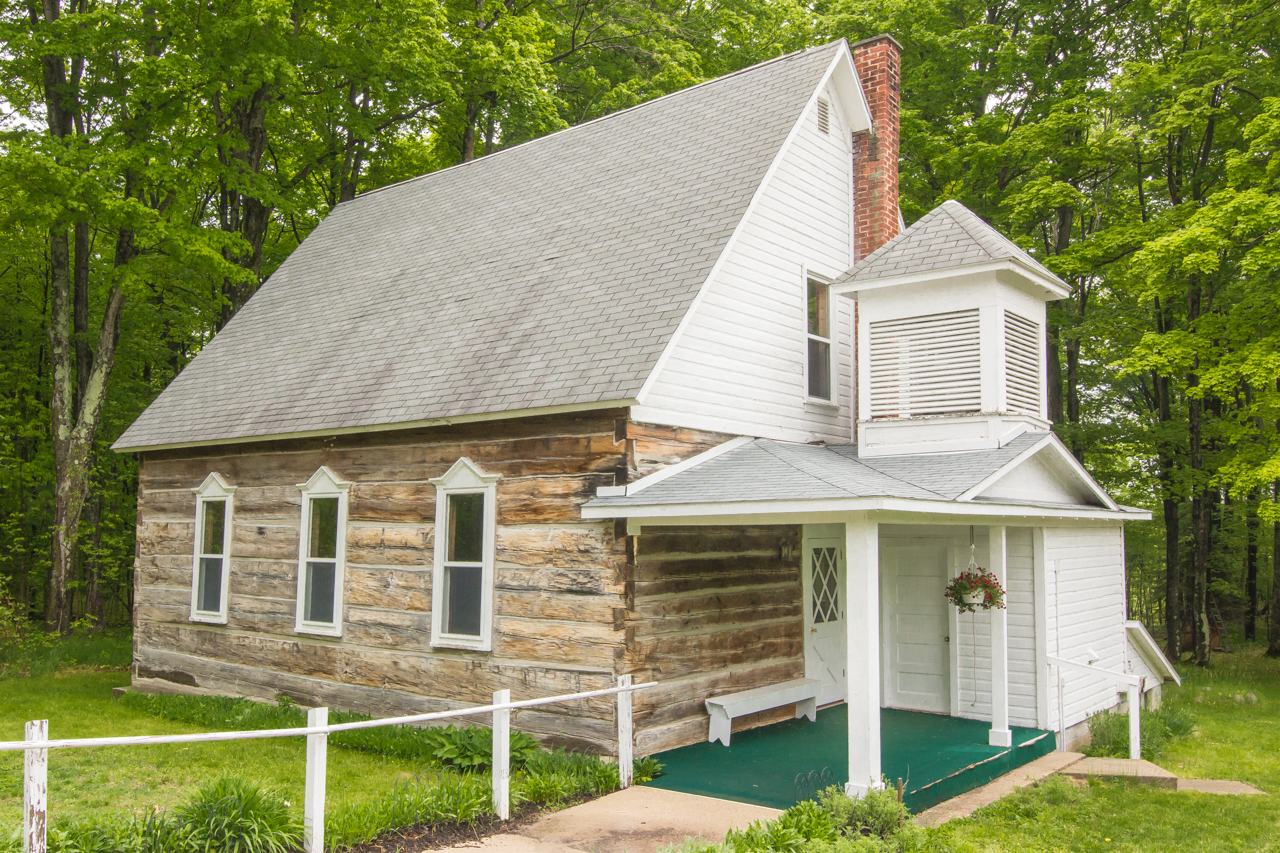

- Location within Michigan
- Interactive map
- Nearest city: Charlevoix, Michigan
- Coordinates: 45°19′42″N 85°11′5″W
- Area: 1 acre (0.40 ha)
- NRHP reference No.: 72000603
- Added to NRHP: March 16, 1972

Greensky Hill Indian United Methodist Church is located east of Charlevoix, Michigan at the junction of U.S. 31 and CR 630. On March 16, 1972, it was added to the National Register of Historic Places. The church has been preserved with all of the original woodwork and can comfortably seat about 80 people.

The church serves a free community breakfast every Sunday morning. The meal is open to all, with no religious expectations or requirements.

== History ==
The church was founded by Peter Greensky, also known as Shagasokicki, a Chippewa chief who had been converted to Christianity and became a preacher. It was founded in 1844. Greensky worked with Salmon Steele in operating the Pine River Indian Mission. He was later connected with the Isabella Indian Mission. From 1869-1871 he was in charge of the Oceana Indian Mission.

He decided to build a Protestant mission where he could preach and convert his Native American brothers and sisters to Christianity. According to the historical marker at the church, the first services were held in makeshift buildings of bark and boughs until the 1850s, when a church was constructed from lumber brought by canoe from Traverse City and then ported two miles to the site of the present day church. Around the church was a circle of "council trees" where the Indian chiefs could meet in peace to discuss tribal issues.

== Today ==
The original church is still used by a congregation that celebrates both Christianity and Native American customs. In regular attendance are Peter Greensky's descendants: his great-great-great-grandson, Ray Greensky and Ray's son Brayden Greensky and daughter Isabelle Jean Greensky.
