= Pewangoing Quarry =

Archaeological site in Michigan, United States

- U.S. National Register of Historic Places
- U.S. Historic district – Contributing property
- Location within Michigan Location within the United States
- Location: Along Lake Michigan, north of Norwood, Michigan
- Coordinates: 45°14′50″N 85°22′55″W
- Area: less than one acre
- Part of: Pi-wan-go-ning Prehistoric District (ID73002153)
- NRHP reference No.: 72001471
- Added to NRHP: June 20, 1972

The Pewangoing Quarry, also designated 20CX20, is an archaeological site located along Lake Michigan just north of Norwood, Michigan. It was listed on the National Register of Historic Places in 1972, and is included in the Pi-wan-go-ning Prehistoric District.

The quarry provided flint used in tool-making from the Early Archaic through Late Woodland periods.
