= Feodar Protar Cabin =

- U.S. National Register of Historic Places
- Michigan State Historic Site
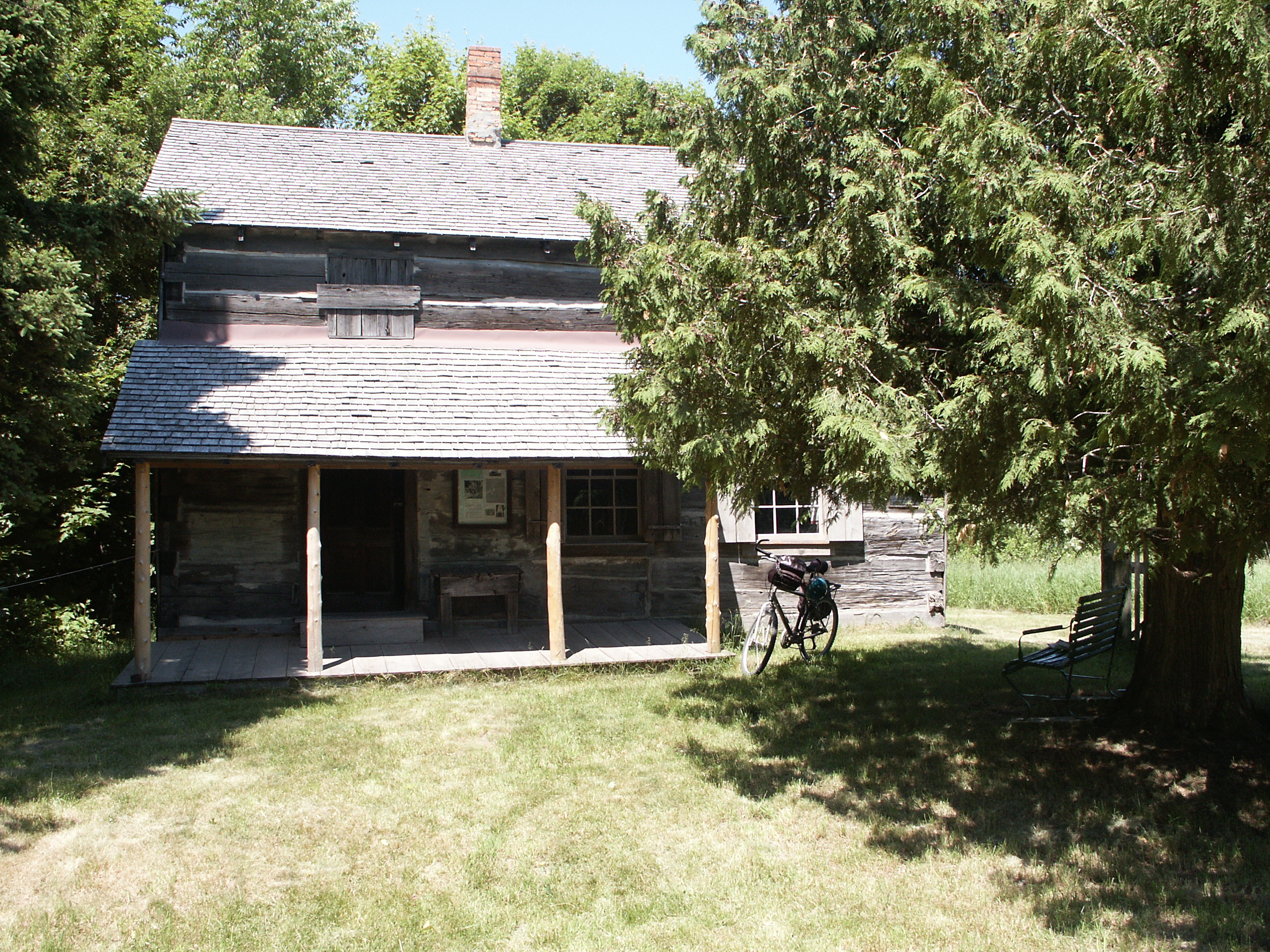

- Location within Michigan Location within the United States
- Interactive map
- Nearest city: St. James, Michigan
- Coordinates: 45°42′13″N 85°33′48″W
- Area: 9 acres (3.6 ha)
- Built: 1860
- Architectural style: Log cabin
- NRHP reference No.: 72000604
- Added to NRHP: March 16, 1972

The Feodar Protar Cabin is a historic log cabin located on Sloptown Road west of Donnel Mor's Lane in Peaine Township, Michigan, near St. James, Michigan on Beaver Island. It was listed in the National Register of Historic Places in 1972. As of 2017, it is operated as a museum by the Beaver Island Historical Society.

== History ==
Feodar (or Feodor) Protar was born in Estonia. He was said to have been influenced by the writings of Leo Tolstoy and exiled. He settled in Dresden, and when his wife died in 1870, emigrated to the United States. He toured for a time with actress Fanny Janauschek, and in 1882 purchased and began operating a German newspaper in Rock Island, Illinois. In 1887, while on a trip in Lake Michigan, a storm forced Protar's ship into the Beaver Island harbor at St. James. He became enchanted with the island, and spent his summers there for the next five years.

In 1893, Protar moved to Beaver Island permanently. He chose for his house a log cabin constructed by an Irish settler in about 1860. He soon realized the extreme need on the island for a physician, began studying medicine, and was soon practicing as an unlicensed physician. Protar continued living in this house, and practicing medicine, until his death in 1925, never leaving the island.

Protar's neighbors erected a bronze tablet on his grave in 1928, reading, "to our Heaven sent friend in need, Feodora Protar, who never failed us. In imperishable gratitude and adoration. His people of Beaver Island." The cabin fell disrepair for a number of years, and in 1971 a new roof and porch were constructed. The Beaver Island Historical Society maintains the home, under the guidance of Antje Price, who translated Protar's diaries.

== Description ==
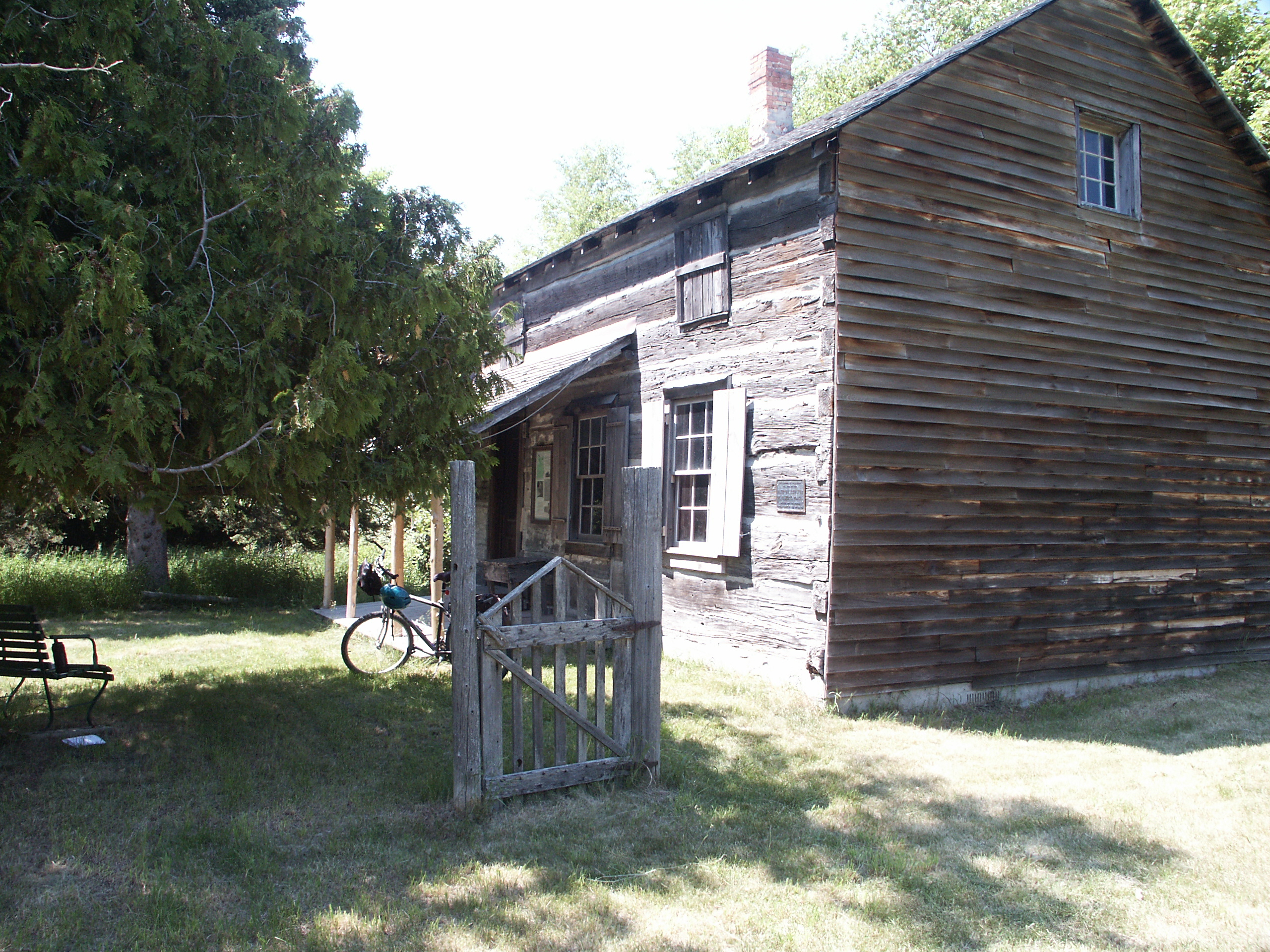
Angle view

The Feodar Protar Cabin is a 1 1/2-story building measuring about 32 feet by 16 feet. The walls are made of square-hewn white pine logs with flat notches at the corners. Narrow clapboards cover some portions of the cabin. The roof is covered with wooden shingles. The interior of the cabin is paneled with vertical pine boards. Many of the interior furnishings still in the cabin belonged to Protar.
