= East Jordan, Michigan =

- City
- City of East Jordan
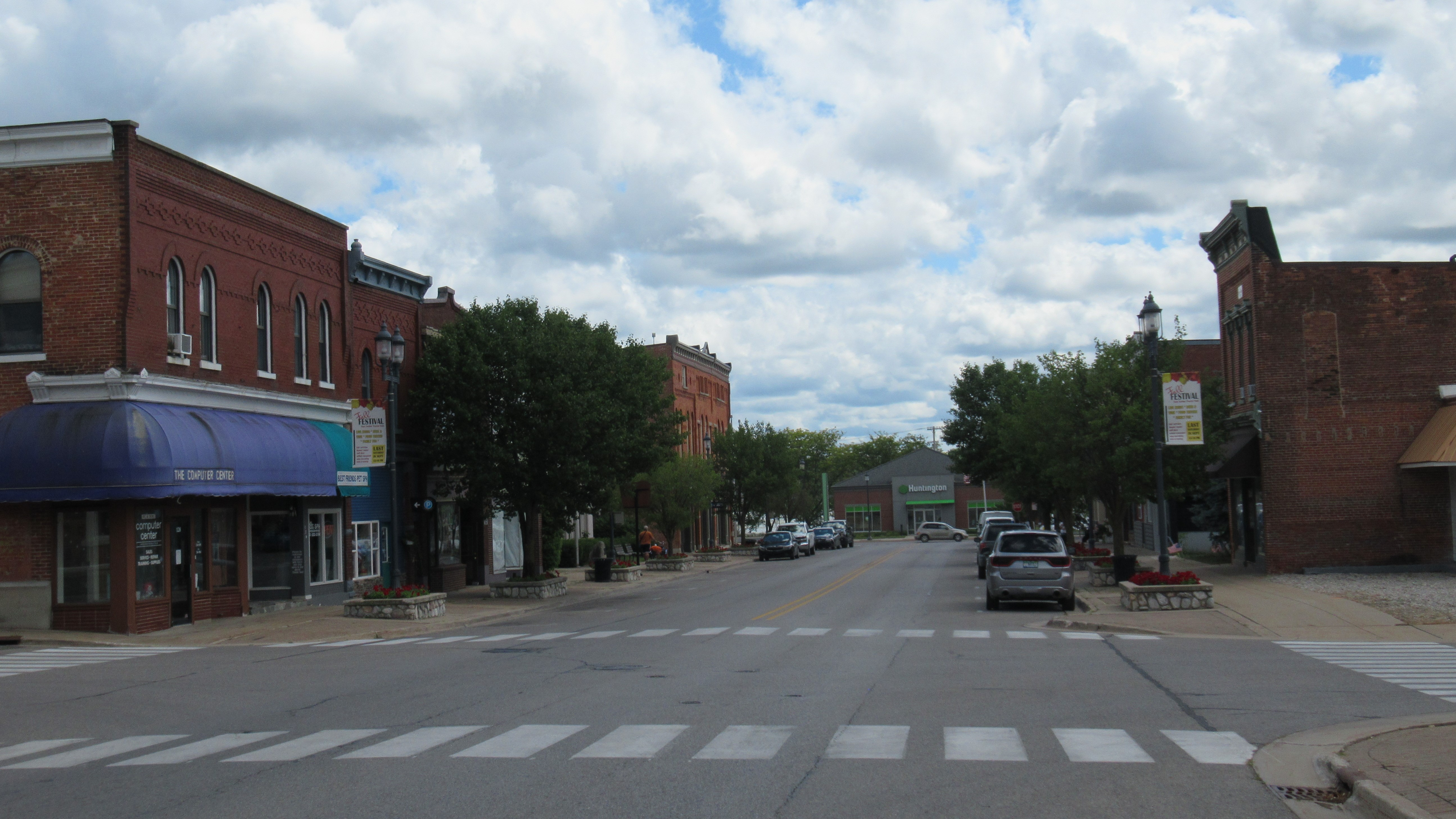
- Looking south along Main Street
- Motto: "Where River, Lake, and Friendly People Meet"
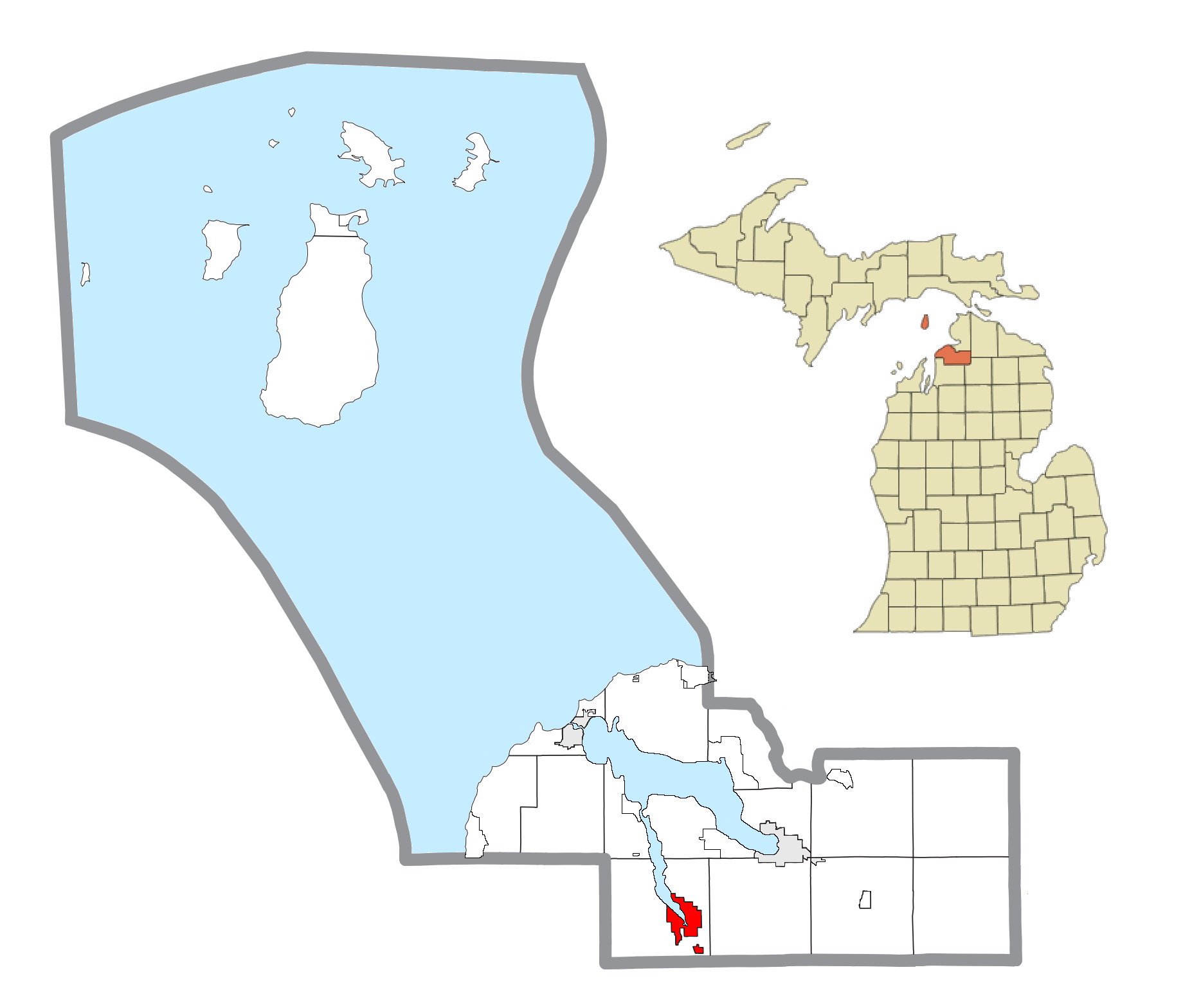
- Location within Charlevoix County

- Location within the state of Michigan Location within the United States
- Coordinates: 45°09′21″N 85°07′41″W
- Country: United States
- State: Michigan
- County: Charlevoix
- Settled: 1873
- Incorporated: 1887 (village); 1911 (city)

Government
  - Type: City commission
  - Mayor: Melyssa Lindenthal
  - Administrator: Tom Cannon
  - Clerk: Cheltzi Wilson

Area
  - Total: 3.92 sq mi (10.15 km^{2})
  - Land: 3.00 sq mi (7.77 km^{2})
  - Water: 0.92 sq mi (2.38 km^{2})
- Elevation: 646 ft (197 m)

Population (2020)
  - Total: 2,239
  - Density: 746.4/sq mi (288.19/km^{2})
- Time zone: UTC-5 (Eastern (EST))
  - Summer (DST): UTC-4 (EDT)
- ZIP code(s): 49727
- Area code: 231
- FIPS code: 26-24020
- GNIS feature ID: 0625200
- Website: Official website

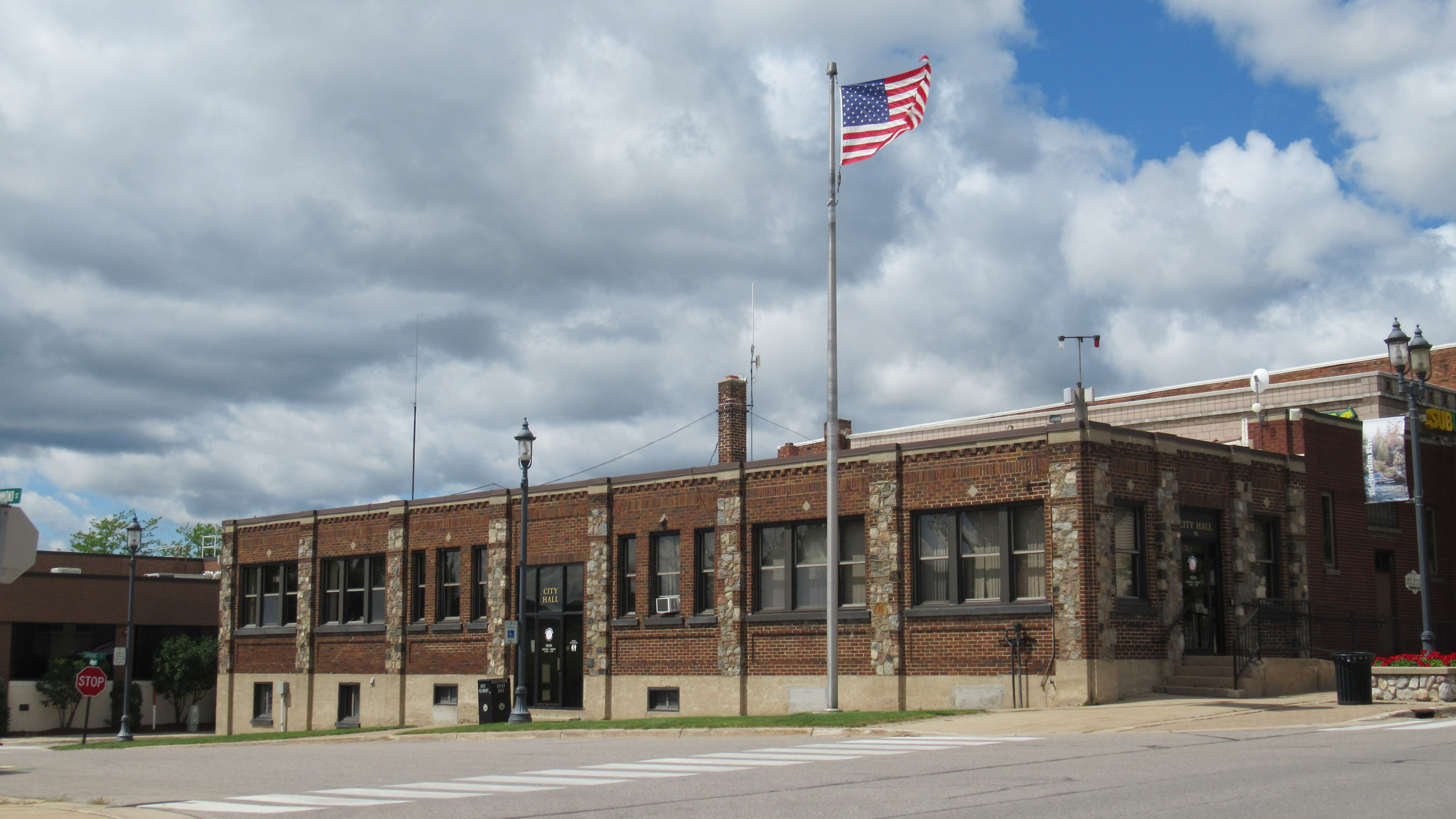
East Jordan City Hall

East Jordan is a city in Charlevoix County in the U.S. state of Michigan. The population was 2,239 at the 2020 census.

The city is at the end of the south arm of Lake Charlevoix at the mouth of the Jordan River. The corporate headquarters of EJ, an international company formerly known as East Jordan Iron Works, is located in East Jordan. EJ was founded in East Jordan in 1883.

== History ==
The area was first settled by Canadian William Empey in 1873. He built the first store here in 1874 at the mouth of the Jordan River at the southernmost point of Lake Charlevoix. He became the first postmaster when the post office opened on May 31, 1878. The community absorbed the nearby village of South Arm and incorporated as the village of East Jordan in 1887. It incorporated as a city in 1911.

East Jordan grew quickly, and by 1890, it boasted a large ironworks company now known as EJ. The city was serviced by two railroads. With these two railroad connections, and the ability to ship cargo up Lake Charlevoix to Lake Michigan, East Jordan quickly grew into a major manufacturing center. To this day, four industrial corporations still operate within the town. In 1899, the Detroit and Charlevoix Railroad built their mainline through the East side of the city, and in 1901, the East Jordan and Southern Railroad began operations on the western end of the city. In 1932, the Detroit and Charlevoix was abandoned, and the East Jordan and Southern closed in 1961 after the East Jordan Iron Works ended shipping by rail.

East Jordan contains two listing on the National Register of Historic Places. The East Jordan Lumber Company Store Building and the Votruba Block were both built in 1899 and are located next to each other in the city's downtown area.

== Geography ==
According to the U.S. Census Bureau, the city has a total area of 3.92 square miles (10.15 km^{2}), of which 3.00 square miles (7.77 km^{2}) is land and 0.92 square miles (2.38 km^{2}) (23.47%) is water.

The city boundaries contain an exclave which is used to incorporate the East Jordan City Airport to the southeast of the city.

=== Major highways ===
- M-32 enters the city from the east and has its western terminus at M-66. within East Jordan.
- M-66 runs south–north through the western portion of the city.
- C-48 is a county-designated highway that runs through the center of the city and briefly concurrent with M-32.

=== Climate ===
This climatic region has large seasonal temperature differences, with warm to hot (and often humid) summers and cold (sometimes severely cold) winters. According to the Köppen Climate Classification system, East Jordan has a humid continental climate, abbreviated "Dfb" on climate maps.

Climate data for East Jordan, Michigan (1991–2020 normals, extremes 1926–present)
Month	Jan	Feb	Mar	Apr	May	Jun	Jul	Aug	Sep	Oct	Nov	Dec	Year
Record high °F (°C)	55 (13)	65 (18)	87 (31)	90 (32)	97 (36)	102 (39)	103 (39)	100 (38)	97 (36)	88 (31)	78 (26)	65 (18)	103 (39)
Mean daily maximum °F (°C)	30.4 (−0.9)	32.9 (0.5)	42.9 (6.1)	56.0 (13.3)	70.0 (21.1)	79.2 (26.2)	82.6 (28.1)	80.9 (27.2)	73.7 (23.2)	60.3 (15.7)	46.5 (8.1)	35.4 (1.9)	57.6 (14.2)
Daily mean °F (°C)	22.7 (−5.2)	23.6 (−4.7)	32.0 (0.0)	43.6 (6.4)	55.7 (13.2)	65.0 (18.3)	68.9 (20.5)	67.4 (19.7)	60.6 (15.9)	49.4 (9.7)	38.4 (3.6)	28.8 (−1.8)	46.3 (7.9)
Mean daily minimum °F (°C)	15.1 (−9.4)	14.2 (−9.9)	21.1 (−6.1)	31.2 (−0.4)	41.4 (5.2)	50.8 (10.4)	55.2 (12.9)	53.8 (12.1)	47.5 (8.6)	38.4 (3.6)	30.3 (−0.9)	22.3 (−5.4)	35.1 (1.7)
Record low °F (°C)	−36 (−38)	−41 (−41)	−29 (−34)	−7 (−22)	13 (−11)	26 (−3)	33 (1)	30 (−1)	23 (−5)	15 (−9)	−14 (−26)	−31 (−35)	−41 (−41)
Average precipitation inches (mm)	2.04 (52)	1.34 (34)	1.54 (39)	2.52 (64)	2.98 (76)	3.15 (80)	2.90 (74)	3.26 (83)	3.74 (95)	4.37 (111)	2.76 (70)	2.24 (57)	32.84 (834)
Average snowfall inches (cm)	37.4 (95)	23.1 (59)	11.0 (28)	4.6 (12)	0.0 (0.0)	0.0 (0.0)	0.0 (0.0)	0.0 (0.0)	0.0 (0.0)	0.7 (1.8)	10.0 (25)	35.4 (90)	122.2 (310)
Average precipitation days (≥ 0.01 in)	17.3	12.4	9.5	11.4	11.5	10.4	9.8	10.0	11.3	14.6	14.6	16.1	148.9
Average snowy days (≥ 0.1 in)	15.6	11.0	5.5	2.2	0.1	0.0	0.0	0.0	0.0	0.4	5.0	12.5	52.3
Source: NOAA

== Demographics ==
Historical population
Census	Pop.	Note	%±
1890	731		—
1900	1,205		64.8%
1910	2,516		108.8%
1920	2,428		−3.5%
1930	1,523		−37.3%
1940	1,725		13.3%
1950	1,779		3.1%
1960	1,919		7.9%
1970	2,041		6.4%
1980	2,185		7.1%
1990	2,240		2.5%
2000	2,507		11.9%
2010	2,351		−6.2%
2020	2,239		−4.8%
U.S. Decennial Census

=== 2020 census ===
As of the 2020 census, East Jordan had a population of 2,239. The median age was 38.9 years. 23.4% of residents were under the age of 18 and 17.5% of residents were 65 years of age or older. For every 100 females there were 89.7 males, and for every 100 females age 18 and over there were 85.8 males age 18 and over.

0.0% of residents lived in urban areas, while 100.0% lived in rural areas.

There were 946 households in East Jordan, of which 29.7% had children under the age of 18 living in them. Of all households, 38.3% were married-couple households, 18.6% were households with a male householder and no spouse or partner present, and 33.4% were households with a female householder and no spouse or partner present. About 34.1% of all households were made up of individuals and 17.2% had someone living alone who was 65 years of age or older.

There were 1,138 housing units, of which 16.9% were vacant. The homeowner vacancy rate was 1.2% and the rental vacancy rate was 7.0%.

Racial composition as of the 2020 census
Race	Number	Percent
White	2,024	90.4%
Black or African American	7	0.3%
American Indian and Alaska Native	53	2.4%
Asian	0	0.0%
Native Hawaiian and Other Pacific Islander	2	0.1%
Some other race	12	0.5%
Two or more races	141	6.3%
Hispanic or Latino (of any race)	49	2.2%

=== 2010 census ===
As of the census of 2010, there were 2,351 people, 952 households, and 613 families residing in the city. The population density was 770.8 inhabitants per square mile (297.6/km^{2}). There were 1,189 housing units at an average density of 389.8 per square mile (150.5/km^{2}). The racial makeup of the city was 96.0% White, 0.2% African American, 1.6% Native American, 0.1% Asian, 0.3% from other races, and 1.8% from two or more races. Hispanic or Latino people of any race were 2.3% of the population.

There were 952 households, of which 35.6% had children under the age of 18 living with them, 43.2% were married couples living together, 14.3% had a female householder with no husband present, 6.9% had a male householder with no wife present, and 35.6% were non-families. 29.7% of all households were made up of individuals, and 13.5% had someone living alone who was 65 years of age or older. The average household size was 2.46 and the average family size was 3.01.

The median age in the city was 37.1 years. 27.1% of residents were under the age of 18; 7.8% were between the ages of 18 and 24; 25.4% were from 25 to 44; 24.5% were from 45 to 64; and 15.2% were 65 years of age or older. The gender makeup of the city was 48.7% male and 51.3% female.

=== 2000 census ===
As of the census of 2000, there were 2,507 people, 946 households, and 658 families residing in the city. The population density was 818.7 inhabitants per square mile (316.1/km^{2}). There were 1,083 housing units at an average density of 353.7 per square mile (136.6/km^{2}). The racial makeup of the city was 94.38% White, 0.40% African American, 1.76% Native American, 0.16% Asian, 0.76% from other races, and 2.55% from two or more races. Hispanic or Latino people of any race were 1.60% of the population.

There were 946 households, out of which 36.9% had children under the age of 18 living with them, 50.1% were married couples living together, 13.4% had a female householder with no husband present, and 30.4% were non-families. 25.7% of all households were made up of individuals, and 11.2% had someone living alone who was 65 years of age or older. The average household size was 2.63 and the average family size was 3.11.

In the city, the population was spread out, with 30.5% under the age of 18, 8.9% from 18 to 24, 28.6% from 25 to 44, 17.4% from 45 to 64, and 14.6% who were 65 years of age or older. The median age was 33 years. For every 100 females, there were 94.5 males. For every 100 females age 18 and over, there were 87.8 males.

The median income for a household in the city was $35,924, and the median income for a family was $39,669. Males had a median income of $31,597 versus $20,385 for females. The per capita income for the city was $14,920. About 7.5% of families and 10.6% of the population were below the poverty line, including 12.5% of those under age 18 and 10.2% of those age 65 or over.

== Education ==
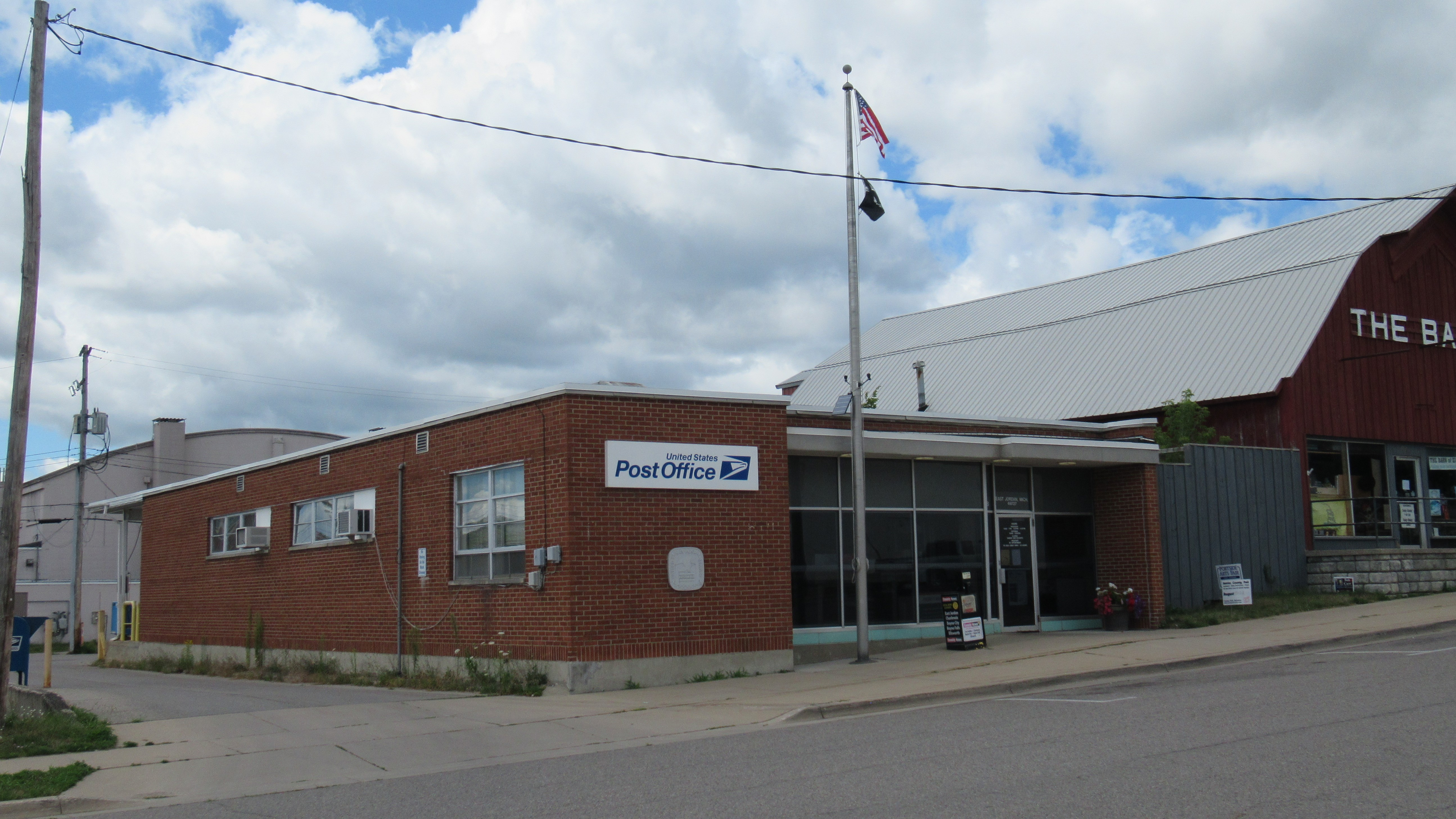
U.S. Post Office in East Jordan

East Jordan is served by its own school district, East Jordan Public Schools, which is centered in the city and serves larger portions of several townships.
