= Clinton F. Woolsey =

American army aviator and flying instructor

Clinton F. Woolsey DFC
- Born: Clinton Fisk Woolsey; August 29, 1894; Leelanau County, Michigan
- Died: February 26, 1927 (aged 32); Buenos Aires, Argentina
- Other name: Clint
- Occupation: Pilot
- Employer: United States Army
- Known for: Pan American Goodwill Flight, 1926-1927

Clinton Fisk Woolsey (August 29, 1894 – February 26, 1927) was an early United States Army aviator and flying instructor. He served as a pilot in World War I and on the Mexican border. Woolsey was slated to become the first pilot to travel over the Atlantic Ocean when, as part of the 22,000 mile first ever Pan American Goodwill flight of 1926–27 to 23 countries in Central and South America, he died in a crash over Buenos Aires while piloting the Detroit. He was one of the last pilots to instruct Charles Lindbergh, and it was Lindbergh who fulfilled Woolsey's vision of flying over the Atlantic three months after his death.

Woolsey was awarded the Distinguished Flying Cross. An airport in his home town of Northport, Michigan bears his name.

== Early life and education ==
Woolsey was born in Leelanau County, Michigan, on August 29, 1894, the son of Byron Woolsey and Sarah Hall. Woolsey's grandfather, Chauncey Woolsey, died in 1864 at the Battle of Totopotomoy Creek in Hanover County, Virginia during the Civil War. His great-grandfather, Adolphus Woolsey, served in the War of 1812. Woolsey was a descendant of George (Joris) Woolsey, 17th Century settler of New Amsterdam and progenitor of the Woolsey family in America.

Woolsey grew up on a dairy farm and attended school in Northport. He later studied engineering at Valparaiso University in Indiana for three years.

== Early career and military service ==
Woolsey enlisted in the Indiana National Guard in 1916, ultimately gaining a commission as a 2nd lieutenant of artillery at the officers’ training course at Fort Benjamin Harrison near Indianapolis. He served a brief stint on the Mexican border, and subsequently worked at steel mills, in Gary, Indiana. Returning to the Guard, Woolsey transferred to Camp Taylor in Kentucky to serve as an instructor, and it was here that he gained the desire to become a pilot. He went to Kelly Field in San Antonio, Texas for his pilot training. Kelly Field was one of 32 flight training locations to train Army pilots for the War. Woolsey received subsequent flight training in Dayton, Ohio and at Mitchell Field in Long Island, New York. He served briefly in Europe during the end of the war.

In 1925, at Brooks Field in Texas, Colonel Charles A. Lindbergh received his final pilot training from Woolsey.

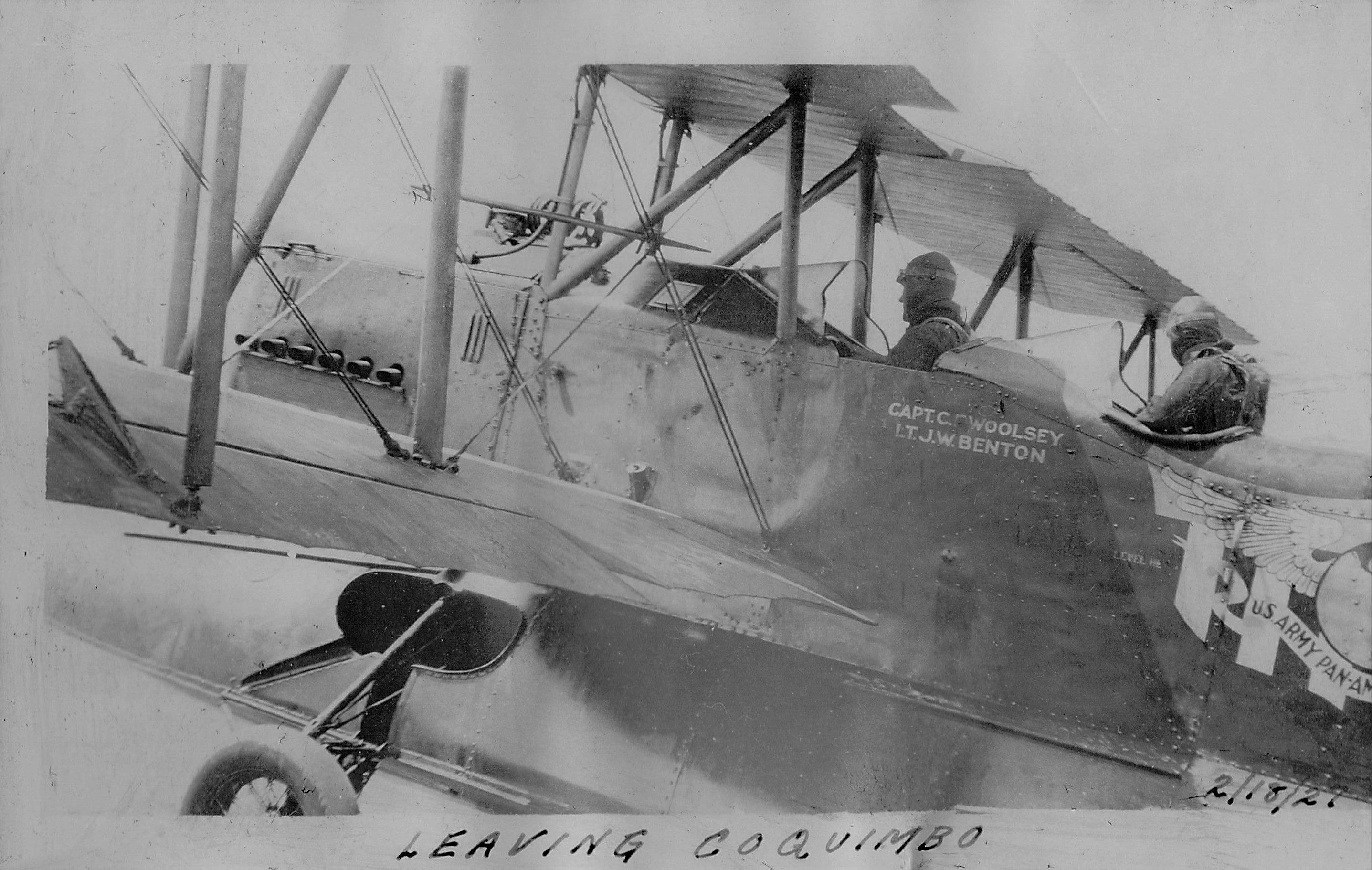

== Pan American Goodwill Flight and death ==
In 1926 Woolsey flew to Central and South America as part of the Pan American Goodwill Flight a 22,000-mile (35,000 km) pioneering flight that sought to promote air postal service, U.S. commercial aviation and take messages of friendship to the governments and people of the Americas while establishing new aerial navigation routes. The flight originated with five aircraft and crews taking off from Kelly Field on December 21, 1926, seeking to land in 23 Central and South American countries.

The aircraft used for the journey were new observation planes, the Loening OA-1A that could be used as both land planes and sea planes, with Liberty engines and a wood interior structure with an aluminum-covered fuselage and fabric-covered wings. Each plane was named for a U.S. city and crewed by two pilots, one of whom was an engineering officer, since there were very few airfields or repair facilities along the route, with the crew choosing the motto "No Work, No Ride."

Crew of the New York: Maj. Herbert Dargue, Lt. Ennis Whitehead; Crew of the San Antonio: Capt. Arthur McDaniel, Lt. Charles Robinson; Crew of the San Francisco: Capt. Ira Eaker, Lt. Muir Fairchild; Crew of the Detroit: Woolsey, Lt. John Benton; Crew of the St. Louis: Lt. Bernard Thompson, Lt. Leonard Weddington

On February 26, 1927, the five aircraft left Chile bound for Mar de Plata, an Argentine city 290 miles south of Buenos Aires, under foggy conditions over the Andes Mountains. The Detroit had the cable to the left wheel used for landing break, so Woolsey and Benton decided to fly to Buenos Aires with the wheel retracted, and intended to crawl out to manually release the wheel prior to landing. At roughly 1600 feet Benton climbed out on the wing to lower the wheel. The Detroit and New York accidentally collided mid-air and got locked together.

The crew of the New York were able to parachute to safety before their plane crashed. Woolsey and Benton were killed when the Detroit hit the ground and burst into flames. Woolsey died largely because he remained with the plane as Benton did not have a parachute on when he went onto the wing. "I have never witnessed a more courageous sacrifice," said Eaker, who witnessed the crash from his plane.

After his death Woolsey, along with Benton, lay in state in Buenos Aires as thousands paid tribute. More than 2,000 people, including 150 former servicemen, attended the funeral in Northport which took place in a snowstorm. He is buried at the Leelenau Township Cemetery.

Woolsey intended to be the first to fly solo over the Atlantic. He had already designed a plane and wanted to have it built when he returned from the Pan American tour.

== Awards ==
Woolsey, along with all of the Pan American pilots, were awarded the Mackay Trophy, and he was posthumously decorated in May 1927 with the Distinguished Flying Cross.

== Personal life ==
Coat of Arms of Clinton F. Woolsey

In Malines, Belgium in 1919 Woolsey married Marietta Rosalia "Rosalie" Dujardin, a Red Cross volunteer during the War. They had two daughters.

In July 1922 Woolsey and his family survived a plane crash near St. Augustine, Florida without injuries.

Mrs. Woolsey traveled frequently between Europe and the US after his death, and she died in Belgium in 1963.

== Legacy ==
On July 14, 1935, the Clinton F. Woolsey Memorial Airport in Leelanau County was dedicated. The airport was formed on 200 acres supplied by both Byron Woolsey, Clinton's father, and Leelanau Township, Michigan.
