= Advance, Michigan =

- Census-designated place (CDP) & unincorporated community
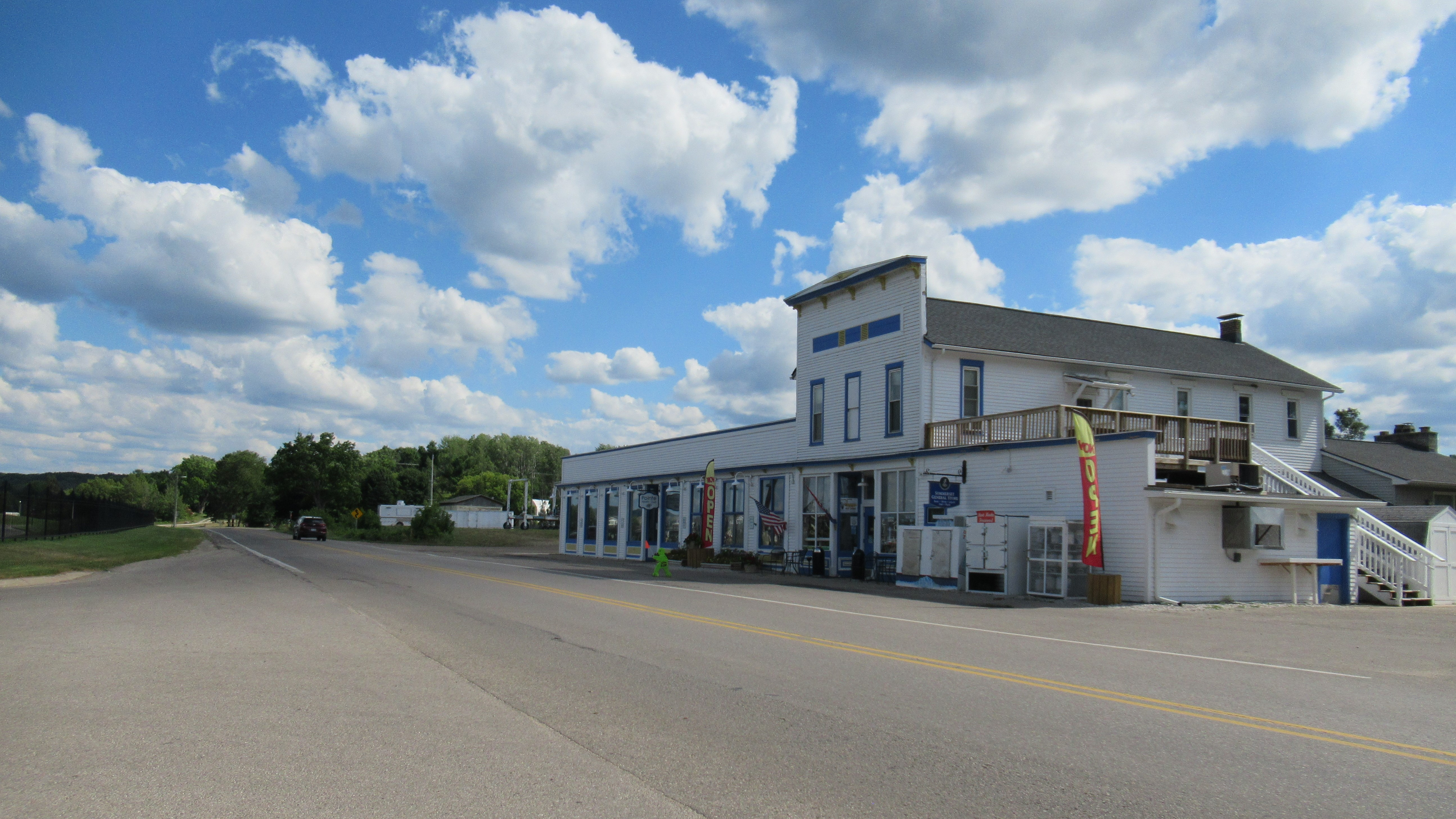
- Sommerset General Store on Lake Shore Drive

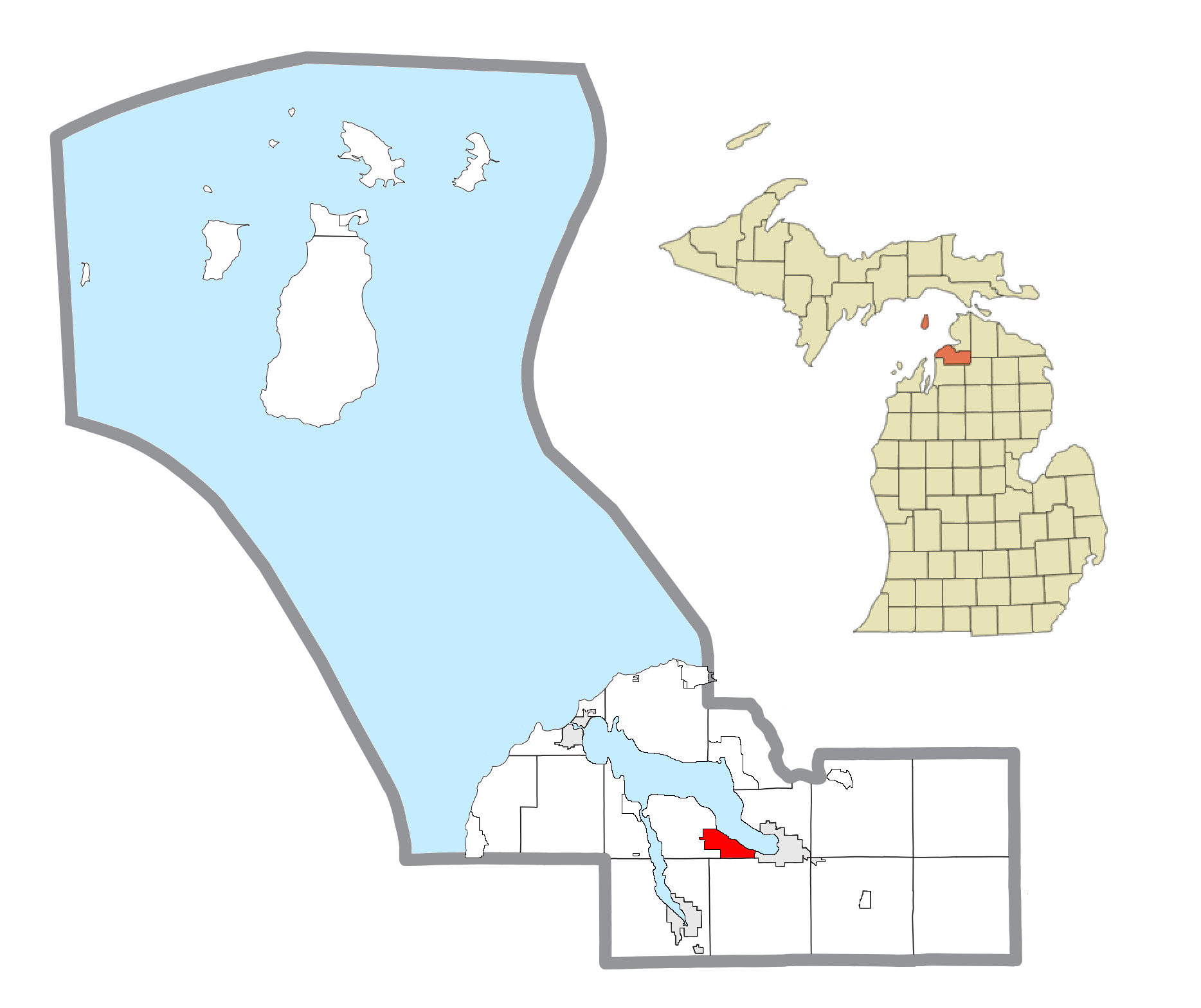
- Location within Charlevoix County

- Location within the state of Michigan Location within the United States
- Coordinates: 45°13′17″N 85°04′39″W
- Country: United States
- State: Michigan
- County: Charlevoix
- Township: Eveline
- Settled: 1865

Area
  - Total: 2.75 sq mi (7.12 km^{2})
  - Land: 2.72 sq mi (7.04 km^{2})
  - Water: 0.027 sq mi (0.07 km^{2})
- Elevation: 598 ft (182 m)

Population (2020)
  - Total: 340
  - Density: 125.0/sq mi (48.26/km^{2})
- Time zone: UTC-5 (Eastern (EST))
  - Summer (DST): UTC-4 (EDT)
- ZIP code(s): 49712 (Boyne City)
- Area code: 231
- FIPS code: 26-00480
- GNIS feature ID: 0619851

Advance is an unincorporated community and census-designated place (CDP) in Charlevoix County in the U.S. state of Michigan. The population of the CDP was 340 at the 2020 census. The community is located along Lake Charlevoix within Eveline Township.

== History ==
Advance was settled in Eveline Township as early as 1865 along the shores of Pine Lake (now known as Lake Charlevoix) about 12.0 miles (19.3 km) from Charlevoix. A post office in Advance began operating on October 20, 1870. In 1877, the Grand Rapids and Indiana Railroad opened a depot in Advance, and the community recorded a population of 10 at the time. By 1905, the community recorded a population of 105. The post office was disestablished on October 15, 1906. When the depot closed, the community soon dwindled and recorded 62 residents in 1910.

The community of Advance was listed as a newly defined census designated place for the 2010 census, meaning it now has officially defined boundaries and population statistics for the first time.

== Geography ==
According to the U.S. Census Bureau, the Advance CDP has a total area of 2.75 square miles (7.12 km^{2}), of which 2.72 square miles (7.04 km^{2}) is land and 0.03 square miles (0.08 km^{2}) (1.10%) is water.

== Demographic ==
As of the 2020 US Census, the population of Advance is 340. The median household income of Advance is $93,438. 51.3% of the population of Advance has a Bachelor's Degree or higher. The employment rate for Advance is 48.3%. There are 284 housing units total in Advance with 195 total households. 2.4% of Advance is without healthcare coverage. There are six individuals in Advance of Hispanic or Latino ethnicity.

Historical population
Census	Pop.	Note	%±
2010	328		—
2020	340		3.7%
U.S. Decennial Census

== Education ==
The community of Advance is served primarily by Boyne City Public Schools to the east in Boyne City. A smaller western portion of the community may be served by East Jordan Public Schools to the south in East Jordan.
