= Ironton, Michigan =

- Census-designated place (CDP) & unincorporated community
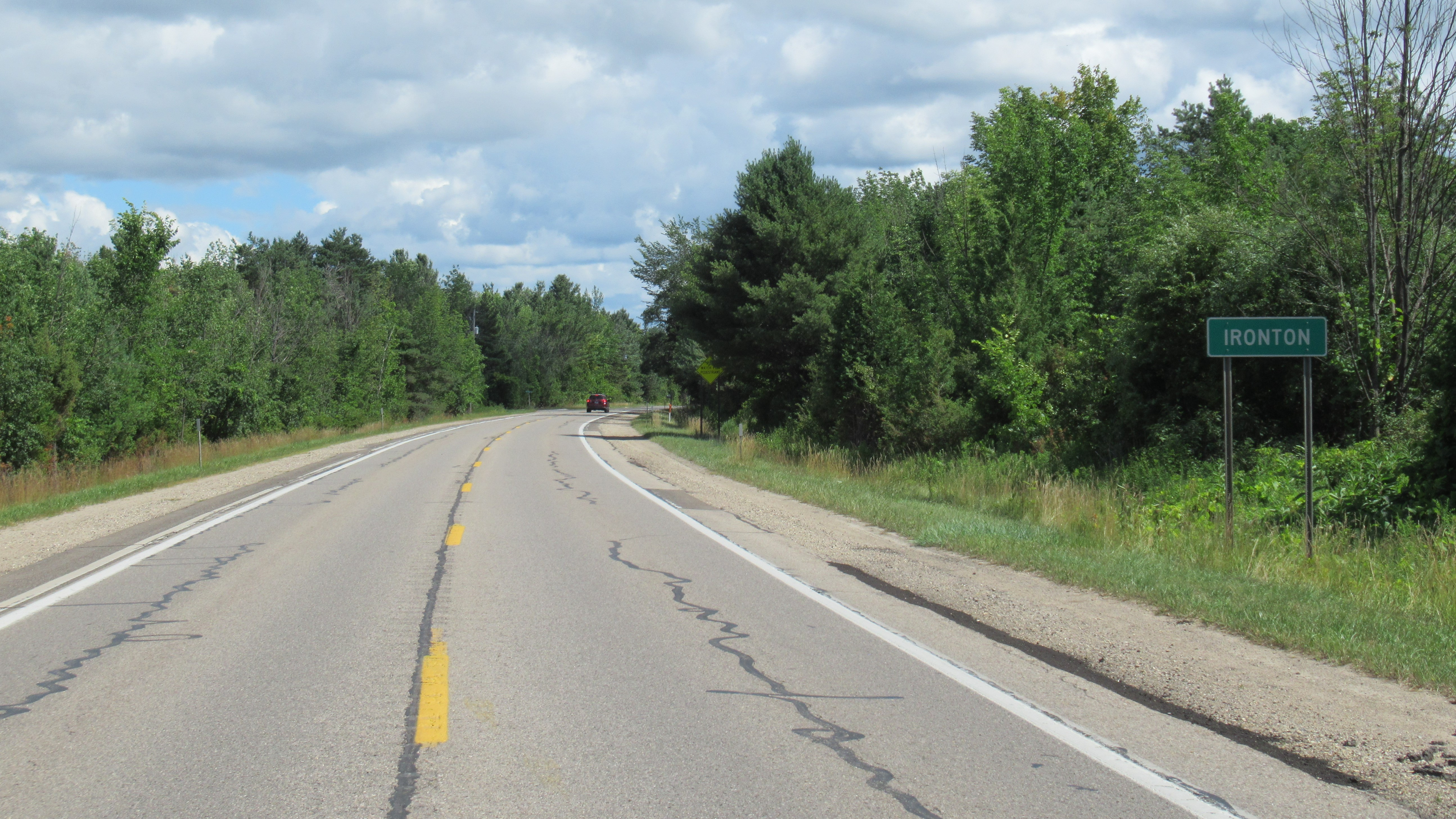
- Road signage along M-66

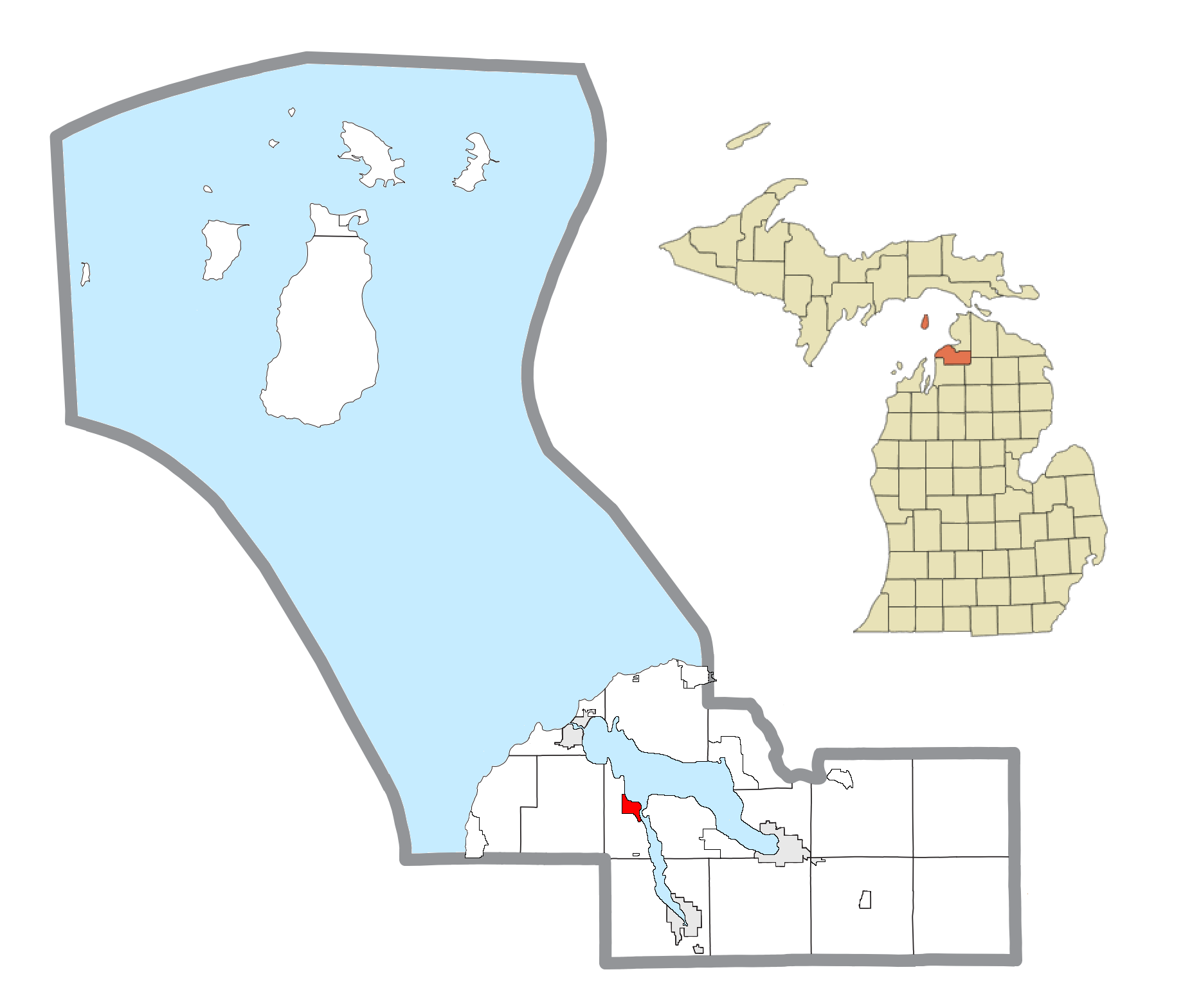
- Location within Charlevoix County

- Location within the state of Michigan Location within the United States
- Coordinates: 45°15′28″N 85°11′26″W
- Country: United States
- State: Michigan
- County: Charlevoix
- Township: Eveline
- Settled: 1879
- Platted: 1884

Area
  - Total: 1.02 sq mi (2.65 km^{2})
  - Land: 1.02 sq mi (2.65 km^{2})
  - Water: 0 sq mi (0.00 km^{2})
- Elevation: 620 ft (190 m)

Population (2020)
  - Total: 148
  - Density: 144.8/sq mi (55.91/km^{2})
- Time zone: UTC-5 (Eastern (EST))
  - Summer (DST): UTC-4 (EDT)
- ZIP code(s): 49720 (Charlevoix); 49727 (East Jordan)
- Area code: 231
- FIPS code: 26-41040
- GNIS feature ID: 0629085

Ironton is an unincorporated community and census-designated place (CDP) in Charlevoix County in the U.S. state of Michigan. The population of the CDP was 148 at the 2020 census. It is located within Eveline Township on a narrow portion of Lake Charlevoix that is traversed by the Ironton Ferry.

== History ==
In 1879, Robert Cherry settled here along the shores of Pine Lake (now known as Lake Charlevoix). Cherry worked for the Pine Lake Iron Company of Chicago and built a plant here that opened in 1881. The plant used iron ore brought in by barges from the Upper Peninsula and turned it into pig iron. A post office opened in Ironton on January 31, 1881, and the community was platted in 1884. The iron operation ultimately failed in 1893, but the community remained. The post office closed on December 30, 1965.

The community of Ironton was listed as a newly-organized census-designated place for the 2010 census, meaning it now has officially defined boundaries and population statistics for the first time.

== Geography ==
According to the U.S. Census Bureau, the Ironton CDP has a total area of 1.02 square miles (2.64 km^{2}), all land.

Ironton is located in the western segment of Eveline Township, which is divided by Lake Charlevoix. The Ironton Ferry within the community connects the two segments of the township along a narrow stretch of the lake.

=== Major highways ===
- M-66 runs south–north through the community.

== Demographics ==
Historical population
Census	Pop.	Note	%±
2010	140		—
2020	148		5.7%
U.S. Decennial Census

== Education ==
Ironton is served primarily by Charlevoix Public Schools to the northwest in Charlevoix, while some southwestern portions of the community may be served by East Jordan Public Schools farther to the south in East Jordan.
