= South Arm =

South Arm may refer to:

- South Arm Township, Michigan
- South Arm, Tasmania

== See also ==
- South Armagh (disambiguation)
