= Holy Island (Lake Charlevoix) =

Island in Michigan, United States

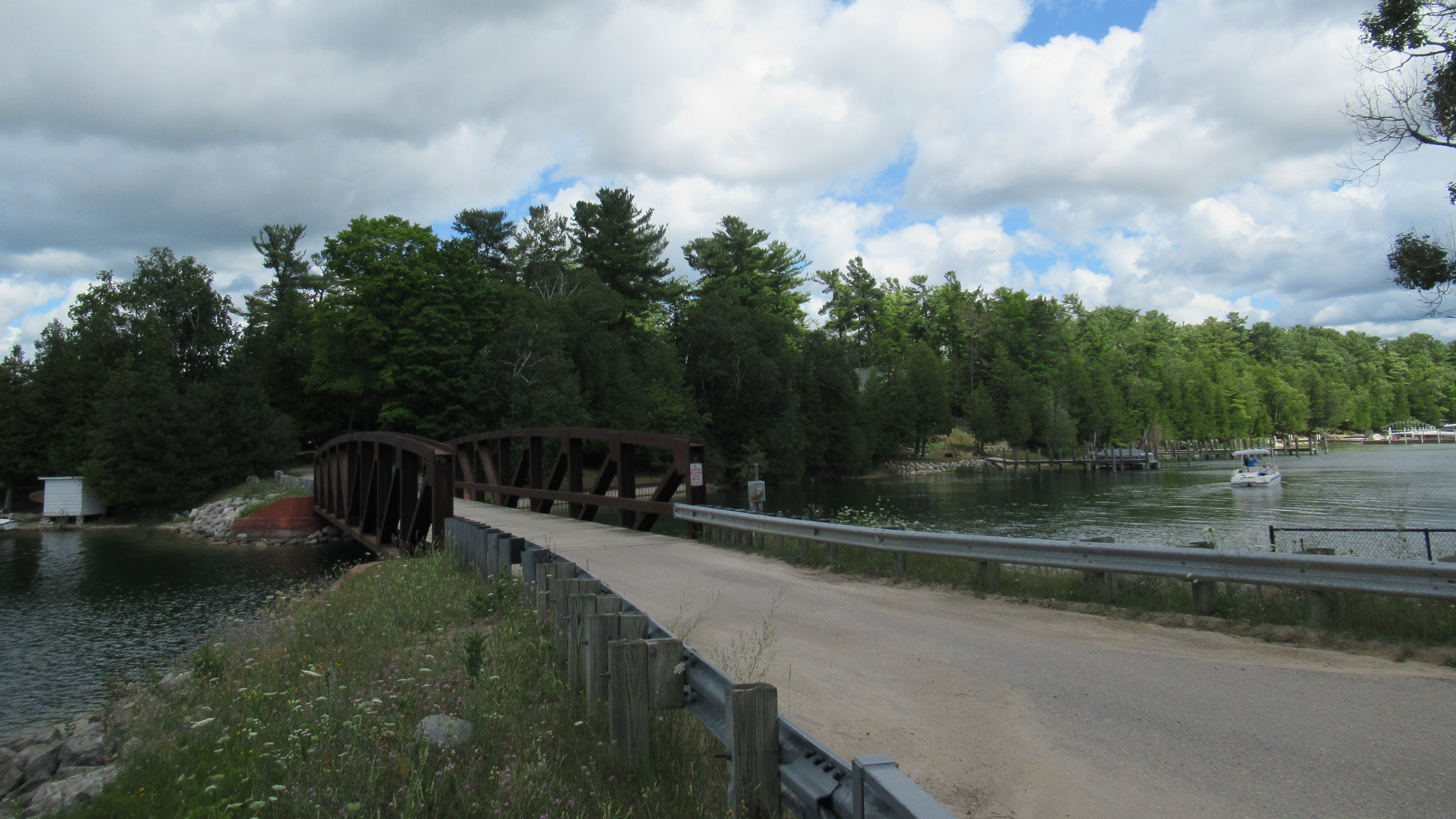
- Bridge crossing to Holy Island

- Location within the state of Michigan

Geography
- Location: Lake Charlevoix
- Coordinates: 45°13′55″N 85°10′00″W
- Area: 11 acres (4.5 ha)
- Highest elevation: 581 ft (177.1 m)

Administration
- United States
- State: Michigan
- County: Charlevoix
- Township: Eveline

Additional information
- Time zone: EST (UTC-5)
  - Summer (DST): EDT (UTC-4)

Holy Island is a populated island located within Lake Charlevoix in the U.S. state of Michigan. The island is part of Eveline Township in Charlevoix County.

== Geography ==
Holy Island is the largest and only named island within Lake Charlevoix, which sits at an elevation of 581 feet (177 m) above sea level. The island is approximately 11 acres (4.5 ha) in size.

== History ==
The island was first settled by Mormon leader James Strang in 1855 at a time when the lake was still referred to as Pine Lake. He used the island for holding the Feast of First Fruits. After he died in 1856, the island transitioned into a popular summer resort.

The island is accessible by a bridge from the mainland along Greenleaf Avenue. The first bridge was constructed as early as 1903 in another location but was moved to connect Holy Island in 1945. This early bridge was eventually replaced entirely in 2009 by a 49.9-foot (15.2 m) long, single lane pony truss bridge that measures 14.1 feet (4.3 m) in width.
