= Young State Park =

State Park in Charlevoix County, Michigan

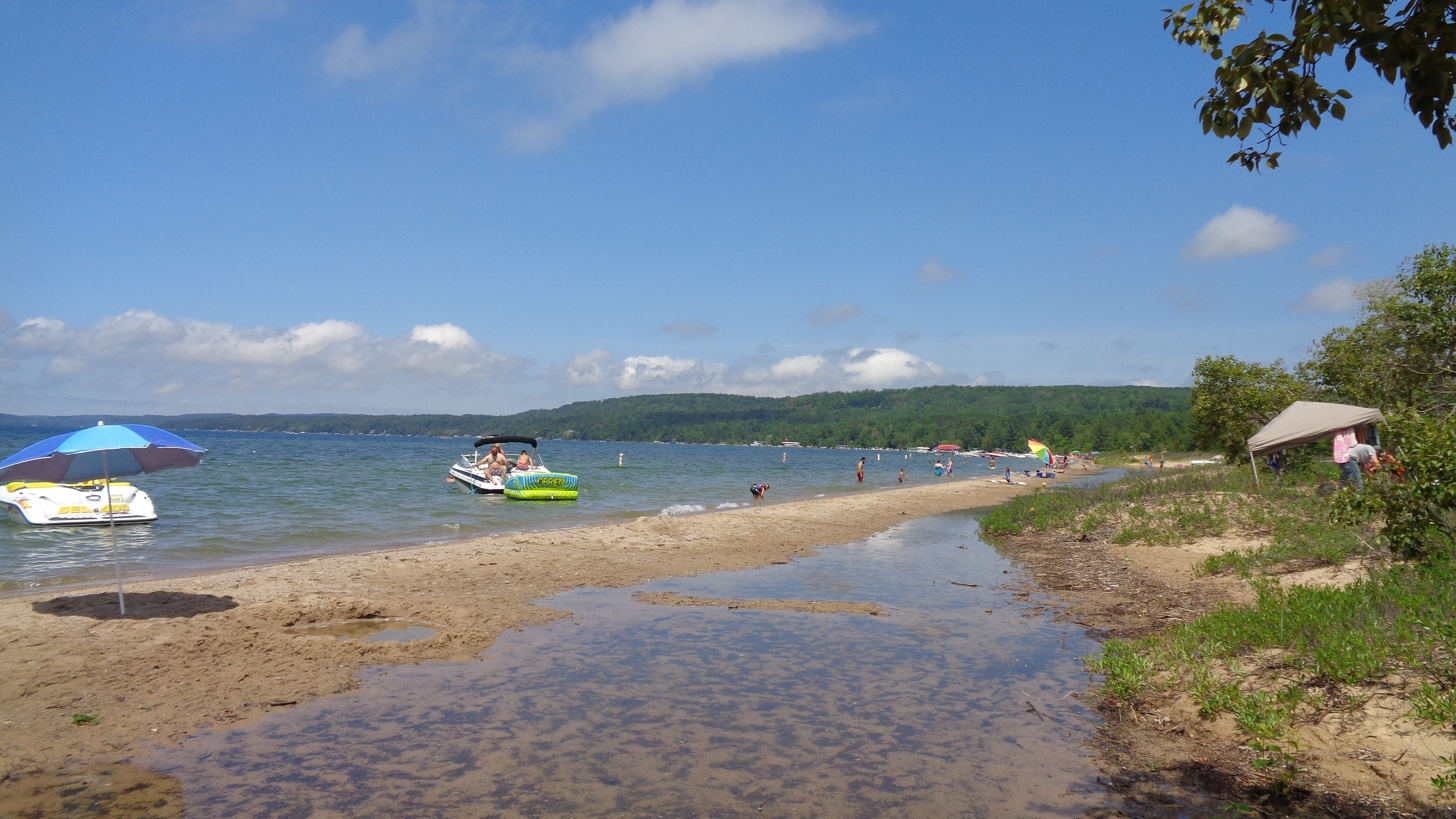
- Beachfront along Lake Charlevoix

- Location within Michigan Location within the United States
- Location: Evangeline Township, Charlevoix County, Michigan, United States
- Nearest city: Boyne City, Michigan
- Coordinates: 45°14′1″N 85°03′44″W
- Area: 563 acres (228 ha)
- Elevation: 581 feet (177 m)
- Established: 1920
- Administrator: Michigan Department of Natural Resources
- Designation: Michigan state park
- Named for: Adolph and Mary Young
- Website: Official website

Young State Park is a public recreation area near Boyne City, Michigan, occupying 563 acres (228 ha) on the eastern shore of 17,260-acre (6,980 ha) Lake Charlevoix in Charlevoix County in the northwest of Northern Michigan.

== History ==
Young State Park was among 13 parks established in 1920 following the creation of the Michigan State Parks Commission a year earlier. The park is named after Adolph and Mary Young, residents of Charlevoix, who donated land for the park's creation. The Civilian Conservation Corps made improvements during the 1930s.

== Activities and amenities ==
The state park offers swimming, picnicking, five miles of hiking trails, cross-country skiing, boat launch, fishing for lake, brown and rainbow trout, and three campgrounds.
