= Marion Township, Charlevoix County, Michigan =

Marion Township, Michigan
- Civil township
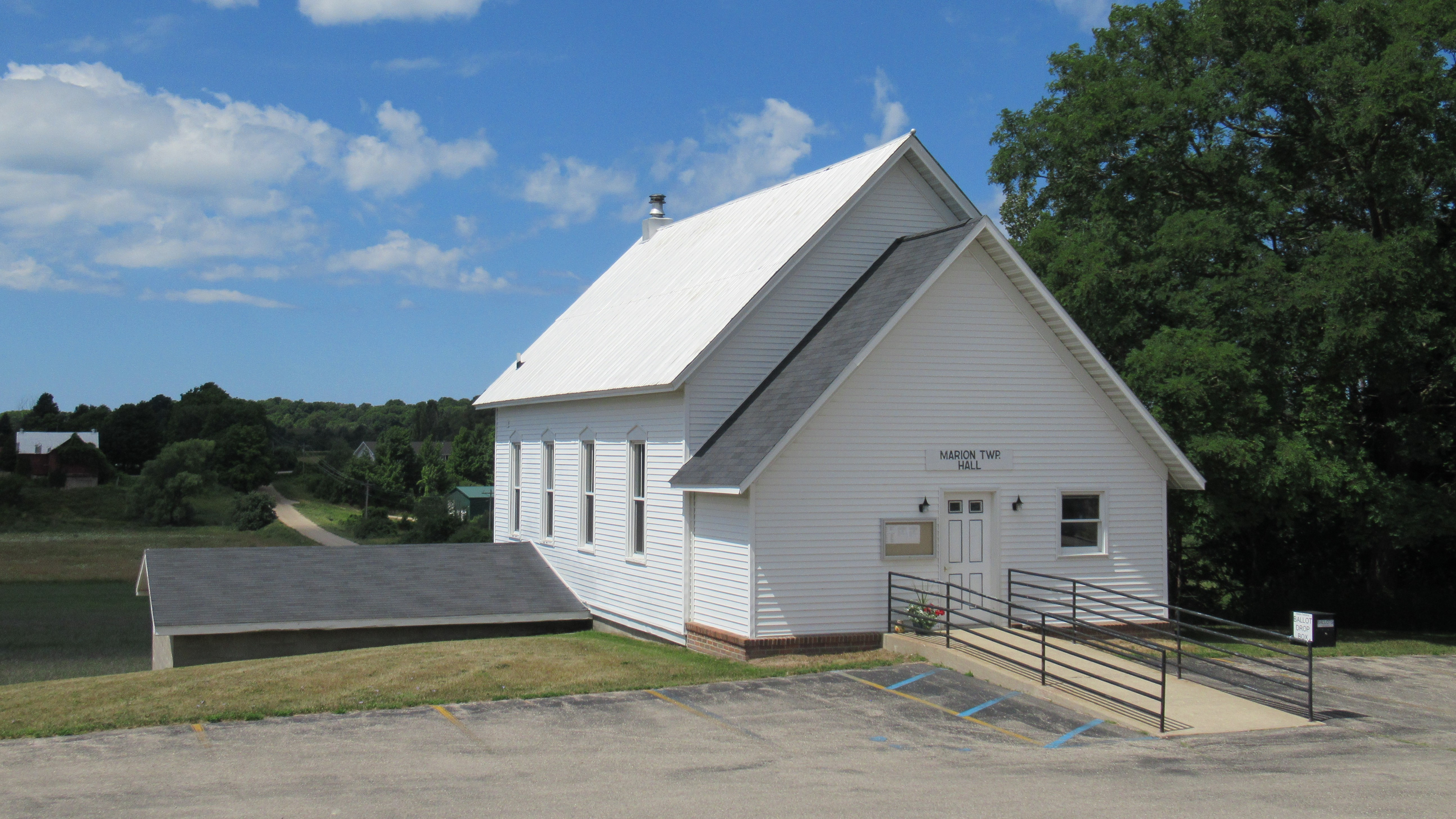
- Marion Township Hall

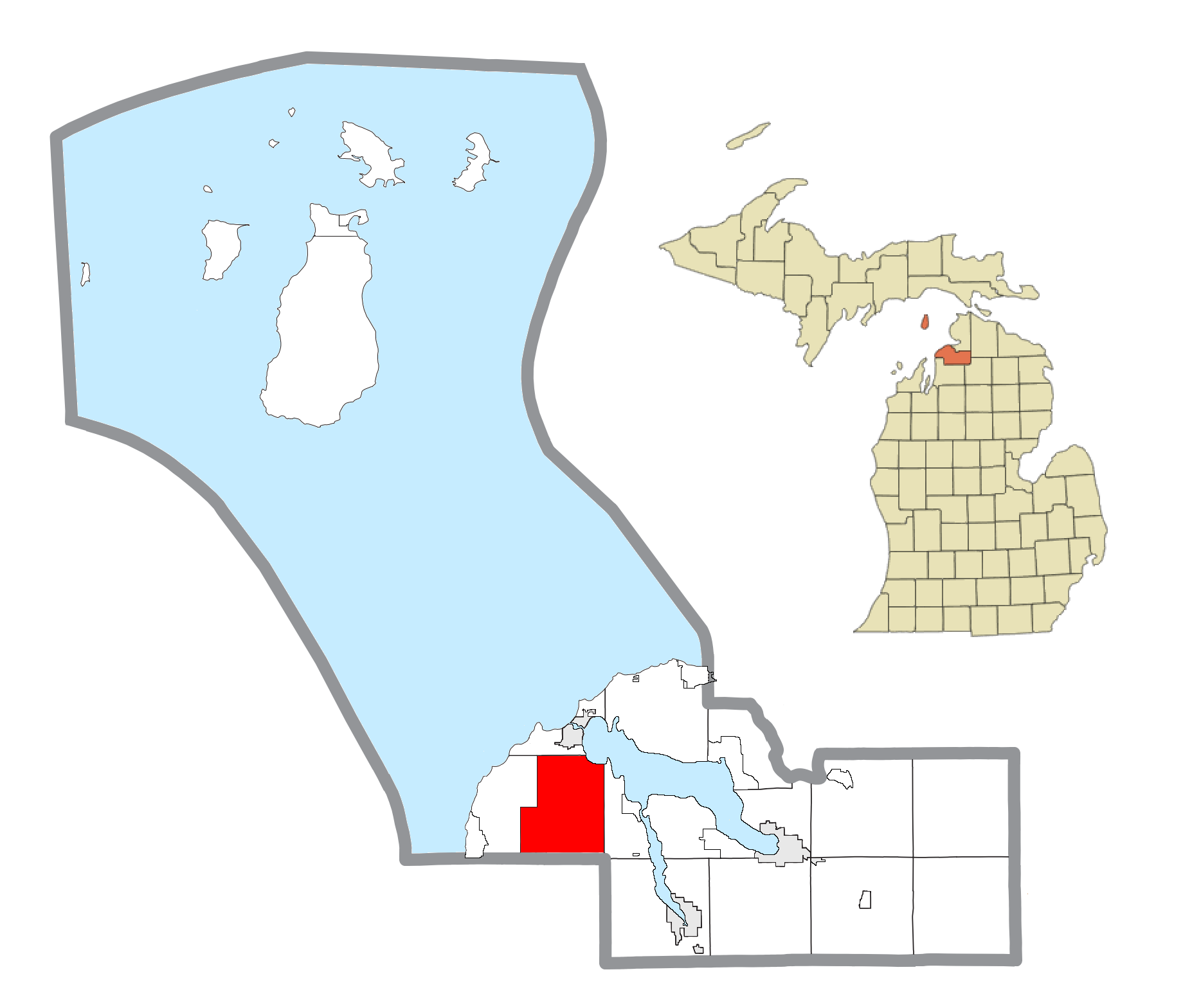
- Location within Charlevoix County

- Location within the state of Michigan Location within the state of Michigan
- Coordinates: 45°15′05″N 85°14′47″W
- Country: United States
- State: Michigan
- County: Charlevoix

Government
  - Supervisor: John Martin
  - Clerk: Timothy Matchett

Area
  - Total: 26.52 sq mi (68.69 km^{2})
  - Land: 25.57 sq mi (66.23 km^{2})
  - Water: 0.95 sq mi (2.46 km^{2})
- Elevation: 827 ft (252 m)

Population (2020)
  - Total: 1,657
  - Density: 64.80/sq mi (25.02/km^{2})
- Time zone: UTC-5 (Eastern (EST))
  - Summer (DST): UTC-4 (EDT)
- ZIP code(s): 49720 (Charlevoix)
- Area code: 231
- FIPS code: 26-51620
- GNIS feature ID: 1626688
- Website: https://www.mariontwpcvxmi.gov/

Marion Township is a civil township of Charlevoix County in the U.S. state of Michigan. The population was 1,657 at the 2020 census.

== Communities ==
- Barnard is an unincorporated community located within the township at 45°15′04″N 85°18′04″W. Location 6.0 miles (9.7 km) south of Charlevoix, it began as early as 1866 when the area was originally part of Emmet County until Charlevoix County was established in 1869. The community had an original population of about 50, and it developed around a sawmill operated by Barnard Burns, who also served as the first postmaster when a post office opened on June 29, 1866. The post office operated until May 2, 1881.
- Cherrie is a former settlement along the Chicago and Western Michigan Railroad that formed around the train station in 1892. Cherrie appeared in Marion Township on a 1911 map of Charlevoix County.
- Phelps is an unincorporated community located within the township at 45°13′15″N 85°15′40″W. The community began with a sawmill and was first called Ballou's Siding. A post office named Phelps opened on April 30, 1900 but is no longer in operation.

== Geography ==
According to the U.S. Census Bureau, the township has a total area of 26.52 square miles (68.69 km^{2}), of which 25.57 square miles (66.23 km^{2}) is land and 0.95 square miles (2.46 km^{2}) (3.58%) is water.

The township has a small northeastern coastline along Lake Charlevoix.

=== Major highways ===
- US 31 enters very briefly in the northwestern corner of the township.
- M-66 runs through the northeast portion of the township near Lake Charlevoix.
- C-65 (Marion Center Road) is a county-designated highway that runs south–north through the center of the township.

== Demographics ==
As of the census of 2000, there were 1,492 people, 535 households, and 418 families residing in the township. The population density was 58.2 inhabitants per square mile (22.5/km^{2}). There were 632 housing units at an average density of 24.7 per square mile (9.5/km^{2}). The racial makeup of the township was 95.44% White, 0.20% African American, 0.74% Native American, 0.13% Asian, 0.47% Pacific Islander, 0.94% from other races, and 2.08% from two or more races. Hispanic or Latino of any race were 2.68% of the population.

There were 535 households, out of which 39.1% had children under the age of 18 living with them, 69.0% were married couples living together, 5.8% had a female householder with no husband present, and 21.7% were non-families. 18.5% of all households were made up of individuals, and 7.9% had someone living alone who was 65 years of age or older. The average household size was 2.76 and the average family size was 3.14.

In the township the population was spread out, with 31.4% under the age of 18, 5.0% from 18 to 24, 28.2% from 25 to 44, 26.1% from 45 to 64, and 9.3% who were 65 years of age or older. The median age was 37 years. For every 100 females, there were 97.9 males. For every 100 females age 18 and over, there were 101.0 males.

The median income for a household in the township was $40,694, and the median income for a family was $45,903. Males had a median income of $35,417 versus $21,905 for females. The per capita income for the township was $16,854. About 5.2% of families and 6.8% of the population were below the poverty line, including 8.2% of those under age 18 and 6.2% of those age 65 or over.

== Education ==
Marion Township is served almost entirely by Charlevoix Public Schools to the north in the city of Charlevoix, while a very small portion of the southern edge of the township is served by Ellsworth Community School in the village of Ellsworth to the south in Antrim County.
