= South Arm Township, Michigan =

- Civil township
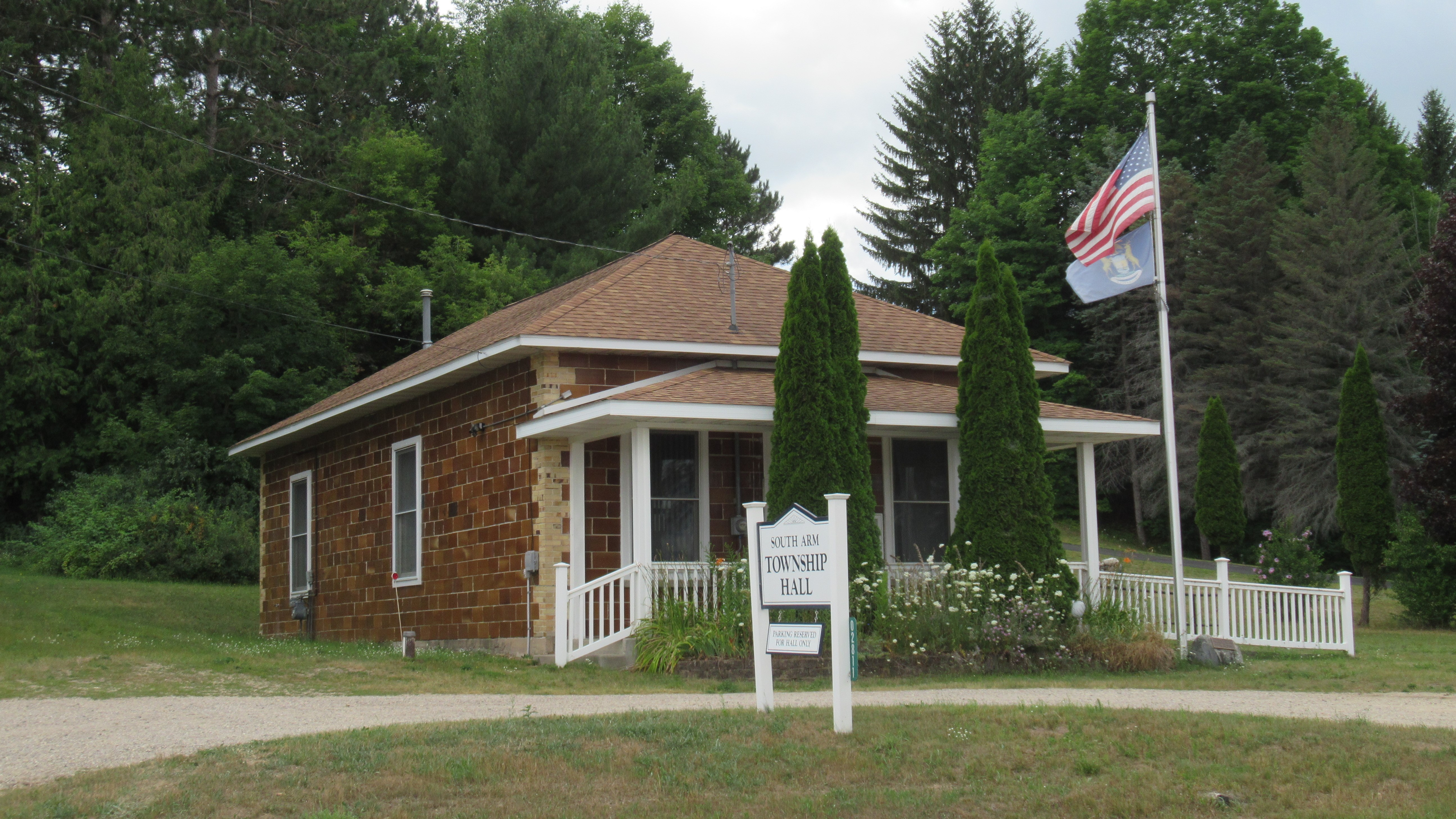
- South Arm Township Hall

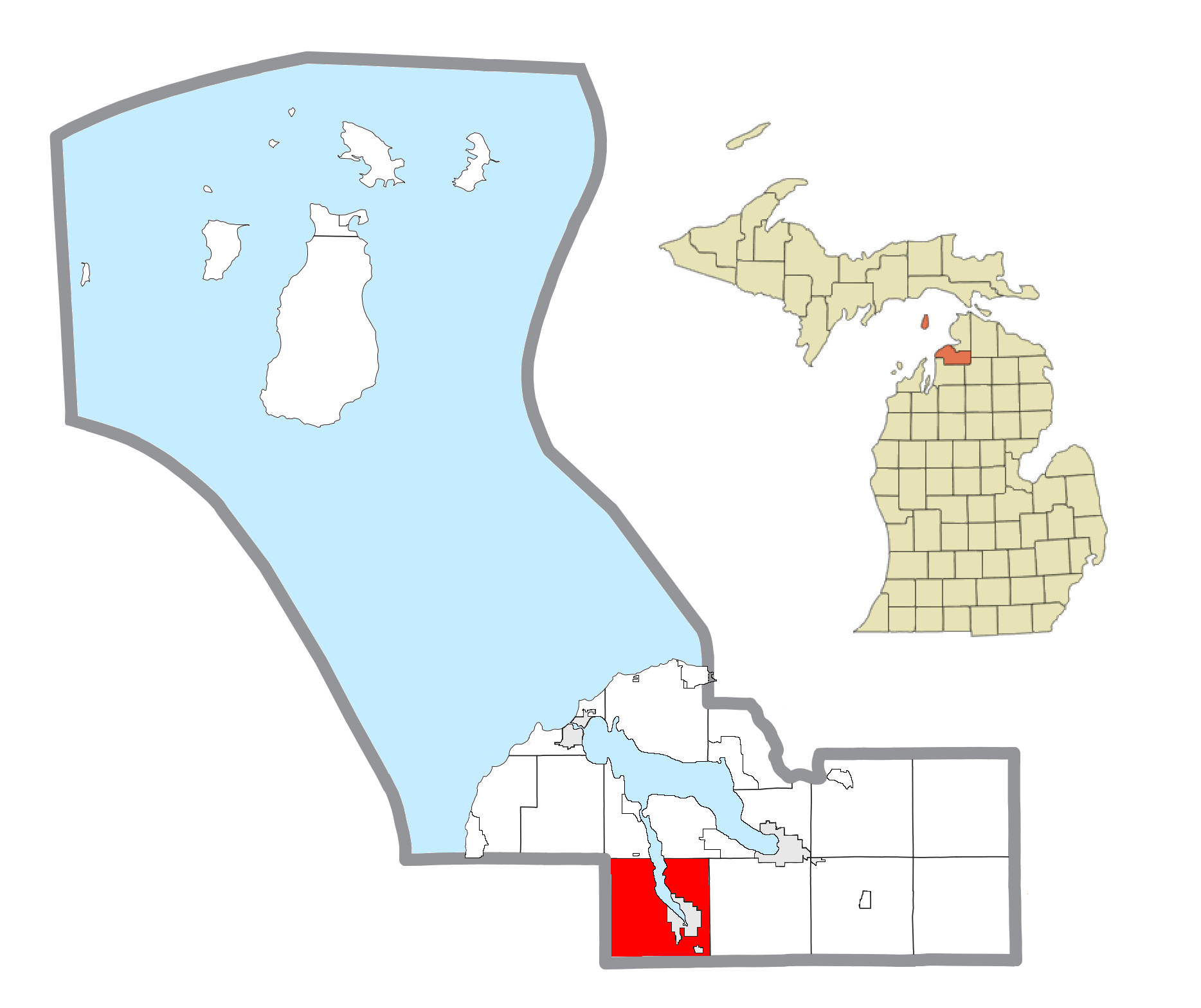
- Location within Charlevoix County

- Location within the state of Michigan
- Coordinates: 45°10′00″N 85°09′18″W
- Country: United States
- State: Michigan
- County: Charlevoix

Government
  - Supervisor: Robert Christensen
  - Clerk: Kimberly Olstrom

Area
  - Total: 32.68 sq mi (84.64 km^{2})
  - Land: 30.64 sq mi (79.36 km^{2})
  - Water: 2.04 sq mi (5.28 km^{2})
- Elevation: 750 ft (230 m)

Population (2020)
  - Total: 1,939
  - Density: 63.28/sq mi (24.43/km^{2})
- Time zone: UTC-5 (Eastern (EST))
  - Summer (DST): UTC-4 (EDT)
- ZIP code(s): 49727 (East Jordan); 49729 (Ellsworth)
- Area code: 231
- FIPS code: 26-74680
- GNIS feature ID: 1627092
- Website: Official website

South Arm Township is a civil township of Charlevoix County in the U.S. state of Michigan. The population was 1,939 at the 2020 census.

== Communities ==
- Dwight was a historic community within the township. It began with a rural post office that opened on May 28, 1866 with local storekeeper DeGrove Haight serving as the first postmaster. The post office operated until July 19, 1898.
- Intermediate is a former settlement located along middle section of the south arm of Pine Lake (now Lake Charlevoix). A post office named Intermediate operated from March 2, 1874 until November 30, 1892.
- Nelsonville is a former community that was settled in Antrim County as early as 1865 by the lumbering firm Nelson, Reddington & Company. When the area became part of the newly-organized Charlevoix County, Nelsonville received a post office on April 26, 1869. The post office closed and was transferred to South Arm on November 23, 1874.
- Sedan was a community within the township that began with a post office that opened on May 31, 1878 just north of East Jordan. The community's name may have derived from the recent Battle of Sedan (1870) of the Franco-Prussian War. The post office operated until February 1, 1883.
- South Arm is a historic settlement within the township. It was named for its location along the south arm of Pine Lake (now Lake Charlevoix). It began when Soloman Isaman purchased 80 acres (32 ha) of land here in 1867. By 1873, he had built his home and a general store, and he became the first postmaster when a post office named South Arm opened on November 23, 1874. In 1877, South Arm was absorbed into the newly incorporated village of East Jordan. The South Arm post office operated until June 30, 1905.

== Geography ==
According to the U.S. Census Bureau, the township has a total area of 32.68 square miles (84.64 km^{2}), of which 30.64 square miles (79.36 km^{2}) is land and 2.04 square miles (5.28 km^{2}) (6.24) is water.

The township contains a coastline along the southern arm of Lake Charlevoix.

=== Major highways ===
- M-32 (Maple Street) enters the township briefly in the southeast portion of the township and terminates in the city of East Jordan.
- M-66 runs along the coast of Lake Charlevoix and through East Jordan.
- C-48 is a county-designated highway that runs west–east through the center portion of the township.

== Demographics ==
As of the census of 2000, there were 1,844 people, 670 households, and 517 families residing in the township. The population density was 60.0 inhabitants per square mile (23.2/km^{2}). There were 947 housing units at an average density of 30.8 per square mile (11.9/km^{2}). The racial makeup of the township was 96.10% White, 1.68% Native American, 0.11% Asian, 1.25% from other races, and 0.87% from two or more races. Hispanic or Latino of any race were 1.63% of the population.

There were 670 households, out of which 33.6% had children under the age of 18 living with them, 69.0% were married couples living together, 4.6% had a female householder with no husband present, and 22.7% were non-families. 18.7% of all households were made up of individuals, and 8.5% had someone living alone who was 65 years of age or older. The average household size was 2.60 and the average family size was 2.96.

In the township the population was spread out, with 25.1% under the age of 18, 5.3% from 18 to 24, 26.5% from 25 to 44, 26.5% from 45 to 64, and 16.7% who were 65 years of age or older. The median age was 41 years. For every 100 females, there were 97.4 males. For every 100 females age 18 and over, there were 93.8 males.

The median income for a household in the township was $42,159, and the median income for a family was $48,438. Males had a median income of $31,964 versus $25,096 for females. The per capita income for the township was $17,554. About 3.5% of families and 4.8% of the population were below the poverty line, including 4.3% of those under age 18 and 6.3% of those age 65 or over.

== Education ==
South Arm Township is served by two separate public school districts. The vast majority of the township is served by East Jordan Public Schools within the city of East Jordan. A small portion of the southwest corner of the township is served by Ellsworth Community School to the west in the village of Ellsworth in Antrim County.
