= Boyne City Public Schools =

School district in Michigan, United States

Address
- 321 South Park Street Boyne City, Charlevoix County, Michigan, 49712; United States

District information
- Motto: Excellence in Academics, Arts and Athletics
- Grades: Pre-Kindergarten-12
- Superintendent: Patrick Little
- Schools: 4
- Budget: $30,556,000 2021-2022 expenditures
- NCES District ID: 2606500

Students and staff
- Students: 1,220 (2024-2025)
- Teachers: 82.23 (on an FTE basis) (2024-2025)
- Staff: 159.42 FTE (2024-2025)
- Student–teacher ratio: 14.84 (2024-2025)

Other information
- Website: www.boyne.k12.mi.us

Boyne City Public Schools is a public school district in Northern Michigan. In Charlevoix County, it serves Boyne City, Bay Township, Evangeline Township, and parts of the townships of Boyne Valley, Eveline, Hayes, Melrose, and Wilson. In Antrim County, it serves parts of Jordan Township and Warner Township.

== History ==
A public school district was established in Boyne City around 1870, and a series of small log and frame buildings were the first schools. In 1883, a brick school was built.

A 1903 newspaper article illustrates a new high school building, planned to be completed that fall. The building shown had two stories and a basement, a hipped roof topped by a cupola, and a prominent bell tower. The high school was damaged by fire in 1961 as the new high school was under construction. Classes quickly resumed at the old high school before the new high school opened in fall 1961.

The former Morgan-Shaw School was built in 1914 at the corner of Pleasant Avenue and Morgan Street. The board voted to sell it in 1979.

The Boyne City district merged with the East Jordan school district in 1968, forming Twin Valley School District. The intention was to combine resources to construct a new high school, but disagreements over which city to build the high school resulted in failed bond issue elections and no funds could be raised. By 1975, the high schools in East Jordan and Boyne City had received two warnings from the North Central Association, their accrediting organization, that they were at risk of losing accreditation because both were operating on half-day schedules with the middle schools as a way to alleviate overcrowding. Part of the district's improvement plan was to demerge. Voters approved the demerger on January 3, 1977. Despite the demerger, Boyne City High School lost is accreditation in 1977, and it was not returned until March 1985.

Five months after voting to demerge, the community approved a bond issue to build a new elementary school and renovate the former elementary school to become a middle school. Additions at the high school were also planned. The schools were ready for the 1978-1979 school year, and half-day sessions were ended.

In 1996, improvements were made to the football stadium complex through community fundraising and volunteer labor.

Construction of the current high school began in 2000 for a planned completion in fall 2002. The architect was BETA Design Group. Renovations were also undertaken at other districts buildings, and the former high school became the middle school.

== Schools ==
Schools in Boyne City Public Schools district
| School | Address | Notes |
|---|---|---|
| Boyne City High School | 1035 Boyne Ave., Boyne City | Grades 9–12. Built 2002. |
| Boyne City Middle School | 1025 Boyne Ave., Boyne City | Grades 5–8. Built 1961. |
| Boyne City Elementary School | 930 Brockway, Boyne City | Grades K-4. Built 1978. |
| Early Learners Program | 321 S. Park St., Boyne City | Preschool |
| Morgan-Shaw School | 321 South Park St., Boyne City | Alternative/online high school |
