= Charlevoix Public Schools =

School district in Michigan

Address
- 104 E. St. Mary's Drive Charlevoix, Charlevoix County, Michigan, 49720; United States

District information
- Grades: PreKindergarten–12
- Superintendent: Mike Ritter
- Schools: 2
- Budget: $14,689,000 2021-2022 expenditures
- NCES District ID: 2608730

Students and staff
- Students: 786 (2024-2025)
- Teachers: 57.56 (on an FTE basis) (2024-2025)
- Staff: 113.29 FTE (2024-2025)
- Student–teacher ratio: 13.66 (2024-2025)
- District mascot: Rayders

Other information
- Website: www.rayder.net

Charlevoix Public Schools is a public school district in Northern Michigan. In Charlevoix County, it serves Charlevoix, the townships of Charlevoix and Norwood, and parts of the townships of Eveline, Hayes, and Marion. In Antrim County, it serves part of Banks Township.

== History ==
The first school in Charlevoix was a log structure built in 1861. New schools were built in 1868 and 1873. A fire destroyed the 1873 school in 1889 and it was rebuilt in 1890. Elementary schools were built on both sides of town in 1895.

In 1902, a new Charlevoix High School was built on Mason Street near Grant Street next to the 1890 school. It was also known as McKinley High School, named after U.S. President William McKinley. In 1903, a normal school, or teacher training school, was established within the school that gave post-secondary students experience teaching in rural schools.

A new school was built in 1928 on Grant Street, and the 1890 school was then used for storage until 1945, when it was demolished. The Grant Street school contained the high school until 1961, then continued to house the elementary school, and then became a middle school in fall 1969. Architecture firm Warren Holmes, Powers Company of Lansing designed the building. It became the city's public library in September 2006. The old kindergarten room of the school, now the Belvidere Room of the library, featured a round brick fish pond. The teacher kept dry clothes for any student who fell in.

Ray Kipke served as the high school football coach between 1928 and 1949, and his last five teams were undefeated. The high school mascot, the Raiders, was renamed the Rayders in his honor.

The current Charlevoix Elementary was originally the junior/senior high school, opened in fall 1961. The 1902 high school was then torn down. Eight years later, a new elementary school opened on Division Avenue.

The current middle/high school opened in fall 2002. BETA Design Group was the architect. It was funded by a 1999 bond issue that also funded conversion of the former middle/high school into a dedicated middle school and renovation of the elementary school.

In fall 2013, students in grades seven and eight joined the high school and the building became Charlevoix Middle/High School. The closed middle school became Round Lake Educational Center, a multipurpose building, but a bond issue passed in 2017 to rebuild much of the building to become Charlevoix Elementary. The new Charlevoix Elementary opened in January 2020.

== Schools ==
Schools in Charlevoix Public Schools district
School	Address	Notes
Charlevoix Middle/High School	5200 Marion Center Road, Charlevoix	Grades 7–12. Built 2002.
Charlevoix Elementary	108 E. Garfield, Charlevoix	Grades PreK-6. Built 1961, substantially rebuilt in 2020.
