= Evangeline Township, Michigan =

- Civil township
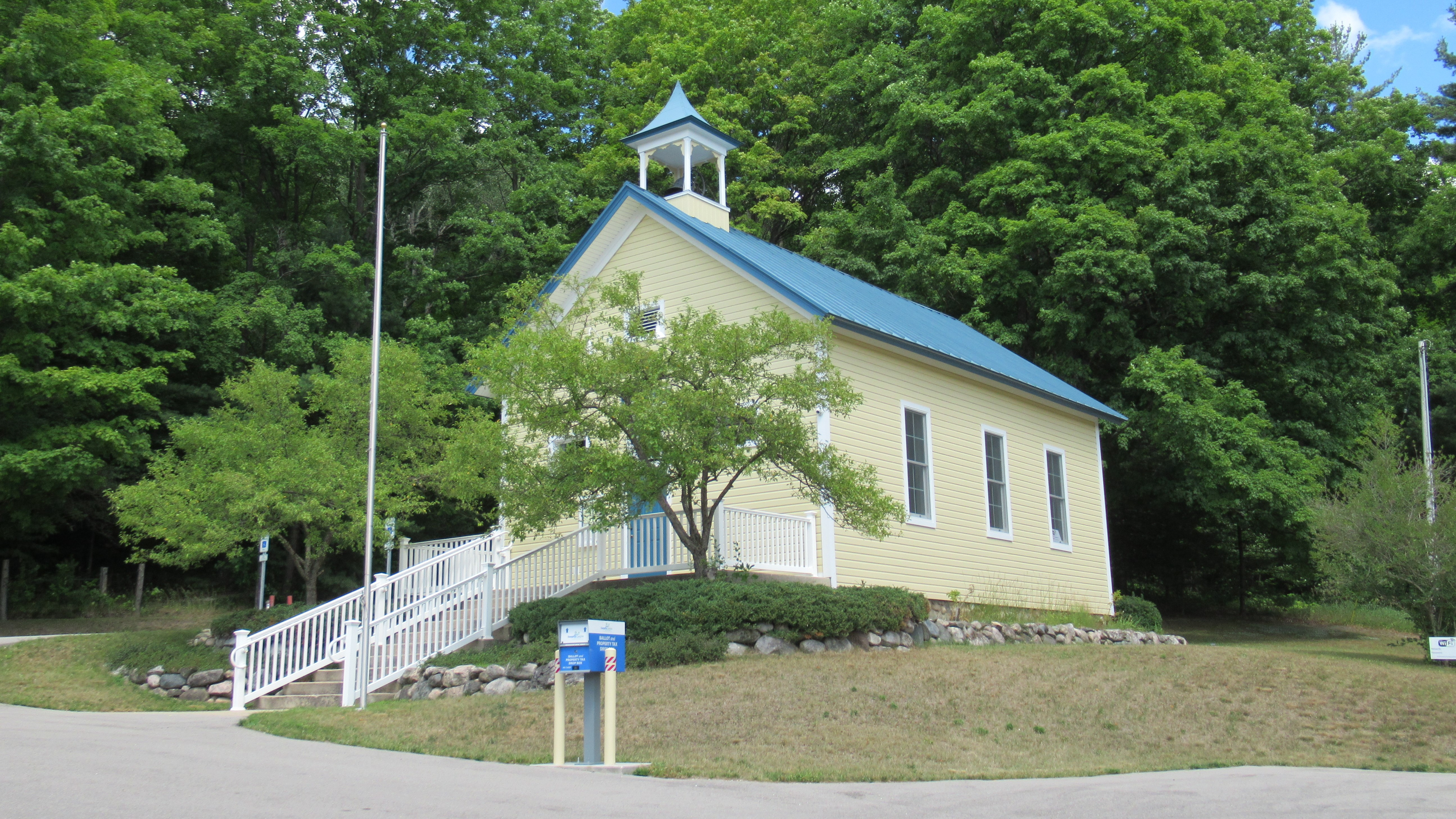
- Evangeline Township Hall

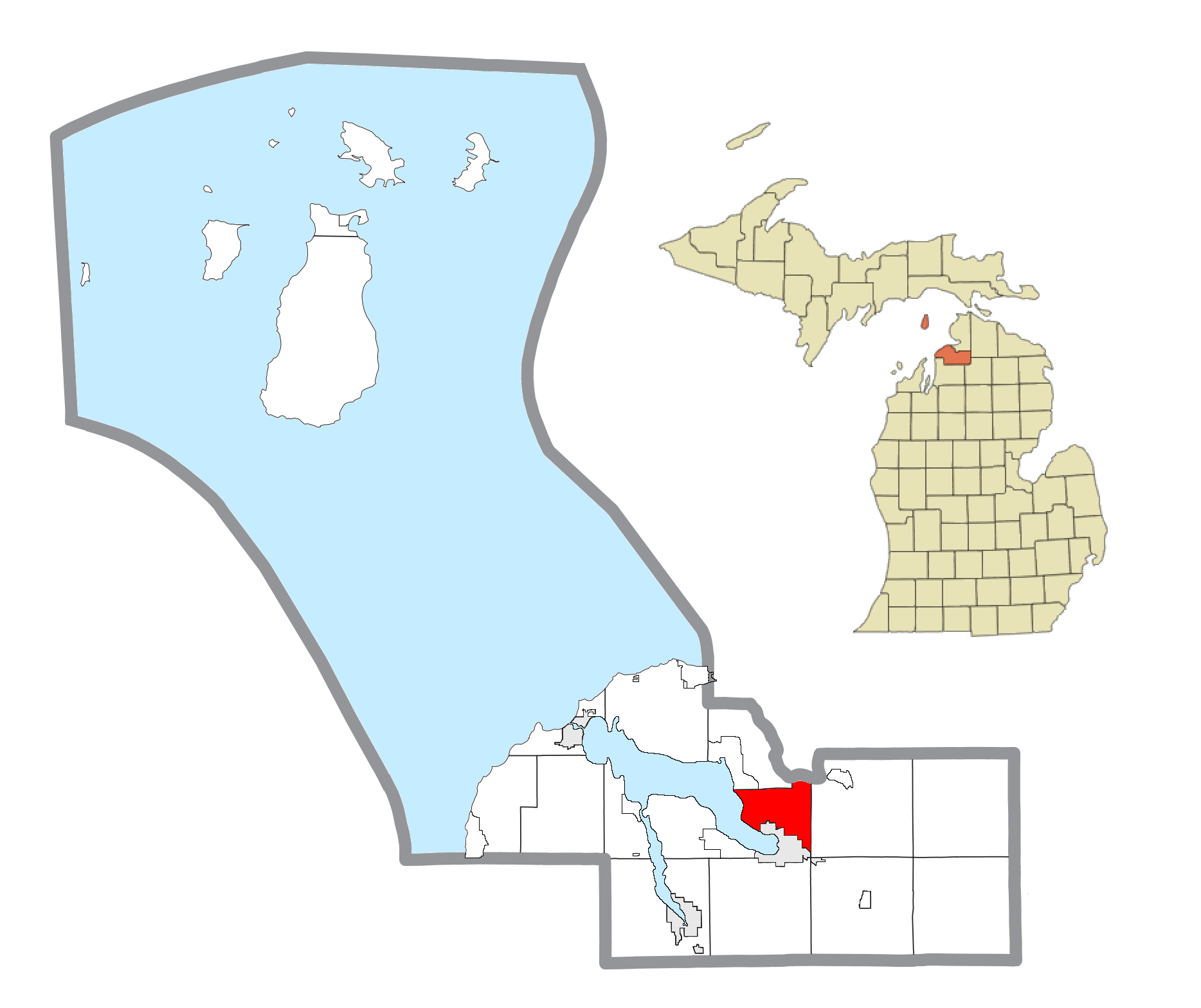
- Location within Charlevoix County

- Location within the state of Michigan Location within the United States
- Coordinates: 45°15′08″N 85°01′29″W
- Country: United States
- State: Michigan
- County: Charlevoix

Government
  - Supervisor: James Howell
  - Clerk: Evelyn Howell

Area
  - Total: 14.73 sq mi (38.15 km^{2})
  - Land: 11.02 sq mi (28.54 km^{2})
  - Water: 3.71 sq mi (9.61 km^{2})
- Elevation: 950 ft (290 m)

Population (2020)
  - Total: 767
  - Density: 69.6/sq mi (26.9/km^{2})
- Time zone: UTC-5 (Eastern (EST))
  - Summer (DST): UTC-4 (EDT)
- ZIP code(s): 49712 (Boyne City)
- Area code: 231
- FIPS code: 26-26580
- GNIS feature ID: 1626252
- Website: Official website

Evangeline Township is a civil township of Charlevoix County in the U.S. state of Michigan. The population was 767 at the 2020 census.

== Communities ==
- Bay Springs is a historic settlement that was located at the mouth of the Boyne River at the beginning of Lake Charlevoix. It was settled as a resort colony in 1882 and had its own post office from October 3, 1884 until July 15, 1905.
- Wildwood is an unincorporated community located within the township at 45°15′55″N 85°00′08″W.

== History ==
Evangeline Township takes its name from the epic poem Evangeline by Henry Wadsworth Longfellow.

== Geography ==
According to the U.S. Census Bureau, the township has a total area of 14.73 square miles (38.15 km^{2}), of which 11.02 square miles (28.54 km^{2}) is land and 3.71 square miles (9.61 km^{2}) (25.19%) is water.

The township occupies water boundaries in Lake Charlevoix and Walloon Lake. Young State Park is in the southwest part of the township along Lake Charlevoix.

=== Major highways ===
- M-75 enters the township briefly in the southeast corner and runs into Boyne City.
- C-56 (Boyne City–Charlevoix Road) runs through the western portion of the township near Lake Charlevoix.

== Demographics ==
As of the census of 2000, there were 773 people, 298 households, and 225 families residing in the township. The population density was 70.3 inhabitants per square mile (27.1/km^{2}). There were 487 housing units at an average density of 44.3 per square mile (17.1/km^{2}). The racial makeup of the township was 98.45% White, 0.13% African American, 0.52% Native American, 0.13% from other races, and 0.78% from two or more races. Hispanic or Latino of any race were 0.52% of the population.

There were 298 households, out of which 34.2% had children under the age of 18 living with them, 66.8% were married couples living together, 4.4% had a female householder with no husband present, and 24.2% were non-families. 20.5% of all households were made up of individuals, and 10.4% had someone living alone who was 65 years of age or older. The average household size was 2.59 and the average family size was 3.00.

In the township the population was spread out, with 26.1% under the age of 18, 5.2% from 18 to 24, 23.4% from 25 to 44, 30.8% from 45 to 64, and 14.5% who were 65 years of age or older. The median age was 42 years. For every 100 females, there were 97.7 males. For every 100 females age 18 and over, there were 96.9 males.

The median income for a household in the township was $46,250, and the median income for a family was $52,115. Males had a median income of $33,523 versus $22,969 for females. The per capita income for the township was $28,279. About 4.5% of families and 4.4% of the population were below the poverty line, including 6.3% of those under age 18 and 1.9% of those age 65 or over.

== Education ==
Evangeline Township is served entirely by Boyne City Public Schools to the south in the city of Boyne City.
