= Ironton Ferry =

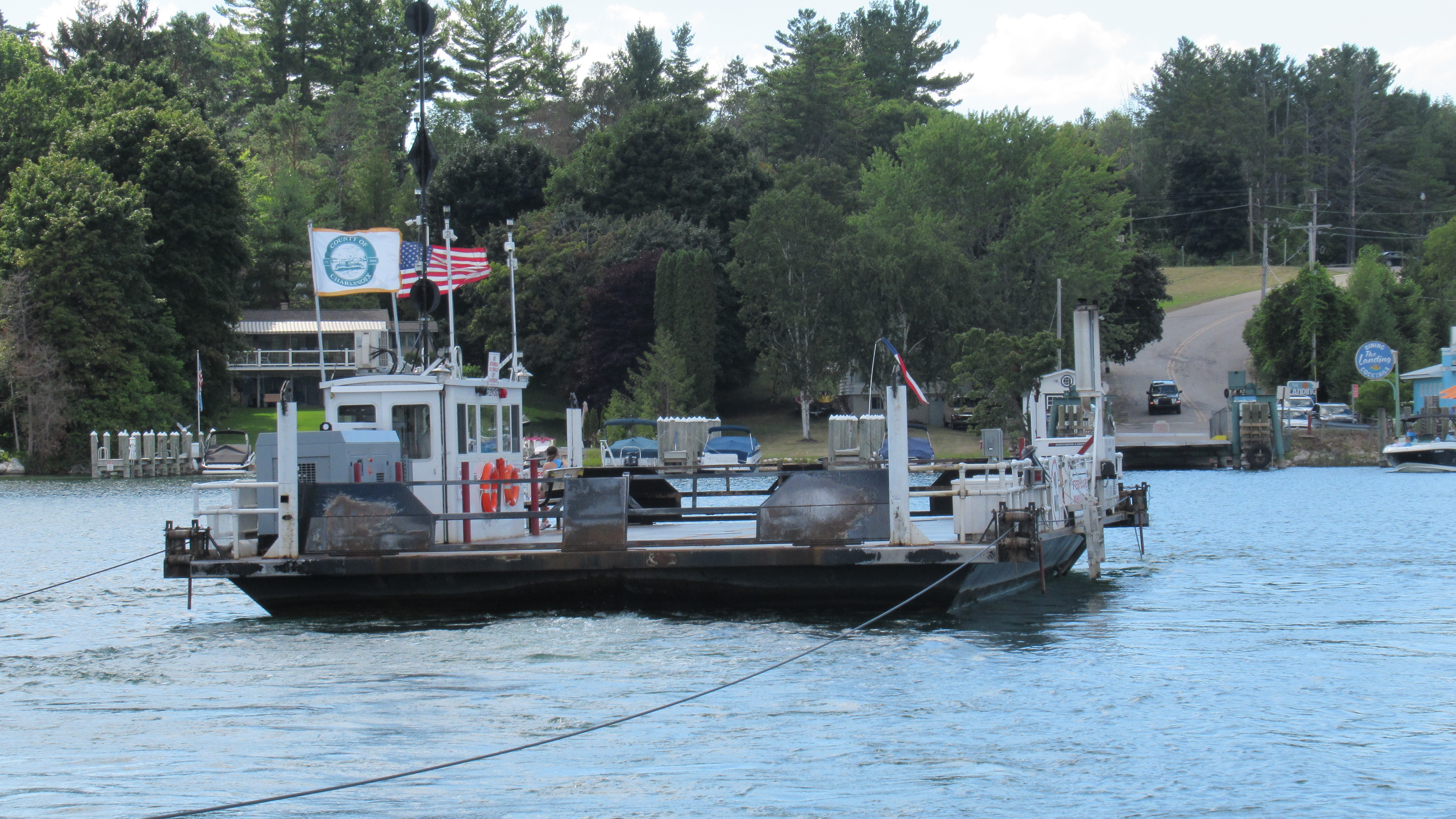
- Locale: Eveline Township, Michigan
- Waterway: Lake Charlevoix
- Transit type: Cable ferry Pedestrian and automobile
- Owner: Charlevoix County
- Began operation: 1876
- No. of vessels: 1: Vessel Charlevoix
- Website: Official website

Ironton Ferry
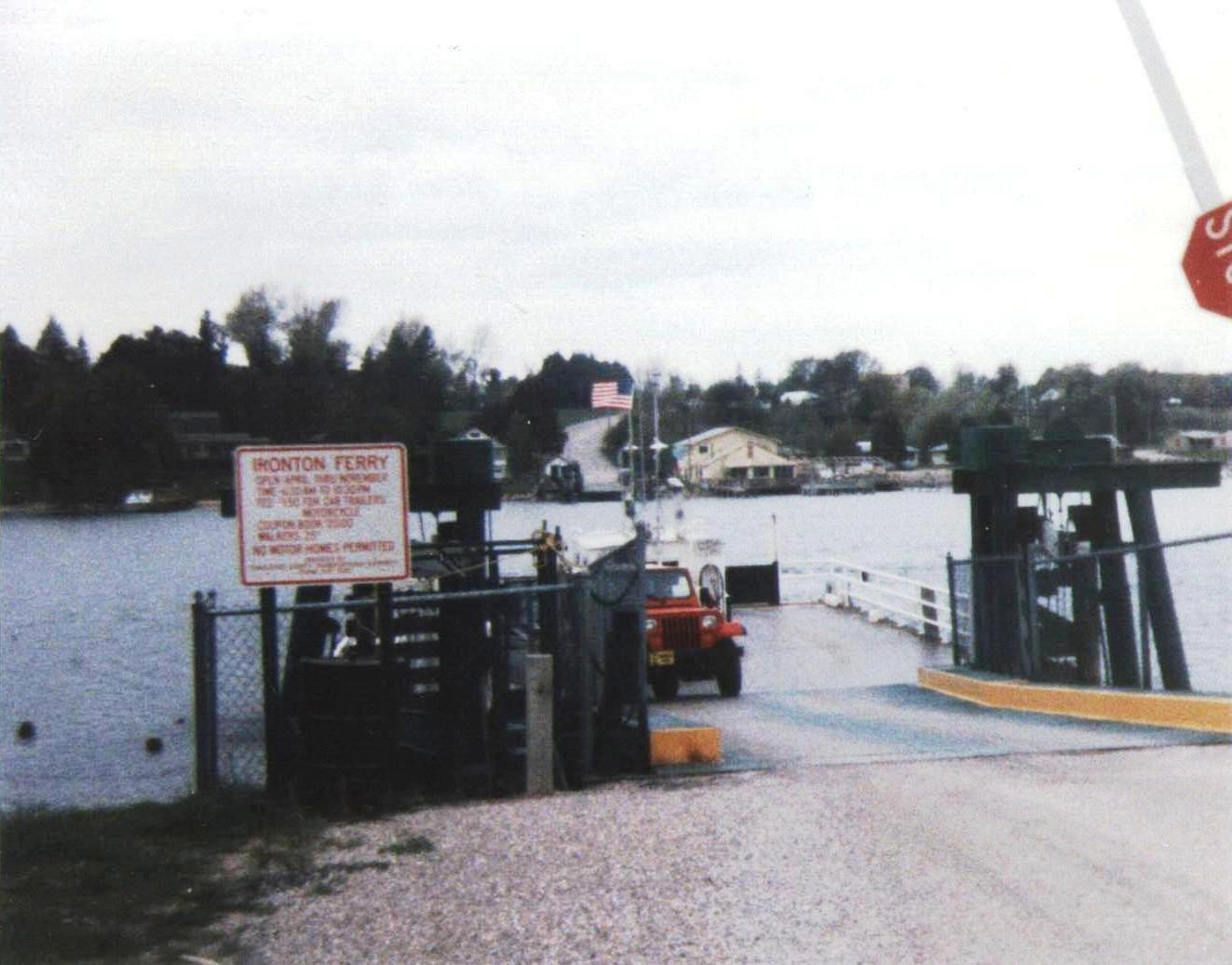
- Ironton Ferry in 1990

- Location within Michigan
- 45°15′22″N 85°11′06″W
- Location: 10122 Ferry Road; Charlevoix, Michigan

History
- Built: 1876

Michigan State Historic Site
- Designated: June 18, 1976

Ironton Ferry is a four-car cable ferry that crosses a narrow point on the South Arm of Lake Charlevoix in the U.S. state of Michigan in the unincorporated community of Ironton. The ferry connects Ironton, located about five miles (8.0 km) from Charlevoix, to Boyne City.

The ferry runs between April and November. The automobile fare has risen to $5.00 each way.

== History ==
The Ironton ferry began operation in 1876. At first, the operator took individual passengers across Lake Charlevoix in a rowboat. After about four years, the rowboat was replaced by a ferry that was powered by horses. Ironton became a pig iron factory town when the Pine Lake Iron Co. opened in 1879.

== In popular culture ==
=== Hemingway references ===
Ironton is directly across from a parcel of land once owned by George R. Hemingway, uncle of renowned author Ernest Hemingway. While Hemingway spent summers at his parents' cottage in Walloon Lake from 1900 to the 1920s, he also spent time near Horton Bay and across Lake Charlevoix at the tree farm of his Uncle George. This tree farm on Lake Charlevoix was at the south landing of the ferry and is known as Hemingway Point. In Hemingway's The Nick Adams Stories, the Hemingway point is where Nick was camping when he became frightened and fired rifle shots to signal his father and uncle who were out on the lake. This was confirmed by the author's first cousin, Margaret Hemingway Bundy, prior to her death.

=== Ripley's Believe it or Not ===
The ferry acquired nationwide fame in 1936, when Ripley's Believe it or Not! listed Ironton Ferry Captain Sam Alexander for travelling 15,000 miles (24,000 km) while never being more than 1,000 feet (300 m) from his home. Alexander piloted the ferry from 1900 until his death in 1948.

=== Other art ===
There is a more recent collection of short stories about life in the area during the 1970s. My Summers On Hemingway Road, by Alicia Hein Cook, features original artwork of the Ironton Ferry on the cover.

The Ironton Ferry has been captured by many artists, both amateur and professional. Among these are Leland Beaman, an accomplished Michigan artist, who painted the Ironton Ferry in watercolor prior to the landing and onboard gates being electrified in the late 1970s.
