= Eveline Township, Michigan =

- Civil township
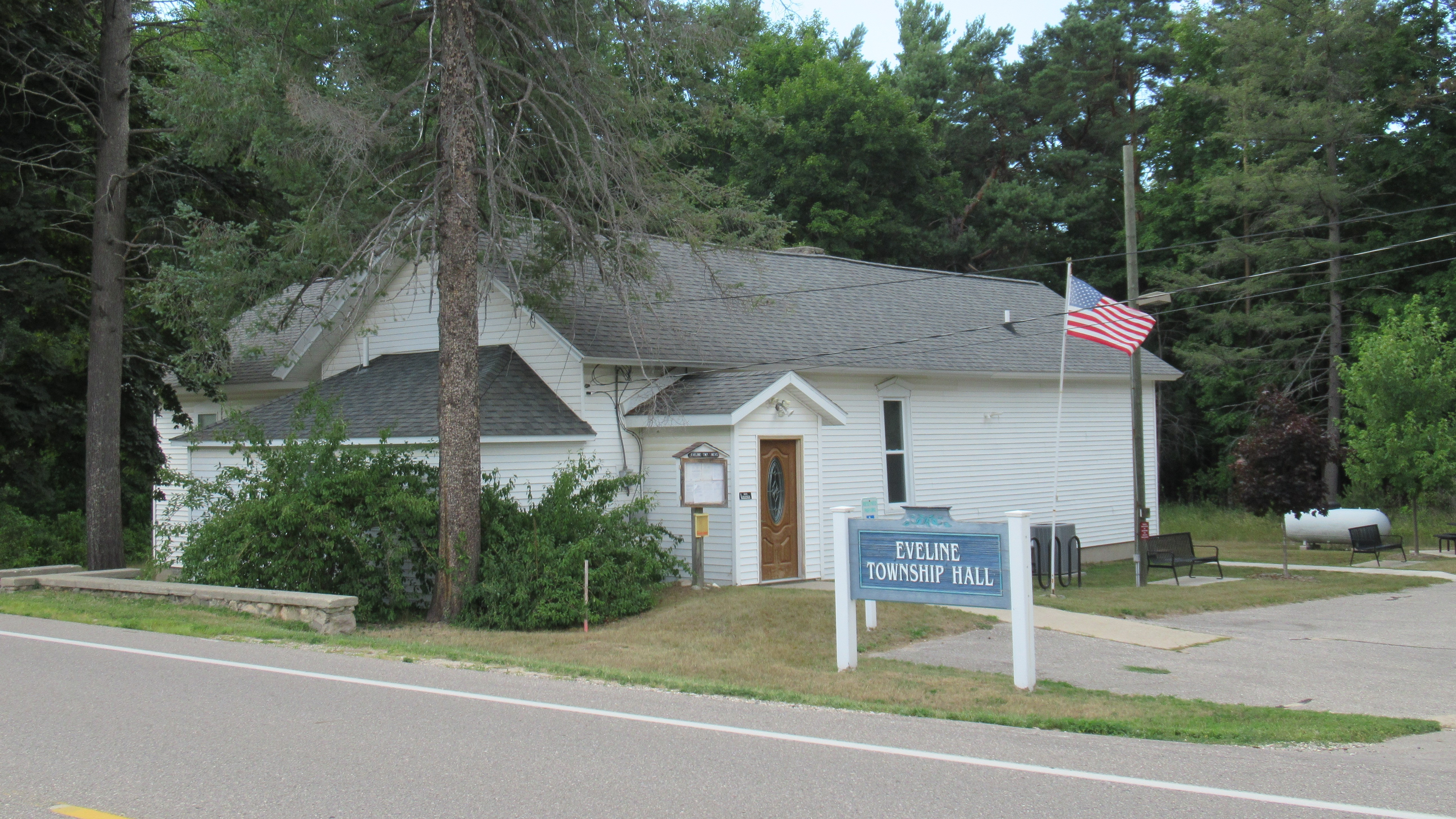
- Eveline Township Hall

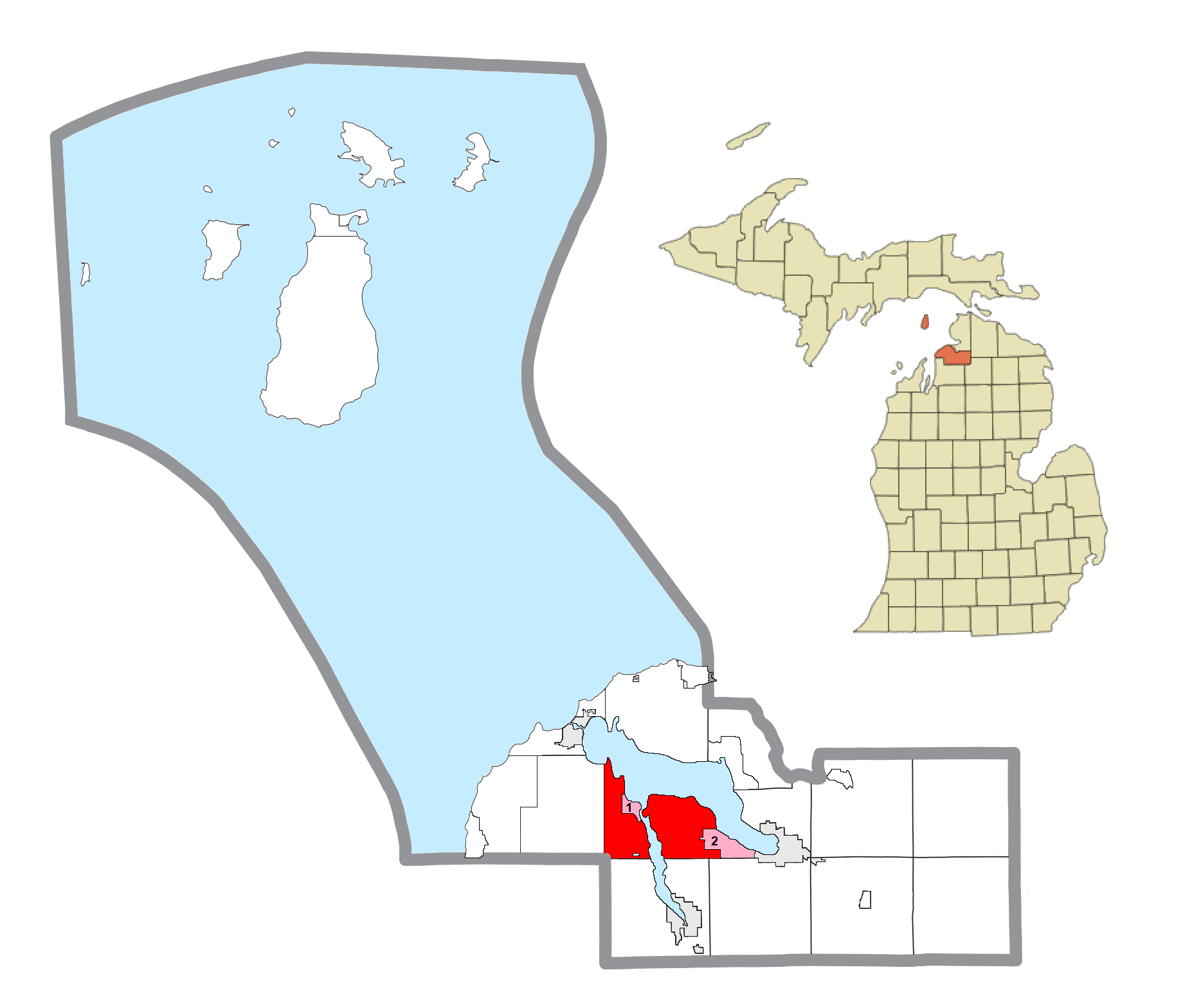
- Location within Charlevoix County and the administered CDPs of Ironton (1) and Advance (2)

- Location within the state of Michigan Location within the United States
- Coordinates: 45°13′59″N 85°09′25″W
- Country: United States
- State: Michigan
- County: Charlevoix

Government
  - Supervisor: John Vrondran
  - Clerk: Sandi Whiteford

Area
  - Total: 36.75 sq mi (95.18 km^{2})
  - Land: 25.81 sq mi (66.85 km^{2})
  - Water: 10.94 sq mi (28.33 km^{2})
- Elevation: 735 ft (224 m)

Population (2020)
  - Total: 1,515
  - Density: 58.70/sq mi (22.66/km^{2})
- Time zone: UTC-5 (Eastern (EST))
  - Summer (DST): UTC-4 (EDT)
- ZIP code(s): 49712 (Boyne City); 49720 (Charlevoix); 49727 (East Jordan)
- Area code: 231
- FIPS code: 26-26680
- GNIS feature ID: 1626255
- Website: Official website

Eveline Township is a civil township of Charlevoix County in the U.S. state of Michigan. The population was 1,515 at the 2020 census.

== Communities ==
- Advance is an unincorporated community and census-designated place located in the eastern portion of township at 45°13′17″N 85°04′39″W.
- Bedwin is a historic settlement located within the township. It was named for storekeeper Robert Bedwin, and the community contained its own post office briefly from June 24, 1884, until January 25, 1887.
- Eveline is a historic settlement located that was located in the center of the township. Named after the township, a post office named Eveline opened on February 28, 1877, but is no longer in operation.
- Ironton is an unincorporated community and census-designated place located within the township at 45°15′28″N 85°11′26″W.
- Holy Island was a historic settlement founded by James Strang on Holy Island in 1855 shortly before his death.
- Raymond is a former community that existed very briefly with a post office that operated from January 24, 1891, until January 25, 1892.
- Rock Elm is a former settlement within the township along the south arm of Pine Lake (now Lake Charlevoix). It began with a rural post office that opened on July 3, 1876, with Hiram Hipp serving as the first postmaster. The post office closed on December 9, 1886.

== Geography ==
According to the U.S. Census Bureau, the township has a total area of 36.75 square miles (95.18 km^{2}), of which 25.81 square miles (66.85 km^{2}) is land and 10.94 square miles (28.33 km^{2}) (29.77%) is water.

Eveline Township occupies most of the southern coast of Lake Charlevoix between the cities of Boyne City and Charlevoix. The township is divided by the south arm of Lake Charlevoix, with no road access directly connecting the two sides. The Ironton Ferry along a narrow stretch of the lake provides transportation between the two sides. The township also contains Holy Island.

=== Major highways ===
- M-66 runs south–north through the western portion of the township along Lake Charlevoix.

== Demographics ==
As of the census of 2000, there were 1,560 people, 620 households, and 489 families residing in the township. The population density was 59.9 inhabitants per square mile (23.1/km^{2}). There were 1,298 housing units at an average density of 49.8 per square mile (19.2/km^{2}). The racial makeup of the township was 95.26% White, 0.06% African American, 2.50% Native American, 0.19% Asian, 0.06% Pacific Islander, 0.13% from other races, and 1.79% from two or more races. Hispanic or Latino of any race were 1.35% of the population.

There were 620 households, out of which 26.9% had children under the age of 18 living with them, 69.4% were married couples living together, 5.8% had a female householder with no husband present, and 21.0% were non-families. 17.3% of all households were made up of individuals, and 7.4% had someone living alone who was 65 years of age or older. The average household size was 2.52 and the average family size was 2.81.

In the township the population was spread out, with 22.4% under the age of 18, 5.1% from 18 to 24, 23.6% from 25 to 44, 31.6% from 45 to 64, and 17.3% who were 65 years of age or older. The median age was 44 years. For every 100 females, there were 96.2 males. For every 100 females age 18 and over, there were 95.5 males.

The median income for a household in the township was $46,250, and the median income for a family was $51,397. Males had a median income of $34,922 versus $21,750 for females. The per capita income for the township was $22,440. About 6.3% of families and 9.4% of the population were below the poverty line, including 19.7% of those under age 18 and 2.7% of those age 65 or over.

== Education ==
Eveline Township is served by three separate school districts. The majority of the township is served by East Jordan Public Schools to the south in the city of East Jordan. The eastern portion of the township, including most of the CDP of Advance, is served by Boyne City Public Schools to the east in the city of Boyne City. The northwest corner of the township, including most of the CDP of Ironton, is served by Charlevoix Public Schools to the northwest in the city of Charlevoix.
