= Wilson Township, Charlevoix County, Michigan =

Wilson Township, Michigan
- Civil township
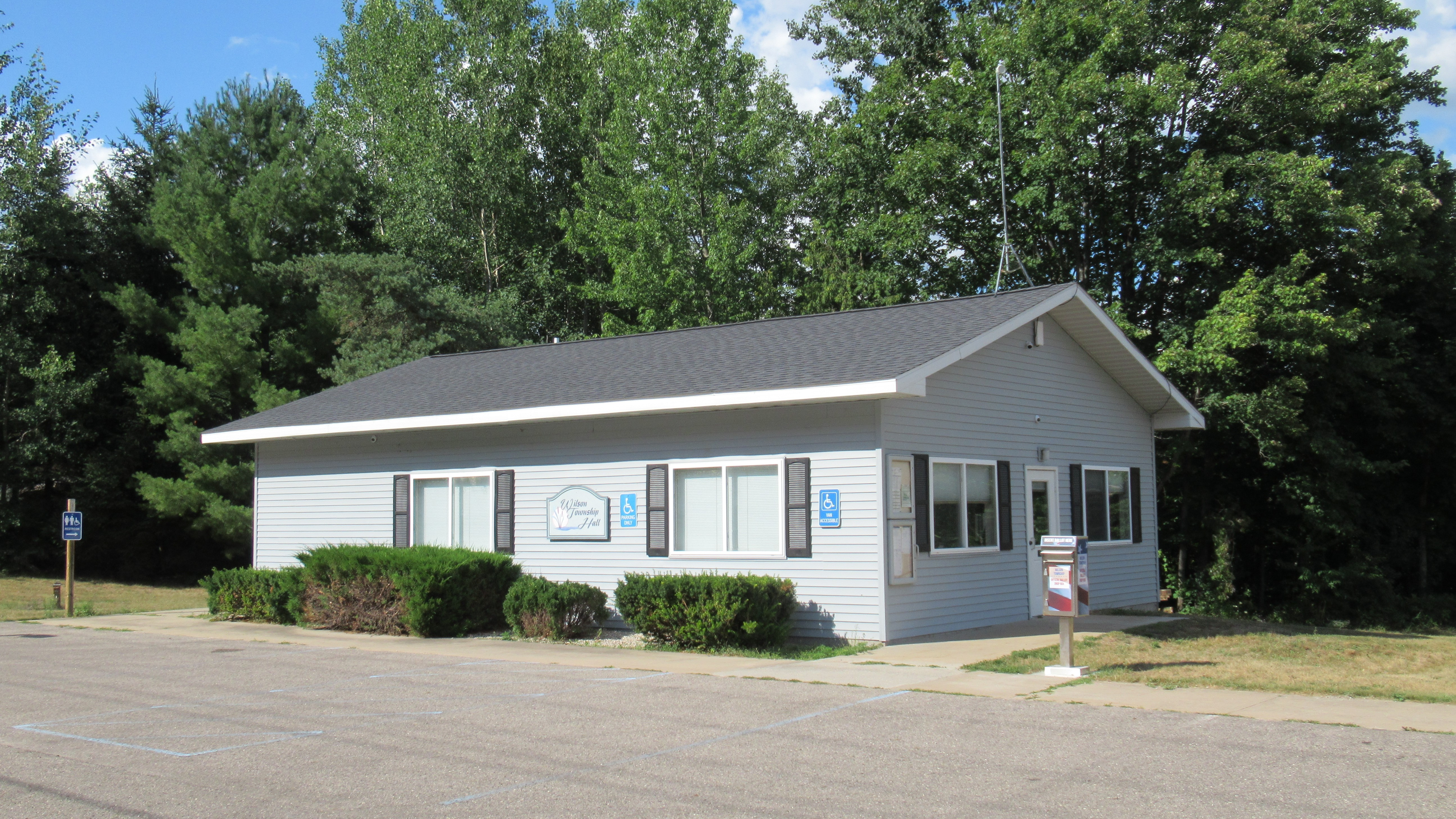
- Wilson Township Hall

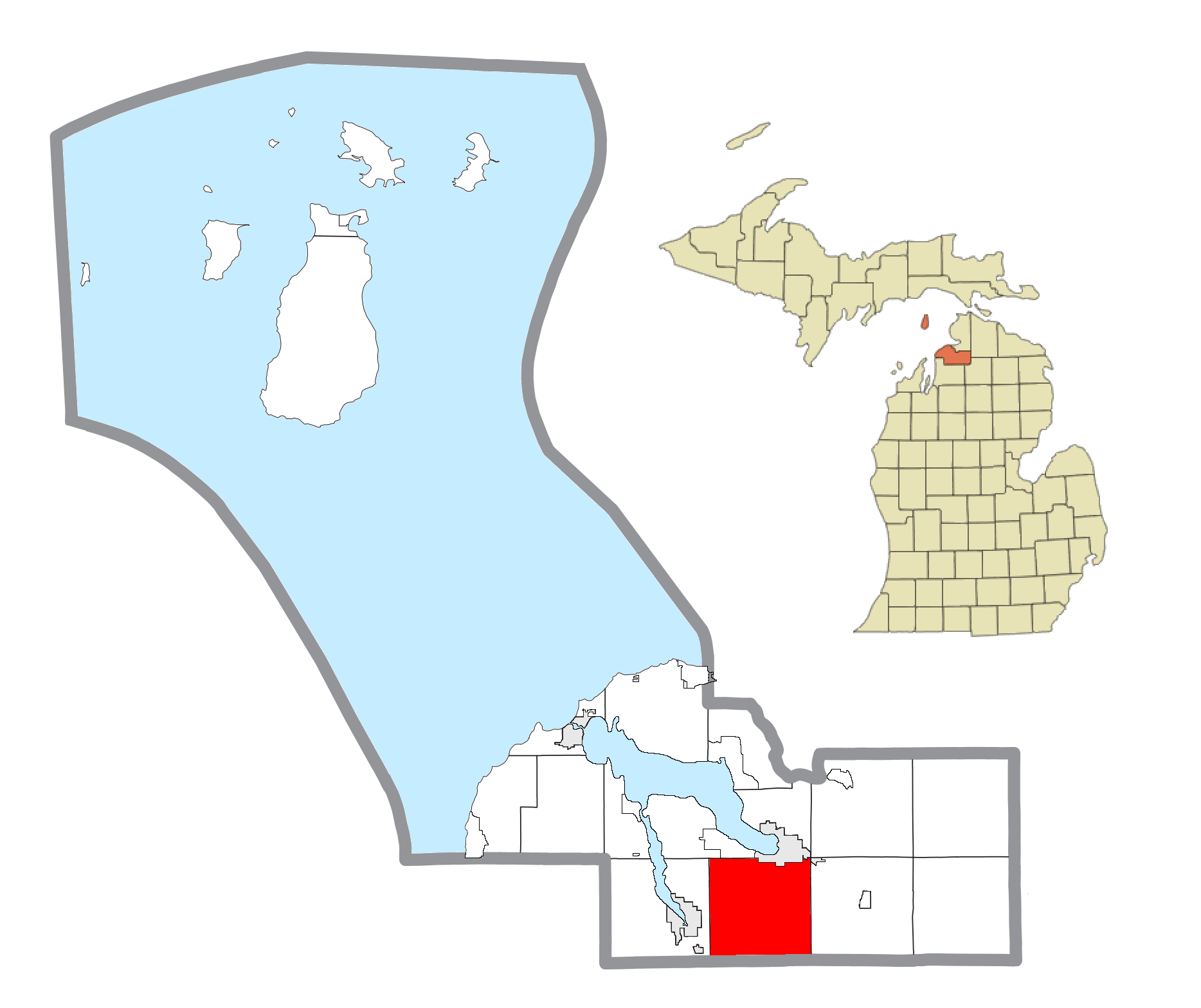
- Location within Charlevoix County

- Location within the state of Michigan Location within the state of Michigan
- Coordinates: 45°09′09″N 85°01′55″W
- Country: United States
- State: Michigan
- County: Charlevoix

Government
  - Supervisor: Todd Sorenson
  - Clerk: Marilyn Beebe

Area
  - Total: 34.42 sq mi (89.15 km^{2})
  - Land: 34.05 sq mi (88.19 km^{2})
  - Water: 0.37 sq mi (0.96 km^{2})
- Elevation: 774 ft (236 m)

Population (2020)
  - Total: 1,858
  - Density: 54.57/sq mi (21.07/km^{2})
- Time zone: UTC-5 (Eastern (EST))
  - Summer (DST): UTC-4 (EDT)
- ZIP code(s): 49712 (Boyne City); 49727 (East Jordan)
- Area code: 231
- FIPS code: 26-87700
- GNIS feature ID: 1627278
- Website: Official website

Wilson Township is a civil township of Charlevoix County in the U.S. state of Michigan. The population was 1,858 at the 2020 census.

== Communities ==
- Afton is a former settlement within the township that briefly had its own rural post office from February 28, 1891 to October 30, 1893.

== Geography ==
According to the U.S. Census Bureau, the township has a total area of 34.42 square miles (89.15 km^{2}), of which 34.05 square miles (88.19 km^{2}) is land and 0.37 square miles (0.96 km^{2}) (1.07%) is water.

=== Major highways ===
- M-75 runs briefly through the northeastern corner of the township.
- M-32 runs briefly through the southwestern corner of the township.
- C-48 (East Jordan–Boyne City Road) is a county-designated highway that runs west–east through the center of the township.
- C-73 is a county-designated highway that runs the length of the eastern portion of the township and carries various local names.

== Demographics ==
As of the census of 2000, there were 2,022 people, 762 households, and 550 families residing in the township. The population density was 59.4 inhabitants per square mile (22.9/km^{2}). There were 852 housing units at an average density of 25.0 per square mile (9.7/km^{2}). The racial makeup of the township was 97.03% White, 0.10% African American, 1.29% Native American, 0.05% Asian, 0.05% Pacific Islander, 0.20% from other races, and 1.29% from two or more races. Hispanic or Latino of any race were 0.84% of the population.

There were 762 households, out of which 37.9% had children under the age of 18 living with them, 58.4% were married couples living together, 9.3% had a female householder with no husband present, and 27.7% were non-families. 23.0% of all households were made up of individuals, and 6.8% had someone living alone who was 65 years of age or older. The average household size was 2.65 and the average family size was 3.14.

In the township the population was spread out, with 29.4% under the age of 18, 7.9% from 18 to 24, 29.8% from 25 to 44, 24.2% from 45 to 64, and 8.8% who were 65 years of age or older. The median age was 36 years. For every 100 females, there were 102.6 males. For every 100 females age 18 and over, there were 104.9 males.

The median income for a household in the township was $38,030, and the median income for a family was $43,241. Males had a median income of $33,833 versus $22,917 for females. The per capita income for the township was $16,691. About 6.8% of families and 8.0% of the population were below the poverty line, including 8.6% of those under age 18 and 8.0% of those age 65 or over.

== Education ==
Wilson Township is served by two separate public school districts. The southwestern portion of the township is served by East Jordan Public Schools to the east in the city of East Jordan. The northeastern portion of the township is served by Boyne City Public Schools to the north in the city of Boyne City.
