= South Armagh =

South Armagh may refer to:

- The southern part of County Armagh
- South Armagh (Northern Ireland Parliament constituency)
- South Armagh (UK Parliament constituency)
- Provisional IRA South Armagh Brigade
