= East Jordan Public Schools =

School district in Michigan

Address
- 304 Fourth Street East Jordan, Charlevoix County, Michigan, 49727; United States

District information
- Motto: EJPS ... A great place to learn!
- Grades: PreKindergarten–12
- Superintendent: Enos M. Bacon III
- Schools: 3
- Budget: $13,630,000 2021–2022 expenditures
- NCES District ID: 2612560

Students and staff
- Students: 722 (2024–2025)
- Teachers: 59.38 (on an FTE basis) (2024–2025)
- Staff: 123.45 FTE (2024–2025)
- Student–teacher ratio: 12.16 (2024–2025)
- District mascot: Red Devils

Other information
- Website: www.ejps.org

East Jordan Public Schools is a public school district in Northern Michigan. In Charlevoix County, it serves East Jordan and parts of the townships of Eveline, South Arm, and Wilson. In Antrim County, it serves parts of Echo Township and Jordan Township.

== History ==
A new high school was built in East Jordan around 1921, which is currently used as the elementary school. In March 1941, much of the building was destroyed by fire, and the current two-story structure was proposed later that year. The building was expanded again in 1955.

The current middle/high school, carefully placed by architects into a grove of trees, opened in fall 1978. The dedication, on October 6, 1978, was attended by Governor William Milliken.

A new middle school opened in fall 1997, part of a construction campaign funded by a $5.3 million bond issue passed in 1995. Additions and renovations were also made to the high school and elementary school. Currently, the 1997 middle school building is known as the Mill Street Campus, a multipurpose building, and the middle school students attend the high school, now known as East Jordan Middle/High School.

Bond issues to fund technology and construction projects passed in 2002 and 2011. A 2016 bond issue failed by a single vote, but passed the next year.

== Schools ==
Schools in East Jordan Public Schools district
School	Address	Notes
East Jordan Middle/High School	101 Maple Street, East Jordan	Grades 9–12
East Jordan Elementary	304 Fourth Street, East Jordan	Grades PreK-6
Northern Michigan Innovation Academy		Grades 7–12; online school in partnership with U-Tech Preparatory Academy, an extension of Jenison Innovation Academy
