= Lake Charlevoix =

Lake in the state of Michigan, United States

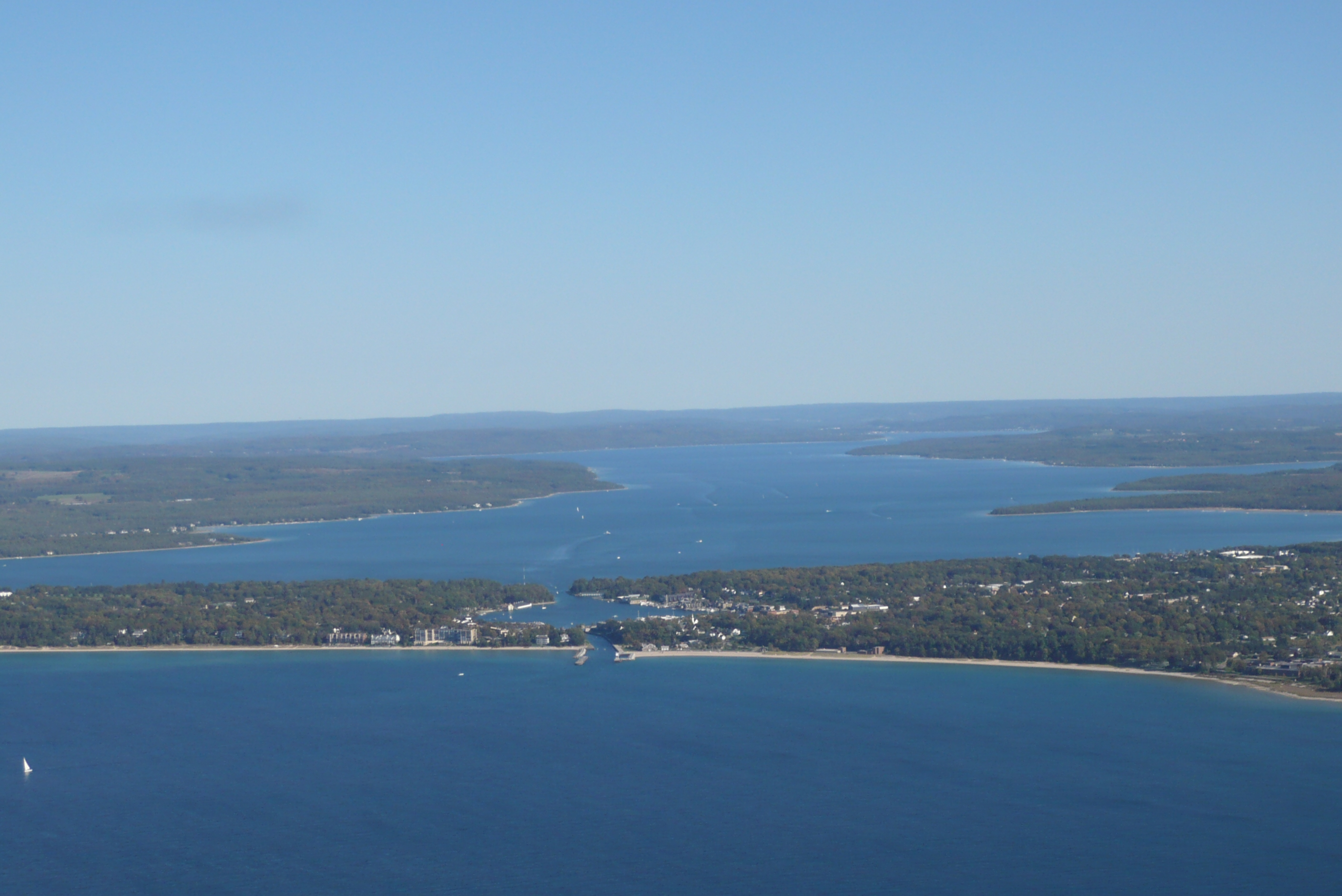
- Lake Charlevoix (top-most body of water)

- Location within Michigan Location within the United States
- Location: Charlevoix County, Michigan
- Coordinates: 45°16′38″N 85°10′25″W
- Type: Natural freshwater lake
- Primary inflows: Jordan River, Boyne River
- Catchment area: 335 sq mi (870 km^{2})
- Basin countries: United States
- Max. length: 13 mi (21 km)
- Max. width: 2.4 mi (3.9 km)
- Surface area: 17,200 acres (7,000 ha)
- Max. depth: 122 ft (37 m)
- Shore length^{1}: 56 mi (90 km)
- Surface elevation: 581 ft (177 m)
- Islands: Holy Island (in the south arm)
- ^{1} Shore length is not a well-defined measure.

Lake Charlevoix (/ˈʃɑːrləvɔɪ/ SHAR-lə-voy) is a lake in Charlevoix County in the U.S. state of Michigan. It is the third largest inland lake in the state with a surface area of over 17,200 acres (70 km^{2}) and 56 miles (90 km) of shoreline. The maximum depth in the main basin is 122 feet (37 m) and in the south arm, 58 feet (18 m).

The lake's largest tributaries are the Jordan River, feeding into the south arm at East Jordan, and the Boyne River, flowing into the main basin from the east at Boyne City. Other significant tributaries include Horton, Stover, Porter, and Loeb Creeks. The outflow of Lake Charlevoix is the short Round Lake/Pine River complex which discharges into Lake Michigan at Charlevoix. The lake's watershed covers 335 square miles (870 km^{2}) in Charlevoix and Antrim Counties, and a small portion of the northwest corner of Otsego County.

The lake occupies portions of Charlevoix Township, Marion Township, Hayes Township, Eveline Township, Bay Township, and Evangeline Township.

Young State Park is located on the shore of the lake just northwest of Boyne City. The Ironton Ferry at Ironton, a designated Michigan Historical Site in operation since 1876, crosses the south arm where it branches off from the main basin, saving about 20 minutes of driving time around the south arm by the shoreline route.

The lake was also known previously as Pine Lake and Long Lake. It was renamed from "Pine Lake" to its current name ("Lake Charlevoix") in 1926.

== See also ==
- List of lakes in Michigan
