= Charlevoix County, Michigan =

County in Michigan, United States

- County
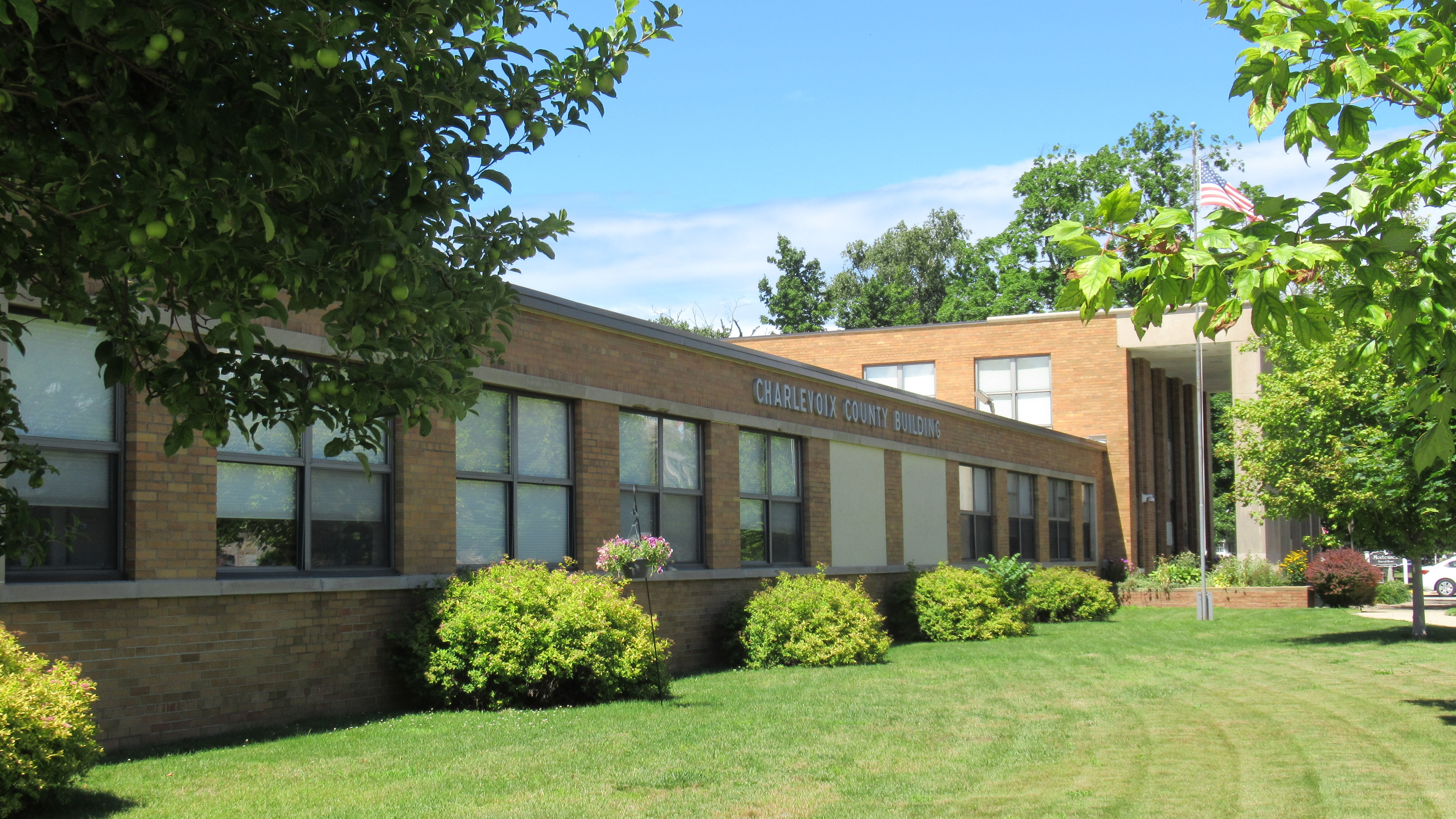
- Charlevoix County Building

- Logo

- Location within the U.S. state of Michigan
- Coordinates: 45°28′N 85°28′W
- Country: United States
- State: Michigan
- Created: 1840
- Organized: 1869
- Named for: Pierre François Xavier de Charlevoix
- Seat: Charlevoix
- Largest city: Boyne City

Area
  - Total: 1,390 sq mi (3,600 km^{2})
  - Land: 416 sq mi (1,080 km^{2})
  - Water: 974 sq mi (2,520 km^{2}) 70%

Population (2020)
  - Total: 26,054
  - Estimate (2025): 26,036 ▼
  - Density: 62.6/sq mi (24.2/km^{2})
- Time zone: UTC−5 (Eastern)
  - Summer (DST): UTC−4 (EDT)
- Congressional district: 1st
- Website: www.charlevoixcounty.org

Charlevoix County (/ˈʃɑːrləvɔɪ/ SHAR-lə-voy) is a county in the U.S. state of Michigan. The county seat is Charlevoix, and the largest city is Boyne City. Located in the Northern Lower Peninsula, Charlevoix County is bisected by Lake Charlevoix, Michigan's third largest inland lake. As of the 2020 census, the county's population was 26,054. Beaver Island, the largest island in Lake Michigan, is located within Charlevoix County.

== History ==
=== Surveyed and organized as Keskkauko County ===
Between 1840 and 1841, surveyors William Austin Burt, John Mullett and Charles W. Cathcart, surveyed much of Northern Michigan. Cathcart oversaw the internal lines survey for 34N 08W, the region which would later be known as Charlevoix. Mullett and Cathcart laid out many of the townships in the new county including Charlevoix Township.

The county was originally organized in 1840 as Kesk-kauko in honor of a great chief of the Saginaw tribe, and name was changed from Resh-kanko to Charlevoix County in 1843. The county was named in 1843 for Pierre François Xavier de Charlevoix, a Jesuit missionary of the French colonial era.

=== Strangites gain power and re-organize Keskkauko into Emmet County ===
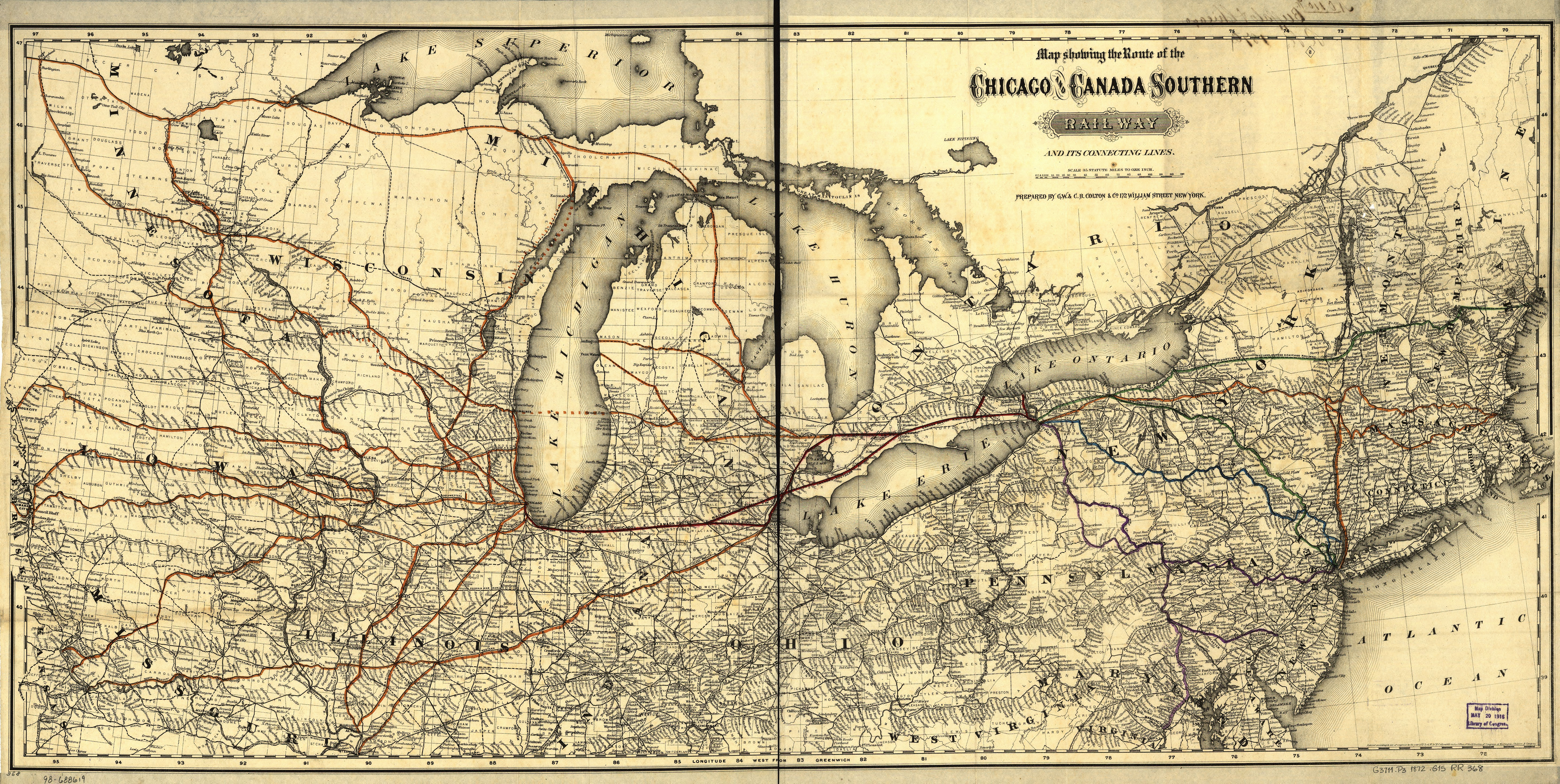
Most of present day Charlevoix County was originally part of Emmet County.

In 1847, a group of "Strangite" Mormons settled on Beaver Island and established a "kingdom" led by "King" James Jesse Strang. There were bitter disputes between Strang's followers and other white settlers. Strang, seeking to strengthen his position, gained election to the Michigan State House of Representatives. In January 1853, he pushed through legislation titled, "An act to organize the County of Emmet", which enlarged Emmet County by attaching the nearby Lake Michigan islands to Emmet county, as well as a portion of Cheboygan County and Keskkauko/Resh-kanko/ Charlevoix. Charlevoix was thus organized in 1853 as a township under Emmet County and consisted all of the nine townships in the southern half of Emmet County.

=== Popular dissatisfaction with Mormon power ===
Due to Strang's influence, Mormons came to dominate Emmet county government, causing an exodus of many non-Mormon settlers to neighboring areas. In 1855, the non-Mormon resistance succeeded in getting the Michigan Legislature to reorganize Emmet County. The islands, including Beaver Island and North and South Manitou Islands, were transferred into the separate Manitou County, which effectively eliminated Mormons from Emmet County government. After an assassination attempt on June 20, 1856, Strang died three weeks later.

=== Charlevoix Township splits off to become Charlevoix County in 1869 ===
Emmet County continued to experience tensions as citizens clashed over whether to put the county seat at Little Traverse (Harbor Springs) versus Mackinaw City. In a contested election in 1867, residents voted to move the county seat to Charlevoix, which was upheld by a Circuit Court decision in 1868. However, in 1869, Charlevoix County was split from Emmet County, resulting in Charlevoix being the official county seat for Emmet county as well as for the newly formed Charlevoix County.

=== County seat wars – Charlevoix vs East Jordan vs Boyne City ===
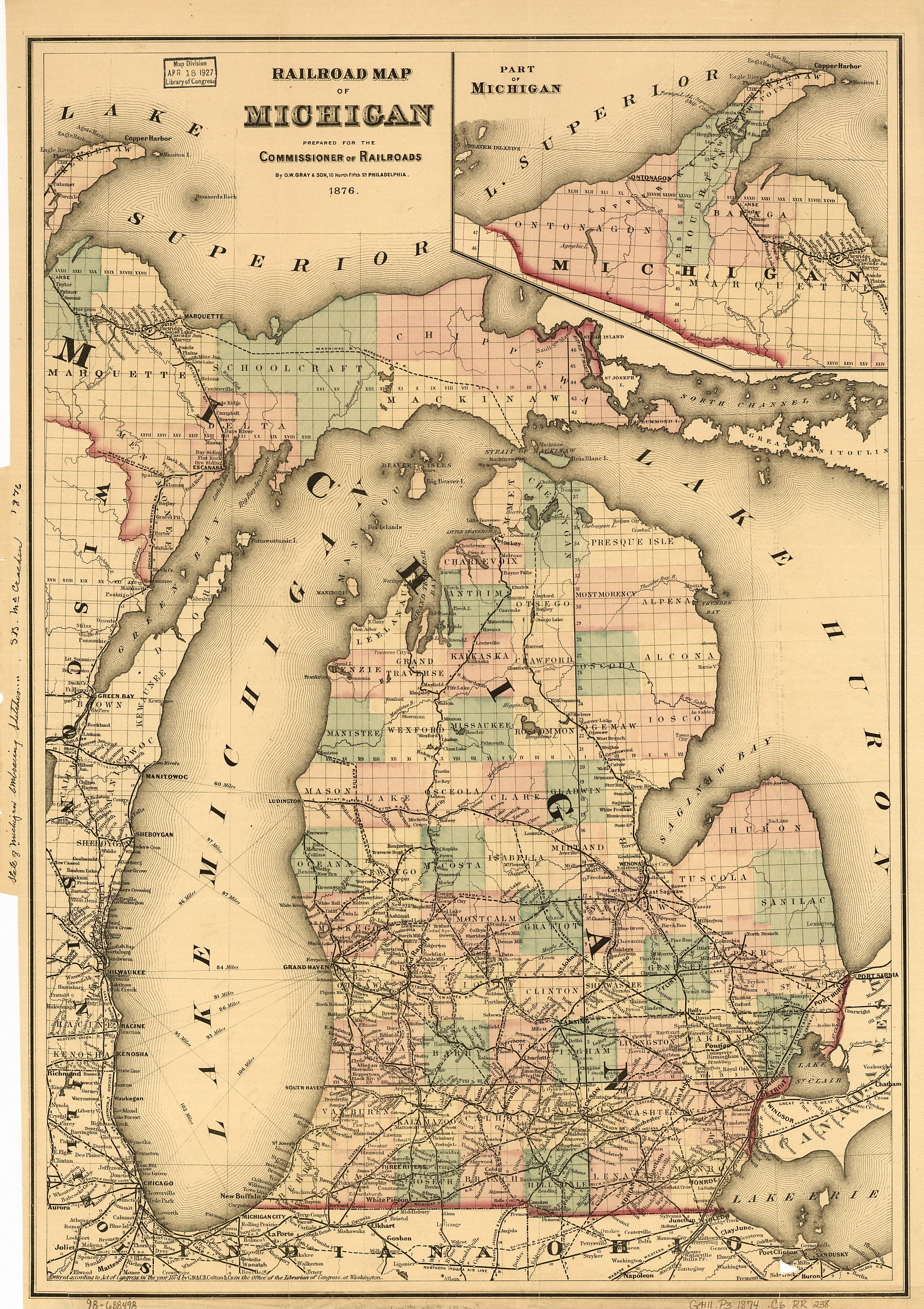
By 1876, the Grand Rapids and Indiana Railroad had built a line north to Petoskey with stops in Boyne Falls and Melrose. This link to cities in lower Michigan brought increased population to Charlevoix County, and new political power to the eastern part of the county.

In 1873, the Grand Rapids and Indiana Railroad was completed through the eastern side of Charlevoix county up to Petoskey, and the east side of Pine Lake became more and more populated. For example, Resort Township and Springvale Township, Michigan were formed in 1880 as a part of Charlevoix County. As new townships became established, Boyne City colluded with East Jordan to gain a requisite 2/3 majority of township supervisors to vote to move the county seat to East Jordan. In October 1884, 11 of the existing 16 township supervisors designated East Jordan to be the county seat. In October 1886, Boyne City convinced 2/3 of township supervisors to move the county seat to Boyne City.

Finally, in a January 1897 land deal with Emmet County and the state legislature, Charlevoix County took on three townships on Beaver Island while giving up Resort, Bear Lake, and Springvale townships to Emmet County. The resulting balance of township supervisor votes gave the City of Charlevoix enough votes to obtain the county seat after a 13-year hiatus.

=== Other history ===
The Ironton Ferry began operation in 1876, and Ironton soon became a location for iron manufacture.

There are ten Michigan state historical markers in the county, and the area was once home to a thriving culture of Odawa fishers, hunters, and fur trappers.:

- Big Rock Point Nuclear Power Plant
- Boyne City United Methodist Church
- Charlevoix Depot
- Greensky Hill Mission
- Horace S. Harsha House
- Horton Bay
- John Porter and Eva Porter Estate
- Mormon Kingdom
- Mormon Print Shop
- Norwood Township Hall

== Geography ==
According to the U.S. Census Bureau, the county has a total area of 1,390 square miles (3,600 km^{2}), of which 416 square miles (1,080 km^{2}) is land and 974 square miles (2,520 km^{2}) (70%) is water. It is the fourth-smallest county in Michigan by land area.

Mainland Charlevoix County features a shoreline on both Traverse Bays (Grand Traverse Bay and Little Traverse Bay) of Lake Michigan.

Lake Charlevoix, with 17,200 acres (7,000 ha) surface area and 56 miles (90 km) of shoreline, is a very prominent feature of the county. Gull, Hat, Pismire, and Shoe Islands, which are part of the Beaver Island archipelago, form the Lake Michigan division of the Michigan Islands National Wildlife Refuge, and two of them are part of the Michigan Islands Wilderness Area.

The county is considered to be part of Northern Michigan.

=== Adjacent counties ===
By land

- Emmet County (north)
- Cheboygan County (northeast)
- Otsego County (southeast)
- Antrim County (south)

By water

- Mackinac County (north)
- Leelanau County (southwest)
- Schoolcraft County (northwest)

=== National protected area ===
- Michigan Islands National Wildlife Refuge (part)

== Communities ==
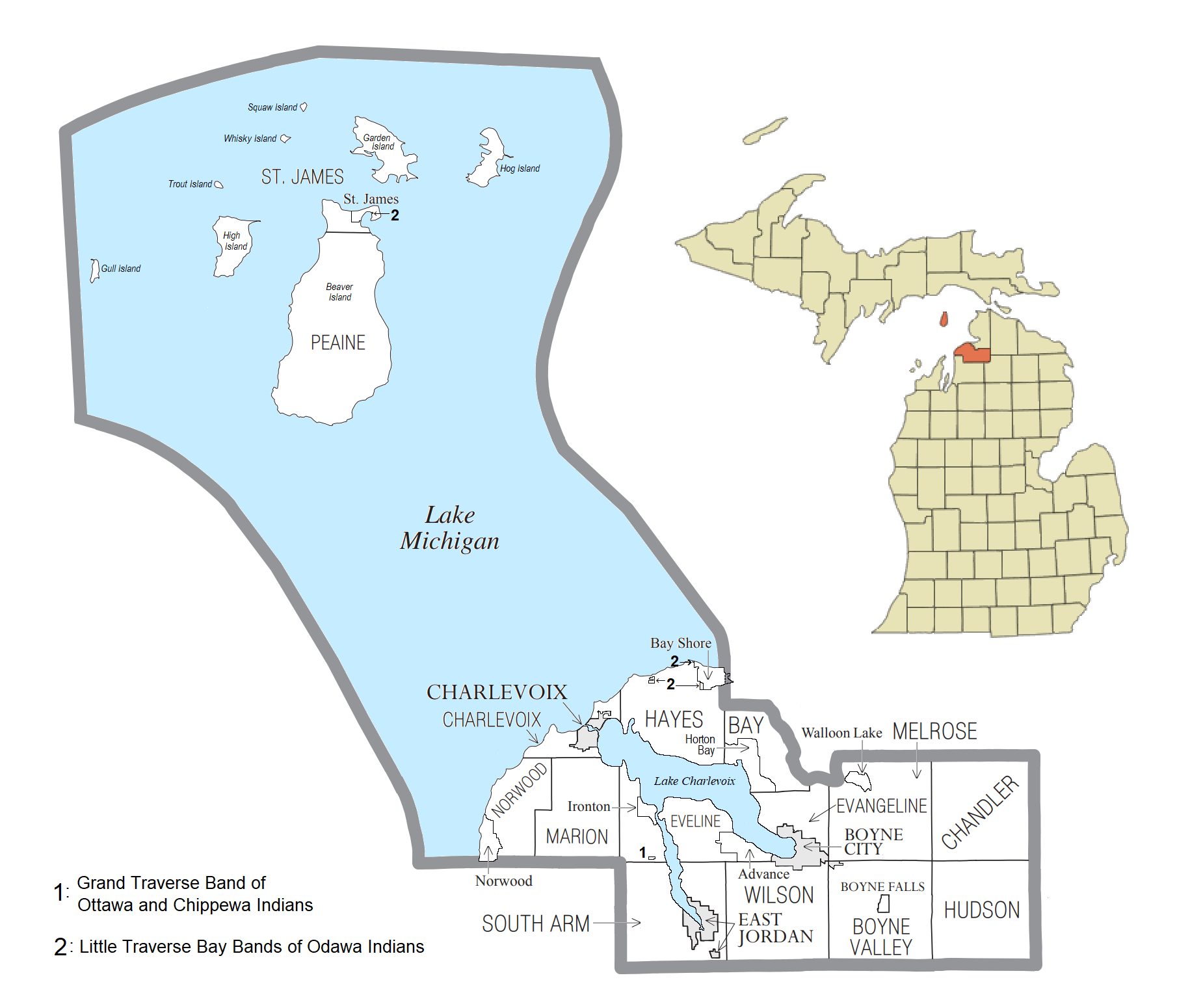
U.S. Census data map showing local municipal boundaries within Charlevoix County, as well as CDP boundaries. Shaded areas represent incorporated cities.

=== Cities ===
- Boyne City
- Charlevoix (county seat)
- East Jordan

=== Village ===
- Boyne Falls

=== Civil townships ===
- Bay Township
- Boyne Valley Township
- Chandler Township
- Charlevoix Township
- Evangeline Township
- Eveline Township
- Hayes Township
- Hudson Township
- Marion Township
- Melrose Township
- Norwood Township
- Peaine Township
- South Arm Township
- St. James Township
- Wilson Township

=== Census-designated places ===
- Advance
- Bay Shore
- Horton Bay
- Ironton
- Norwood
- St. James
- Walloon Lake

=== Other unincorporated communities ===
- Barnard
- Beaver Island
- Bonner Landing
- Boulder Park
- Burgess
- Clarion
- Martins Bluff
- Nomad
- Phelps
- Wildwood
- Zenith Heights

=== Indian reservations ===
Charlevoix County contains portions of two Indian reservations, both of which are branches of the federally-recognized Odawa tribe. The Grand Traverse Band of Ottawa and Chippewa Indians occupies a small reservation in southwest Evaline Township. The Little Traverse Bay Bands of Odawa Indians has four scattered reservations throughout the county—three small sections in Hayes Township and one isolated section in St. James Township on Beaver Island.

== Demographics ==
Historical population
Census	Pop.	Note	%±
1870	1,724		—
1880	5,115		196.7%
1890	9,686		89.4%
1900	13,956		44.1%
1910	19,157		37.3%
1920	15,788		−17.6%
1930	11,981		−24.1%
1940	13,031		8.8%
1950	13,475		3.4%
1960	13,421		−0.4%
1970	16,541		23.2%
1980	19,907		20.3%
1990	21,468		7.8%
2000	26,090		21.5%
2010	25,949		−0.5%
2020	26,054		0.4%
2025 (est.)	26,036	▼	−0.1%
U.S. Decennial Census; 1790–1960 1900–1990; 1990–2000 2010–2018

=== Racial and ethnic composition ===
Charlevoix County, Michigan – Racial and ethnic composition Note: the US Census treats Hispanic/Latino as an ethnic category. This table excludes Latinos from the racial categories and assigns them to a separate category. Hispanics/Latinos may be of any race.
Race / Ethnicity (NH = Non-Hispanic)	Pop 1980	Pop 1990	Pop 2000	Pop 2010	Pop 2020	% 1980	% 1990	% 2000	% 2010	% 2020
White alone (NH)	19,465	20,925	24,990	24,602	23,881	97.78%	97.47%	95.78%	94.81%	91.66%
Black or African American alone (NH)	15	17	42	76	74	0.08%	0.08%	0.16%	0.29%	0.28%
Native American or Alaska Native alone (NH)	325	372	386	359	367	1.63%	1.73%	1.48%	1.38%	1.41%
Asian alone (NH)	38	38	59	99	122	0.19%	0.18%	0.23%	0.38%	0.47%
Native Hawaiian or Pacific Islander alone (NH)	x	x	19	11	10	x	x	0.07%	0.04%	0.04%
Other race alone (NH)	2	4	17	11	114	0.01%	0.02%	0.07%	0.04%	0.44%
Mixed race or Multiracial (NH)	x	x	305	432	1,061	x	x	1.17%	1.66%	4.07%
Hispanic or Latino (any race)	62	112	272	359	425	0.31%	0.52%	1.04%	1.38%	1.63%
Total	19,907	21,468	26,090	25,949	26,054	100.00%	100.00%	100.00%	100.00%	100.00%

=== 2020 census ===
As of the 2020 census, the county had a population of 26,054, a median age of 49.8 years, and 18.4% of residents under the age of 18. 25.6% of residents were 65 years of age or older. For every 100 females there were 99.5 males, and for every 100 females age 18 and over there were 97.6 males age 18 and over.

The racial makeup of the county was 92.3% White, 0.3% Black or African American, 1.5% American Indian and Alaska Native, 0.5% Asian, <0.1% Native Hawaiian and Pacific Islander, 0.6% from some other race, and 4.8% from two or more races. Hispanic or Latino residents of any race comprised 1.6% of the population.

30.2% of residents lived in urban areas, while 69.8% lived in rural areas.

There were 11,274 households in the county, of which 23.0% had children under the age of 18 living in them. Of all households, 51.2% were married-couple households, 18.7% were households with a male householder and no spouse or partner present, and 23.2% were households with a female householder and no spouse or partner present. About 29.6% of all households were made up of individuals and 14.9% had someone living alone who was 65 years of age or older.

There were 17,451 housing units, of which 35.4% were vacant. Among occupied housing units, 80.8% were owner-occupied and 19.2% were renter-occupied. The homeowner vacancy rate was 1.6% and the rental vacancy rate was 14.0%.

=== 2000 census ===
As of the census of 2000, there were 26,090 people, 10,400 households, and 7,311 families residing in the county. The population density was 63 people per square mile (24 people/km^{2}). There were 15,370 housing units at an average density of 37 per square mile (14/km^{2}).

In 2000, the racial makeup of the county was 96.31% White, 0.17% Black or African American, 1.54% Native American, 0.23% Asian, 0.09% Pacific Islander, 0.41% from other races, and 1.25% from two or more races. 1.04% of the population were Hispanic or Latino of any race. 21.8% were of German, 12.0% English, 11.0% American, 10.6% Irish and 8.4% Polish ancestry. 97.3% spoke English and 1.1% Spanish as their first language.

There were 10,400 households, out of which 31.80% had children under the age of 18 living with them, 58.40% were married couples living together, 8.10% had a female householder with no husband present, and 29.80% were non-families. 25.20% of all households were made up of individuals, and 10.50% had someone living alone who was 65 years of age or older. The average household size was 2.48 and the average family size was 2.96.

In the county, 25.90% of the population was under the age of 18, 6.50% from 18 to 24, 27.40% from 25 to 44, 25.20% from 45 to 64, and 14.90% who were 65 years of age or older. The median age was 39 years. For every 100 females there were 97.90 males. For every 100 females age 18 and over, there were 94.80 males.

In 2000, the median income for a household in the county was $39,788, and the median income for a family was $46,260. Males had a median income of $32,457 versus $22,447 for females. The per capita income for the county was $20,130. About 5.40% of families and 8.00% of the population were below the poverty line, including 10.00% of those under age 18 and 5.90% of those age 65 or over.

== Government ==
United States presidential election results for Charlevoix County, Michigan
Year	Republican		Democratic		Third party(ies)	
Year	No.	%	No.	%	No.	%
1876	411	66.72%	205	33.28%	0	0.00%
1880	784	67.12%	304	26.03%	80	6.85%
1884	1,043	54.21%	825	42.88%	56	2.91%
1888	1,270	56.70%	874	39.02%	96	4.29%
1892	1,101	53.14%	688	33.20%	283	13.66%
1896	1,653	61.06%	978	36.13%	76	2.81%
1900	2,268	71.28%	776	24.39%	138	4.34%
1904	2,772	81.39%	469	13.77%	165	4.84%
1908	2,530	68.92%	801	21.82%	340	9.26%
1912	1,296	36.82%	566	16.08%	1,658	47.10%
1916	1,877	54.72%	1,152	33.59%	401	11.69%
1920	3,079	77.07%	704	17.62%	212	5.31%
1924	3,346	79.65%	406	9.66%	449	10.69%
1928	3,489	79.97%	842	19.30%	32	0.73%
1932	2,623	49.57%	2,344	44.30%	324	6.12%
1936	2,814	49.18%	2,669	46.64%	239	4.18%
1940	3,522	61.40%	2,163	37.71%	51	0.89%
1944	3,039	61.10%	1,893	38.06%	42	0.84%
1948	2,911	59.47%	1,847	37.73%	137	2.80%
1952	3,895	68.07%	1,778	31.07%	49	0.86%
1956	3,924	66.80%	1,935	32.94%	15	0.26%
1960	3,987	62.11%	2,422	37.73%	10	0.16%
1964	2,664	41.44%	3,757	58.45%	7	0.11%
1968	3,696	55.14%	2,446	36.49%	561	8.37%
1972	4,522	59.04%	2,831	36.96%	306	4.00%
1976	5,145	55.57%	3,953	42.70%	160	1.73%
1980	5,053	51.58%	3,741	38.19%	1,002	10.23%
1984	6,355	66.23%	3,175	33.09%	65	0.68%
1988	5,802	59.43%	3,875	39.69%	85	0.87%
1992	4,017	34.85%	4,063	35.25%	3,445	29.89%
1996	4,864	44.23%	4,689	42.64%	1,443	13.12%
2000	7,018	56.20%	4,958	39.71%	511	4.09%
2004	8,214	58.09%	5,729	40.52%	196	1.39%
2008	7,306	50.74%	6,817	47.35%	275	1.91%
2012	8,000	56.64%	5,939	42.05%	186	1.32%
2016	8,674	59.19%	5,137	35.06%	843	5.75%
2020	9,841	57.79%	6,939	40.75%	250	1.47%
2024	10,183	57.66%	7,197	40.75%	281	1.59%

United States Senate election results for Charlevoix County, Michigan1
Year	Republican		Democratic		Third party(ies)	
Year	No.	%	No.	%	No.	%
2024	9,930	57.12%	6,979	40.15%	475	2.73%

Michigan Gubernatorial election results for Charlevoix County
Year	Republican		Democratic		Third party(ies)	
Year	No.	%	No.	%	No.	%
2022	7,667	52.27%	6,728	45.87%	274	1.87%

The county government operates the jail, maintains rural roads, operates the major local courts, keeps files of deeds and mortgages, maintains vital records, administers public health regulations, and participates with the state in the provision of welfare and other social services. The county board of commissioners controls the budget but has only limited authority to make laws or ordinances. In Michigan, most local government functions – police and fire, building and zoning, tax assessment, street maintenance, etc. — are the responsibility of individual cities and townships. Charlevoix is part of the 114th district.

== Transportation ==
=== State highways ===
- US 31 is a route that parallels the shore of Lake Michigan. The route passes through the city of Charlevoix, and can be used to access Traverse City to the south, and Petoskey and the Mackinac Bridge to the north.
- US 131 is a north–south route in the east of the county. The route passes through Boyne Falls.
- M-32 is an east–west route that begins in East Jordan, and continues southeast into Antrim County. The highway can be used to access Gaylord and Alpena, to the east.
- M-66 is a north–south route that terminates at US 31 in Charlevoix. The highway is the longest state trunkline highway in the Lower Peninsula, and continues south to the Indiana border near Sturgis.
- M-75 is a highway that runs entirely within Charlevoix County. The highway begins at US 131 in Boyne Falls, and continues northwest to Boyne City. The highway then turns northeasterly, and terminates once more at US 31 in Walloon Lake.

=== County-designated highways ===
- C-48
- C-56
- C-65
- C-71
- C-73
- C-81

=== Airports ===
- Beaver Island is served by two airlines:
  - Welke Airport
  - Beaver Island Airport

=== Ferry service ===
- Beaver Island Boat Company maintains a regular auto ferry from Charlevoix:
- The Ironton Ferry at Ironton, Michigan crosses the south arm of Lake Charlevoix. It is a designated Michigan Historical Site and has been in operation since 1876.

=== Bus service ===
- Indian Trails provides intercity bus service with stops in the city of Charlevoix and Boyne Falls.
- County-wide dial-a-ride bus service is provided by the Charlevoix County Transit System.

== See also ==
- List of Michigan State Historic Sites in Charlevoix County
- National Register of Historic Places listings in Charlevoix County, Michigan
