= Red Fox (disambiguation) =

The red fox is a small dog-like animal.

Red Fox or Redfox may refer to:

== Arts and entertainment ==
- Red Fox, a 1979 crime novel by Gerald Seymour
  - Red Fox (film), a 1991 British two-part television-film adaptation
- Red Fox and His Canoe, a 1964 children's reader by Nathaniel Benchley
- Redfox (comics), a late 1980s British comic book series
- The Red Fox, a 1985 novel by Anthony Hyde

== Businesses ==
- RedFox, a Belizean utility software company
- Red Fox, an American children's literature imprint of Random House
- Red Fox, a Russian outdoor equipment company

== People ==
- Chief Red Fox (1870–1976), American Lakota Sioux activist and actor
- Redd Foxx (1922–1991), American comedian and actor
- Emmett McLemore (1899–1973), American football player
- Michael Sinclair (British Army officer) (1918–1944), prisoner of war in WWII
- Norm Smith (1915–1973), Australian-rules football player and coach
- Campbell of Glenure, victim of the Appin Murder in the Scottish Highlands

== Places ==
- Redfox, Knott County, Kentucky, United States
- Peak of the Red Fox (Scottish Gaelic: Sgùrr a' Mhadaidh Ruaidh), on Skye, the Scottish Hebrides
- Red Fox Inn & Tavern, Virginia
- Red Fox Inn (Horton Bay, Michigan)

== Other uses ==
- RedFox, the children's wing of the Workers' Party of Belgium
- Marist Red Foxes, American athletic teams of Marist College, New York
