= Unison (disambiguation) =

In music, unison refers to multiple parts played or sung at the same pitch or at regular octaval intervals.

Unison may also refer to:

== Companies and organizations ==
- Unison (trade union), a British trade union
- Unison Healthcare Group, a Taiwanese medical device distributor
- Unison Home Ownership Investors, an American home ownership investment company
- Unison Industries, an American manufacturer of aircraft parts
- Unison Networks, a New Zealand electricity distribution and fibre optic network company
- Unison World School, a girls' residential school in Dehradun, Uttarakhand, India
- Universidad de Sonora (UNISON), a Mexican university

== Computing ==
- Unison (software), a cross-platform file synchronization tool
- Unison (Usenet client), a Usenet client for Mac OS X by Panic
- Unison: Rebels of Rhythm & Dance, a 2000 music video game by Tecmo for the PlayStation 2
- Unison (programming language), a programming language with an effect system as a core feature

== Geography and history ==
- Unison, Virginia, US, a village
  - Battle of Unison, an 1862 American Civil War battle near the village
  - Unison Historic District

== Music ==
- UniSon, a 2017 stage musical

=== Albums ===
- Unison (Celine Dion album) or the title song (see below), 1990
  - Unison (video), by Celine Dion, 1991
- Unison (George Mraz and Zoe Rahman album) or the title song, 2013
- Unison (Shin Terai album), 1999
- Unison, by Angels and Agony, 2007

=== Songs ===
- "Unison" (song), by Junior, 1983; covered by Celine Dion (1990) and others
- "Unison", by Björk from Vespertine, 2001
- "Unison", by Gang of Youths from Total Serene, 2021
- "Unison", by Nicole Scherzinger from Big Fat Lie, 2014
- "Unison", by Talking Heads from Remain in Light, 1980
- "Unison", by Porter Robinson from Spitfire, 2011

== See also ==
- Unisong International Song Contest
- Unisonic (disambiguation)
