= Red Fox Inn =

Red Fox Inn may refer to:

- Red Fox Inn & Tavern, a historic inn and tavern located in Middleburg, Virginia.
- Red Fox Inn (Horton Bay, Michigan), a historic inn and store located in Horton Bay, Michigan.
