= Horton Bay School =

- U.S. National Register of Historic Places
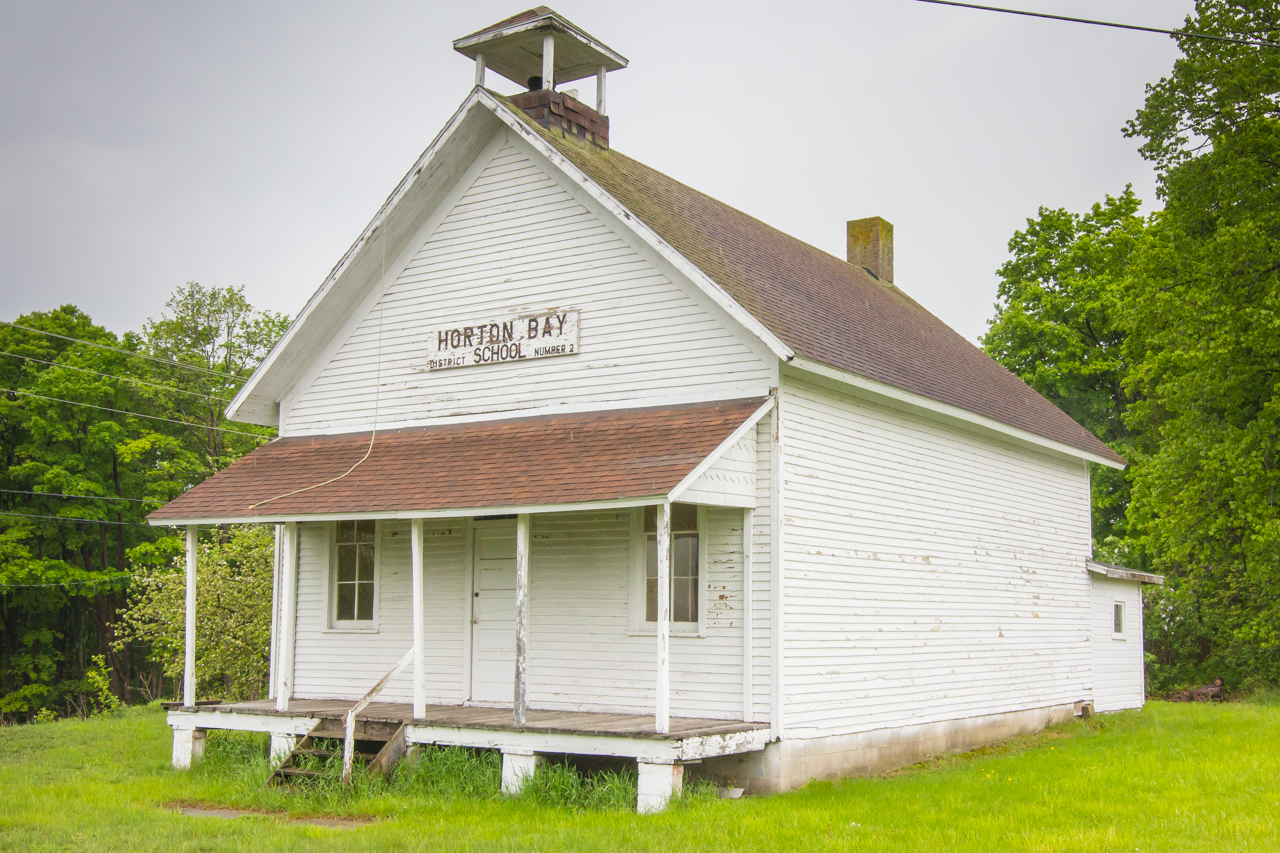

- Location within Michigan Location within the United States
- Interactive map
- Location: 04991 Boyne City-Charlevoix Rd., Horton Bay, Michigan
- Coordinates: 45°17′4″N 85°4′37″W
- Area: 0 acres (0 ha)
- Built: 1885
- NRHP reference No.: 00001603
- Added to NRHP: January 4, 2001

The Horton Bay School is a school building located at 04991 Boyne City-Charlevoix Road in Horton Bay, Michigan. It was listed in the National Register of Historic Places in 2001.

== History ==
What is now Bay Township, Michigan was part of Evangeline Township, established in 1855. However, settlement of the township was sparse until the early 1870s, when the Grand Rapids and Indiana Railroad constructed a line to Petoskey. During the 1872/73 school year, the county was split into four school districts; District Number 3 included the area around what is now Horton Bay. During the 1877/75 school year, a log schoolhouse was built at the corner of what are today Sumner and Camp Daggett roads, about a mile east of Horton Bay. The log schoolhouse served District Number 3 until the 1885/86 school year.

During the 1885/86 school year, District Number 3 spent $627.43 to construct this school, then located at the corner of Camp Sherwood and Zenith Heights roads, two miles east of Horton Bay. Around the same time, another frame schoolhouse was constructed for District Number 2, and located on this site. In 1887, Bay Township was carved out of Evangeline Township, with the former Evangeline Township School Districts 2 and 3 becoming the new Bay Township School Districts 2 and 3. This building served the students of Bay Township School District 3 until 1943, when the district was consolidated with the Boyne City schools.

However, in the mid-1940s, the schoolhouse used by Bay Township School District 2 burned, and classes were held in the township hall for two years. In the later 1940s, the Boyne City School District auctioned off the old Bay Township School District 3 building, and Bay Township School District 2 submitted the winning bid. This building was moved to Horton Bay, to the site of the burned school. It continued to serve the students of Bay Township School District 2 until 1963, when this district was also consolidated into a neighboring district.

After being closed as a school, the building became the property of the nearby Horton Bay United Methodist Church, who used it as a parish house. However, the building became used less and less, and by the early 2000s, the church considered selling the building for removal from the site. A Horton Bay Schoolhouse Restoration Committee was established to raise funds and restore the building.

== Description ==
The Horton Bay School is a single story, gable-front building with an open square-plan and a pyramid-roof cupola containing a large bell. The walls are white-painted and clapboarded walls. The front of the building has an open shed-roof porch, and the rear has a low hip-roof woodshed projection.

The interior of the school has an entry vestibule flanked with boys' and girls' cloakrooms. Exits from the cloakrooms lead to the single large schoolroom, at the back of which are small paneled doors for the girls' and boys' toilets, and another door leading to the woodshed. The walls have three-foot high wainscoting, and slate blackboards line one wall.
