= Horton Bay General Store =

- U.S. National Register of Historic Places
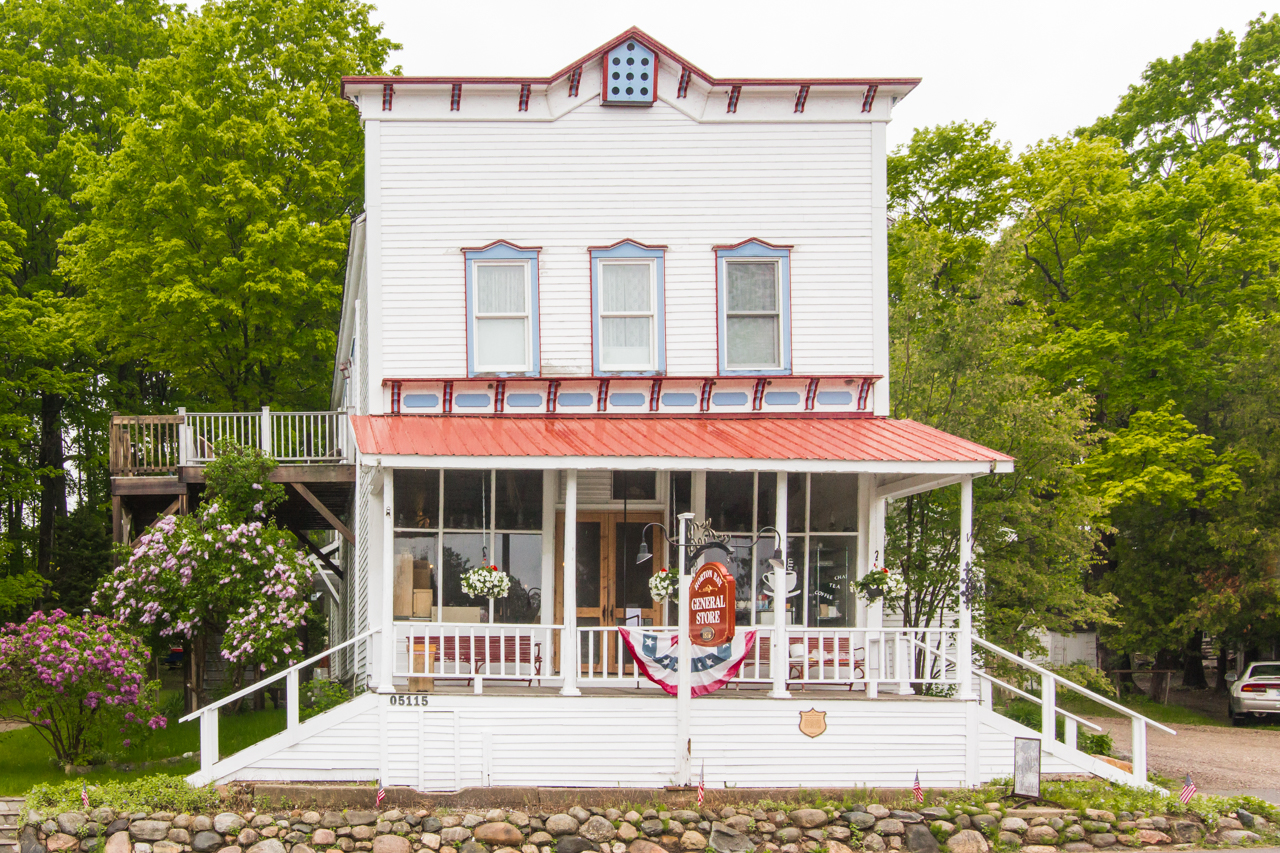

- Location within Michigan Location within the United States
- Interactive map
- Location: 05115 Boyne City Rd., Bay Township, Horton Bay, Michigan
- Coordinates: 45°17′6″N 85°4′48″W
- Area: less than one acre
- Built: 1877
- Built by: William Ohle
- Architectural style: Late Victorian
- NRHP reference No.: 91001411
- Added to NRHP: September 23, 1991

The Horton Bay General Store is a commercial building located at 05115 Boyne City Road in Horton Bay, Michigan. It was listed in the National Register of Historic Places in 1991. The store is mentioned in two of Ernest Hemingway's short stories, "Up in Michigan" and "The Last Good Country."

== History ==
In 1870, Horton Bay's founder Samuel Horton established a homestead at this site. In 1876, Alonzo J. Stroud and William H. Ohle set up a sawmill near here and were soon employing up to 30 workers. With the influx of workers, Horton Bay quickly grew into a small community, and the need for a general store and other services soon became apparent. William H. Ohle withdrew from the sawmill business and concentrated on real estate and construction in the new community. Tradition has it that Ohle supervised the construction of the Horton Bay General Store, as well as many other early buildings in the community (including the next-door boardinghouse, now the Red Fox Inn. The General Store was likely built in 1876 or 1877.

The store was constructed as a typical late nineteenth-century general store. The entire first floor carried a general stock of groceries, hardware, clothing, and other products, while the second floor served as living quarters for the proprietor. In 1879, the first post office for Horton Bay was located in the store.

The store has operated more or less continuously since its construction. Alonzo Stroud owned the store from 1890 - 1894. He sold it to his clerk Conrad Schneider, who operated it for over ten years until selling it to Merton Fox in 1904. During the Great Depression, Ben and Margaret Belnap owned the store, and in 1972, Harriet Housel and her parents, George and Betty, took over ownership. Claudia and Chip Lorenger purchased the store in the early 2000s, and own it until 2021 when purchased by Molly McCoy and Greg Cummings, Jr.

== Description ==
The Horton Bay General Store is a rectangular gable-front two-story frame Late Victorian commercial building, clad in clapboard, on a fieldstone foundation. It has a symmetrical, falsefront facade with an upper cornice containing a central triangular pediment. The storefront contains a centrally located, recessed doorway flanked by display windows. A storefront cornice with supporting bracketry is located at the point where the porch roof meets the facade.

On the interior, the first story contains much of the original store interior finish, including a board ceiling, the original floor, some of the shelving units, and one sales counter. Several carbide and kerosene lamps are still in their locations. On the second floor, the living quarters have been extensively modernized.
