= Middleburg Historic District =

Middleburg Historic District may refer to:

- Middleburg Historic District (Middleburg, Florida), listed on the NRHP in Florida
- Middleburg Historic District (Middleburg, Virginia), listed on the NRHP in Virginia

== See also ==
- Middleburg Plantation, listed on the NRHP in Huger, South Carolina
