= The End of Something =

1925 short story by Ernest Hemingway

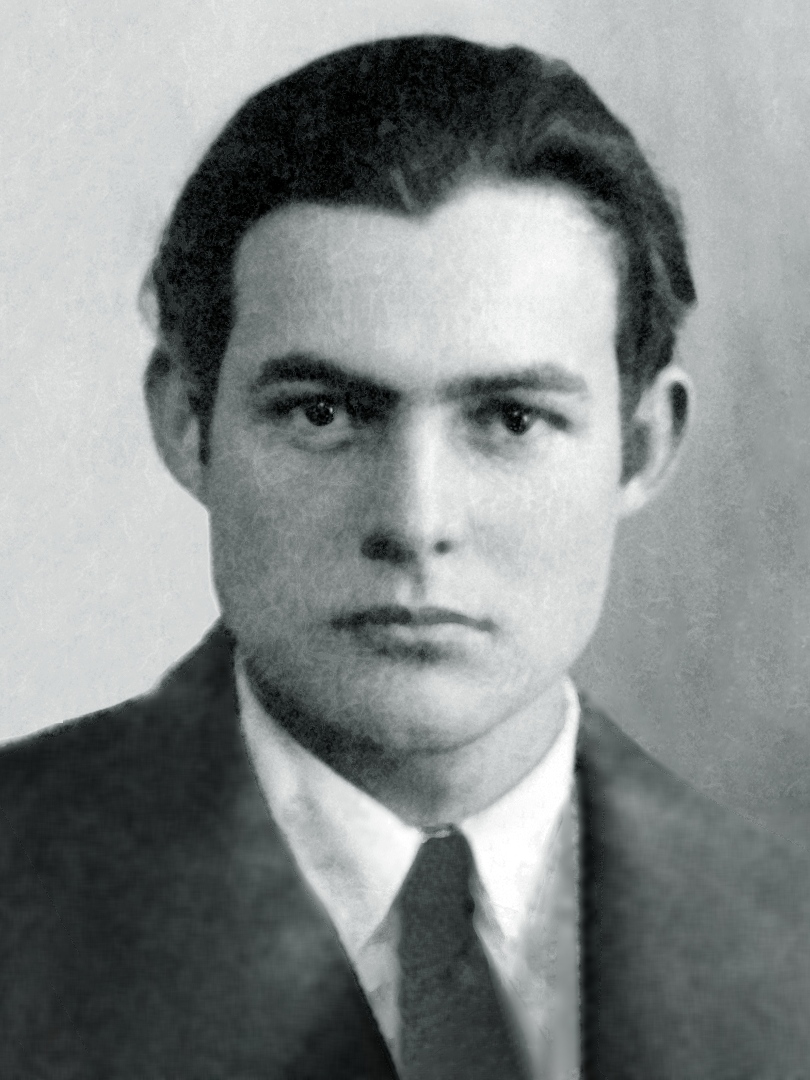
Ernest Hemingway in 1923

"The End of Something" is a short story written by Ernest Hemingway, published in the 1925 New York edition of In Our Time, by Boni & Liveright. The story is the third in the collection to feature Nick Adams, Hemingway's autobiographical alter ego.

== Publication history ==
According to notes on the manuscript, Hemingway wrote “The End of Something” in March 1924. Paul Smith claimed that based on the different kinds of paper used for the manuscript, it is possible that the story had “an earlier start”. “The End of Something” was published in 1925 in Hemingway's first collection of short stories, In Our Time. In May 1925, F. Scott Fitzgerald reviewed In Our Time for Bookman, and called “The End of Something” “something fundamentally new.” Critics received the collection well, and “The End of Something” has been called a “harbinger of stories to come”.

== Synopsis ==
“The End of Something” begins with a description of Hortons Bay, Michigan, a town that exists because of the lumber industry. Once the logs disappear, the lumber mill does, too, taking away “everything that had made… Hortons Bay a town.” By the time of the story, the town is deserted, and only the white limestone foundation of the mill is left. In this setting, Nick Adams and Marjorie, two teenagers in a relationship, fish in a small boat. While Marjorie daydreams that the remains of the mill are like a castle, Nick expresses his frustration over their unsuccessful fishing. The two then set up long lines and fish from the shore. Sitting by a driftwood fire the pair made, Marjorie asks Nick what is bothering him, and Nick expresses that “It isn’t fun anymore.” Marjorie recognizes his words as the end of the relationship and leaves, while Nick lies face down on a blanket. When Nick's friend Bill arrives to ask how the breakup went, he proves that Nick had previously planned the breakup. When Nick yells at Bill to go away, however, Nick shows dissatisfaction with his decision.

== Characters ==
- Nick Adams is a recurring character throughout this collection and other works by Hemingway. Considered an autobiographical character for Hemingway, Nick experiences the many struggles of coming of age throughout Hemingway's works.
- Marjorie is Nick's girlfriend. Like Nick, she exhibits an appreciation for fishing.
- Bill is Nick's friend who encouraged Nick to end his relationship with Marjorie. Bill appears again in "The Three-Day Blow”.

== Autobiographical elements ==
Many literary analysts have noted the connection of “The End of Something” to events in Hemingway's life. In Ernest Hemingway: A Life Story, Carlos Baker notes that Hemingway had “a brief romance with Marjorie Bump, at Horton Bay in the summer of 1919.” H.R. Stoneback provided an explanation for the autobiographical elements of the story in his essay “'Nothing was ever lost': Another Look at 'That Marge Business'". Stoneback claimed that “Marge and Hemingway met long before the summer of 1919.” According to Stoneback, Marjorie came to Horton Bay to visit her uncle, Professor Ernest L. Ohle of Washington University in St. Louis, who had his summer cottage there.” William Ohle in “How it was in Horton Bay” explained that Hemingway and Marge met in 1915 when Marge “was walking back from the creek to her uncle’s house, a speckled trouth on a stringer in one hand and a long cane pole in the other.” Bernice Kert described Marge as “softly vulnerable and good-natured, the right degree of woman for Ernest.” Stoneback disdained such quaint descriptions of the real-life Marjorie. He claimed that the “competence, skill, discipline, humility, pride, and poise” shown by Marge in the story reflected the Marjorie Hemingway knew.

== Analysis ==
According to Lisa Tyler, the opening description "represents a vivid (if disturbing) metaphor for the relationship Nick and Marjorie share,” and Paul Smith claims the use of a descriptive and symbolic introduction is rather common in writing, but this does not reduce the introduction's usefulness in conveying the state of Marjorie and Nick's relationship at the beginning of the story. In “False Wilderness”, Frederic Svoboda emphasizes the significance of the description of the old lumber town, writing that “Horton Bay in Hemingway’s time was hardly the ghost town of “The End of Something”. While the lumber mills indeed had moved away... the village was not abandoned. It was rather a small summer resort.” Laura Gruber Godfrey agrees that “The End of Something” shows “the careful interweaving of human characters with their communities and their landscapes.” In losing the mill, the town lost the linchpin that held it together, so when Nick and Marjorie row by ten years later, “there was nothing of the mill left except the broken white limestone of its foundations.”

Tyler writes that Nick's behavior towards Marjorie can be compared with loggers in Michigan, that “Nick, like the loggers, is all too aware of the damage he is doing”. She writes that “Hemingway uses the imagery of an irreparably damaged environment in “The End of Something” and elsewhere throughout the stories of In Our Time to link violence against nature with other forms of violence depicted in that collection, including violence against... women,... suggesting that he was more ecofeminist in his sympathies that his readers have yet acknowledged.”

According to Tyler, Marjorie’s questioning proves her “sensitivity to Nick’s emotional state.” Some analysts, like Gerry Brenner, interpret the Bill interlude as expressing Hemingway's “latent homoeroticism.” Smith takes a different route from Stoneback in claiming that Bill and Marjorie are “disembodied representations of a conflict within [Nick’s] mind,” but his analysis is also consistent with Nick's expression of his inner hell.

== Sources ==
- Baker, Carlos. Ernest Hemingway: A Life Story. New York: Scribner, 1969.
- Brenner, Gerry. Concealments In Hemingway's Works. Columbus:Ohio State University Press, 1983.
- Godfrey, Laura Gruber. "The Landscape of Logging in 'The End of Something.'” The Hemingway Review 26.1 (Fall 2006): 47–62.
- Hemingway, Ernest. The Complete Short Stories of Ernest Hemingway. New York:Simon & Schulster, 1987.
- Kert, Bernice. The Hemingway Women. New York: Norton, 1983.
- Ohle, William H.How it Was in Horton Bay. Charlevoix, MI, 1983.
- Oliver, Charles. (1999). Ernest Hemingway A to Z: The Essential Reference to the Life and Work. New York: Checkmark Publishing. ISBN 978-0-8160-3467-3
- Smith, Paul. "The End of Something,” A Reader's Guide to the Short Stories of Ernest Hemingway. Ed. James Nagel. Boston. G.K. Hall & Co, 1989.
- Stoneback, H.R. "'Nothing Was Ever Lost”: Another Look at 'That Marge Business,'” Hemingway: Up in Michigan Perspectives.” Ed. Frederick J. Svoboda and Joseph J. Waldmier. East Lansing: Michigan State University Press, 1995.
- Svoboda, Frederic J. "False Wilderness: Northern Michigan as Created in the Nick Adams Stories,” Hemingway: Up in Michigan Perspectives. Ed. Frederick J. Svoboda and Joseph J. Waldmier. East Lansing: Michigan State University Press, 1995.
- Tetlow, Wendolyn E. (1992). Hemingway's "In Our Time”: Lyrical Dimensions. Cranbury NJ: Associated University Presses. ISBN 978-0-8387-5219-7
- Tyler, Lisa. "'How Beautiful the Virgin Forests Were Before the Loggers Came': an Ecofeminist's Reading of Hemingway's 'End of Something.'” The Hemingway Review (Spring 2008).
