= Unison, Virginia =

Unincorporated community in Virginia, United States

- Unincorporated community
- Location within Northern Virginia Location within Virginia Location within the United States
- Coordinates: 39°2′6″N 77°47′26″W
- Country: United States
- State: Virginia
- County: Loudoun
- Elevation: 482 ft (147 m)
- Time zone: UTC−5 (Eastern (EST))
  - Summer (DST): UTC−4 (EDT)
- GNIS feature ID: 1477830

Unison is an unincorporated village in Loudoun County, Virginia, United States. It is located approximately five miles from Middleburg in the Loudoun Valley close to the Fauquier County border.

== History ==
Founded in about 1740 by Quakers who had migrated down from Pennsylvania, via Maryland and across the Potomac to the fertile farmlands of Northern Virginia, the village and its surrounds - later to become known as Union, and then Unison - was referred to as "Greenland" or "Butterland" in early 1800s deeds. The name "Butterland" was said to have come about as a nod to the Royal taxes at the time being collected in pounds of butter, rather than coin.

In 1813 Virginia's General Assembly chartered the village as the Town of Union. That same year the federal government established the Union Post Office, discontinued twice in its early years, from 1820 to 1824, and in 1828. The post office was reestablished in 1829 under Union's new name of Unison which was forced on the town largely because Monroe Court House in Monroe County, Virginia had taken the name Union a few years prior, even though its own post office had been established 4 years after Loudoun's Union post office. Unfortunately for Loudoun's Union, Monroe County got preferred treatment because their courthouse was situated in their town of Union.

By the 1830s Unison was the 4th largest town in Loudoun County. Yardley Taylor, writing for Joseph Martin's Gazetteer of Virginia in 1835, used the old name "Union" to identify Unison and counted 25 dwellings, 3 houses of worship, a school, 2 general stores, a blacksmith, and a tavern. Among the 135 inhabitants there were a number of professionals including a lawyer and 3 physicians.

As the prospect of a civil war loomed on the horizon at the opening of the 1860s, the last vote of the Unison Precinct on May 23, 1861 - a count to affirm Virginia's secession from the Federal Union - was 150–0, the largest shutout vote for secession in the county. All the Quaker pacifists had remained home during the voting, so their voices against secession remained silent.

Between October 31 and November 2, 1862, the village was the scene of several skirmishes between Confederate cavalry under J.E.B. Stuart and Union cavalry, infantry and artillery in what is now known as the Battle of Unison. Because Stuart's delaying tactics at Unison cost the Federals time, a major portion of Lee's force had crossed the Blue Ridge, reached Culpeper and now had time to regroup and prepare for the next major encounter between the two sides at Fredericksburg. Lee's army and his capital were saved. On November 5, 1862, the New York Times correspondent reported "Stuart . . . balked what might have been a splendid success".

After the war Unison remained Loudoun County's 4th largest town for only a few more years. By the late 1870s towns along the railroad line running through western Loudoun County, which missed Unison by 8 miles, saw their populations boom, and soon outstripped Unison in both commercial and population importance. Unison's post office remained until 1919 when the mails were discontinued to the town, the post office was closed, and mail delivery moved to the post office in nearby town of Round Hill which was served by the Washington and Old Dominion Railroad. However, even into the middle of the 20th century, Unison maintained itself as a viable town with its own churches, general store, and a saddle shop, and even a baseball team that played in the Loudoun baseball leagues. By the 1980s the town had been in decline, too far away from the new highways that now carried the bulk of Loudoun's commerce and population. By the 1990s the town had become little more than a sleepy residential enclave with only 50 permanent residences and 14 or so houses. The last retail enterprise, the Unison Store, a general store that had been in continuous business since 1880, closed in August 1996.

In 2001 the vacant Unison Store building was being considered by a buyer as a tear down. This news prompted a local gathering of residents to attempt to save the building. They formed a 501[c]3 non-profit group, incorporated as "The Unison Preservation Society", their stated goal to help protect and preserve the historic village and surrounding countryside of Unison. As a result of their efforts Unison was placed on the Virginia Landmarks Register in 2002 as the Unison Historic District, and on the National Register of Historic Places in 2003. The store was purchased at highest bid by a local business at a public auction in 2001, and the building subsequently renovated. It was used as an office business until April 2013 when the building was again sold. It was purchased this time by a local philanthropist, Dr. Betsee Parker, owner of Huntlands, who then gifted the building to the Unison Preservation Society. The old Unison Store is now a community center, serving the village and the surrounding area.

On Sept. 22, 2011, due to the successful efforts of the Unison Preservation Society's research and documentation into the important historical significance of the battles and skirmishes that took place in and around the Unison area, Virginia added further buildings and acreage to the Virginia Landmarks register and nominated the 8,000-acre Unison Battlefield Historic District for inclusion on the National Register of Historic Places.

The population count of Unison is now about 30, greatly outnumbered by the horses in the surrounding farms. The village contains a single United Methodist Church, and a number of private home businesses.
