= Bay Township, Michigan =

- Civil township
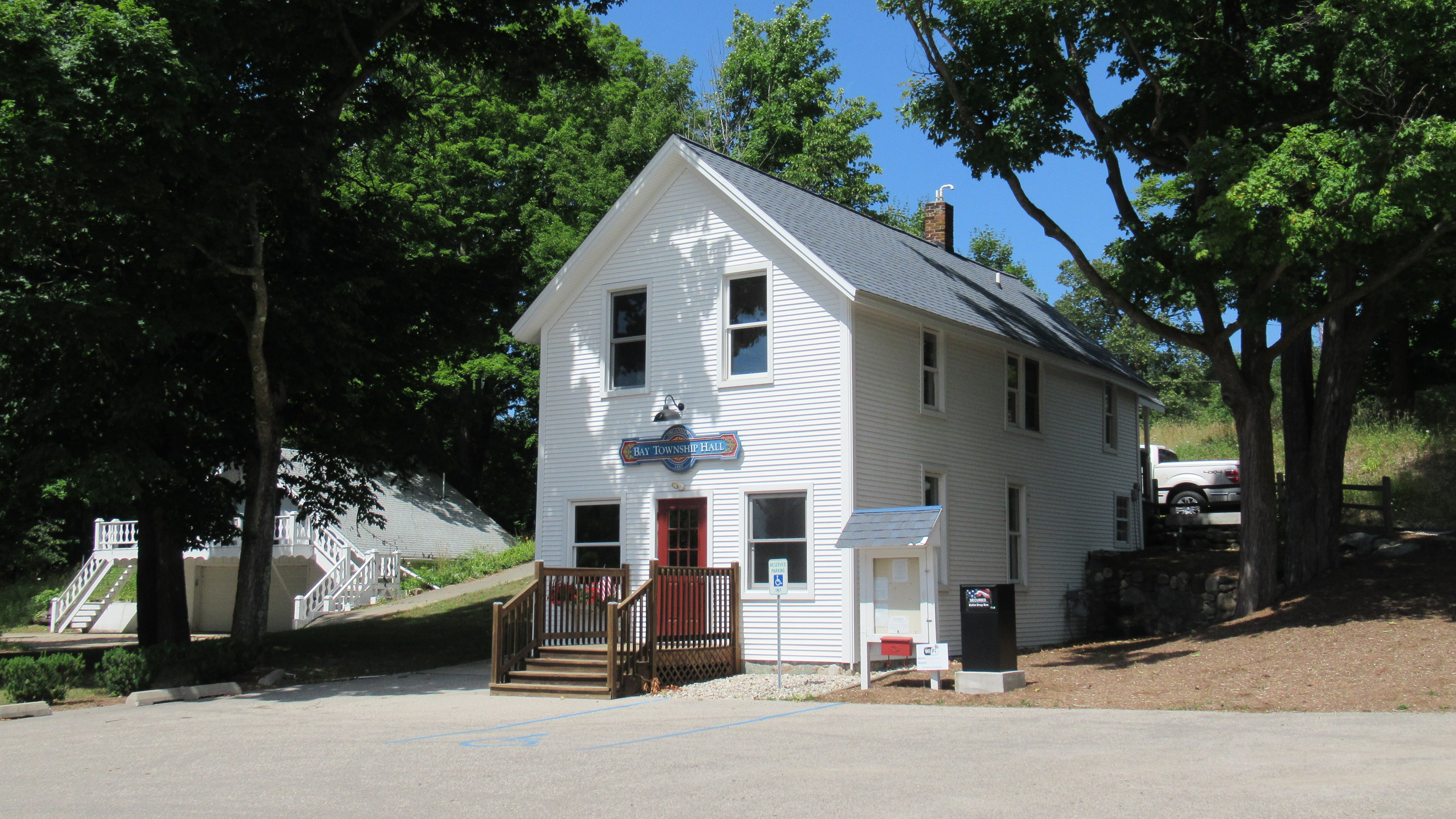
- Bay Township Hall in Horton Bay

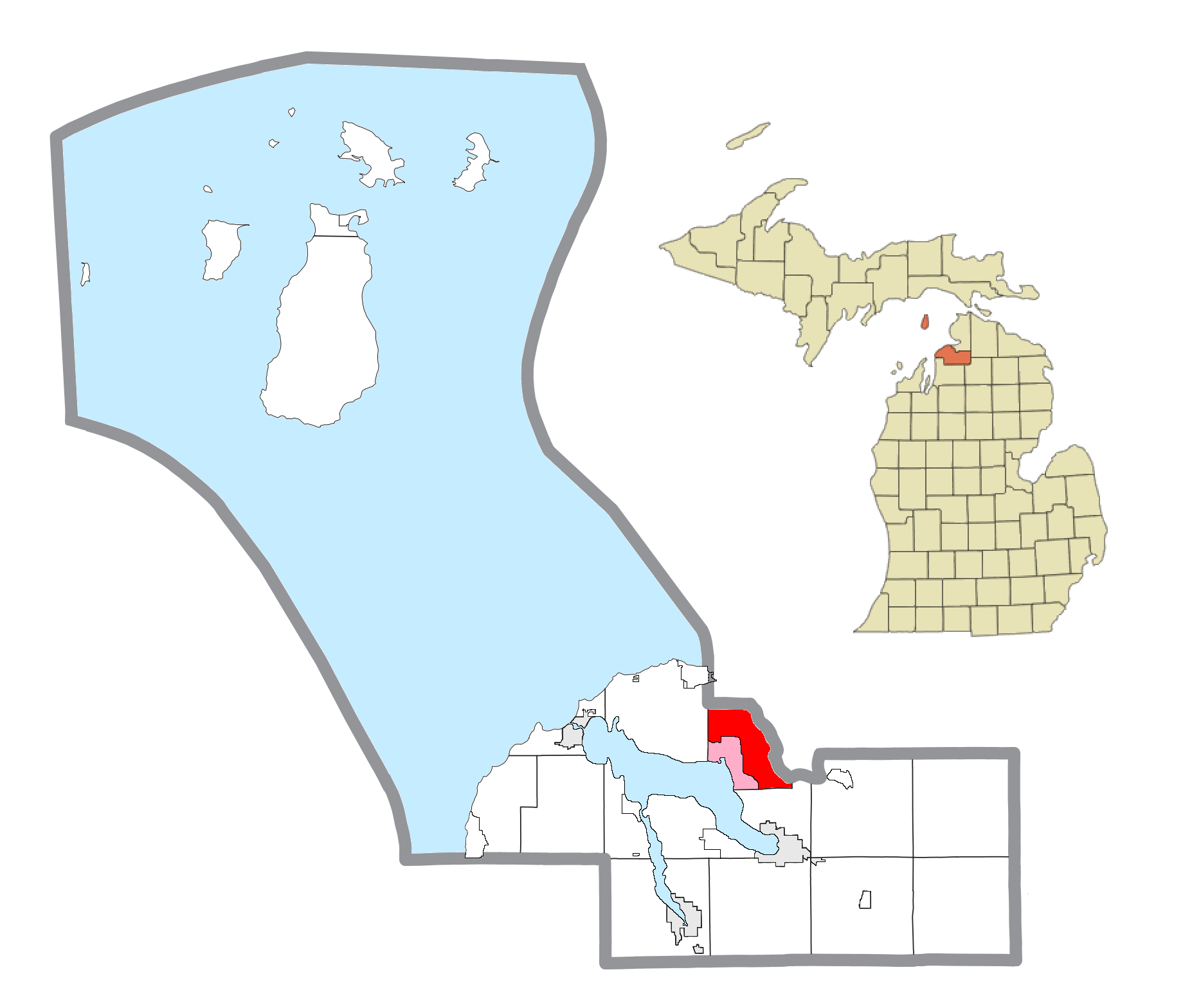
- Location within Charlevoix County (red) and the administered CDP of Horton Bay (pink)

- Location within the state of Michigan Bay Township (the United States)
- Coordinates: 45°17′39″N 85°04′11″W
- Country: United States
- State: Michigan
- County: Charlevoix
- Established: 1887

Area
  - Total: 18.89 sq mi (48.92 km^{2})
  - Land: 15.55 sq mi (40.27 km^{2})
  - Water: 3.34 sq mi (8.65 km^{2})
- Elevation: 846 ft (258 m)

Population (2020)
  - Total: 1,142
  - Density: 73.45/sq mi (28.36/km^{2})
- Time zone: UTC-5 (Eastern (EST))
  - Summer (DST): UTC-4 (EDT)
- ZIP code(s): 49712 (Boyne City); 49720 (Charlevoix); 49770 (Petoskey)
- Area code: 231
- FIPS code: 26-06000
- GNIS feature ID: 1625891
- Website: Official website

Bay Township is a civil township of Charlevoix County, Michigan, United States. The population was 1,142 at the 2020 census.

Bay Township was established in 1887. The township contains the census-designated place of Horton Bay. The community and surrounding area were featured in several stories by Ernest Hemingway, particularly the Nick Adams stories including "The End of Something".

== Communities ==
- Horton Bay is an unincorporated community and census-designated place located within the township at 45°17′04″N 85°04′45″W.
- Zenith Heights is an unincorporated community located within the township at 45°18′22″N 85°02′08″W.

== Geography ==
According to the U.S. Census Bureau, Bay Township has a total area of 18.89 square miles (48.92 km^{2}), of which 15.55 square miles (40.27 km^{2}) is land and 3.34 square miles (8.65 km^{2}) (17.68%) is water.

Bay Township is located between Lake Charlevoix and Walloon Lake.

=== Major highways ===
- C-56 (Boyne City Road) runs through the township near Lake Charlevoix and through the community of Horton Bay.
- C-71 (Horton Bay Road) runs north from C-56 and connects to US 31 north of the township.

== Demographics ==
Historical population
Census	Pop.	Note	%±
2000	1,068		—
2010	1,122		5.1%
2020	1,142		1.8%

As of the census of 2000, there were 1,068 people, 429 households, and 326 families residing in the township. The population density was 68.8 inhabitants per square mile (26.6/km^{2}). There were 787 housing units at an average density of 50.7 per square mile (19.6/km^{2}). The racial makeup of the township was 97.28% White, 0.47% Native American, 0.56% Asian, 0.56% Pacific Islander, 0.28% from other races, and 0.84% from two or more races. Hispanic or Latino of any race were 0.56% of the population.

There were 429 households, out of which 29.4% had children under the age of 18 living with them, 68.1% were married couples living together, 4.7% had a female householder with no husband present, and 23.8% were non-families. 21.2% of all households were made up of individuals, and 8.4% had someone living alone who was 65 years of age or older. The average household size was 2.49 and the average family size was 2.86.

In the township the population was spread out, with 24.2% under the age of 18, 3.5% from 18 to 24, 26.5% from 25 to 44, 30.7% from 45 to 64, and 15.2% who were 65 years of age or older. The median age was 43 years. For every 100 females, there were 112.3 males. For every 100 females age 18 and over, there were 105.6 males.

The median income for a household in the township was $48,462, and the median income for a family was $55,268. Males had a median income of $38,462 versus $28,558 for females. The per capita income for the township was $25,594. About 1.8% of families and 4.9% of the population were below the poverty line, including 5.8% of those under age 18 and 2.3% of those age 65 or over.

== Education ==
Bay Township is served entirely by Boyne City Public Schools to the southeast in Boyne City.
