= Wexford (Marshall, Virginia) =

American ranch in Blue Ridge Mountains

- Location within Virginia Location within the United States
- Location: Marshall, Virginia, United States
- Nearest city: Middleburg, Virginia
- Coordinates: 38°57′54″N 77°47′50″W
- Area: 167 acres (68 ha)

Wexford, also known as Kennedy Retreat at Rattlesnake Ridge, is a 167-acre (0.67 km^{2}) ranch amid the Blue Ridge Mountains in unincorporated Marshall, Virginia, located 4 miles (6 km) northwest from Middleburg (about 50 miles (80 km) from Washington, D.C.). The property was acquired, designed, and named by Jacqueline Kennedy in 1962 as a weekend retreat during John F. Kennedy's presidency. Its namesake is the ancestral home of the Kennedy family. Following their visit to Wexford (Ireland) in June 1963, Éamon de Valera gifted 3-year old John F. Kennedy Jr. a pony, which was stabled at Wexford (ranch). It is the only home John and Jacqueline built together during their marriage, and was the last place they vacationed before his assassination in November 1963. John Jr. practiced his father's iconic final salute at Wexford.

Ronald Reagan leased Wexford from William Clements for his residence and headquarters during the 1980 Presidential Campaign. It is the only private retreat used by more than one President of the United States (many presidents have used the state-owned Camp David).

== History ==
Following victory in the 1960 Presidential Campaign, John and Jacqueline Kennedy began looking for a weekend retreat to "get their children out of the governmental atmosphere". Jacqueline favored the Atoka, Virginia area because of the proximity to D.C. (25 minutes by helicopter and 1 hour by automobile) and her familiarity from childhood through equestrianism and staying with her stepfather at Merrywood. Atoka is also approximately 40 miles from the Kennedy's first marital home, Hickory Hill.

From February 1961–1963, the Kennedy's leased Glen Ora, a 400-acre ranch in Atoka, from Gladys Byfield Tartiere. Jacqueline, Caroline, and John Jr. sheltered there during the Cuban Missile Crisis. Gladys turned down the Kennedy's offer to acquire Glena Ora in the spring of 1962. Shortly after, they acquired 39 acres approximately 5 miles northeast at the base of Rattlesnake Mountain from Hubert Phipps for $26,000 ($222,000 as of 2020).

Throughout 1962, Jackie worked with local architect Keith Williams to design a single-story, 4-bedroom, 2-staffroom, 5,050 squarefoot house. It was equipped with a bomb shelter and communication facility. Construction was completed in the spring of 1963 totalling $110,000 ($930,000 as of 2020). While Jackie regularly visited throughout construction, John's first trip was May 25. He visited again on October 25, and finally on November 2; the last location their family vacationed.

One year after John's assassination, Jackie sold Wexford to Quing Non Wong on November 25, 1964 for $225,000 ($1,878,000 as of 2020). In 1971, Quing sold Wexford to Dr. George Tanham for $314,000 ($2,006,000 as of 2020). In 1975, George sold Wexford to William Clements who added a pool and tennis court. It was listed in 2013 for $10,999,000, reduced to $5,959,000 in 2016, and finally sold in 2017 to Thomas S. Price for $2,850,000.

== See also ==
- List of residences of presidents of the United States
