= Benton (Middleburg, Virginia) =

Historic house in Virginia, United States

- U.S. National Register of Historic Places
- Virginia Landmarks Register
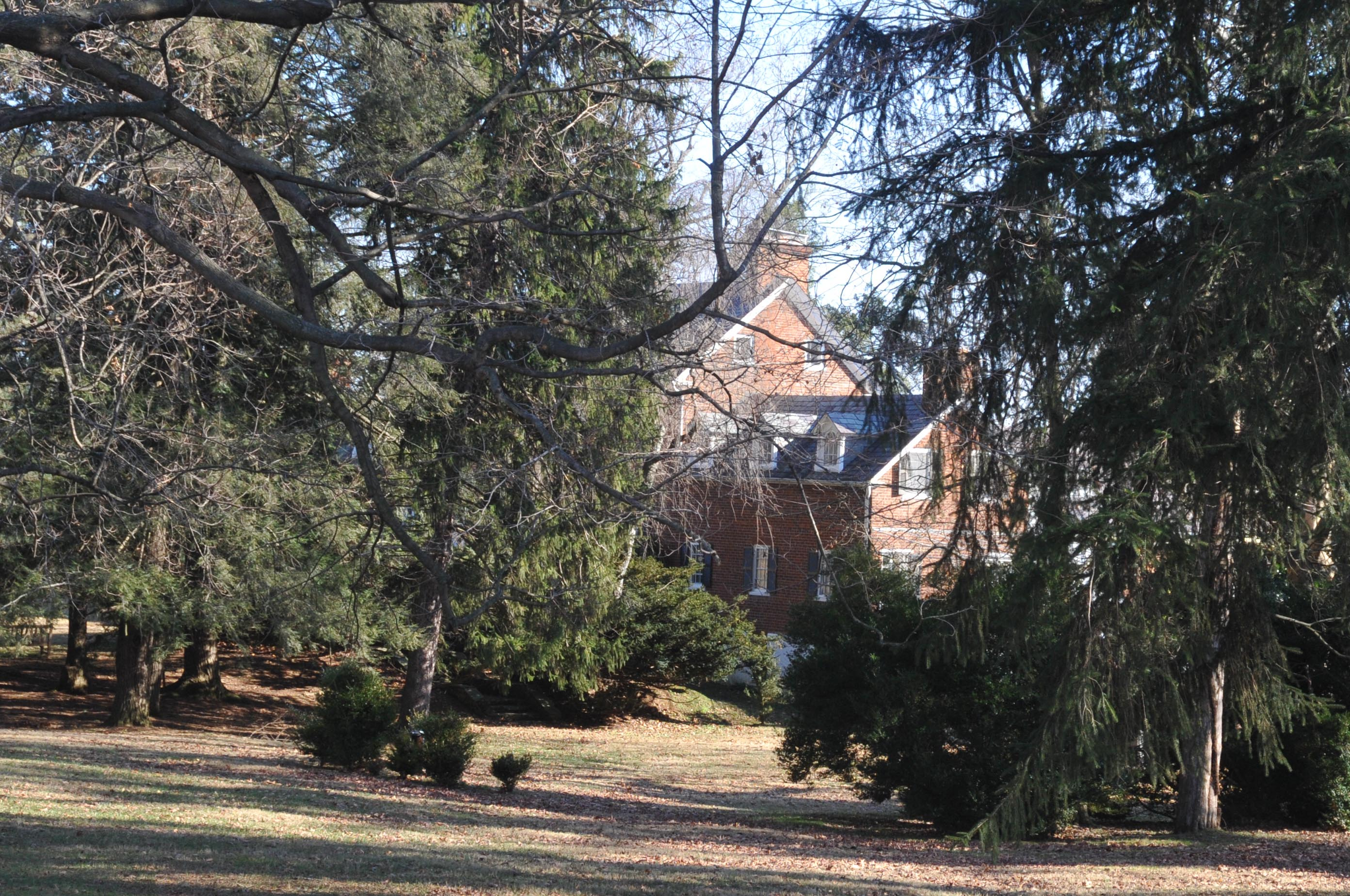

- Location within Northern Virginia Location within Virginia Location within the United States
- Location: VA 774, near Middleburg, Virginia
- Coordinates: 39°0′10.72″N 77°45′58.02″W
- Area: 13.2 acres (5.3 ha)
- Built: 1830
- Built by: Benton, William
- Architectural style: Federal
- NRHP reference No.: 84003545
- VLR No.: 053-0107

Significant dates
- Added to NRHP: June 14, 1984
- Designated VLR: May 17, 1983

Benton, also known as Spring Hill, is a house in Loudoun County, Virginia, near Middleburg. The house was built by William Benton, a brickmaker and builder, around 1831. Benton had made a journey to Wales to collect an inheritance shortly after 1822 and there saw a house that he admired and wished to replicate on his own lands. He called the house "Spring Hill."

== Description ==
The two-story house is a Federal style structure with five bays and a center hall. Wings of three bays flank the main block. The first floor windows have been altered from six-over-six sash windows to French windows with sills close to the floor. The main entrance features double doors with sidelights and a fanlight above, which are also twentieth century alterations. The present entry replaced a small portico. The center second floor window was probably changed at this time as well, along with the dormers on the wings. The rear elevation is closer to the original. The interior is one room deep with large rooms flanking the center hall, which contains the stairs. The interior woodwork is largely original and is noteworthy.

The house has several dependencies, including flanking outbuildings. The west dependency, called the "laundry house," is a 1 1/2-story brick building with two bays, a center chimney and an end chimney. The smaller east dependency may have been a smokehouse. The property features a large 33-foot (10 m) by 110-foot (34 m) brick barn of three stories, with an attached tenant house.

== History ==
Benton continued to work as a brickmaker and builder after the construction of the house, and was employed by James Madison among others. The Bentons retained the property until 1894, when it was purchased by Joshua Hatcher, who sold to Daniel Sands in 1908. Sands undertook renovations, established extensive gardens and changed the name to "Benton." Sands bought surrounding acreage and established a prominent horse farm on the property. The house and 13 acres (5.3 ha) were sold to Mr. and Mrs. James Nicklin in 1954, who sold to Mr. and Mrs. William T. Leith in 1961.

Benton was placed on the National Register of Historic Places on June 14, 1984.
