= Much Haddam =

Historic house in Virginia, United States

- U.S. National Register of Historic Places
- Virginia Landmarks Register
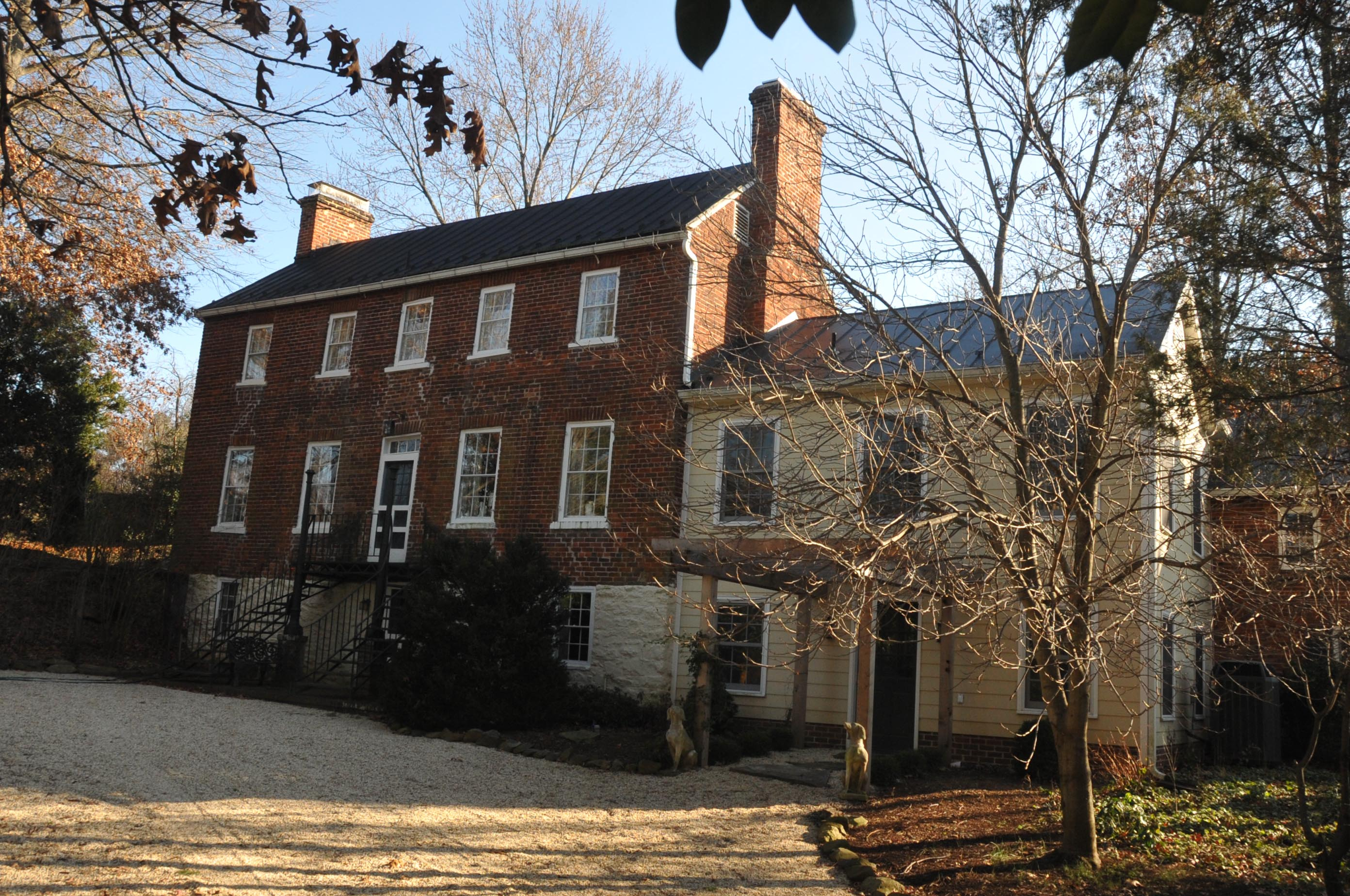

- Location within Northern Virginia Location within Virginia Location within the United States
- Location: US 50 W of jct. with VA 626, Middleburg, Virginia
- Coordinates: 38°58′0″N 77°44′33″W
- Area: 5.4 acres (2.2 ha)
- Built: 1820
- Built by: Richard Cochran
- Architectural style: Federal, I-house
- NRHP reference No.: 90001988
- VLR No.: 259-0164

Significant dates
- Added to NRHP: December 28, 1990
- Designated VLR: April 17, 1990

Much Haddam is a Federal style brick house, built about 1820 just outside Middleburg, Virginia by Richard Cochran. The two-story brick house is located on the Ashby's Gap Turnpike, near the west end of Middleburg, and is a prominent landmark to those approaching Middleburg from the west.

== History ==
Cochran built Much Haddam on lands next to his property, which he called "Capitol Hill." The house was apparently a speculative venture, since Cochran sold it immediately upon completion to William Swart. Swart sold the house to William F. Broaddus in 1835, who sold it on to Mary P. Waugh in 1840. Waugh sold in 1866 to Robert C. Leechman, followed by several more owners. In 1966 the house was purchased by Emily N. K. Church Hutchinson, who named the house Much Haddam.

== Description ==
Much Haddam is a five-bay center-hall house. The two-story brick house stands on a prominent stone basement when seen from the downhill side of its sloping site. The roof is standing seam metal. An ell from the rear was originally one story, but was raised to two stories at the beginning of the twentieth century. The ell once had a log extension, which has disappeared. The grounds include an unusual two-story kitchen outbuilding.

Much Haddam was placed on the National Register of Historic Places on December 28, 1990.
