= Mill House (Middleburg, Virginia) =

Historic house in Virginia, United States

- U.S. National Register of Historic Places
- Virginia Landmarks Register
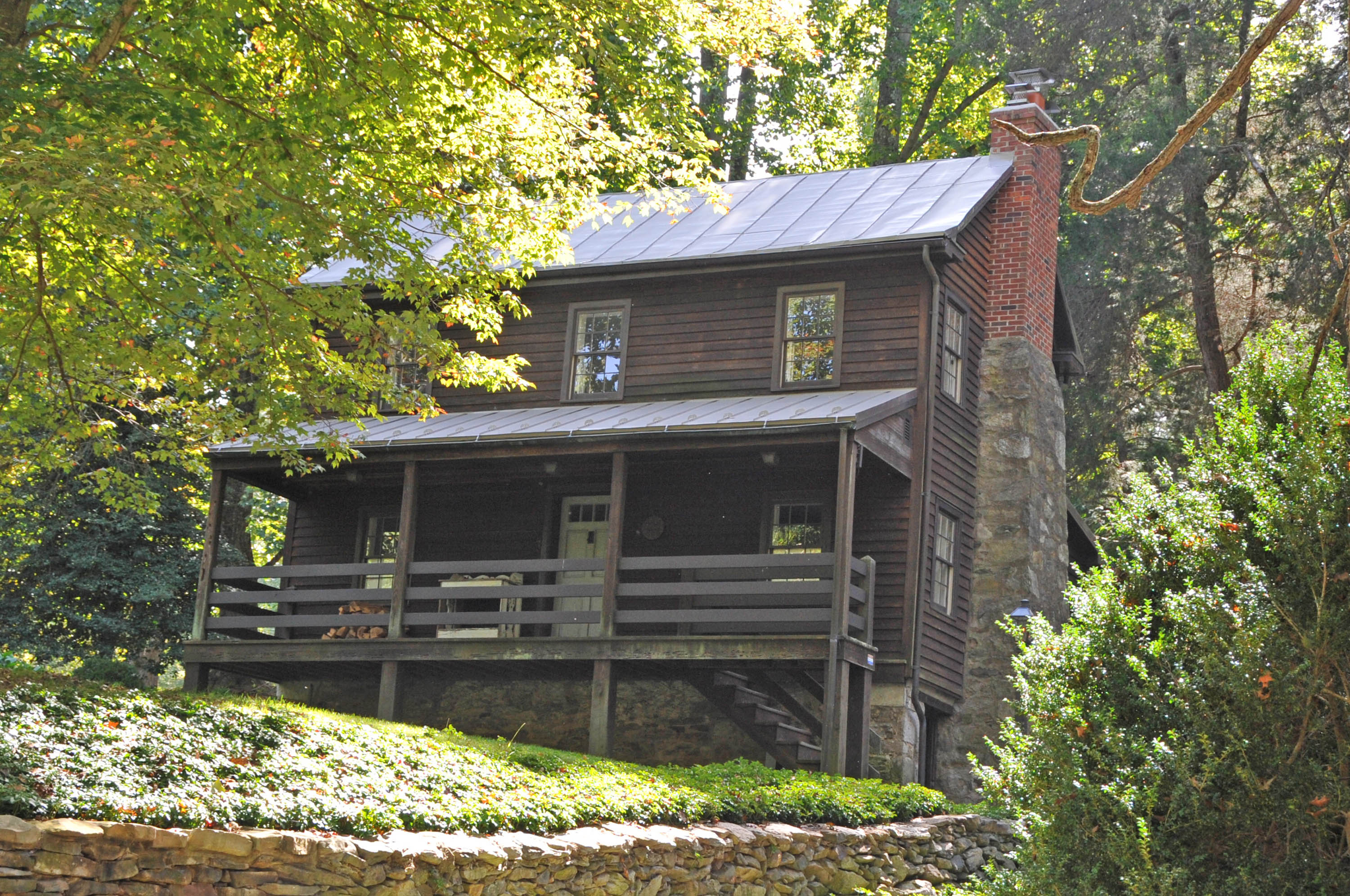

- Location within Northern Virginia Location within Virginia Location within the United States
- Location: US 50, near Middleburg, Virginia
- Coordinates: 38°58′11″N 77°47′32″W
- Area: 47.7 acres (19.3 ha)
- Built: c. 1800
- NRHP reference No.: 84003527
- VLR No.: 030-0659

Significant dates
- Added to NRHP: January 12, 1984
- Designated VLR: June 21, 1983

Mill House, also known as Chinn's Mill and Hatcher's Mill, is a historic grist mill complex located near Middleburg, Fauquier County, Virginia. All of the buildings in the complex are constructed of stone laid in a random-rubble pattern and some are of mixed stone and frame construction. They represent a late 18th- to early 19th-century rural Virginia grist mill operation, that was later transformed during the early-20th-century into a "hunt country" estate by John Shaffer Phipps. In addition to the mill itself, the complex includes the miller's house, the cooper's house and shop, the mill owner's house, and what was likely a dairy/smokehouse.

It was listed on the National Register of Historic Places in 1984.
