= Middleburg Historic District (Middleburg, Virginia) =

Historic district in Virginia, United States

- U.S. National Register of Historic Places
- U.S. Historic district
- Virginia Landmarks Register
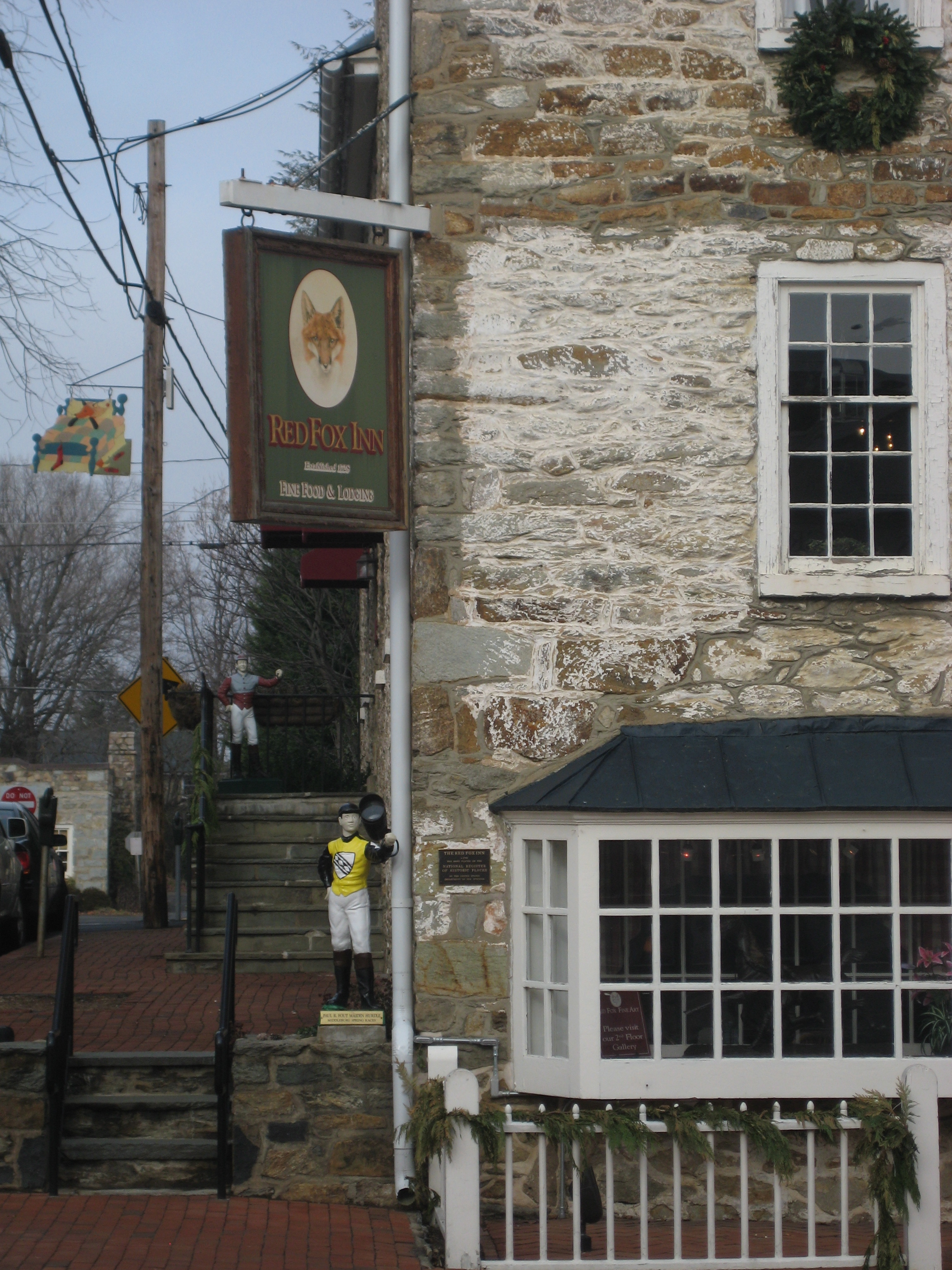
- The Red Fox Inn, part of the Middleburg Historic District

- Location within Northern Virginia Location within Virginia Location within the United States
- Location: US 50, VA 626 and 776, Middleburg, Virginia
- Coordinates: 38°58′08″N 77°44′09″W
- Area: 90 acres (36 ha)
- Architect: Multiple
- Architectural style: Federal, Gothic Revival
- NRHP reference No.: 82001823
- VLR No.: 259-0162

Significant dates
- Added to NRHP: October 29, 1982
- Designated VLR: December 15, 1981

The Middleburg Historic District comprises the historic center of Middleburg, Virginia. The district extends along the downtown section of Washington Street, and is flanked on the east by Independence Street and to the west by Constitution Street. The district's commercial area is along Washington and Madison Streets. Middleburg was established in 1787, but the historic district includes a few 18th-century structures, with most dating to the mid-19th century. The district includes the Red Fox Inn & Tavern, the oldest building in town and listed individually on the National Register of Historic Places. Most of the structures in the core of the district are Federal style townhouses.

The most notable house in the district is "Chestnut Hill", also known as "The Hill," a large Federal-style house sitting apart surrounded by lawns. The district also features four churches. Little development took place in Middleburg in the late 19th century, and the district includes no examples of Victorian architecture. The district does include a few early 20th-century commercial structures.

The Middleburg Historic District was placed on the National Register of Historic Places on October 29, 1982.
