= John L. Dagg =

American evangelist and educator (1794–1884)

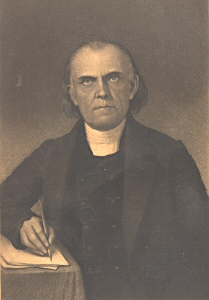
- Born: February 14, 1794; Middleburg, Virginia
- Died: June 11, 1884 (aged 90); Hayneville, Lowndes County, Alabama
- Resting place: Hayneville Cemetery, Hayneville, Alabama
- Occupations: Baptist clergyman, author, and president of Mercer University

John Leadley Dagg (1794–1884), born in Loudoun County, Virginia was an American Baptist theologian. He was associated with the Southern Baptists.

== Biography ==
Dagg had a limited education, was near-blind, and was physically disabled. He converted to Christianity at age 15 and served briefly in the War of 1812. Dagg was baptized in 1812 then studied medicine for three years. He was ordained as a minister in November 1817 and eventually served as the pastor of the Fifth Baptist Church in Philadelphia for nine years. He then moved to Tuscaloosa, Alabama and served as the president of the Alabama Female Athenaeum for eight years. Dagg left Tuscaloosa in January 1844 to become president of Mercer University. He served as president of Mercer until 1854, when his failing health forced him to retire. After retirement, Dagg authored four books. The first, Manual of Theology, was written in 1857 and was the first systematic theology written by a Baptist in America. His additional books included Treatise on Church Order (1858), Elements of Moral Science (1859), and Evidences of Christianity (1869). Dagg moved to Alabama to live near his daughter, where he died in Hayneville in 1884.

== Theology ==
John L. Dagg was a Calvinistic Baptist, holding to the five points settled at the council of Dort. Dagg also in his Treatise on Church Order writes considerably about baptism, the significance of it and its administration. There he concludes that the traditional Reformed arguments for infant baptism are very weak. He also writes on ecclesiology, however, he rejected the Landmarkist understanding of the church, instead believing in a universal church composed of all who have been saved by Christ.
