= Up in Michigan =

Short story by Ernest Hemingway

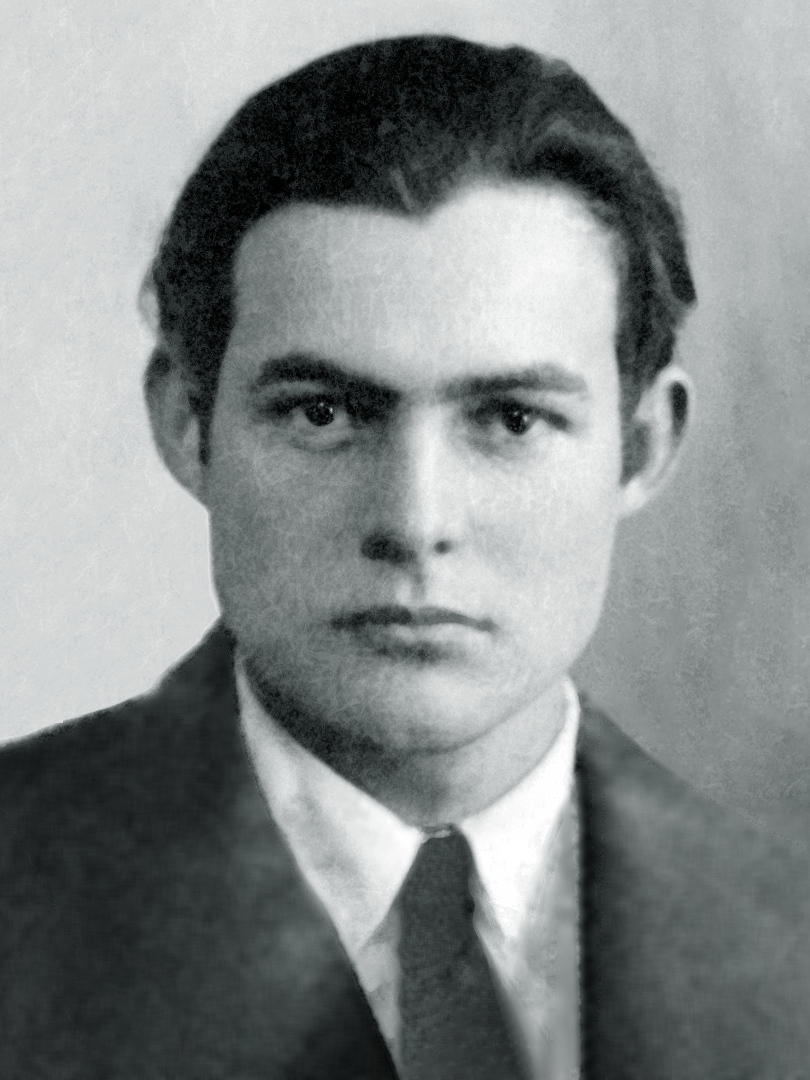
A cropped image of Ernest Hemingway's 1923 passport photograph.

"Up in Michigan" is a short story by American writer Ernest Hemingway, written in 1921 and revised in 1938. It is collected in Three Stories and Ten Poems (1923) and The Fifth Column and the First Forty-Nine Stories (1938).

== Publication history ==
"Up in Michigan" appeared in Ernest Hemingway's first published work, Three Stories and Ten Poems. Three hundred copies were printed in Paris by Robert McAlmon in 1923. It reappeared in 1938 in The Fifth Column and the First Forty-Nine Stories and later still in 1997 in The Short Stories, a Scribner Classic Edition. The story is set in Hortons Bay, Michigan, close to where Hemingway spent his adolescent summers.

== Plot summary ==
Jim Gilmore, a blacksmith, comes to Hortons Bay and buys the blacksmith shop. Liz Coates, who has a crush on Jim, is a young woman who works as a waitress for the Smiths. Jim, D. J. Smith, and Charley Wyman go on a deer-hunting trip. When the hunters return, they have a few drinks to celebrate their kill. After supper and a few more drinks, Jim goes into the kitchen and fondles Liz, and says, "Come on for a walk." They go to the end of the dock where Jim's hands explore Liz's body. She is frightened and begs him to stop. He forces himself upon her and passes out on top of her. She gets out from under him and tries to awaken him, and covers him with her coat.
