= Sgùrr a' Mhadaidh Ruaidh =

Summit on the Isle of Skye, Scottish Hebrides

Coordinates: 57.54524°N 6.22375°W

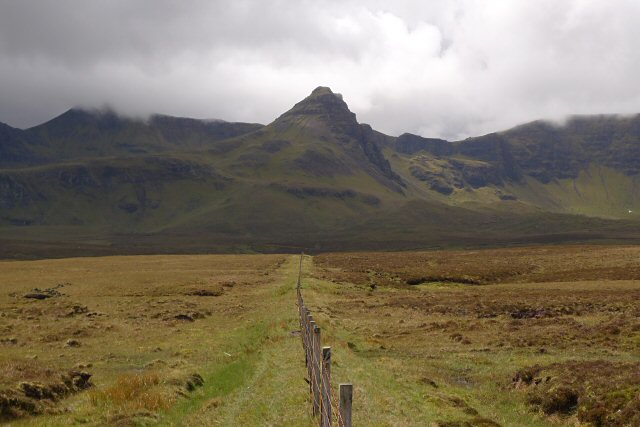
Sgùrr a' Mhadaidh Ruaidh

Sgùrr a' Mhadaidh Ruaidh (Gaelic for: Peak of the red fox) is a summit in the Trotternish range of hills in the north of the Isle of Skye, Scotland. It is located about ten kilometres south-east of Uig, and 15 kilometres north of Portree, at the point where the long ridge running from north to south down the Trotternish peninsula loops suddenly eastward. It is 593 m high, and its grid reference is NG474584.

The cultural importance of this landmark lies in part in that it gave its name to the novel The Hill of the Red Fox by Allan Campbell McLean.
