= Unison Historic District =

Historic district in Virginia, United States

- U.S. National Register of Historic Places
- U.S. Historic district
- Virginia Landmarks Register
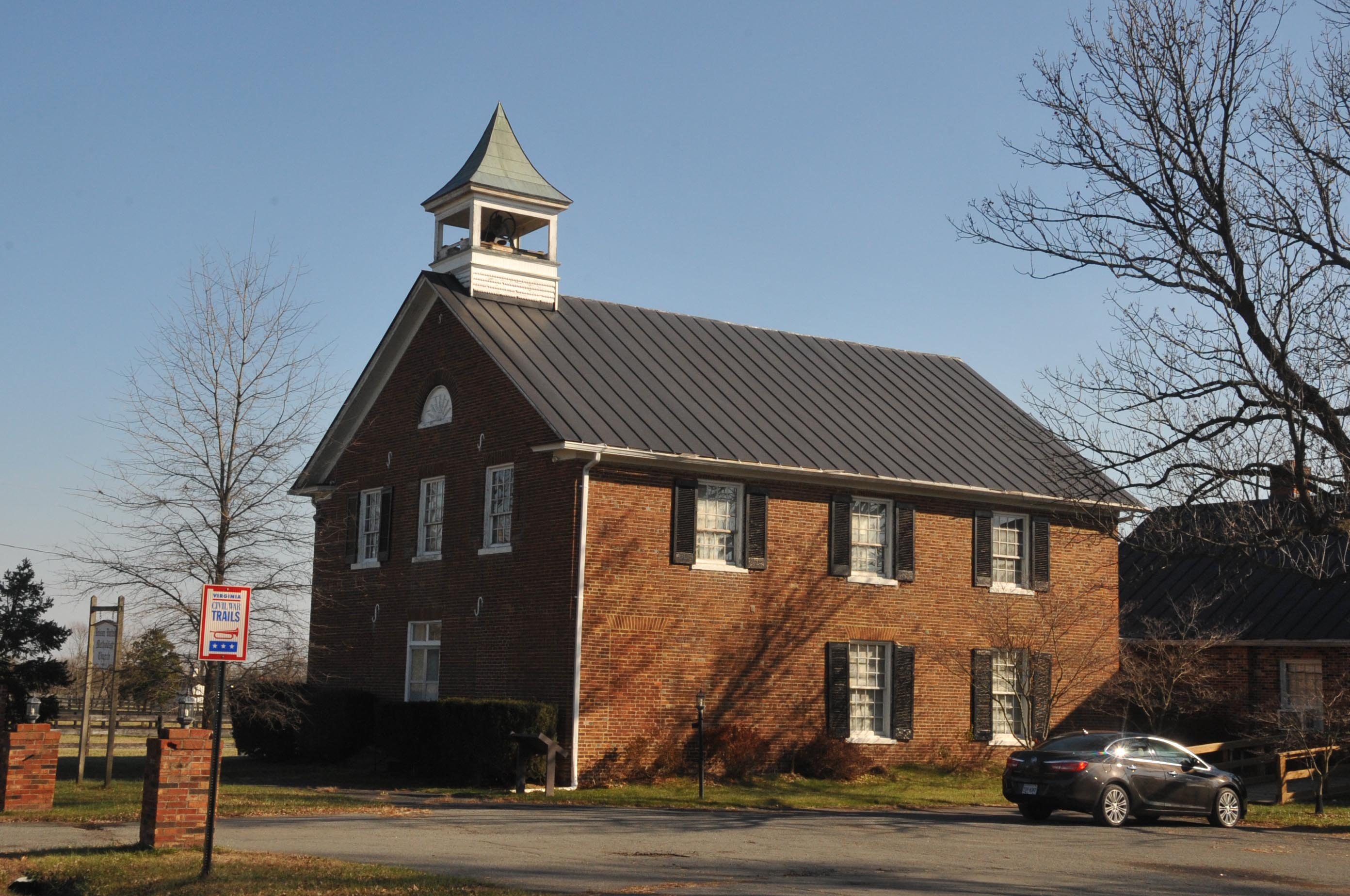
- Unison United Methodist Church

- Location within Northern Virginia Location within Virginia Location within the United States
- Location: Area including parts of Unison and Bloomfield Rds., at Unison, near Middleburg, Virginia
- Coordinates: 39°2′8″N 77°47′31″W
- Area: 70 acres (28 ha)
- Built: 1802
- Architectural style: Federal, Greek Revival, et al.
- NRHP reference No.: 03000442
- VLR No.: 053-0692

Significant dates
- Added to NRHP: May 22, 2003
- Designated VLR: December 4, 2002

Unison Historic District is a national historic district located at Unison, near Middleburg, Loudoun County, Virginia. It encompasses 41 contributing buildings and 3 contributing structures in the village of Unison. It is primarily residential, but also includes a church, former school, store, and saddle-maker's shop. The oldest buildings are "Butterland" and "Elton." Other notable buildings include the Thornton Walker House, Mary Phillips House, Henry Evans House, Glatton Folly (c. 1820), and Unison United Methodist Church.

It was listed on the National Register of Historic Places in 2003. and expanded to 62 contributing buildings in 2011 as the Unison Battlefield Historic District.
