= Middleburg, Virginia =

- Town
- Town of Middleburg
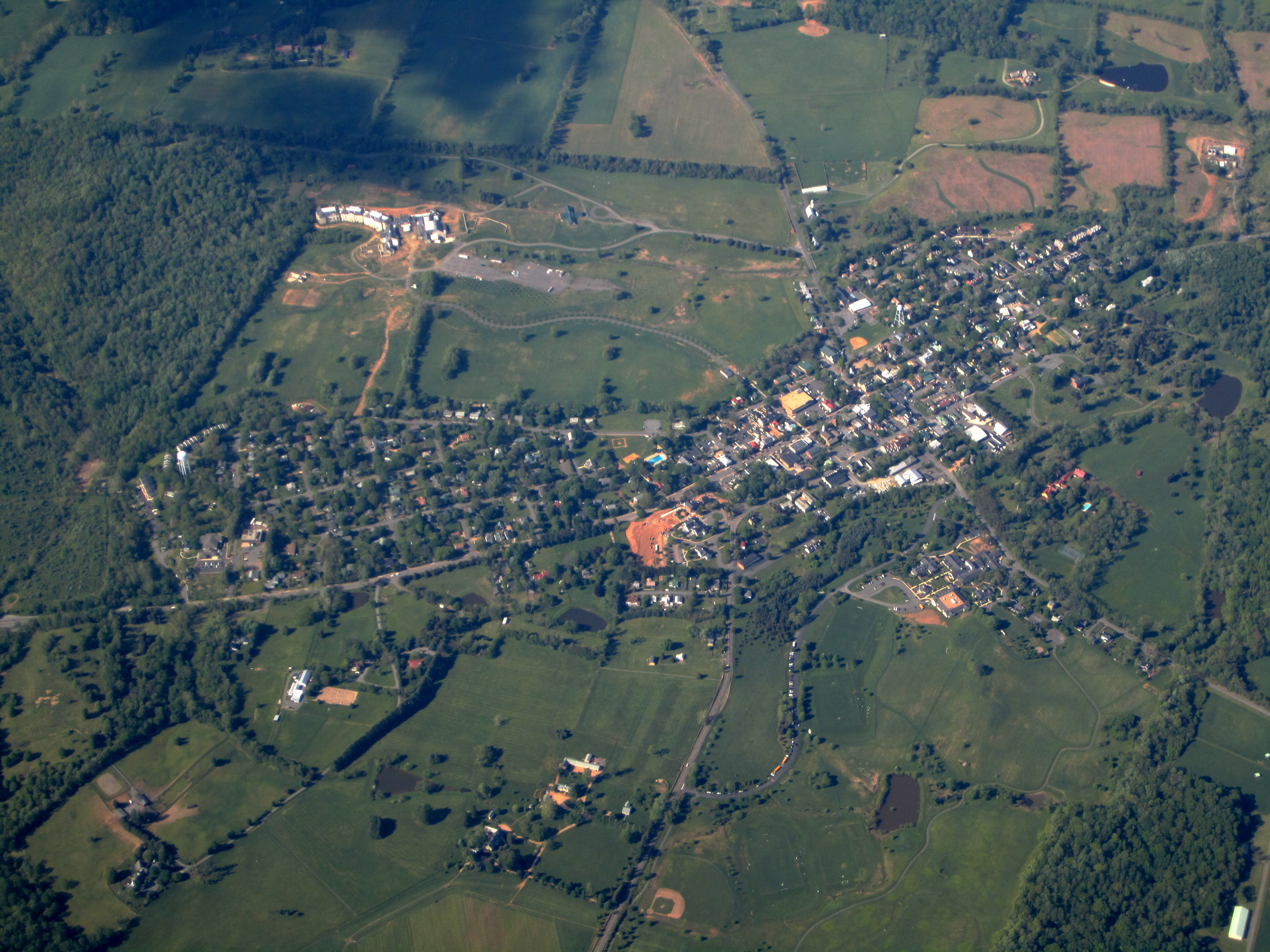
- Aerial view of Middleburg
- Motto(s): "Semel et Semper" ("Once and Always")
- Location within Northern Virginia Location within Virginia Location within the United States
- Coordinates: 38°58′6″N 77°44′15″W
- Country: United States
- State: Virginia
- County: Loudoun
- Founded: 1787

Government
  - Mayor: Bridge Littleton

Area
  - Total: 1.04 sq mi (2.70 km^{2})
  - Land: 1.04 sq mi (2.69 km^{2})
  - Water: 0.0039 sq mi (0.01 km^{2})
- Elevation: 486 ft (148 m)

Population (2020)
  - Total: 669
  - Estimate (2019): 834
  - Density: 804.2/sq mi (310.49/km^{2})
- Time zone: UTC−5 (Eastern Time Zone (ET))
  - Summer (DST): UTC−4 (EDT)
- ZIP codes: 20117–20118
- Area code: 540
- FIPS code: 51-51448
- GNIS feature ID: 1470422
- Website: middleburgva.gov

Middleburg is a town in Loudoun County, Virginia, United States. As of the 2020 census, Middleburg had a population of 669. It is the southernmost town along Loudoun County's shared border with Fauquier County.

Middleburg is known as the "Nation's Horse and Hunt Capital" for its foxhunting, steeplechases, and large estates. The Middleburg Historic District, comprising the 19th-century center of town, is listed on the National Register of Historic Places.

== History ==
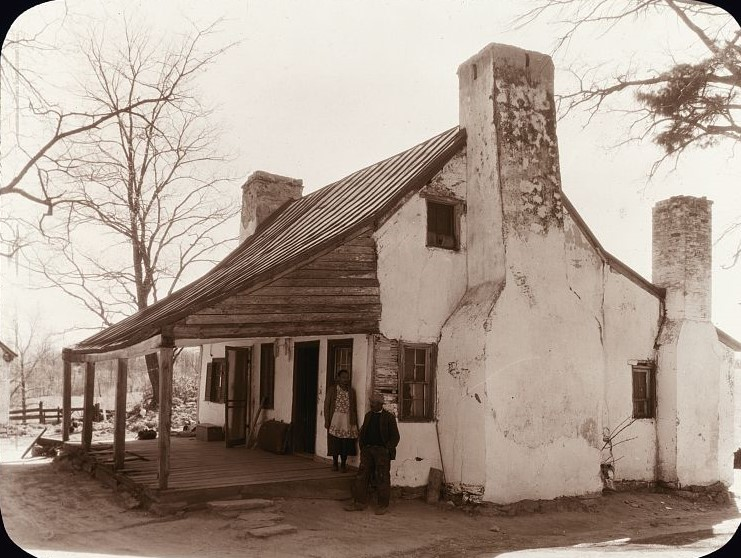
Cabin near Middleburg, Loudon, by Frances Benjamin Johnston, ca. 1930s. Photo shows African American man and woman, outdoors, standing at the corner of a house near the chimney

The town was established in 1787 by Revolutionary War officer and statesman Leven Powell. He purchased the land for Middleburg at $2.50 per acre in 1763 from Joseph Chinn, a first cousin of George Washington. It had been called "Chinn's Crossroads" and was then called Powell Town. When Leven Powell declined to have the town named after him, the town was called Middleburgh, and later, simply Middleburg. The village is located midway between the port of Alexandria and Winchester, Virginia, on the Ashby Gap trading route (now followed by U.S. Route 50).

In 1863, Middleburg witnessed two skirmishes during the Gettysburg campaign of the Civil War.

From the early 1900s, Middleburg began welcoming visitors who participated in foxhunting and steeplechasing. The village soon earned a reputation as the "Nation's Horse and Hunt Capital", attracting prominent visitors from across the U.S. Middleburg is the home of the 15,000-square-foot (1,400 m^{2}) National Sporting Library research center for horse and field sports, which publishes Thoroughbred Heritage on the Internet. A new addition is being made to include an art gallery and museum.

In 1961, activists of the Civil Rights Movement pressed John F. Kennedy on local segregation issues during his residency outside town. That year, he and Jackie had rented Glen Ora.

The Middleburg Historic District, comprising the 19th-century center of town, is listed on the National Register of Historic Places. The oldest building in town, the Red Fox Inn & Tavern, was originally established in 1728 by Joseph Chinn as Chinn's Ordinary and is billed as the oldest continually operated inn in the U.S. The oldest known house still in use as a residence, "Middleburg House," was built in 1779. Also listed on the National Register of Historic Places are Benton, the Burrland Farm Historic District, Green Pastures, Huntland, Mill House, Gen. William Mitchell House, Much Haddam, Unison Historic District, and Welbourne.

== Geography ==
According to the United States Census Bureau, the town has a total area of 0.6 square mile (1.5 km^{2}), all land. The elevation is 486 feet.

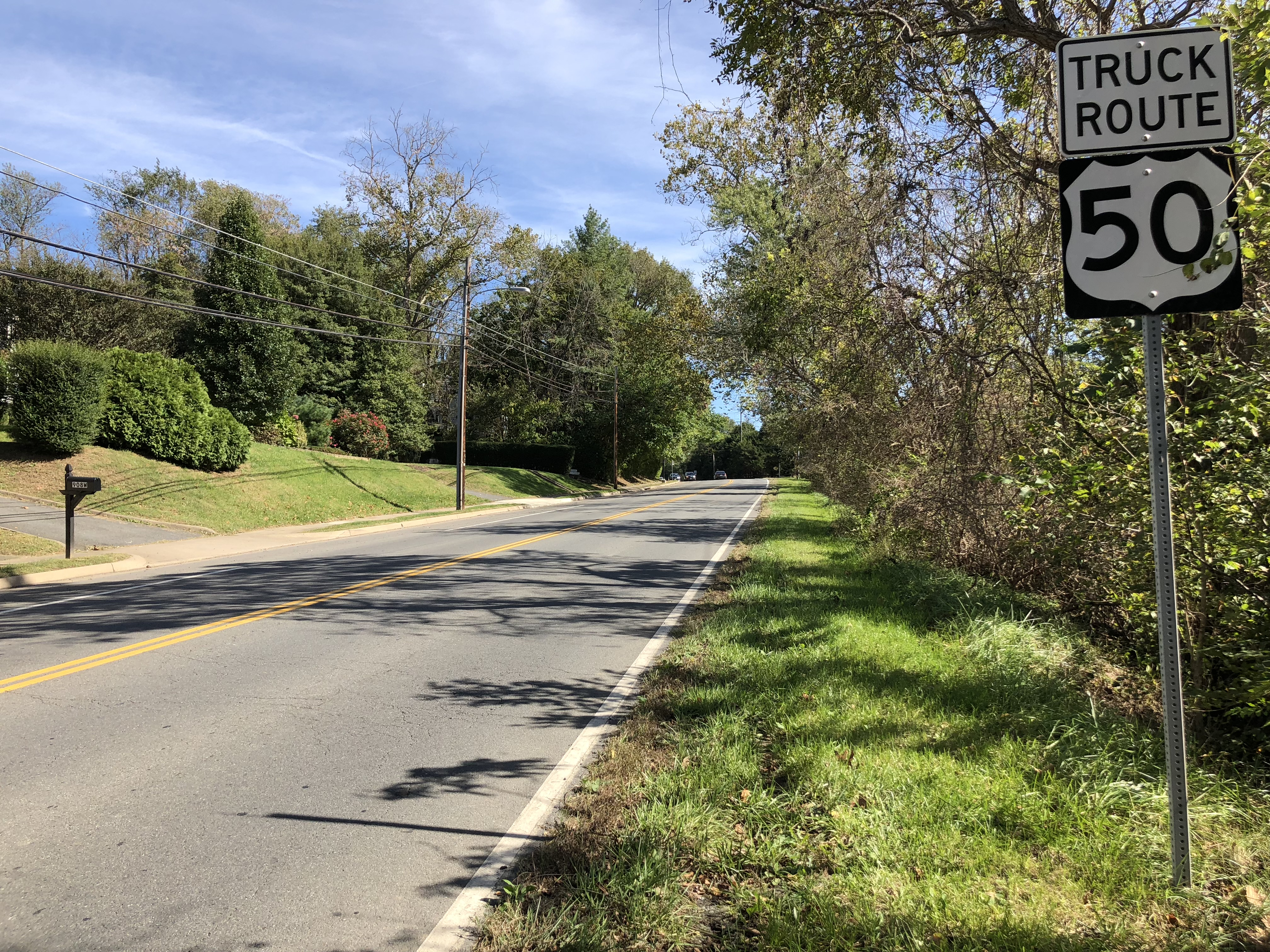
US 50 in Middleburg

== Transportation ==
U.S. Route 50 is the only primary highway directly serving Middleburg. US 50 continues westward from Middleburg to Winchester. Heading east, US 50 reaches Fairfax, continues on through Washington, D.C., and eventually ends in Ocean City, Maryland.

== Demographics ==
Historical population
| Census | Pop. | Note | %± |
|---|---|---|---|
| 1880 | 419 | | — |
| 1890 | 429 | | 2.4% |
| 1900 | 296 | | −31.0% |
| 1910 | 263 | | −11.1% |
| 1920 | 283 | | 7.6% |
| 1930 | 298 | | 5.3% |
| 1940 | 629 | | 111.1% |
| 1950 | 663 | | 5.4% |
| 1960 | 761 | | 14.8% |
| 1970 | 833 | | 9.5% |
| 1980 | 619 | | −25.7% |
| 1990 | 549 | | −11.3% |
| 2000 | 632 | | 15.1% |
| 2010 | 673 | | 6.5% |
| 2020 | 669 | | −0.6% |
U.S. Decennial Census

As of the census of 2000, there were 632 people, 322 households, and 171 families residing in the town. The population density was 1,083.8 people per square mile (420.7/km^{2}). There were 364 housing units at an average density of 624.2 per square mile (242.3/km^{2}). The racial makeup of the town was 76.58% White, 20.25% African American, 0.16% Asian, 1.27% from other races, and 1.74% from two or more races. Hispanic or Latino of any race were 4.27% of the population.

There were 322 households, out of which 20.2% had children under the age of 18 living with them, 33.2% were married couples living together, 14.9% had a female householder with no husband present, and 46.6% were non-families. 39.4% of all households were made up of individuals, and 15.8% had someone living alone who was 65 years of age or older. The average household size was 1.96 and the average family size was 2.57.

In the town, the population was spread out, with 16.9% under the age of 18, 5.9% from 18 to 24, 29.4% from 25 to 44, 26.1% from 45 to 64, and 21.7% who were 65 years of age or older. The median age was 44 years. For every 100 females, there were 72.7 males. For every 100 females aged 18 and over, there were 71.6 males.

The median income for a household in the town was $40,625, and the median income for a family was $60,313. Males had a median income of $41,875 versus $32,708 for females. The per capita income for the town was $32,643. About 6.7% of families and 9.9% of the population were below the poverty line, including 10.7% of those under age 18 and 10.3% of those age 65 or over.

== Public safety ==
Middleburg is served by the Middleburg Police Department, composed of eight sworn officers and a civilian employee. It is also served by the Loudoun County Sheriff's Office. The Middleburg Volunteer Fire Department was founded in 1936, the third oldest fire department in Loudoun County. After facing numerous challenges in its final years, the fire department dissolved and turned over its operations to Loudoun County Fire-Rescue in 2015. The current Middleburg station 3 is staffed 24 hours a day, 7 days a week by career personnel from the county.

== Notable people ==
- Charles T. Akre, investor, financier and businessman
- Mo Alie-Cox (born 1993), American football tight end
- Bill Backer (1926–2016), advertising executive and thoroughbred owner
- Stewart W. Bainum Sr. (1919–2014), American businessman and philanthropist
- Melanie Blunt, former First Lady of Missouri (2005–2009)
- Marshall Brement, U.S. Ambassador to Iceland (1981–1985), lived in Middleburg before moving to Tucson, Arizona
- Jack Kent Cooke (1912–1997), businessman and former owner of the Washington Redskins and the Los Angeles Lakers
- John L. Dagg (1794–1884), Baptist clergy and author, president of Mercer University from 1844 to 1854
- Robert Duvall (1931–2026), award-winning American actor and director
- Edwin Broun Fred (1887–1981), educator
- Sam Huff (1934–2021), retired Hall-of-Fame American football player for the Washington Redskins and New York Giants
- Rodney Jenkins (1944–2024), show jumper
- Sheila Johnson (born 1949), billionaire co-founder of BET and local real estate developer
- John F. Kennedy (1917–1963), 35th President of the United States (1961–1963), built Wexford just outside Middleburg with his wife, Jacqueline (1929–1994)
- William John Logan (1891–1977): Banker, college football player, and the 2nd Mayor of Flower Hill, New York, serving in that capacity between 1931 and 1937.
- George C. McGhee (1912–2005), diplomat and businessman
- Paul Mellon (1907–1999), philanthropist and race-horse breeder and owner
- Alice du Pont Mills (1912–2002), aviator, race-horse breeder and owner, environmentalist, philanthropist, and member of the Du Pont family
- Lucy Minnigerode (1871–1935), superintendent, United States Public Health Service Nursing Corps
- Wendy Pepper (1964–2017), fashion designer
- Keshia Knight Pulliam (born 1979), actress best known for her role on The Cosby Show as Rudy Huxtable
- Colin Shutler (born 1998), soccer player
- Bruce Sundlun (1920–2011), businessman, lawyer, and former Governor of Rhode Island (1991–1995)
- Elizabeth Taylor (1932–2011), actress and activist, owned a farm with her then husband, Republican senator and former U.S. Secretary of the Navy John Warner (1927–2021)
- Frederick M. Warburg (1897–1973), investment banker, owned a horse and cattle farm
- Stephanie Zimbalist (born 1956), actress best known for her role as Laura Holt on Remington Steele

== Newspapers ==
- Middleburg Eccentric: Middleburg's only locally owned and operated newspaper.
- Middleburg Life: Monthly lifestyle publication/news service. Middleburg's oldest and most respected locally owned and operated newspaper covering the people, lifestyles, and trends of the countryside.
- Purcellville Gazette: Weekly newspaper, based in Purcellville, Virginia, serving Middleburg and western Loudoun County.

== In popular culture ==
- In the Emile Ardolino's film Chances Are (1989), the wedding of Louis Jeffries III to Cybill Sheperd, happens to take place on Saturday the 18th of May 1963, in the All Saints Church, located in Maiden Lane, Middleburg, Virginia, although this precise church doesn't exist.
- Middleburg was named as the location of the mysterious crop circles in the horror film spoof Scary Movie 3 (2003). The film shows an actual map of the Middleburg area, complete with actual surrounding towns and Route 15 pictured on the map.
- The New Hampshire scenes in the season three "Manchester" episodes of The West Wing were filmed in Middleburg.
- The Red Fox Inn is featured in Alfred Hitchcock's Marnie (1964) and the town's name as well as surrounding towns are mentioned over the loudspeaker in the bus station. Several horse riding scenes were also shot there.
