= Red Fox Inn (Horton Bay, Michigan) =

- Horton Bay House--Red Fox Inn
- U.S. National Register of Historic Places
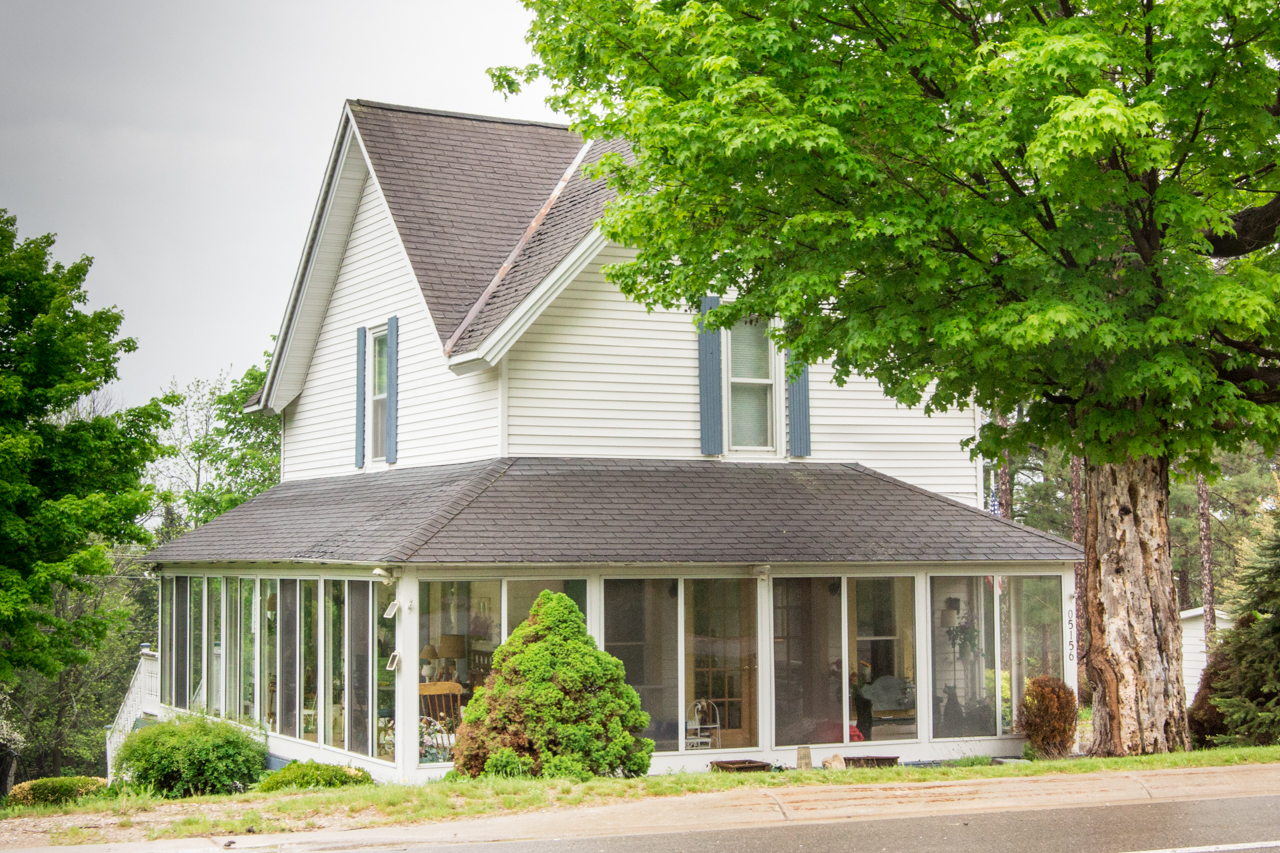

- Location within Michigan Location within the United States
- Interactive map
- Location: 05156 Boyne City Rd., Bay Township, Horton Bay, Michigan
- Coordinates: 45°17′6″N 85°4′45″W
- Area: 1 acre (0.40 ha)
- Built: 1876
- Built by: William H. Ohle
- Architectural style: Late Victorian Vernacular
- NRHP reference No.: 95000372
- Added to NRHP: April 7, 1995

The Red Fox Inn, also known as the Horton Bay House, is a building, originally, a boardinghouse, located at 05156 Boyne City Road in Horton Bay, Michigan. It was listed in the National Register of Historic Places in 1995. The inn is mentioned in Ernest Hemingway's short story, "Up in Michigan," and tradition has it that the inn's proprietor during the 1910s and 20s, Vollie Fox, taught Hemingway how to fish.

== History ==
In 1870, Horton Bay's founder Samuel Horton established a homestead at this site. In 1876, Alonzo J. Stroud and William H. Ohle set up a sawmill near here and were soon employing up to 30 workers. With the influx of workers, Horton Bay quickly grew into a small community, and the need for a general store and other services soon became apparent. William H. Ohle withdrew from the sawmill business and concentrated on real estate and construction in the new community. Ohle supervised the construction of many early buildings in the community These included the Horton Bay General Store, as well as the next-door boardinghouse (now the Red Fox Inn) in about 1878.

The boardinghouse soon acquired the name "Horton Bay House," and it served as a boardinghouse for millworkers, and as a hotel for transients. The boardinghouse function lasted until the mill closed in 1890. Although the Horton Bay House still operated as a hotel, the transient population was declining, and much of the space was rented to local families on a long-term basis. During this time, the house was owned by James Dilworth, who had been a blacksmith at the sawmill. In 1910, Dilworth sold the building to James Wixham Fox, the local highway commissioner, and his wife Mary. James Fox died in 1914, and in 1915 Mary signed over the property to her son Vollie Fox.

In 1919, Vollie Fox and his wife Lizzie Spura Fox established a restaurant in the building, the Red Fox Inn. As the automobile became more pervasive, this area of northwestern lower Michigan was becoming a popular summer tourist destination, and the Red Fox Inn catered to the burgeoning tourist trade. Vollie Fox died in 1947 and Lizzie Spura Fox, became the sole owner. In 1955, Lizzie Fox sold the Red Fox Inn to her daughter, Marian Ruth Fox Hartwell. Hartwell owned the Inn until 1984, when she sold it to her son, James Vol Hartwell. The restaurant in the building remained in operation until the 1970s. After that time, the Red Fox Inn served as a bed-and-breakfast, operating during the summer months.

The Red Fox Inn also served as a local products store, including Ernest Hemingway memorabilia. James Vol Hartwell died in 2015, and the building and store passed to his children, Ernest and Prudence Hartwell.

== Description ==
The Red Fox Inn is a two-story, side-gable, white-painted building constructed in a later 19th century vernacular style. It is clad with clapboard with narrow cornerboards, and has projecting eaves with plain raking cornices. A screened-in porch runs the width of the front.

The interior has three large dining rooms on the first floor, as well as a series of kitchen rooms added in stages from about 1919 to 1935. The second story contains four guest rooms, a parlor, and a bathroom. The third floor is a long, unfinished stand-up attic. The entire house has the original woodwork, as well as the original paneled doors, knobs and hinges.
