= Unisonic =

Unisonic may refer to:

- Unisonic (band), German hard rock band fronted by Michael Kiske
- Unisonic (album), eponymous 2012 album by hard rock band Unisonic
- Unisonic Products Corporation, American manufacturing company
