= Horton Bay, Michigan =

- Census-designated place (CDP) & unincorporated community
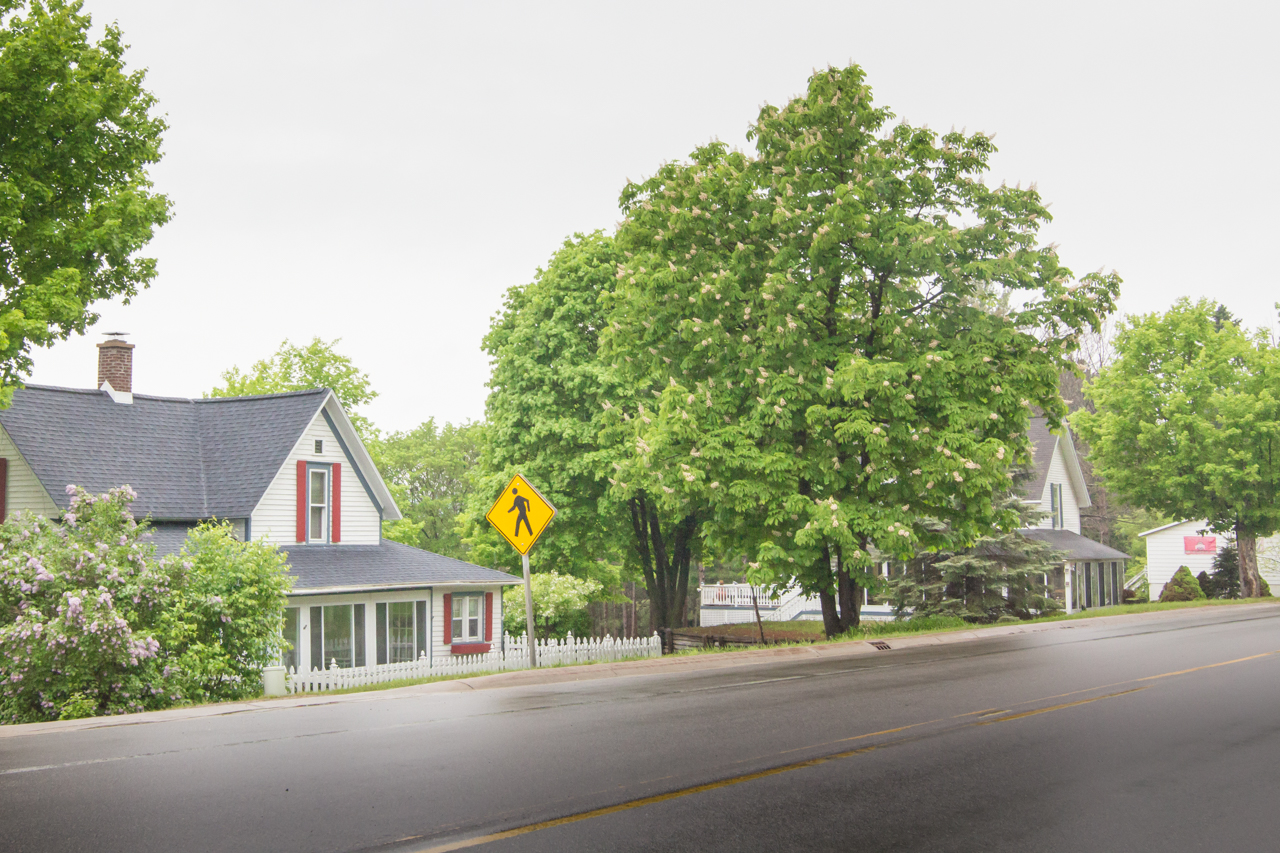
- Horton Bay Historical District

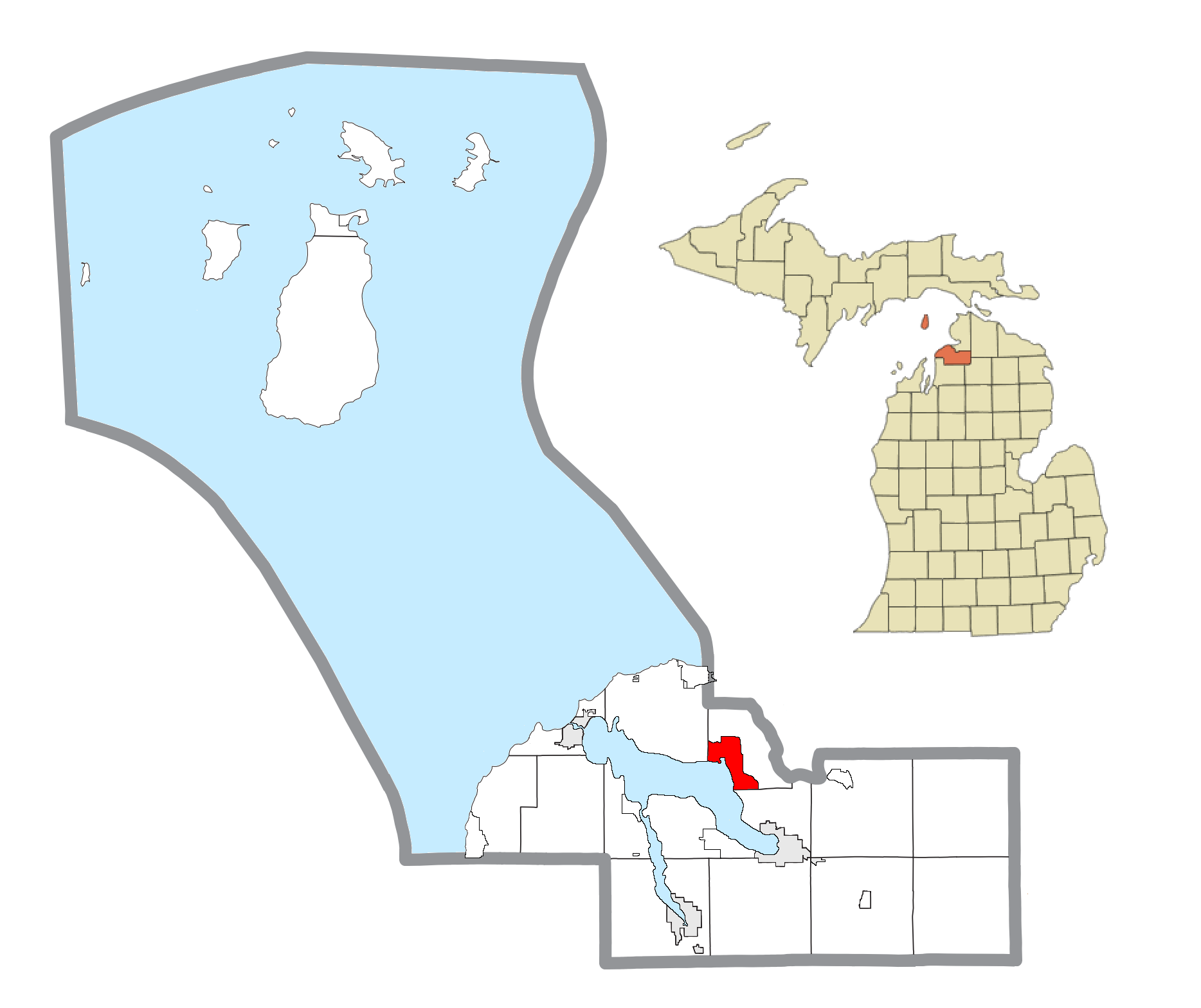
- Location within Charlevoix County

- Location within the state of Michigan Location within the United States
- Coordinates: 45°17′04″N 85°04′45″W
- Country: United States
- State: Michigan
- County: Charlevoix
- Township: Bay
- Settled: 1876

Area
  - Total: 6.17 sq mi (15.98 km^{2})
  - Land: 4.82 sq mi (12.48 km^{2})
  - Water: 1.35 sq mi (3.50 km^{2})
- Elevation: 673 ft (205 m)

Population (2020)
  - Total: 485
  - Density: 100.6/sq mi (38.85/km^{2})
- Time zone: UTC-5 (Eastern (EST))
  - Summer (DST): UTC-4 (EDT)
- ZIP code(s): 49712 (Boyne City); 49720 (Charlevoix)
- Area code: 231
- FIPS code: 26-39340
- GNIS feature ID: 1618908

Horton Bay is an unincorporated community and census-designated place (CDP) in Charlevoix County in the U.S. state of Michigan. The population of the CDP was 485 at the 2020 census. The community is located within Bay Township on northeastern shores of Lake Charlevoix.

== History ==
The area was settled as early as 1876 by pioneer settled Samuel Horton in 1876 as a lumbering community. Located along Pine Lake (now known as Lake Charlevoix), the community was originally spelled as Horton's Bay when a post office opened on February 27, 1879 with Alonzo Stroud serving as the first postmaster. The name was shortened to Horton Bay on October 12, 1894. The post office operated until January 15, 1910.

Ernest Hemingway frequently visited Horton Bay to camp and fish, and the area is the setting for several of his famous The Nick Adams Stories. Hemingway was married here in 1921.

Horton Bay was designated as a Michigan State Historic Site on November 12, 1975. The district includes several properties that are also listed on the National Register of Historic Places: Horton Bay General Store, Horton Bay School, and Red Fox Inn (Horton Bay House).

The community of Horton Bay was listed as a newly-organized census-designated place for the 2010 census, meaning it now has officially defined boundaries and population statistics for the first time.

== Geography ==
According to the U.S. Census Bureau, the Horton Bay CDP has a total area of 6.17 square miles (15.98 km^{2}), of which 4.82 square miles (12.48 km^{2}) is land and 1.35 square miles (3.50 km^{2}) (21.88%) is water.

Horton Bay is located along the northeastern coastline of Lake Charlevoix.

=== Major highways ===
- C-56 (Boyne City–Charlevoix Road) is a county-designated highway that runs through the community near the shores of Lake Charlevoix.
- C-71 (Horton Bay Road) is a county-designated highway that runs south into the community and ends at C-56.

== Demographics ==
According to the 2024 United States Census Bureau, the population of Horton Bay, Michigan is 374 people. 142 men and 232 females. The majority of the population is white.

Historical population
Census	Pop.	Note	%±
2010	512		—
2020	485		−5.3%
U.S. Decennial Census

== Education ==
Horton Bay is served entirely by Boyne City Public Schools to the southeast in Boyne City.

== Images ==
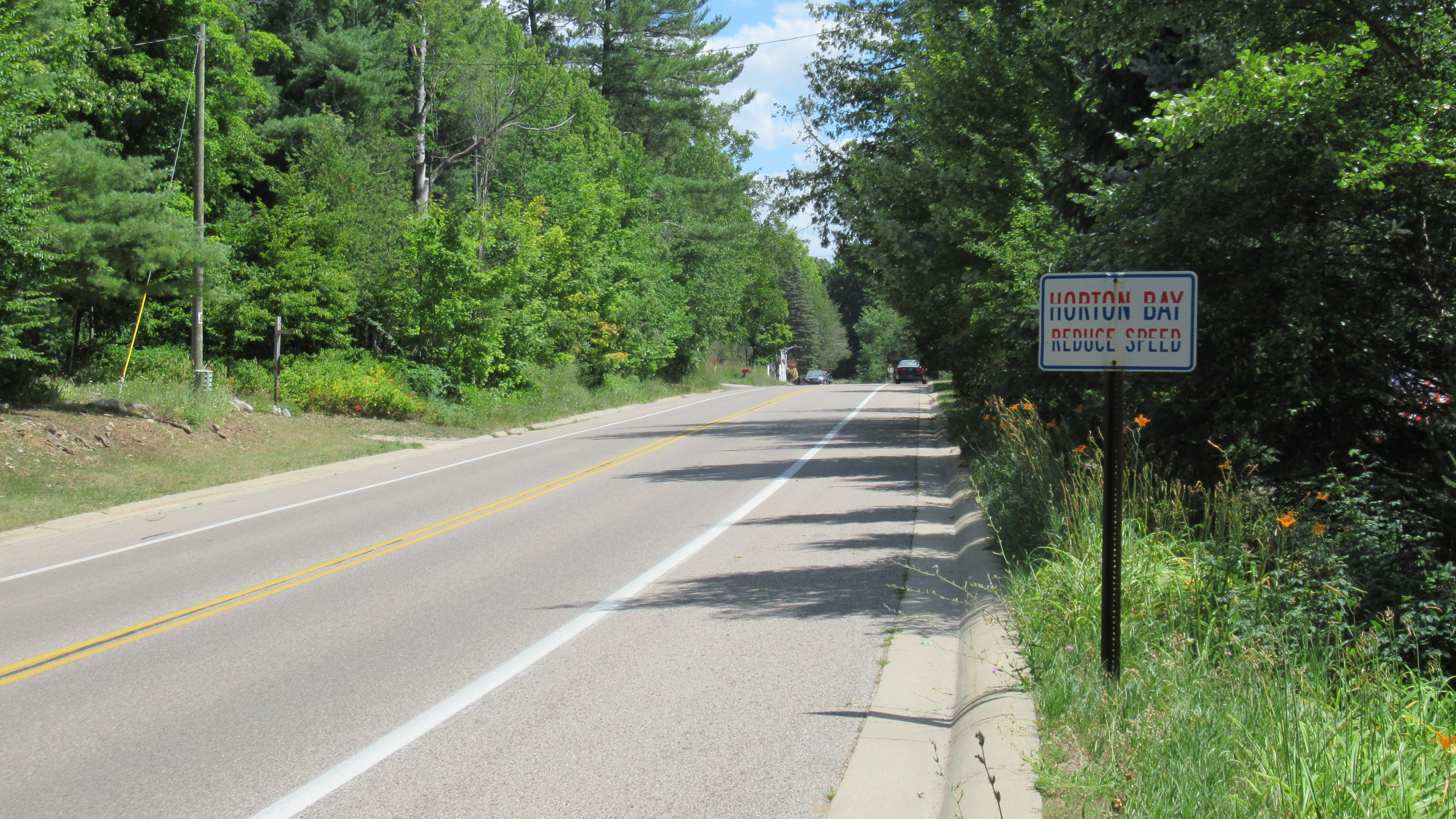
Road signage along Boyne City Road

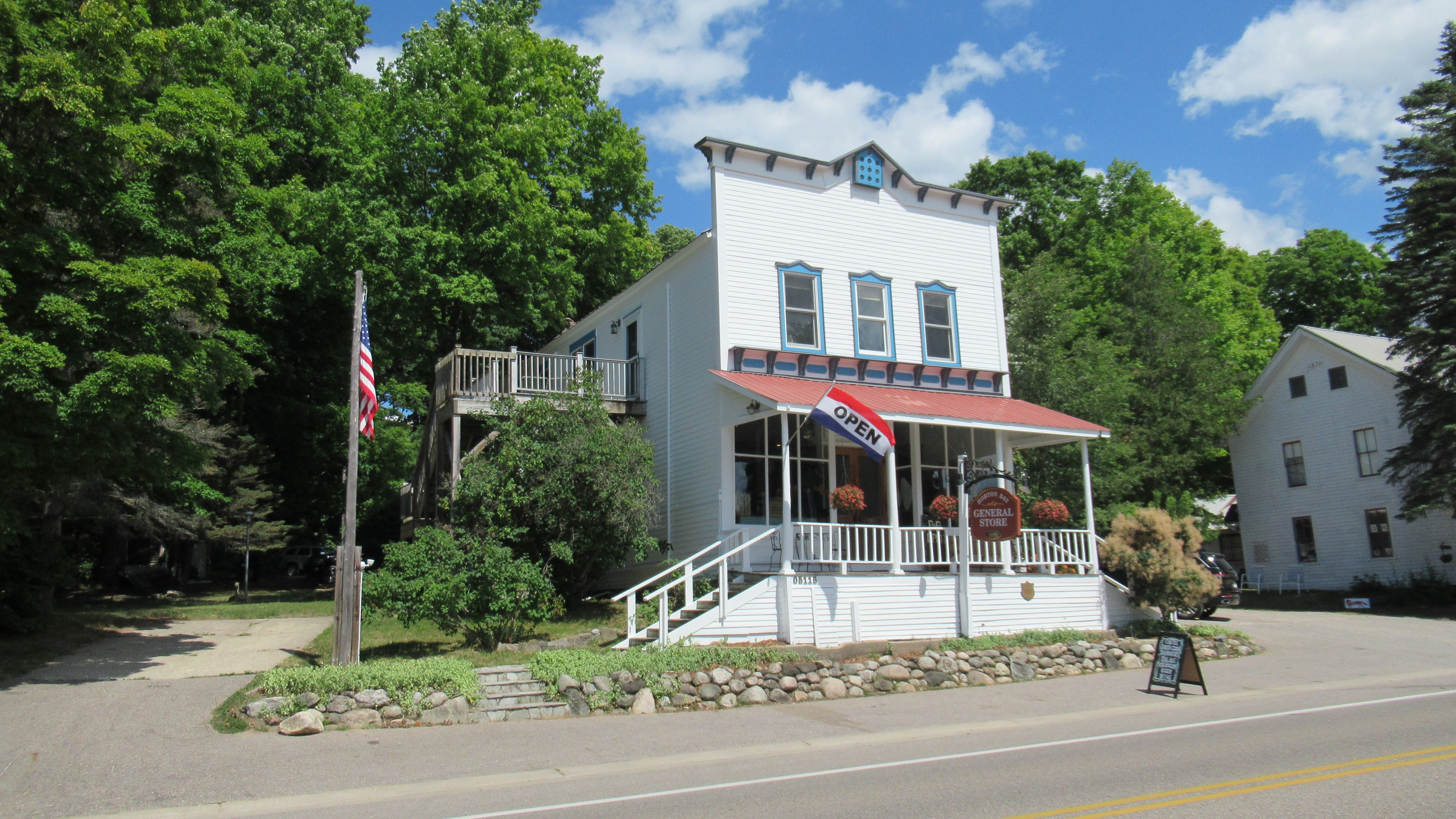
Horton Bay General Store

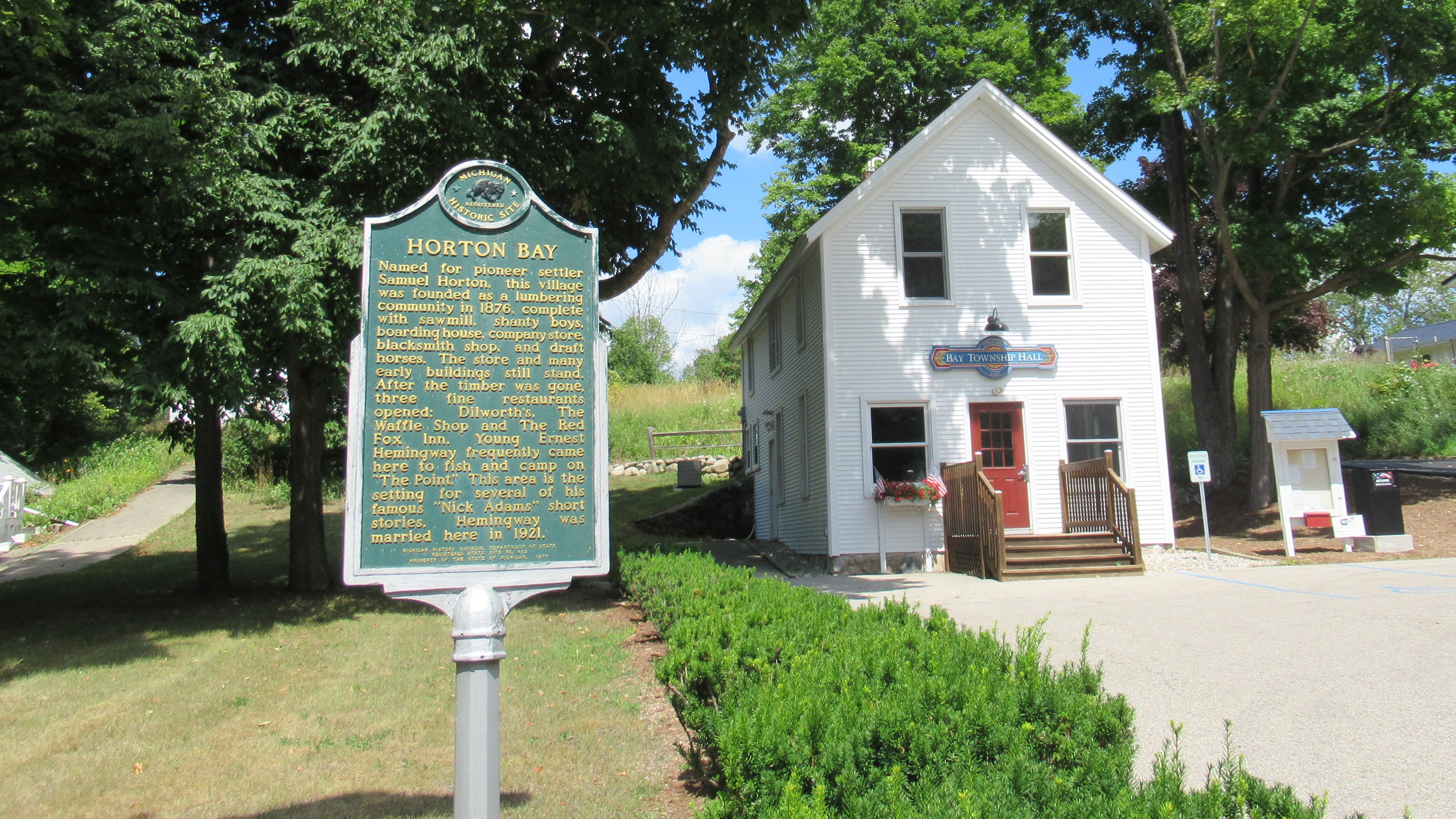
State historic marker
