= Red Fox Inn & Tavern =

- The Red Fox Inn & Tavern
- U.S. National Register of Historic Places
- Virginia Landmarks Register
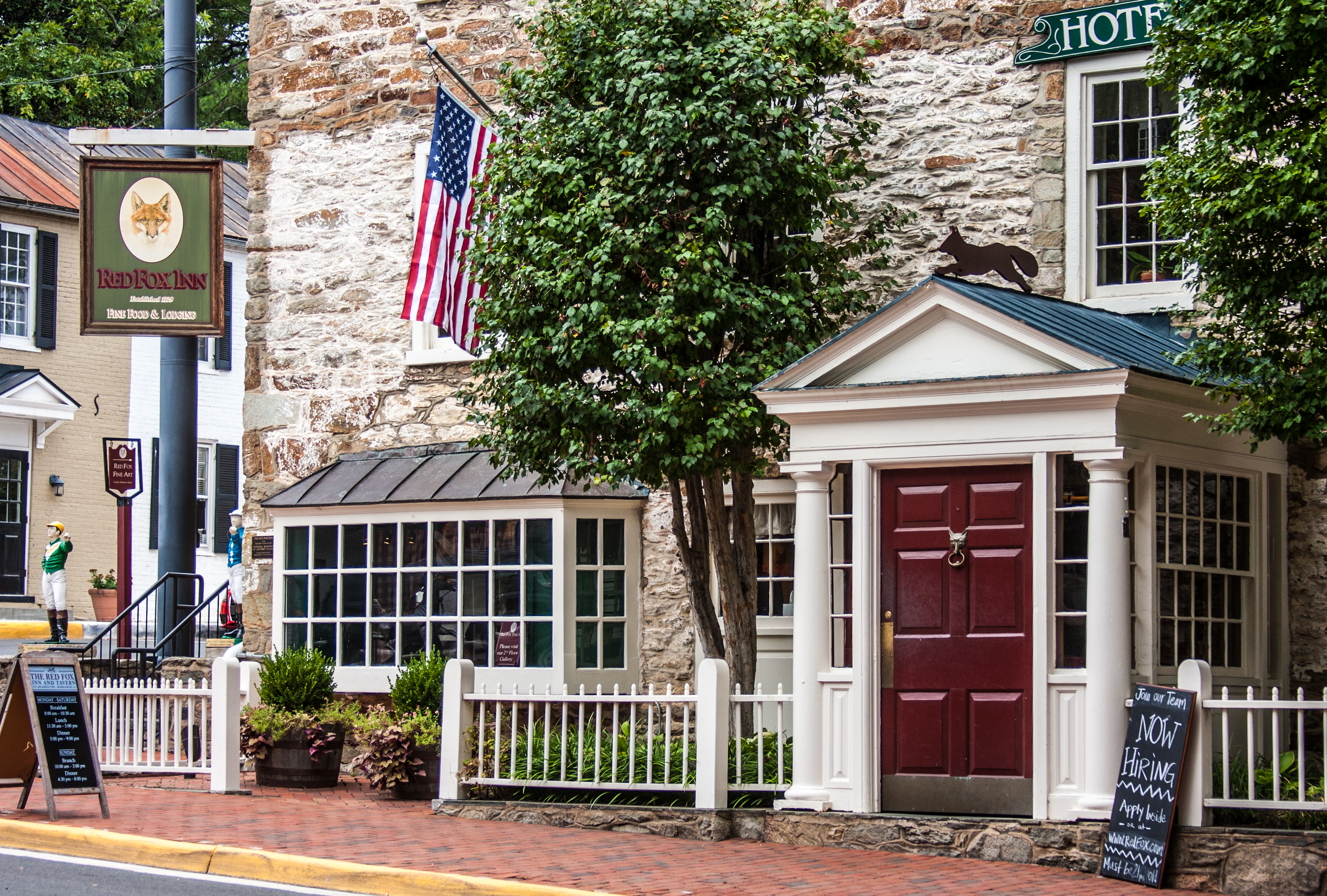
- The Red Fox Inn & Tavern, August 2012

- Location within Northern Virginia Location within Virginia Location within the United States
- Location: 2 E. Washington St., Middleburg, Virginia
- Coordinates: 38°58′4″N 77°43′48″W
- Area: 0.5 acres (0.20 ha)
- Built: c. 1728, 1850s, 1890s, 1940s
- Architect: Dew, William B.
- Architectural style: Federal, Colonial Revival
- NRHP reference No.: 97001403
- VLR No.: 259-0162-0055

Significant dates
- Added to NRHP: November 13, 1997
- Designated VLR: March 19, 1997

The Red Fox Inn & Tavern, also known as the Middleburg Inn and Beveridge House, is a historic inn and tavern located in Middleburg, Loudoun County, Virginia. According to the National Register of Historic Places placard on the building, the Red Fox Inn was established circa 1728. Some historic artifacts on the building date to about 1830, with additions and remodelings dating from the 1850s, 1890s, and the 1940s. It consists of a 2 1/2 story-with-basement, five-bay, gable-roofed, fieldstone main block, with a two-story, three-bay, gable-roofed fieldstone rear wing. The front facade features a one-story, one-bay, pedimented porch dating from the 1940s. It has a standing seam metal gable roof and exterior end chimneys. The buildings exhibits design details in the Federal and Colonial Revival styles. It is thought to be one of the oldest continuously operated inns in Virginia as well as the United States. The Red Fox Inn & Tavern has served a variety of functions including: stagecoach stop, inn, tavern, butcher shop, apartment house, post office, and hotel.

It was listed on the National Register of Historic Places in 1997.
