= List of islands of Michigan =

Islands of the state of Michigan
- Location of Michigan within the United States

Geography
- Location: Michigan
- Major islands: Beaver, Drummond, Grosse Ile, Harsens, Isle Royale, Mackinac

Administration
- United States
- State: Michigan

The following is a list of islands of Michigan. Michigan has the second longest coastline of any state after Alaska. Being bordered by four of the five Great Lakes—Erie, Huron, Michigan, and Superior—Michigan also has 64,980 inland lakes and ponds, as well as innumerable rivers, that may contain their own islands included in this list. The majority of the islands are within the Great Lakes. Other islands can also be found within other waterways of the Great Lake system, including Lake St. Clair, St. Clair River, Detroit River, and St. Marys River.

The largest of all the islands is Isle Royale in Lake Superior, which, in addition to its waters and other surrounding islands, is organized as Isle Royale National Park. Isle Royale itself is 206 square miles (530 km^{2}). The most populated island is Grosse Ile with approximately 10,000 residents, located in the Detroit River about 10 miles (16 kilometres) south of Detroit. The majority of Michigan's islands are uninhabited and very small. Some of these otherwise unusable islands have been used for the large number of Michigan's lighthouses to aid in shipping throughout the Great Lakes, while others have been set aside as nature reserves. Many islands in Michigan have the same name, even some that are in the same municipality and body of water, such as Gull, Long, or Round islands.

== Lake Erie ==
Lake Erie

Only Monroe County and a very small portion of Wayne County have boundaries within the westernmost portion of Lake Erie. The lake has a mean surface elevation of 571 feet (174 m). The islands in the southern portion of the county are part of the North Maumee Bay Archeological District of the Detroit River International Wildlife Refuge, while northern islands are part of Pointe Mouillee State Game Area at the mouth of the Huron River and Detroit River. Turtle Island is the only island in the state of Michigan that is shared by another state, as it is divided with the state of Ohio.

| Island | Municipality | County | Coordinates | Ref |
|---|---|---|---|---|
| Dalhka Island | Brownstown Township | Wayne | 42°02′15.6″N 83°11′32.1″W | |
| Gard Island | Erie Township | Monroe | 41°44′55.3″N 83°26′33.7″W | |
| Indian Island | Erie Township | Monroe | 41°44′53.4″N 83°27′14.3″W | |
| Rat Island | Brownstown Township | Wayne | 42°02′04.2″N 83°11′24.4″W | |
| Smiths Island | Monroe Township | Monroe | 41°52′21.0″N 83°21′40.0″W | |
| Turtle Island | Erie Township | Monroe | 41°45′09.0″N 83°23′28.9″W | |
| Waterman Island | Berlin Township | Monroe | 42°02′02.7″N 83°11′54.7″W | |

== Lake Huron ==
Lake Huron

Lake Huron is the second largest of the Great Lakes (after Lake Superior) with a surface area of 23,010 square miles (59,600 km^{2}). Michigan is the only state to border Lake Huron, while the portion of the lake on the other side of the international border belongs to the province of Ontario. The vast majority of Michigan's islands in Lake Huron are centered around Drummond Island in the northernmost portion of the state's lake territory. Another large group of islands is the Les Cheneaux Islands archipelago, which itself contains dozens of small islands. Many of the lake's islands are very small and uninhabited.

As the most popular tourist destination in the state, Mackinac Island is the most well known of Lake Huron's islands. Drummond Island is the state's second-largest island (after Isle Royale) and is the most populous of Michigan's islands in Lake Huron, with a population of 1,058 at the 2010 census. While Mackinac Island had a population of 492, there are thousands more seasonal workers and tourists during the summer months.

== Lake Michigan ==
Lake Michigan

Michigan only has islands in Lake Michigan in the northern portion of the lake. There are no islands in the southern half of Lake Michigan. The largest and most populated of Michigan's islands in Lake Michigan is Beaver Island at 55.8 square miles (145 km^{2}) and 551 residents. Some of the smaller islands surrounding Beaver Island are part of the larger Michigan Islands National Wildlife Refuge.

| Island | Municipality | County | Coordinates | Ref |
|---|---|---|---|---|
| Bassett Island | Peninsula Township | Grand Traverse | 44.87250°N 85.57056°W | |
| Beaver Island | Peaine / St. James | Charlevoix | 45.66472°N 85.55722°W | |
| Bellow Island | Leelanau Township | Leelanau | 45.10000°N 85.56750°W | |
| Butlers Island | Gladstone | Delta | 45.86111°N 87.01583°W | |
| Epoufette Island | Hendricks Township | Mackinac | 46.04417°N 85.20167°W | |
| Fisherman Island | Norwood Township | Charlevoix | 45.28722°N 85.35917°W | |
| Garden Island | St. James Township | Charlevoix | 45.80472°N 85.49444°W | |
| Grape Island | St. James Township | Charlevoix | 45.78000°N 85.42056°W | |
| Gravel Island | Hudson Township | Mackinac | 46.07750°N 85.30556°W | |
| Gravelly Island | Fairbanks Township | Delta | 45.52167°N 86.72583°W | |
| Green Island | St. Ignace | Mackinac | 45.83500°N 84.74972°W | |
| Gull Island | Fairbanks Township | Delta | 45.51000°N 86.71944°W | |
| Gull Island | St. James Township | Charlevoix | 45.70250°N 85.83861°W | |
| Hat Island | St. James Township | Charlevoix | 45.81583°N 85.30000°W | |
| High Island | St. James Township | Charlevoix | 45.72444°N 85.67194°W | |
| Hog Island | St. James Township | Charlevoix | 45.79250°N 85.36361°W | |
| Horseshoe Island | St. James Township | Charlevoix | 45.77361°N 85.36139°W | |
| Ile Aux Galets | Cross Village Township | Emmet | 45.67639°N 85.17306°W | |
| Little Gull Island | Fairbanks Township | Delta | 45.49889°N 86.71444°W | |
| Little Hog Island | Hudson Township | Mackinac | 46.07000°N 85.29028°W | |
| Little Island | St. James Township | Charlevoix | 45.78806°N 85.50250°W | |
| Little Summer Island | Fairbanks Township | Delta | 45.60611°N 86.69389°W | |
| Naubinway Island | Garfield Township | Mackinac | 46.07556°N 85.44528°W | |
| North Fox Island | Leelanau Township | Leelanau | 45.48000°N 85.77583°W | |
| North Manitou Island | Leland Township | Leelanau | 45.10833°N 86.02083°W | |
| Pismire Island | St. James Township | Charlevoix | 45.76833°N 85.44528°W | |
| Poverty Island | Fairbanks Township | Delta | 45.52750°N 86.66444°W | |
| Power Island | Peninsula Township | Grand Traverse | 44.86583°N 85.57556°W | |
| Rocky Island | Fairbanks Township | Delta | 45.60915°N 86.70957°W | |
| Round Island | Ford River Township | Delta | 45.64278°N 87.16806°W | |
| Round Island | Bay de Noc Township | Delta | 45.74556°N 86.76222°W | |
| Sand Island | Escanaba | Delta | 45.74056°N 87.04472°W | |
| Shoe Island | St. James Township | Charlevoix | 45.80694°N 85.29778°W | |
| Snake Island | Fairbanks Township | Delta | 45.73806°N 86.65750°W | |
| South Fox Island | Leelanau Township | Leelanau | 45.44083°N 85.87972°W | |
| South Manitou Island | Glen Arbor Township | Leelanau | 44.99917°N 86.12028°W | |
| Squaw Island | St. James Township | Charlevoix | 45.83694°N 85.58667°W | |
| Stroughbury Island | Rapid River Township | Delta | 45.54442°N 86.58266°W | |
| St. Helena Island | Moran Township | Mackinac | 45.85833°N 84.87083°W | |
| St. Martin Island | Fairbanks Township | Delta | 45.49778°N 86.77028°W | |
| St. Vital Island | Bay de Noc Township | Delta | 45.79972°N 86.75972°W | |
| Summer Island | Fairbanks Township | Delta | 45.56333°N 86.63639°W | |
| Temperance Island | Bliss Township | Emmet | 45.76306°N 85.03361°W | |
| Trout Island | St.James Township | Charlevoix | 45.77194°N 85.69036°W | |
| Waugoshance Island | Bliss Township | Emmet | 45.76389°N 85.06778°W | |
| Whiskey Island | St. James Township | Charlevoix | 45.81111°N 85.59444°W | |

== Lake Superior ==
Lake Superior

Lake Superior is the largest of the Great Lakes, and the coastline is sparsely populated. At 206 square miles (530 km^{2}), Isle Royale is the largest Michigan island and is the center of Isle Royale National Park, which itself contains over 450 islands. The following is a list of islands in Lake Superior that are not part of Isle Royale National Park. For those islands, see the list of islands in Isle Royale National Park.

| Island | Municipality | County | Coordinates | Ref |
|---|---|---|---|---|
| Au Train Island | Onota Township | Alger | 46.48528°N 86.89306°W | |
| Garlic Island | Powell Township | Marquette | 46.70444°N 87.54139°W | |
| Grand Island | Grand Island Township | Alger | 46.51667°N 86.66667°W | |
| Granite Island | Powell Township | Marquette | 46.72083°N 87.41139°W | |
| Gull Island | Powell Township | Marquette | 46.95000°N 87.95694°W | |
| Huron Islands | Powell Township | Marquette | 46.95444°N 87.97722°W | |
| Iroquois Island | Bay Mills Township | Chippewa | 46.49167°N 84.68250°W | |
| Larus Island | Marquette Township | Marquette | 46.61139°N 87.43083°W | |
| Lighthouse Island | Powell Township | Marquette | 46.96250°N 87.99944°W | |
| Little Presque Island | Marquette Township | Marquette | 46.63889°N 87.45889°W | |
| Manitou Island | Grant Township | Keweenaw | 47.41667°N 87.61667°W | |
| McIntyre Island | Powell Township | Marquette | 46.95222°N 87.97028°W | |
| Middle Island | Marquette Township | Marquette | 46.59472°N 87.40111°W | |
| Naomikong Island | Whitefish Township | Chippewa | 46.48389°N 84.95694°W | |
| Partridge Island | Marquette Township | Marquette | 46.60222°N 87.41556°W | |
| Picnic Rocks | Marquette | Marquette | 46.55583°N 87.37722°W | |
| Porters Island | Grant Township | Keweenaw | 47.47500°N 87.88306°W | |
| Presque Isle | Marquette | Marquette | 46.58806°N 87.38167°W | |
| Presque Isle Point Rocks | Marquette | Marquette | 46.59083°N 87.36361°W | |
| Ripley Rock | Marquette | Marquette | 46.53917°N 87.38750°W | |
| Tahquamenom Island | Whitefish Township | Chippewa | 46.53167°N 84.94556°W | |
| Traverse Island | Houghton Township | Houghton | 47.07167°N 88.27167°W | |
| Williams Island | Grand Island Township | Alger | 46.48194°N 86.71917°W | |
| Wood Island | Grand Island Township | Alger | 46.50944°N 86.74167°W | |

== Lake St. Clair ==
Lake St. Clair

Lake St. Clair connects Lake Huron and Lake Erie through the St. Clair River in the north and the Detroit River in the south. At 430 square miles (1,100 km^{2}), it is one of the largest non-Great Lakes in the United States, but it only contains a small number of islands near the mouth of the St. Clair River, where all of the following islands are located. The largest of these islands is Harsens Island, and all the islands are in Clay Township in St. Clair County.

| Island | Municipality | County | Coordinates | Ref |
|---|---|---|---|---|
| Bruckner Island | Clay Township | St. Clair | 42.57222°N 82.65972°W | |
| Club Island | Clay Township | St. Clair | 42.56111°N 82.67917°W | |
| Dickinson Island | Clay Township | St. Clair | 42.61028°N 82.62722°W | |
| Green Island | Clay Township | St. Clair | 42.56611°N 82.68000°W | |
| Gull Island | Clay Township | St. Clair | 42.53028°N 82.68222°W | |
| Harsens Island | Clay Township | St. Clair | 42.58944°N 82.58861°W | |
| McDonald Island | Clay Township | St. Clair | 42.58389°N 82.65444°W | |
| Middle Island | Clay Township | St. Clair | 42.61750°N 82.67639°W | |
| Muscamoot Ridge | Clay Township | St. Clair | 42.57472°N 82.63639°W | |
| North Island | Clay Township | St. Clair | 42.62111°N 82.65083°W | |
| Russell Island | Clay Township | St. Clair | 42.60833°N 82.52889°W | |
| Sand Island | Clay Township | St. Clair | 42.55278°N 82.71778°W | |
| Strawberry Island | Clay Township | St. Clair | 42.59806°N 82.70944°W | |

== Detroit River ==
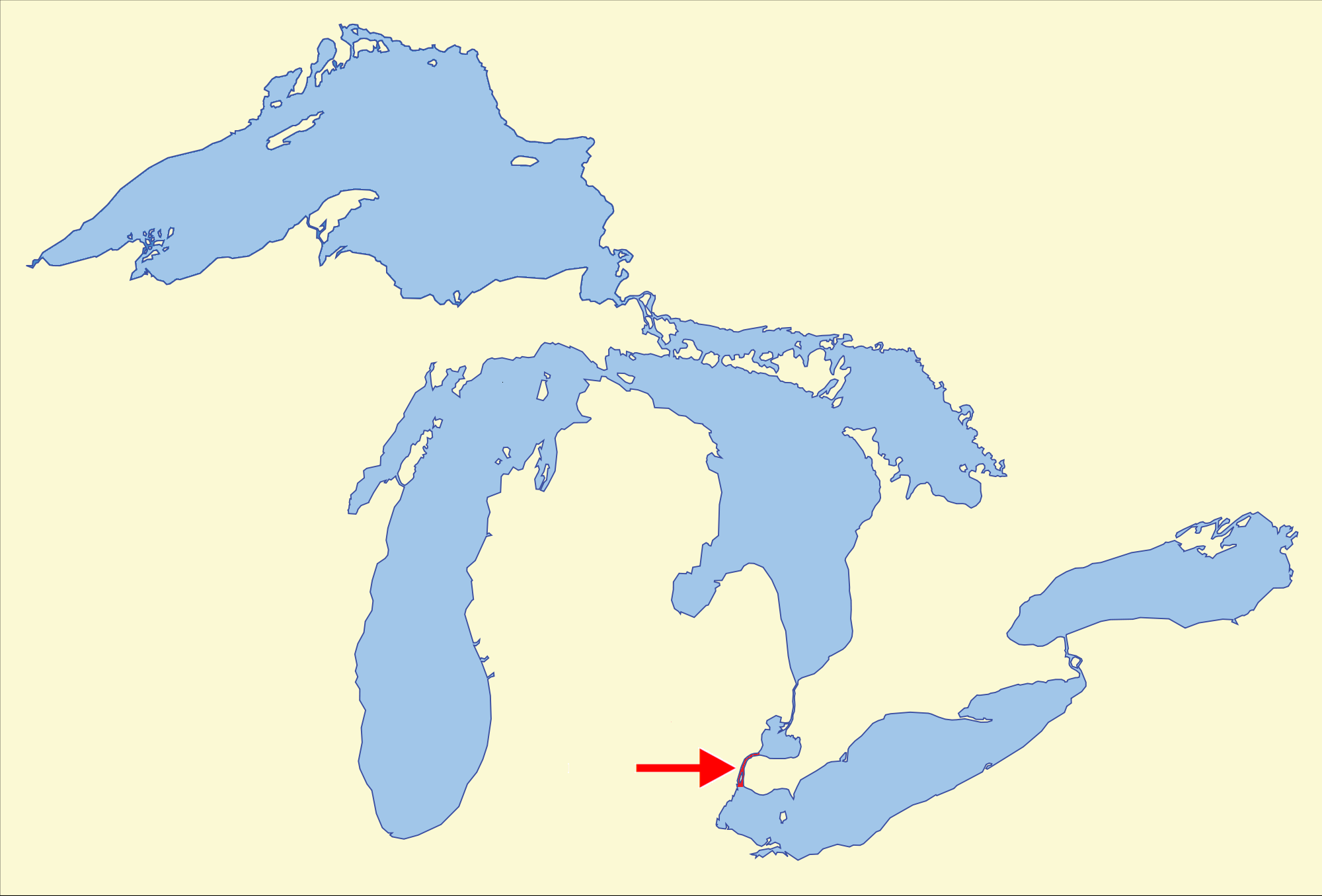
Detroit River

The Detroit River runs for 24 nautical miles (44 km; 28 mi) and connects Lake St. Clair to Lake Erie. For its entire length, it carries the international border between the United States and Canada. Some islands belong to Ontario in Canada and are not included in the list below. All islands on the American side belong to Wayne County. Portions of the southern portion of the river serve as wildlife refuges as part of the Detroit River International Wildlife Refuge. The largest and most populous island is Grosse Ile. Most of the islands are around and closely connected to Grosse Ile.

| Island | Municipality | County | Coordinates | Ref |
|---|---|---|---|---|
| Belle Isle | Detroit | Wayne | 42.34305°N 82.97444°W | |
| Calf Island | Grosse Ile Township | Wayne | 42.10305°N 83.17916°W | |
| Celeron Island | Grosse Ile Township | Wayne | 42.08083°N 83.17416°W | |
| Cherry Island | Brownstown Township | Wayne | 42.08056°N 83.19472°W | |
| Edmond Island | Gibraltar | Wayne | 42.08361°N 83.19472°W | |
| Elba Island | Grosse Ile Township | Wayne | 42.10250°N 83.14750°W | |
| Elizabeth Park | Trenton | Wayne | 42.13222°N 83.18027°W | |
| Fox Island | Grosse Ile Township | Wayne | 42.10611°N 83.14138°W | |
| Grassy Island | Grosse Ile Township | Wayne | 42.22250°N 83.13472°W | |
| Grosse Ile | Grosse Ile Township | Wayne | 42.12667°N 83.15916°W | |
| Hall Island | Gibraltar | Wayne | 42.08833°N 83.19333°W | |
| Humbug Island | Gibraltar | Wayne | 42.10889°N 83.18500°W | |
| Hickory Island | Grosse Ile Township | Wayne | 42.08833°N 83.15500°W | |
| Horse Island | Gibraltar | Wayne | 42.08194°N 83.18555°W | |
| Main Island | Gibraltar | Wayne | 42.08917°N 83.18861°W | |
| Mamajuda Island | Grosse Ile Township | Wayne | 42.19222°N 83.13611°W | |
| Meso Island | Grosse Ile Township | Wayne | 42.09305°N 83.15166°W | |
| Mud Island | Ecorse | Wayne | 42.23861°N 83.14000°W | |
| Powder House Island | Grosse Ile Township | Wayne | 42.10722°N 83.13555°W | |
| Round Island | Grosse Ile Township | Wayne | 42.09222°N 83.16694°W | |
| Stony Island | Grosse Ile Township | Wayne | 42.12805°N 83.13083°W | |
| Sturgeon Bar | Brownstown Township | Wayne | 42.06833°N 83.18861°W | |
| Sugar Island | Grosse Ile Township | Wayne | 42.09138°N 83.14416°W | |
| Swan Island | Grosse Ile Township | Wayne | 42.09916°N 83.17388°W | |
| Zug Island | River Rouge | Wayne | 42.28388°N 83.11194°W | |

== St. Marys River ==
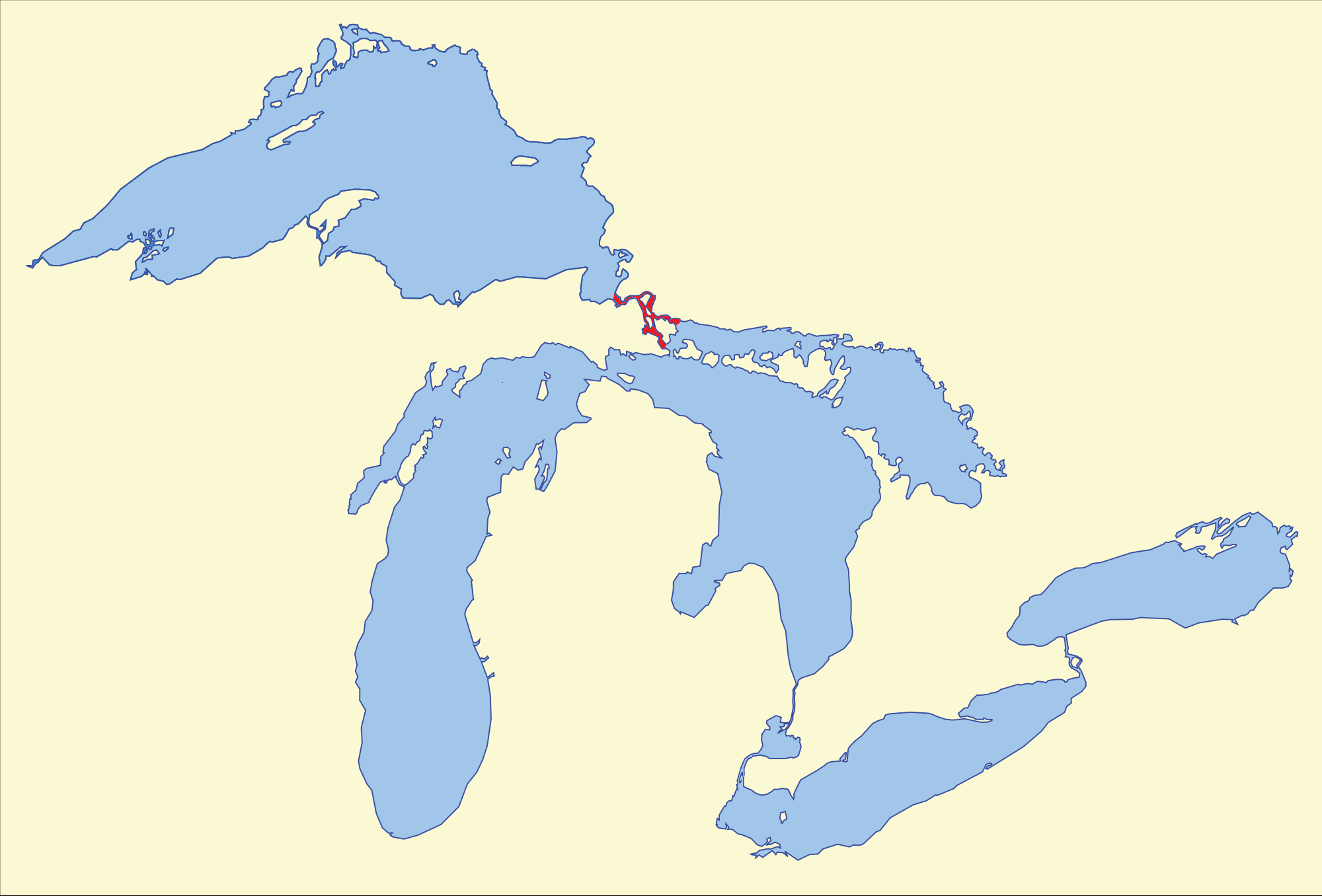
St. Marys River

The St. Marys River connects Lake Superior and Lake Huron at the easternmost point of the Upper Peninsula. It carries the international border throughout its length, and some of the islands belong to neighboring Ontario. The largest of Michigan's islands in the river are Sugar Island and Neebish Island. Wider portions of the river are designated as Lake George, Lake Nicolet, and the Munuscong Lake. The whole length of the Michigan portion of the river is part of Chippewa County.

| Island | Municipality | County | Coordinates | Ref |
|---|---|---|---|---|
| Advance Island | Sugar Island Township | Chippewa | 46.37806°N 84.14444°W | |
| Bass Reef Island | Raber Township | Chippewa | 46.10444°N 83.99722°W | |
| Chicken Islands | Soo Township | Chippewa | 46.30667°N 84.12778°W | |
| Cook Island | Sugar Island Township | Chippewa | 46.49444°N 84.26528°W | |
| Duck Island | Sugar Island Township | Chippewa | 46.36389°N 84.14278°W | |
| Edward Island | Raber Township | Chippewa | 46.09944°N 83.97833°W | |
| Gem Island | Sugar Island Township | Chippewa | 46.43250°N 84.17722°W | |
| Gull Island | Raber Township | Chippewa | 46.17056°N 84.21750°W | |
| Hart Island | Soo Township | Chippewa | 46.09111°N 83.98583°W | |
| Hen Island | Soo Township | Chippewa | 46.31417°N 84.13306°W | |
| Hog Island | Sugar Island Township | Chippewa | 46.49167°N 84.26944°W | |
| Island Number Four | Soo Township | Chippewa | 46.47333°N 84.28750°W | |
| Island Number One | Soo Township | Chippewa | 46.48056°N 84.29306°W | |
| Island Number Three | Soo Township | Chippewa | 46.47611°N 84.30111°W | |
| Island Number Two | Soo Township | Chippewa | 46.47611°N 84.29778°W | |
| Lime Island | Raber Township | Chippewa | 46.08639°N 83.99889°W | |
| Love Island | Raber Township | Chippewa | 46.10139°N 83.98972°W | |
| Moon Island | Raber Township | Chippewa | 46.21722°N 84.16861°W | |
| Munuscong Island | Pickford Township | Chippewa | 46.21417°N 84.24028°W | |
| Neebish Island | Soo Township | Chippewa | 46.28333°N 84.15833°W | |
| Pilot Island | Raber Township | Chippewa | 46.17611°N 84.13333°W | |
| Pine Island | Raber Township | Chippewa | 46.17556°N 84.20583°W | |
| Pipe Island | Raber Township | Chippewa | 46.17556°N 84.20583°W | |
| Rains Island | Soo Township | Chippewa | 46.25778°N 84.11139°W | |
| Rock Island | Sugar Island Township | Chippewa | 46.38639°N 84.14583°W | |
| Round Island | Superior Township | Chippewa | 46.10889°N 84.02111°W | |
| Round Island | Raber Township | Chippewa | 46.44278°N 84.51583°W | |
| Sand Island | Soo Township | Chippewa | 46.31611°N 84.20472°W | |
| Steamboat Island | Raber Township | Chippewa | 46.18444°N 84.19167°W | |
| Sugar Island | Sugar Island Township | Chippewa | 46.43333°N 84.21667°W | |
| Twin Island | Raber Township | Chippewa | 46.15611°N 84.08583°W | |
| Two Tree Island | Raber Township | Chippewa | 46.20806°N 84.08694°W | |

== Inland islands ==
Michigan has numerous inland lakes and rivers that also contain their own islands. The following also lists the body of water in which these islands are located. Five islands below (* and highlighted in green) are actually islands within an island; they are contained within inland lakes in Isle Royale.

| Island | Body of water | Municipality | County | Coordinates | Ref |
|---|---|---|---|---|---|
| Apple Island | Orchard Lake | Orchard Lake Village | Oakland | 42.58916°N 83.37166°W | |
| Batchelors Island | St. Joseph River | Buchanan Township | Berrien | 41.85111°N 86.36528°W | |
| Bellevue Island | Lake Orion | Orion Township | Oakland | 42.78250°N 83.25278°W | |
| Birch Island | Tippy Dam Pond | Norman Township | Manistee | 44.25778°N 85.89056°W | |
| Birch Isle * | Lake Richie | Houghton Township | Keweenaw | 48.04917°N 88.69083°W | |
| Bird Island | Lake Oakland | Independence Township | Oakland | 42.70028°N 83.36528°W | |
| Blackbird Island | Gun Lake | Yankee Springs | Barry | 42.59444°N 85.53361°W | |
| Blain Island | Lotus Lake | Springfield Township | Oakland | 42.69722°N 83.43056°W | |
| Blue Gill Island | Lobdell Lake | Argentine Township | Genesee | 42.78333°N 83.82556°W | |
| Brush Island | Long Lake | Long Lake Township | Grand Traverse | 44.73667°N 85.76639°W | |
| Burnt Island | Manistique Lake | Portage Township | Mackinac | 46.22889°N 85.73417°W | |
| Carrollton Bar | Saginaw River | Carrollton Township | Saginaw | 43.45944°N 83.91722°W | |
| Case Island | Lake Fenton | Fenton Township | Genesee | 42.84167°N 83.71917°W | |
| Cedar Island | Orchard Lake | Norman Township | Manistee | 44.25278°N 85.90361°W | |
| Cedar Island | Tippy Dam Pond | Norman Township | Oakland | 42.59167°N 83.38056°W | |
| Clark Island | Goguac Lake | Battle Creek | Calhoun | 42.28528°N 85.21583°W | |
| Dam Island | Tippy Dam Pond | Norman Township | Manistee | 44.26167°N 85.93556°W | |
| Dawsons Island | White Lake | Highland Township | Oakland | 42.67417°N 83.55944°W | |
| Debs Island | St. Joseph River | Buchanan Township | Berrien | 41.85361°N 86.36500°W | |
| Dermo Island | Grand River | Grand Haven | Ottawa | 43.05278°N 86.16944°W | |
| Diamond Island | Diamond Lake | Cassopolis | Cass | 41.90250°N 85.97611°W | |
| Dornbos Island | Grand River | Grand Haven | Ottawa | 43.07222°N 86.21250°W | |
| Draper Island | Lac Vieux Desert | Watersmeet Township | Gogebic | 46.14167°N 89.08472°W | |
| Eagle Island | Bald Eagle Lake | Brandon Township | Oakland | 42.81917°N 83.44333°W | |
| Eagle Nest Island * | Siskiwit Lake | Houghton Township | Keweenaw | 47.99306°N 88.79250°W | |
| Eastmans Island | Grand River | Grand Haven | Ottawa | 43.07056°N 86.20000°W | |
| Fitch Island | Tippy Dam Pond | Norman Township | Manistee | 44.25528°N 85.91167°W | |
| Florence Island | Fife Lake | Fife Lake Township | Grand Traverse | 44.56306°N 85.34944°W | |
| Flynn Island | Higgins Lake | Gerrish Township | Roscommon | 44.47972°N 84.72583°W | |
| Foleys Island | River Raisin | Monroe | Monroe | 41.89278°N 83.37278°W | |
| Foster Island | Manistique Lake | Lakefield Township | Luce | 46.24972°N 85.81306°W | |
| Fordson Island | River Rouge | Dearborn | Wayne | 42.29361°N 83.14778°W | |
| Fox Island | Long Lake | Long Lake Township | Grand Traverse | 44.71917°N 85.74694°W | |
| Goat Island | Center Lake | Leoni Township | Jackson | 42.21417°N 84.31611°W | |
| Government Island | Tippy Dam Pond | Norman Township | Manistee | 44.26000°N 85.88750°W | |
| Green Point | Saginaw River | Saginaw | Saginaw | 43.38389°N 83.97306°W | |
| Gull Island | Manistique Lake | Portage Township | Mackinac | 46.24111°N 85.81000°W | |
| Happy Island | Sage Lake | Hill Township | Ogemaw | 44.34694°N 83.93667°W | |
| Harbor Island | Grand River | Grand Haven | Ottawa | 43.07333°N 86.22528°W | |
| Harrington Island | Portage Lake | Stanton Township | Houghton | 47.15833°N 88.63500°W | |
| Hastings Island * | Lake Richie | Houghton Township | Keweenaw | 48.04639°N 88.69417°W | |
| Helen Island | Fife Lake | Fife Lake Township | Grand Traverse | 44.56500°N 85.35333°W | |
| Holy Island | Lake Charlevoix | Eveline Township | Charlevoix | 45.23194°N 85.16667°W | |
| Hubbels Island | White Lake | Highland Township | Oakland | 42.66167°N 83.56889°W | |
| Iyopawa Island | Coldwater Lake | Kinderhook Township | Branch | 41.81361°N 84.97333°W | |
| Joys Island | Tahquamenon River | McMillan Township | Luce | 46.53111°N 85.29111°W | |
| Kauslers Island | River Raisin | Monroe | Monroe | 41.89111°N 83.37639°W | |
| Long Island | Bass Lake | Long Lake Township | Grand Traverse | 44.69194°N 85.71000°W | |
| Long Island | Long Lake | Long Lake Township | Grand Traverse | 44.72750°N 85.74917°W | |
| Loud Island | Van Etten Lake | Oscoda Township | Iosco | 44.48194°N 83.37306°W | |
| Maple Island | Maple Lake | Paw Paw | Van Buren | 42.23111°N 85.88861°W | |
| Maple Island | Center Lake | Leoni Township | Jackson | 42.20889°N 84.31917°W | |
| Marina Island | St. Joseph River | St. Joseph | Berrien | 42.10556°N 86.47083°W | |
| Martinique Island | Grand River | Grand Haven | Ottawa | 43.05833°N 86.19028°W | |
| Memory Isle | Rocky River | Three Rivers | St. Joseph | 41.94444°N 85.63667°W | |
| Merryman Island | Rosebush Lake | Holmes Township | Menominee | 45.49556°N 87.78833°W | |
| Middle Ground Island | Saginaw River | Bay City | Bay | 43.57139°N 83.90667°W | |
| Middle Island | Sage Lake | Hill Township | Ogemaw | 44.34972°N 83.94167°W | |
| Millman Island | Huron River | Berlin Township | Monroe | 42.04306°N 83.21056°W | |
| Near Island | Lac Vieux Desert | Watersmeet Township | Gogebic | 46.13972°N 89.09167°W | |
| Norton Island | South Manistique Lake | Newton Township | Mackinac | 46.16083°N 85.76361°W | |
| Oden Island | Crooked Lake | Little Traverse | Emmet | 45.41472°N 84.82000°W | |
| Ojibway Island | Saginaw River | Saginaw | Saginaw | 43.41694°N 83.95639°W | |
| Orangeville Island | Gun Lake | Yankee Springs | Barry | 42.59222°N 85.51694°W | |
| Pardee Island | Lake Chapin | Berrien Springs | Berrien | 41.94722°N 86.33056°W | |
| Park Island | Round Lake | Charlevoix | Charlevoix | 45.31639°N 85.24806°W | |
| Park Island | Lake Orion | Orion Township | Oakland | 42.77861°N 83.24417°W | |
| Pells Island | Douglas Lake | Munro Township | Cheboygan | 45.57694°N 84.70917°W | |
| Picnic Island | Long Lake | Long Lake Township | Grand Traverse | 44.73278°N 85.74944°W | |
| Ramsay Island | Lake Michigamme | Michigamme Township | Marquette | 46.52056°N 88.05389°W | |
| Reimers Island | Duck Lake | Watersmeet Township | Gogebic | 46.20083°N 89.22111°W | |
| Rowe Island | Morrow Lake | Comstock Township | Kalamazoo | 42.28000°N 85.46806°W | |
| Ryan Island * | Siskiwit Lake | Houghton Township | Keweenaw | 48.01000°N 88.77083°W | |
| Scaddens Island | Fortune Lake | Crystal Falls | Iron | 46.08667°N 88.42472°W | |
| Sisters Island | River Raisin | Monroe | Monroe | 41.91944°N 83.40417°W | |
| Skull Island | Saginaw River | Bay City | Bay | 43.55500°N 83.90306°W | |
| South Island | Long Lake | Long Lake Township | Grand Traverse | 44.71444°N 85.74833°W | |
| Stage Island | Lobdell Lake | Argentine Township | Genesee | 42.78472°N 83.83167°W | |
| Sterling Island | River Raisin | Monroe | Monroe | 41.90833°N 83.37750°W | |
| Stony Island | Saginaw River | Bay City | Bay | 43.54556°N 83.90500°W | |
| Stony Point Island | Stony Point | Frenchtown Township | Monroe | 41.93805°N 83.26555°W | |
| Sundstrum Island | Lake Michigamme | Michigamme Township | Marquette | 46.52500°N 88.10139°W | |
| Teakettle Island * | Siskiwit Lake | Houghton Township | Keweenaw | 48.01361°N 88.76333°W | |
| Troque Island | Muskegon River | Bridgeton Township | Newaygo | 43.32500°N 86.01417°W | |
| Victoria Island | Lake Orion | Orion Township | Oakland | 42.78500°N 83.25556°W | |
| Vince Island | Goguac Lake | Battle Creek | Calhoun | 42.28333°N 85.21778°W | |
| Virgin Island | Tippy Dam Pond | Dickson Township | Manistee | 44.27667°N 85.87472°W | |
| Ward Island | Goguac Lake | Battle Creek | Calhoun | 42.29306°N 85.20528°W | |
| Windmill Island | Lake Macatawa | Holland | Ottawa | 42.79944°N 86.09583°W | |
| Yankee Spring Island | Gun Lake | Yankee Springs | Barry | 42.59528°N 85.51194°W | |
| Zerons Island | Sage Lake | Hill Township | Ogemaw | 44.35389°N 83.94833°W | |

=== Grand Lake ===
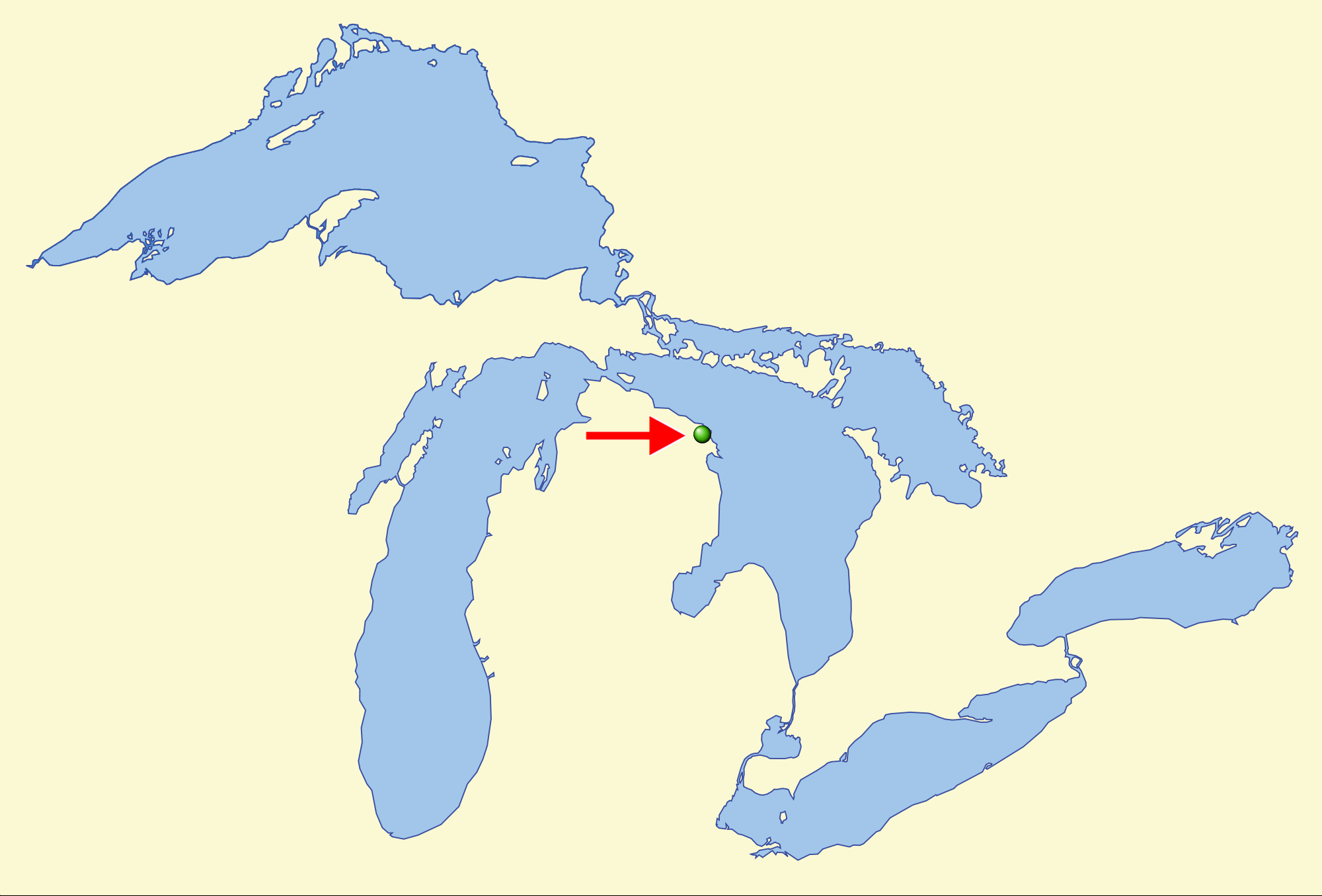
Grand Lake

Grand Lake is a large 8.8 square miles (23 km^{2}) lake in Presque Isle County. While it is not the largest inland lake in Michigan, it does contain the most inland islands that are officially named. At its shortest distance, it is located less than one mile (1.6 kilometres) from Lake Huron, but the two are not connected. Grand Lake contains 14 islands, of which Grand Island is by far the largest.

| Island | Municipality | County | Coordinates | Ref |
|---|---|---|---|---|
| Allen Island | Krakow Township | Presque Isle | 45.32250°N 83.54750°W | |
| Applegate Island | Krakow Township | Presque Isle | 45.31139°N 83.54472°W | |
| Bear Island | Krakow Township | Presque Isle | 45.31972°N 83.55083°W | |
| Brown Island | Presque Isle Township | Presque Isle | 45.28611°N 83.48000°W | |
| Burnt Island | Presque Isle Township | Presque Isle | 45.29361°N 83.49194°W | |
| Cedar Island | Presque Isle Township | Presque Isle | 45.29333°N 83.48306°W | |
| Crescent Island | Presque Isle Township | Presque Isle | 45.30417°N 83.48361°W | |
| Grand Island | Presque Isle Township | Presque Isle | 45.30694°N 83.50972°W | |
| Horseshoe Island | Presque Isle Township | Presque Isle | 45.30056°N 83.49111°W | |
| Indian Island | Presque Isle Township | Presque Isle | 45.32472°N 83.55167°W | |
| Macombers Island | Krakow / Presque Isle | Presque Isle | 45.31778°N 83.52000°W | |
| Round Island | Presque Isle Township | Presque Isle | 45.30250°N 83.49250°W | |
| Tanglewood Island | Presque Isle Township | Presque Isle | 45.29833°N 83.48972°W | |
| Three Sisters Island | Presque Isle Township | Presque Isle | 45.30167°N 83.51917°W | |

== See also ==
- Geography of Michigan
- Great Lakes
- Islands of the Great Lakes
- Populated islands of the Great Lakes
- Islands of the Midwest
- List of islands in Isle Royale National Park
- List of islands in the Detroit River
- List of Michigan islands in Lake Huron
- Ferries in Michigan
