= Amygdaloid =

Amygdaloid, derived from the ancient Greek for almond, may refer to:

- The amygdala in the brain
- Any shape resembling an almond nut
- Amygdule, or amygdale, a mineral filled vesicle in volcanic rock, amygdaloidal texture
- Amygdaloid Island, an island in Lake Superior
