= List of islands in Isle Royale National Park =

Islands in Isle Royale National Park
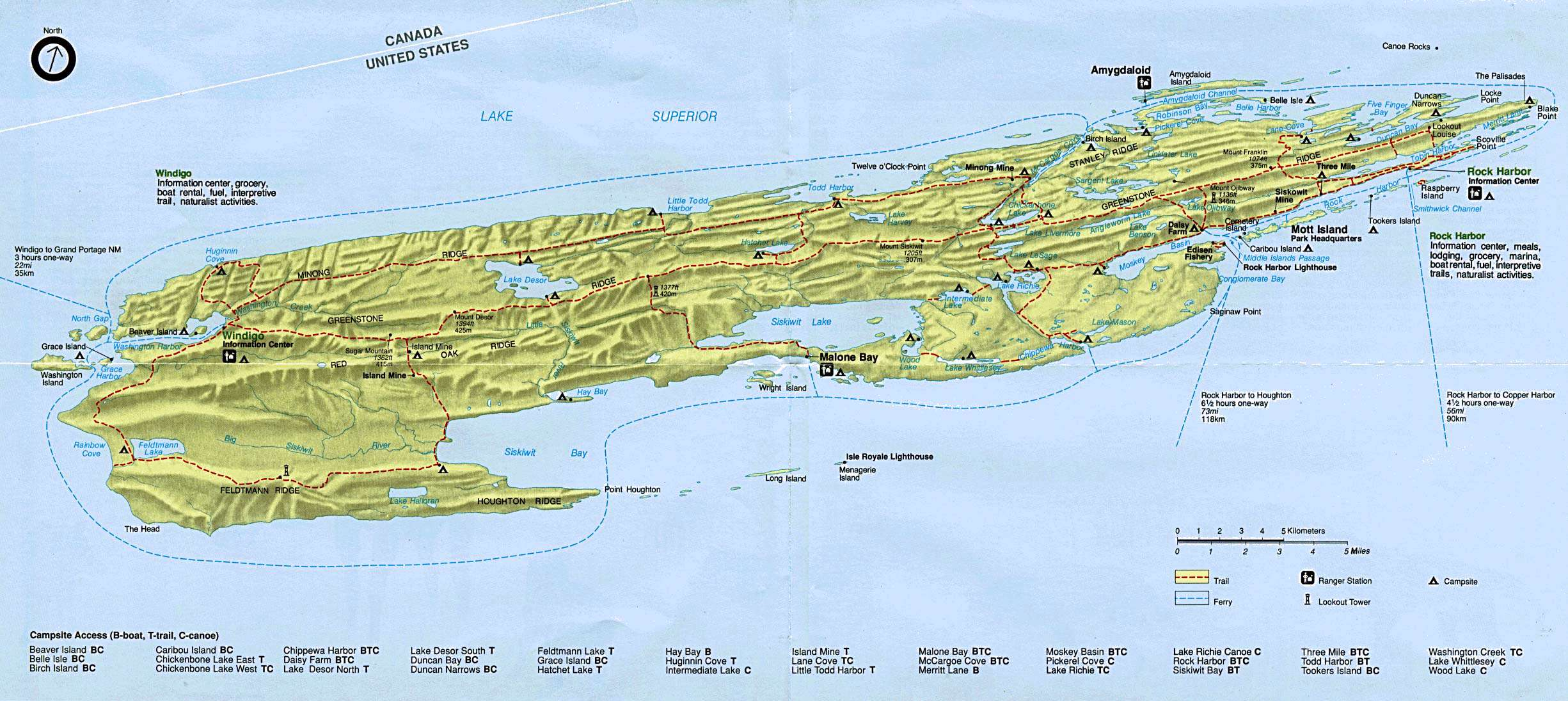
- Detailed map of the national park

- Location within the state of Michigan Location within the United States

Geography
- Location: Lake Superior
- Coordinates: 48°00′N 88°51′W
- Total islands: 450 (113 named)
- Major islands: Isle Royale
- Area: 209 sq mi (540 km^{2})

Administration
- United States National Park Service
- U.S. state: Michigan
- County: Keweenaw County
- Townships: Eagle Harbor and Houghton

Demographics
- Population: 0 (permanent)

Additional information
- Time zone: EST (UTC-5)
  - Summer (DST): EDT (UTC-4)

The following is a list of islands in Isle Royale National Park. Located in Lake Superior, Isle Royale is the second largest island in the Great Lakes system, after only Manitoulin Island in Lake Huron. At 206.7 square miles (535 km^{2}), the island of Isle Royale itself is the third largest island in the contiguous United States (after Long Island and Padre Island) and is the fourth largest lake island in the world. Isle Royale National Park has a total area of 894 square miles (2,320 km^{2}), of which 209 square miles (540 km^{2}) is land.

Isle Royale National Park consists of one large island (Isle Royale) surrounded by over 450 smaller islands, although approximately 110 of these islands are formally named. While Isle Royale National Park contains no permanent population and is governed by the National Park Service, the area itself is part of Keweenaw County. The northern half of the park is administered locally by Houghton Township, while the southern half is part of Eagle Harbor Township.

== List of islands ==
| Island | Coordinates | GNIS ID |
|---|---|---|
| Amygdaloid Island | 48°09′04″N 88°37′14″W | 1618259 |
| Annie Island | 48°10′24″N 88°26′18″W | 1618508 |
| Arch Island | 48°03′49″N 88°47′37″W | 620199 |
| Bailey Island | 48°09′15″N 88°28′49″W | 620450 |
| Barnum Island | 47°52′40″N 89°14′01″W | 620634 |
| Bat Island | 48°08′47″N 88°27′53″W | 620727 |
| Battleship Island | 48°10′29″N 88°29′54″W | 620761 |
| Beaver Island | 47°54′28″N 89°10′12″W | 620927 |
| Belle Isle | 48°09′09″N 88°35′22″W | 621052 |
| Birch Isle (Note: This lake island can be defined as an island in a lake on an island in a lake, as it is located in a lake (Lake Richie or Siskiwit Lake) that is on an island (Isle Royale) within another lake (Lake Superior). The main island of Isle Royale contains numerous small interior lakes that may also have some unnamed islands.) | 48°02′57″N 88°41′27″W | 1618264 |
| Bobs Island | 48°10′04″N 88°27′20″W | 1618506 |
| Booth Island | 47°52′44″N 89°13′34″W | 621734 |
| Bottle Island | 47°51′58″N 89°15′59″W | 621764 |
| Boys Island | 48°10′53″N 88°25′58″W | 621834 |
| Burnt Island | 48°05′31″N 88°34′13″W | 622313 |
| Burnt Island | 48°08′49″N 88°34′55″W | 622314 |
| Captain Kidd Island | 48°09′53″N 88°34′17″W | 622705 |
| Castle Island | 47°55′21″N 88°49′13″W | 622865 |
| Cemetery Island | 48°05′46″N 88°34′14″W | 622967 |
| Center Island | 48°08′29″N 88°29′30″W | 622978 |
| Channel Island | 47°58′32″N 88°48′30″W | 623078 |
| Chippers Island | 48°09′01″N 88°34′19″W | 1618486 |
| Clay Island | 48°08′41″N 88°35′32″W | 623393 |
| Cork Island | 48°09′05″N 88°34′36″W | 623836 |
| Davidson Island | 48°07′30″N 88°30′50″W | 624329 |
| Dean Island | 48°09′27″N 88°33′10″W | 624426 |
| Diamond Island | 48°10′10″N 88°32′25″W | 624633 |
| Dog Island | 48°10′47″N 88°26′06″W | 1618512 |
| Eagle Island | 48°08′59″N 88°34′14″W | 1618487 |
| Eagle Nest Island | 47°59′35″N 88°43′46″W | 625091 |
| East Caribou Island | 48°06′06″N 88°33′19″W | 625161 |
| Edwards Island | 48°10′20″N 88°26′00″W | 625396 |
| Emerson Island | 48°09′49″N 88°27′45″W | 1618510 |
| Fire Island | 48°08′28″N 88°30′37″W | 625981 |
| Fisher Island | 48°08′58″N 88°31′31″W | 1618481 |
| Flag Island | 48°09′52″N 88°25′52″W | 626129 |
| Fryett Island | 48°08′41″N 88°35′52″W | 1618480 |
| Gale Island | 48°09′53″N 88°27′40″W | 626598 |
| Glenns Island | 48°09′39″N 88°27′39″W | 1618505 |
| Grace Island | 47°52′53″N 89°13′10″W | 627058 |
| Green Island | 48°09′45″N 88°33′23″W | 627300 |
| Green Isle | 48°04′12″N 88°46′39″W | 627301 |
| Gull Islands (Note: Gull Islands consists of several small islands very close to the Canada–United States border and is the northernmost point of land in the state of Michigan. It is also the easternmost point of land in Isle Royale National Park.) | 48°15′44″N 88°15′53″W | 1620097 |
| Hastings Island | 48°02′47″N 88°41′39″W | 1618277 |
| Hat Island | 47°59′00″N 88°46′23″W | 627930 |
| Hawk Island | 48°06′12″N 88°43′32″W | 1618278 |
| Heron Island | 48°07′35″N 88°30′11″W | 628141 |
| Hog Island | 48°09′28″N 88°28′18″W | 1618502 |
| Horn Island | 48°09′22″N 88°28′35″W | 628589 |
| Horner Island | 48°08′31″N 88°36′27″W | 628592 |
| Howe Island | 48°09′54″N 88°27′31″W | 1618513 |
| Inner Hill Island | 47°58′26″N 88°49′09″W | 629048 |
| Inner Island | 47°58′26″N 88°49′09″W | 629049 |
| Isle Royale | 48°00′02″N 88°50′00″W | 1618306 |
| Johns Island | 47°53′20″N 89°14′30″W | 629318 |
| Johnson Island | 48°08′53″N 88°35′04″W | 629336 |
| Kamloops Island | 48°04′32″N 88°47′08″W | 629454 |
| Little Siskiwit Island | 47°56′32″N 88°53′40″W | 630769 |
| Lone Tree Island | 48°08′15″N 88°29′58″W | 630897 |
| Long Island | 48°10′42″N 88°26′01″W | 630913 |
| Long Island | 47°56′05″N 88°47′58″W | 630912 |
| Lucky Island | 48°10′23″N 88°26′36″W | 1618507 |
| Mad Island | 48°07′25″N 88°30′35″W | 631306 |
| Malone Island | 47°58′50″N 88°47′32″W | 631365 |
| Menagerie Island (Note: Menagerie Island contains the historic Isle Royale Light.) | 47°56′52″N 88°45′43″W | 632094 |
| Merritt Island | 48°11′04″N 88°25′40″W | 632138 |
| Middle Islands | 48°05′28″N 88°34′36″W | 632256 |
| Minong Island | 48°09′49″N 88°27′26″W | 632472 |
| Mott Island | 48°06′40″N 88°32′08″W | 632763 |
| Net Island | 48°10′25″N 88°32′59″W | 633304 |
| Newman Island | 48°10′01″N 88°27′28″W | 633370 |
| North Government Island | 48°10′46″N 88°25′16″W | 633370 |
| North Rock (Note: North Rock is the southernmost and westernmost named island in Isle Royale National Park. However, there are several unnamed islands nearby, including the historic Rock of Ages Light.) | 47°51′51″N 89°16′35″W | 633636 |
| Ollies Dogs Rocks | 48°06′58″N 88°42′56″W | 1618298 |
| Outer Hill Island | 48°07′11″N 88°31′03″W | 634226 |
| Outer Island | 47°58′20″N 88°48′41″W | 634227 |
| Park Place Island | 48°09′01″N 88°28′59″W | 2097219 |
| Passage Island (Note: Passage Island contains the Passage Island Light, which is the northernmost manmade structure in the state of Michigan.) | 48°14′01″N 88°21′03″W | 634447 |
| Paul Islands | 47°54′52″N 88°50′57″W | 634447 |
| Pete Island | 48°10′27″N 88°28′18″W | 634693 |
| Picnic Island | 48°08′09″N 88°30′56″W | 1618488 |
| Porter Island | 48°10′29″N 88°26′39″W | 635305 |
| Rabbit Island | 48°06′01″N 88°33′47″W | 635581 |
| Raspberry Island | 48°08′32″N 88°28′25″W | 635655 |
| Redfin Island | 47°54′22″N 88°52′17″W | 635733 |
| Ross Island | 47°58′50″N 88°46′47″W | 636250 |
| Round Island | 48°07′39″N 88°40′24″W | 1618305 |
| Ryan Island | 48°00′36″N 88°46′15″W | 636435 |
| Salt Island | 47°53′10″N 89°13′10″W | 637136 |
| Savage Island | 48°09′43″N 88°27′58″W | 1618511 |
| Schooner Island | 47°59′03″N 88°45′21″W | 637429 |
| Shaw Island | 48°07′58″N 88°29′49″W | 637688 |
| Shiverette Island | 47°57′54″N 88°50′03″W | 637822 |
| Siskiwit Islands | 47°54′29″N 88°51′56″W | 638011 |
| Smith Island | 48°09′59″N 88°27′08″W | 638154 |
| Smithwick Island | 48°08′12″N 88°29′18″W | 638182 |
| South Government Island | 48°10′08″N 88°25′24″W | 638357 |
| Split Island | 48°10′39″N 88°25′29″W | 638517 |
| Star Island | 48°07′18″N 88°31′01″W | 638737 |
| Steamboat Island | 48°10′39″N 88°32′33″W | 638765 |
| Stone House Island | 47°56′24″N 88°47′03″W | 638868 |
| Tallman Island | 48°08′20″N 88°30′40″W | 1614552 |
| Taylor Island | 48°02′56″N 88°50′45″W | 1614626 |
| Teakettle Island | 48°00′49″N 88°45′48″W | 1614642 |
| Third Island | 48°10′57″N 88°25′31″W | 1614731 |
| Thompson Island | 47°53′31″N 89°13′52″W | 1614770 |
| Tookers Island | 48°07′45″N 88°30′11″W | 1614959 |
| Washington Island | 47°52′30″N 89°15′00″W | 1615807 |
| West Caribou Island | 48°05′47″N 88°33′59″W | 1616088 |
| Wheelock Island | 48°09′33″N 88°28′12″W | 1618503 |
| Wilson Island | 48°03′23″N 88°50′16″W | 1616576 |
| Wright Island | 47°58′14″N 88°49′36″W | 1616840 |

== See also ==
- Isle Royale National Park
- Lake Superior
- List of islands of Michigan
