= List of populated islands of the Great Lakes =

A map showing the Great Lakes

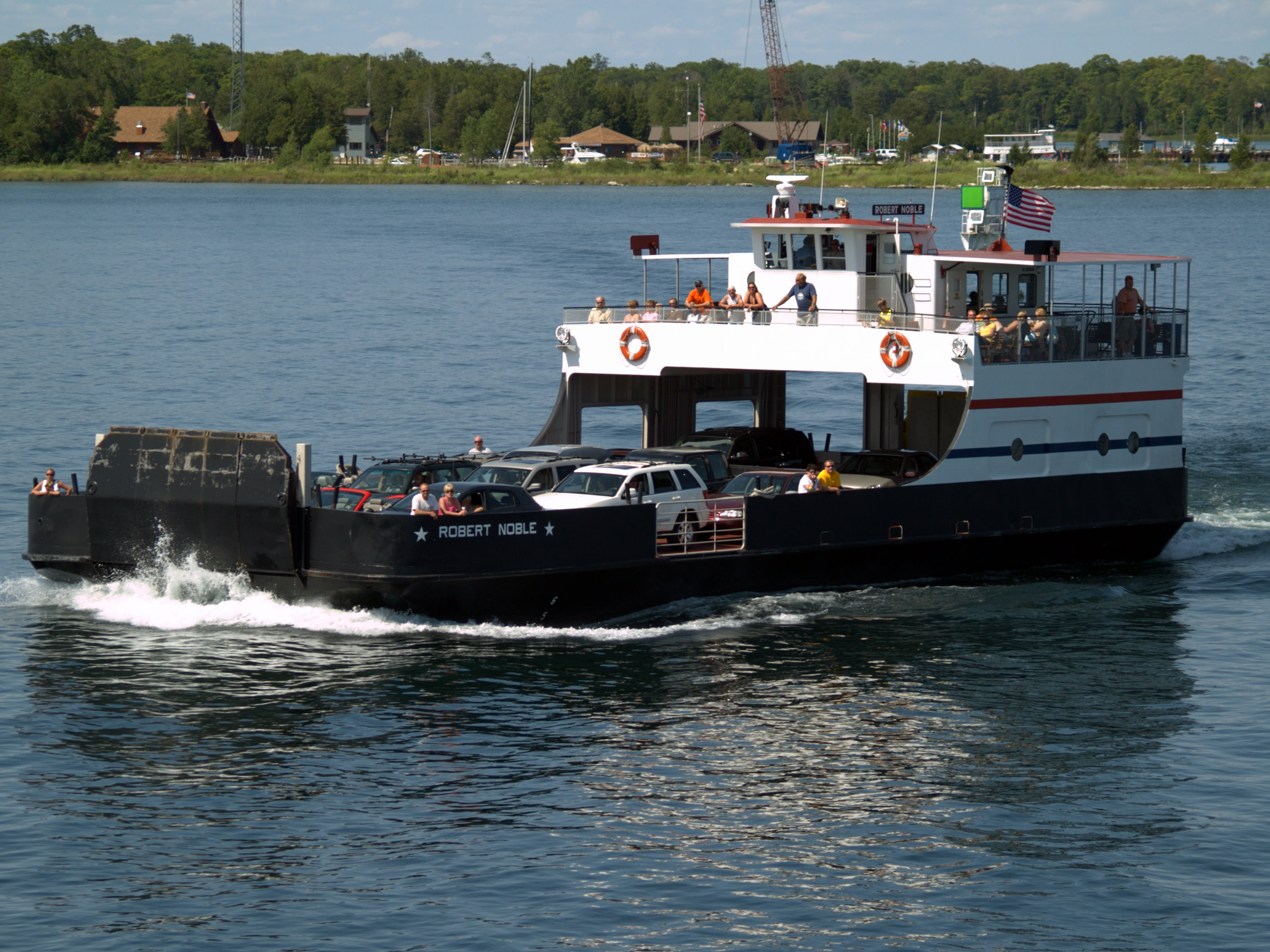
Populated islands are most commonly accessed by bridge or ferry boat, although some islands also have airports to facilitate air travel.

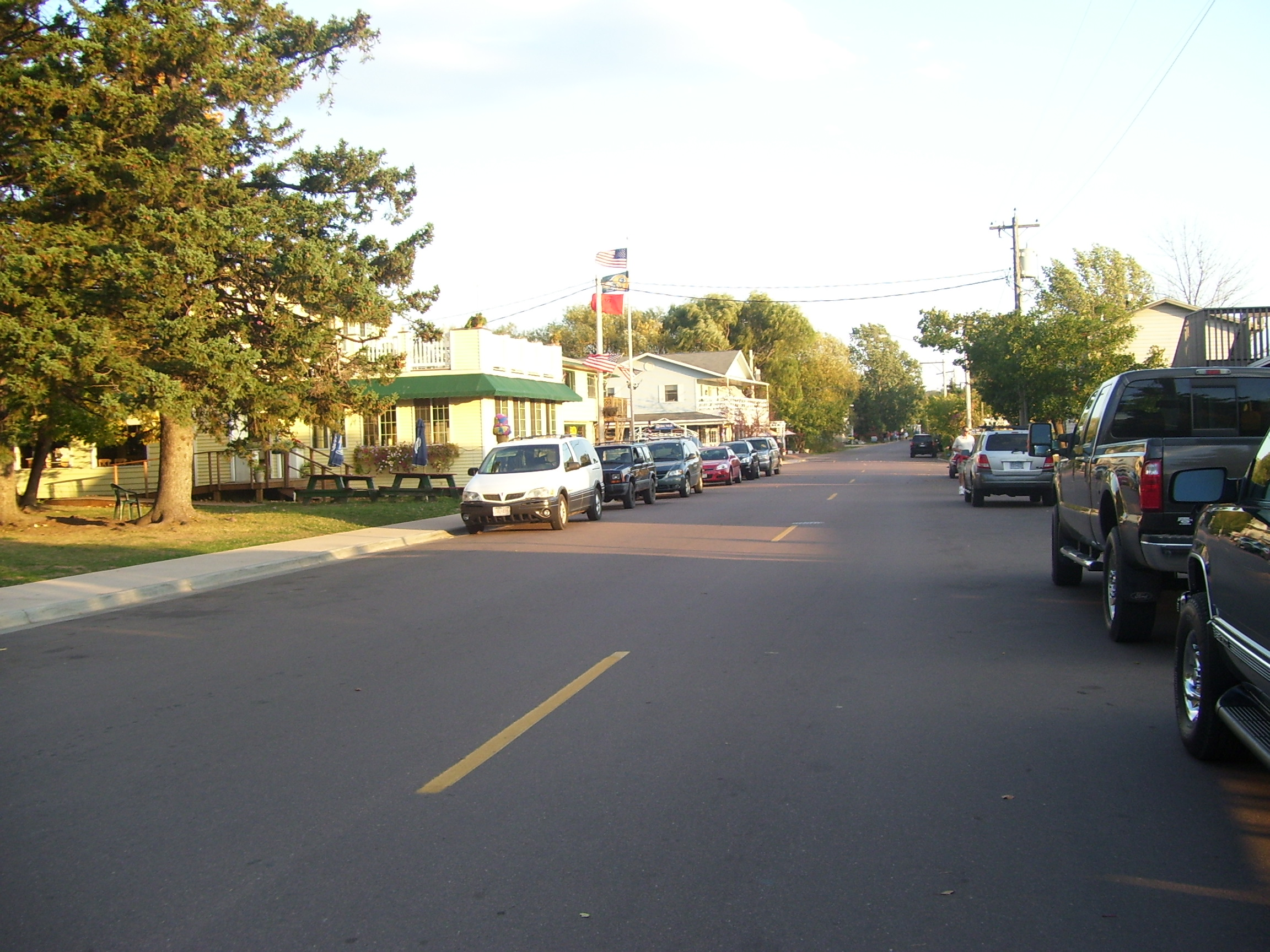
Tourism has helped the downtown sector of many island communities, such as the business district of La Pointe, Wisconsin, on Madeline Island.

The following is a list of populated islands of the Great Lakes and connecting rivers. The islands listed have a specified year-round population of over 50 residents.

Many islands are popular tourist destinations, and experience a sharp population increase during peak travel seasons.

In 2017, the Great Lakes Island Coalition was founded, a group dedicated to representing the interests of Great Lakes island residents. At an annual summit, related issues of discussion include environmental issues facing the Great Lakes island inhabitants, such as water levels and quality, invasive species, and even government policy topics, such as nuclear water storage and shipment in the Great Lakes region.

Location	Lake/River	State/Province	Country	Population	Note
Algonquin Island	Lake Ontario	Ontario	Canada	224	(Note: Part of the city of Toronto, this is one of the Toronto Islands, an archipelago in Toronto Harbour. Unlike most of the archipelago, which is made up of parkland and amusement facilities, this island is residential.)
Amherst Island	Lake Ontario	Ontario	Canada	450	(Note: At 70 square kilometers, the largest island wholly within Lake Ontario (Wolfe Island is larger, but the eastern end of the island is in the St. Lawrence River). The island, which is served by a ferry out of Millhaven, is entirely rural, and is located in Loyalist Township, Lennox and Addington County.)
Barrie Island	Lake Huron	Ontario	Canada	613	(Note: It is connected to Manitoulin Island by Highway 540A, which crosses the water via a causeway at the narrowest part of the strait.)
Beaver Island	Lake Michigan	Michigan	United States	616	(Note: The largest island in Lake Michigan and part of the Beaver Island archipelago of Michigan. It lies about 32 miles (50 km) from the city of Charlevoix on the mainland, and can be reached by air or boat. St. James is the name of the unincorporated community on the island.)
Bois Blanc Island (Michigan)	Lake Huron	Michigan	United States	100	(Note: Southeast of Mackinac Island and almost due north of the city of Cheboygan, Michigan. Plaunt Transportation is the sole provider of ferry services for the island.)
Bois Blanc Island (Ontario)	Detroit River	Ontario	Canada	60	(Note: Previously the site of the Boblo Island Amusement Park. It is accessed by private ferry from Amherstburg, Ontario)
Cayuga Island	Niagara River	New York	United States	1,000	(Note: Part of the city of Niagara Falls, New York, several miles upstream of the falls themselves. Part of the LaSalle neighborhood, the island contains a mix of parkland and middle-class housing.)
Centre Island	Lake Ontario	Ontario	Canada	356	(Note: The largest of the Toronto Islands, an archipelago located in Toronto's harbour. Most of the island's residences and businesses were demolished beginning in 1955 in favor of parkland and other recreational facilities.)
Christian Island	Lake Huron (Georgian Bay)	Ontario	Canada	679	
Drummond Island	Lake Huron	Michigan	United States	973	(Note: Consists of Drummond Township, Michigan. The island lies along the Canada–US border, and is adjacent to Manitoulin Island.)
Grand Island	Niagara River	New York	United States	21,389	(Note: A suburb of the city of Buffalo.)
Grosse Ile	Detroit River	Michigan	United States	10,777	(Note: The largest island in the Detroit River, it can be reached by two bridges or a small airport.)
Harsens Island	St. Clair River	Michigan	United States	900	(Note: Opposite Canada's Walpole Island. It is served by Champion's Auto Ferry.)
Kelleys Island	Lake Erie	Ohio	United States	256	(Note: Consists of the village of Kelleys Island, in Erie County.)
Mackinac Island	Lake Huron	Michigan	United States	583	(Note: An island and resort area, located between Michigan's Upper and Lower Peninsulas)
Madeline Island	Lake Superior	Wisconsin	United States	302	(Note: Contains the town of La Pointe. The island has a rich history and was once the home of a French fur trading post.)
Manitoulin Island	Lake Huron	Ontario	Canada	13,255	(Note: The largest island in a freshwater lake in the world. It has two incorporated towns and eight townships.)
Neebish Island	St. Marys River	Michigan	United States	89	(Note: There is one store and one church on the island, and a car ferry service operates April 1 to January 15.)
Parry Island	Lake Huron (Georgian Bay)	Ontario	Canada	399	
Pelee Island	Lake Erie	Ontario	Canada	230	(Note: The largest island in Lake Erie, and is the southernmost populated place in Canada.)
South Bass Island	Lake Erie	Ohio	United States	631	(Note: Part of Ottawa County, it contains the village of Put-in-Bay. Ferry service connects the community with Catawba Island, Kelleys Island, Port Clinton, and Sandusky.)
St. Joseph Island	Lake Huron	Ontario	Canada	2,320	(Note: The second largest island in Lake Huron. It is connected to the mainland by the Bernt Gilbertson Bridge spanning the North Channel of Lake Huron along Highway 548.)
Sugar Island	St. Marys River	Michigan	United States	2,000	(Note: The entire island constitutes Sugar Island Township in Chippewa County at the eastern tip of the Upper Peninsula.)
Walpole Island	St. Clair River	Ontario	Canada	1,878	(Note: Also known as Bkejwanong, it is the main part of Walpole Island 46 Indian reserve. It neighbors the U.S. Harsens Island. It is accessible by bridge from the Canadian mainland and ferry from the U.S.)
Washington Island	Lake Michigan	Wisconsin	United States	708	(Note: Located about 7 miles northeast of the tip of Door Peninsula in Door County, Wisconsin. The unincorporated community of Detroit Harbor is located on the island.)
Wolfe Island	Lake Ontario	Ontario	Canada	1,400	(Note: Located at the entrance to the Saint Lawrence River in Lake Ontario near Kingston, Ontario. The resident population is approximately 1400 people, but this number can double or triple during the summer months.)

== See also ==
- Islands of the Great Lakes — all the islands.

- Lists of Islands of the Great Lakes

- List of islands in lakes
- List of islands by population
