= Amygdaloid Island =

Island in Lake Superior, United States

- Location within Michigan Location within the United States

Geography
- Location: Lake Superior; Isle Royale National Park
- Coordinates: 48°09′04″N 88°37′14″W
- Area: 0.95 sq mi (2.5 km^{2})

Administration
- United States
- State: Michigan
- County: Keweenaw County
- Township: Eagle Harbor Township

Demographics
- Population: Uninhabited

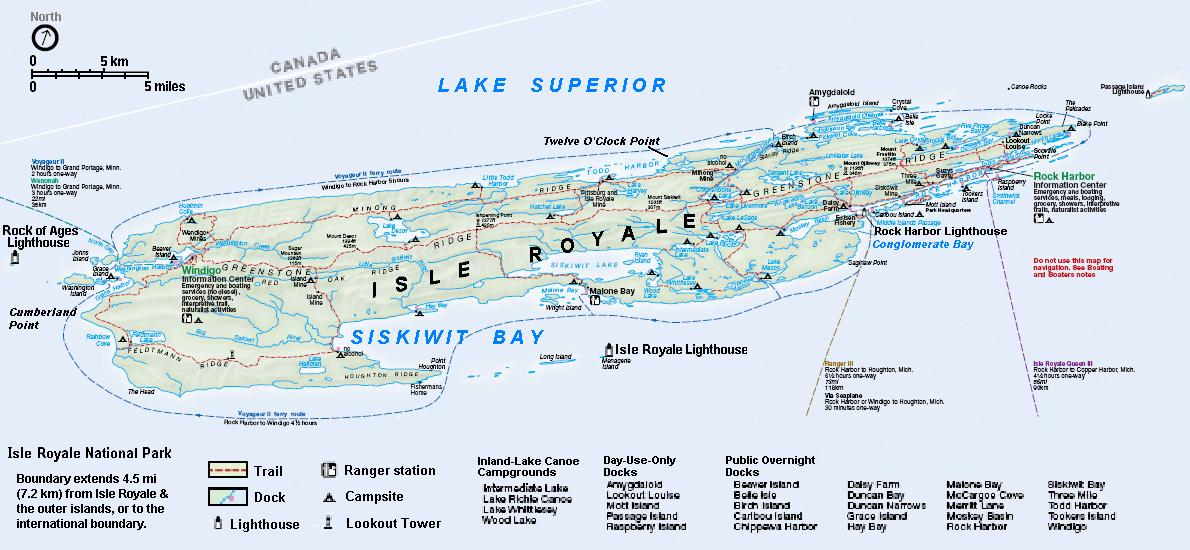
Map of Isle Royale and surrounding islands, including Amygdaloid Island (top right).

Amygdaloid Island is an island in Lake Superior off the northwestern shore of Isle Royale. It is within the boundary of Isle Royale National Park, a national park located within the U.S. state of Michigan. The island is protected and patrolled by a seasonal ranger station operated by the U.S. National Park Service.

== Geography ==
Amygdaloid Island is approximately 3.8 miles (6 km) long but no more than 0.25 miles (0.4 km) wide. Like the rest of the Isle Royale archipelago, the island is an ancient ridge of basalt oriented from the southwest to the northeast.

Amygdaloid Island is separated by Amygdaloid Channel from Isle Royale. It had relatively low visitation until the 1990s, when the growth of sea kayaking made it possible for human-powered visitors to approach the island. The waters of Lake Superior around Amygdaloid Island are notoriously dangerous, and inexperienced kayakers are not encouraged to navigate them.

== Geology ==
The island is the site of the Amygdaloid Island Flow, a deposit of basaltic lava with silica inclusions. After the lava cooled, the inclusions hardened into pink agate specimens. The agates of Amygdaloid Island are characteristically almond-shaped or amygdaloidal, hence the name Amygdaloid.

Feature	Details
Location	Lake Superior, NE Isle Royale, Michigan
Area	~0.95 sq mi (2.5 km²)
Size	~6 km long by 0.4 km wide
Geology	Amygdaloid Island Flow (basalt), amygdaloidal agates
Natural Features	Wave-cut sea arch, basalt ridges & valleys
Access	By boat/kayak only; ranger station, no camping

== See also ==
- List of islands in Isle Royale National Park
