= Neebish Island =

Island in Michigan, US

Native name: Aniibiish (Ojibwe)
- Location within Michigan

Geography
- Location: St. Marys River
- Coordinates: 46°16′14.8″N 84°09′16.5″W
- Total islands: 2
- Major islands: Big Neebish, Little Neebish
- Area: 21.5 sq mi (56 km^{2})
- Highest elevation: 571 ft (174 m)

Administration
- United States
- State: Michigan
- County: Chippewa
- Township: Soo

Demographics
- Population: 89 (2010)
- Pop. density: 4.14/sq mi (1.598/km^{2})

Neebish Island is located in the U.S. state of Michigan, in the St. Marys River, which connects Lake Superior and Lake Huron at the easternmost point of Michigan's upper peninsula.

Located west of the international border that separates the United States from the Canadian province of Ontario, the island is within the Great Lakes-St. Lawrence seaway. Ship traffic heading up to Lake Superior pass on the island's east side, while downriver traffic to Lake Huron passes through a deepened channel on the island's west side.

The island has a permanent resident population of nearly 90. It is a tourist destination for seasonal cottagers and campers.

== History ==
By the time the first Europeans arrived in the early 1600s, the area around Neebish was occupied by such historic and existing tribes as the Ojibwe, Odawa and Potawatomi, all Algonquian-speaking peoples. Their Algonkian ancestors had migrated gradually from the Atlantic coastal areas to the Great Lakes around 1200.

The island is believed to have been named by European settlers from the Ojibwe word aniibiish, meaning "leaf".

Following the Anglo-American War of 1812, British and American negotiators agreed to settle long-standing border disputes along the northern border in the Great Lakes area and elsewhere, that remained from the treaty following the American Revolutionary War. The two nations appointed commissioners to survey the boundary and determine the border between the United States and Canada as envisioned in the Treaty of Paris of 1783.

At this time, Neebish came to be known as St. Tammany Island. Anthony Barclay, the British boundary commissioner, offered the name as a compliment to the United States, as Tammany was considered the Indian saint of New Englanders. While the commission used St. Tammany Island in its maps and reports, the name change did not survive. In 1821, the commissioners of both countries consented to assign the island to the United States.

Originally, the channel between the island and the Michigan mainland was navigable only by very small craft. As a result, more of the earliest settlements developed on the east side, particularly on Little Neebish, a small island to the southeast of the main island.

In 1853, Major William Rains was among the first European settlers on Little Neebish. Rains, a British national, had earlier attempted to start a colony in the 1830s on neighbouring St. Joseph Island, part of Ontario, Canada. When this venture failed, Rains and his family moved to the southwest of that island and then to Little Neebish in the United States. For a time it was named for him, as Rains Island.

A private saw mill operated on the island near the creek between Big Neebish and Little Neebish, from 1877 to 1893. At its peak, it employed 150 men.

The island had its own telephone service, the Neebish Mutual Telephone Company, beginning in 1924. Islanders did not gain electrical power until the mid-1950s.

In 1933, a privately run car ferry began operating to provide connections between the Michigan mainland and the west side of the island. In 1980, this service was taken over by the Eastern Upper Peninsula Transportation Authority.

=== Construction of the West Neebish Channel ===
The completion in 1855 of the first ship canal and locks at Sault Ste. Marie (later known as the Soo Locks) enabled much larger ships to ply the St. Marys River. To accommodate them and to ease navigation, the American government dredged and dynamited limestone from the Munuscong Channel between Neebish and St. Joseph islands in 1856 and 1905.

The absence of any alternate route resulted in both upbound and downbound traffic on the St. Marys River having to navigate the twisting narrows of the Munuscong Channel. On September 5, 1899, the steamer Douglass Houghton, downbound north of Sailors’ Encampment, collided with a barge it was towing and sank. The wreck blocked shipping for days in both directions.

The "Houghton Blockade" as the incident became known, demonstrated the need for an alternate route along the west side of Neebish. With two channels, traffic could be separated between ships travelling upriver and downriver.

In 1903 work to widen and deepen the channel between the island and the Michigan mainland began; the West Neebish Channel was opened to downriver ship traffic in 1908. In addition to deepening the channel, this work reduced the Neebish rapids that had characterized the west side of the island until that point.

== Geography ==
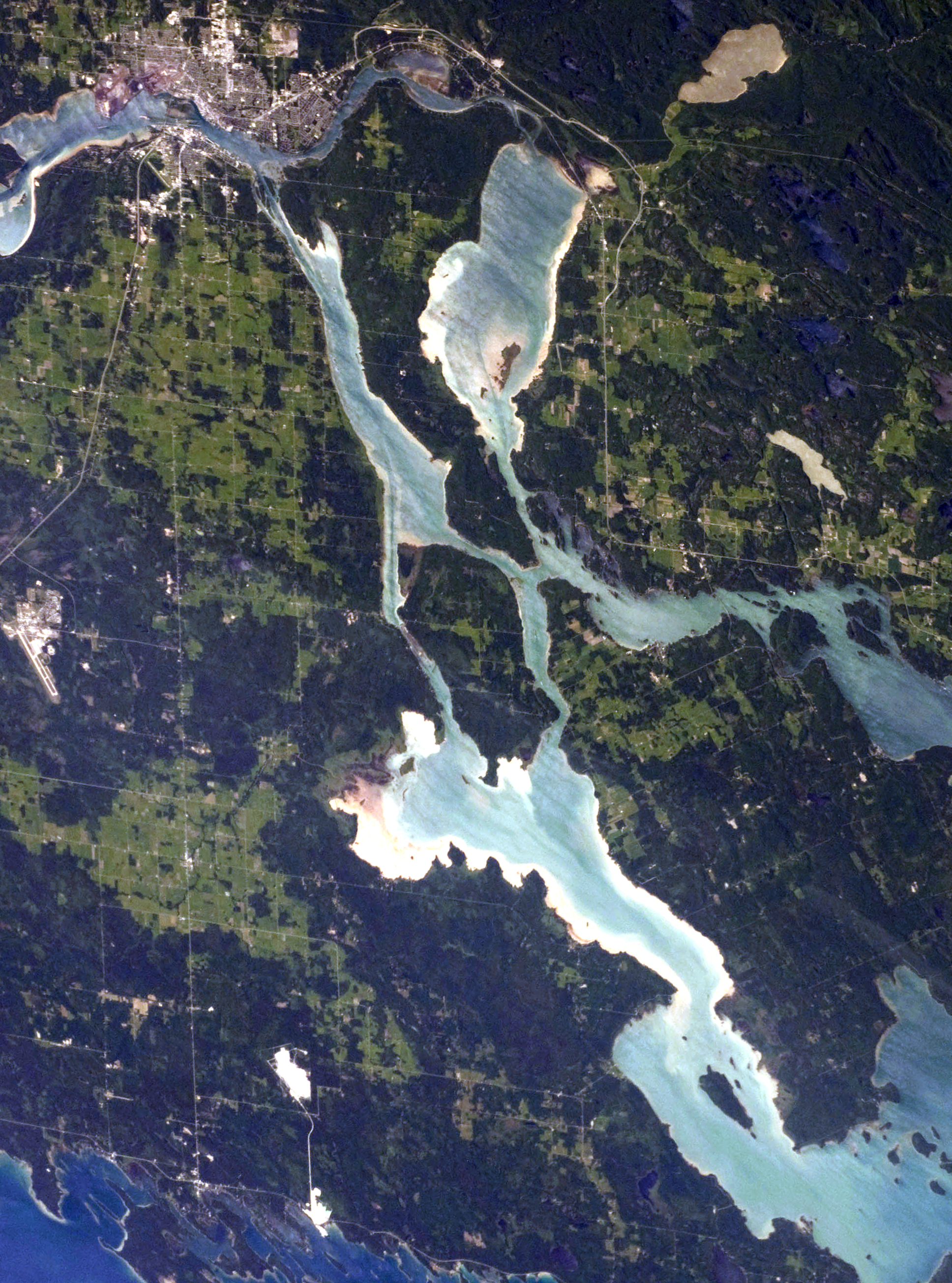
Centred is Neebish Island, Michigan. To the north is Sugar Island, Michigan. To the east is St. Joseph Island, Ontario. To the west and south is the eastern corner of Michigan's upper peninsula. The developed areas in the upper left area are the cities of Sault Ste. Marie in Ontario and Michigan.

The island of 21.5 square miles (56 km^{2}) lies south of Sugar Island and to the east of Michigan's upper peninsula.

The island consists of two parts known as "Big Neebish" and "Little Neebish." At one time the latter was also known as Rains Island. The latter, located southeast of the main island, is separated by a narrow and shallow creek known colloquially as 'the dark hole' or 'the black hole' by Neebish islanders.

Four of the 21.5 square miles (56 km^{2}) are state owned. The island is mostly undeveloped.

== Government ==
The island is the most southeasterly part of Soo Township in Michigan's Chippewa County.

Residents of the island are represented in the Michigan Legislature by the representative of the 107th District and the senator for Senate District 37. They are represented in the federal House of Representatives by the representative of Michigan's 1st congressional district.

== Transportation ==
=== Water ===
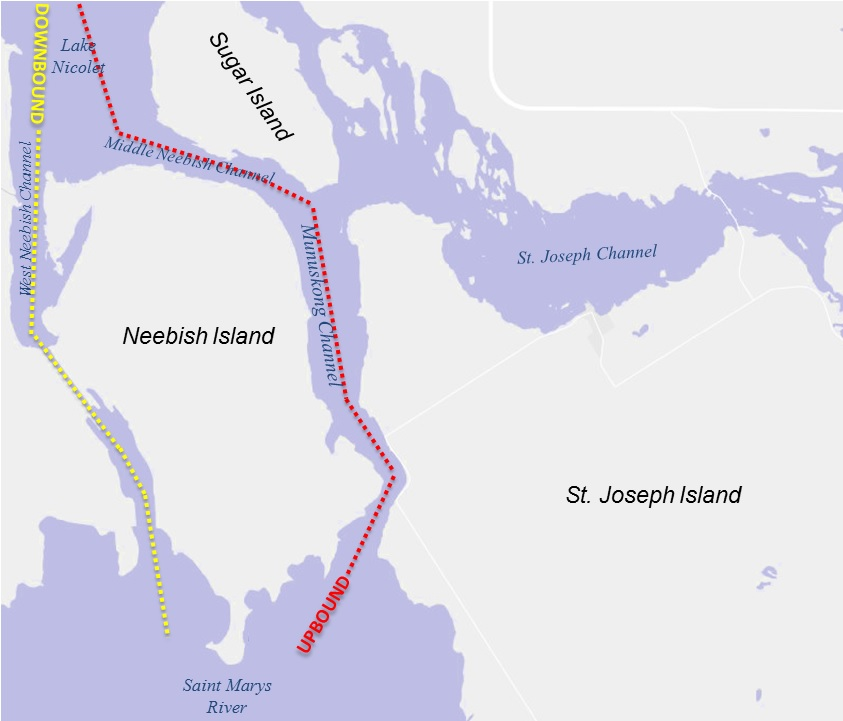
Vessels upbound on the lower St. Marys pass through the Munuskong Channel towards Lake Nicolet, while downbound vessels travel toward Lake Huron through the West Neebish Channel.

The island is accessible only by water. A vehicle and passenger ferry operates on a seasonal basis to connect the island with Bruce Township on the Michigan mainland. During the height of summer, departures occur every two hours, with some additional trips scheduled during peak morning and afternoon hours. Service is not provided between January 15 and April 1. In 2006, the ferry carried an average of 3,300 passengers with 2,175 vehicles each month.

The ferry is owned, maintained, and fueled by the Eastern Upper Peninsula Transportation Authority; it is operated under contract by a private firm.

The island forms an important junction of the Great Lakes-St. Lawrence seaway. Ship traffic heading up-bound on the St. Marys River toward Lake Superior passes through the Munuscong Channel on the island's east side, while down-bound traffic to Lake Huron passes through the deepened West Neebish Channel on the island's west side.

=== Road ===
Brander Road runs the north–south length of the island nearly at its center. East 15 Mile Road runs across the east–west axis of the island; it is an unconnected extension of the road of the same name in Bruce Township. The ferry serves a road called East Neebish Ferry Road on both the mainland and the island.

== Culture ==
The island had many one-room school houses earlier in its history, but most are no longer in operation because of changes in population and educational expectations. A community center, next to the fire house, was built at the former site of a school house.

Numerous families have owned and maintained cottages on the island for several generations. The island is a destination for seasonal cottagers in the northeastern part of Michigan.

A small general store and resort, known as the Little Neebish Resort, burned down in the 1990s. Plans to rebuild were underway. Neebish Island Resort has opened a general store and runs it on a seasonal basis. Another general store opened by the original ferry dock. It was owned and operated by Charlotte Laitinen, but closed in the early 21st century.

Neebish Island was the birthplace and childhood home of Pat Norton (1931-2001), a local painter whose work depicts the St. Marys River, lake freighters, churches, and other island scenes. Born as Pat Cook, one of twelve children of the United States lighthouse keeper and his wife, she grew up with familiar views of lake freighters and related traffic. After she married Roger Norton, they lived on Neebish Island, and also in Sault Ste. Marie and Barbeau, Michigan; and Wisconsin. She specialized in watercolor paintings.

Pine River Camp, a canoe camp that attracted young people from across the United States, operated on Neebish Island for nearly 30 years from the late 1960s until it closed in 1993. The rustic camp had basic cabins; the dining hall was a pavilion with log poles and a dirt floor. Next to it was a camp fire where the meals were cooked.

=== Popular culture ===
In the film The Switch (2010), starring Jennifer Aniston and Jason Bateman, Neebish Island is referred to as the site of the cabin of parents of Roland Nilson (played by Patrick Wilson).

== See also ==
- Populated islands of the Great Lakes

== Other reading ==
- Edward T. Cook. Guiding the Way from Middle Neebish., Bookstand Publishing (February 2007) (self-published, not valid as Reliable Source about artist Pat Norton.)
