= Sugar Island (Michigan) =

Island in Michigan, U.S.

- Location within Michigan

Geography
- Location: St. Marys River
- Coordinates: 46°26′N 84°13′W
- Area: 49.44 sq mi (128.0 km^{2})

Administration
- United States
- State: Michigan
- County: Chippewa County
- Township: Sugar Island Township

Demographics
- Population: 683 (2000)
- Pop. density: 13.8/sq mi (5.33/km^{2})

Sugar Island is an island in the U.S. state of Michigan in the St. Marys River between the United States and the Canadian province of Ontario. The entire island constitutes Sugar Island Township in Chippewa County at the eastern tip of the Upper Peninsula. According to the 2000 census there were 683 people living on a land area of 128 square kilometers (49 square miles); about 14 people per square mile.

== Background ==
The island lies between Lake George and Lake Nicolet, and to the north of Neebish Island and St. Joseph Island. Pine Island is just east of its southern tip. Vehicle access to the island is via a ferry service at its northwestern tip, connecting east of Sault Ste. Marie, Michigan.

The island was part of the Canada–United States border dispute settled by the Webster–Ashburton Treaty, and affirmed to be part of the United States when the treaty was signed on August 9, 1842.

In 1945 Sugar Island was nominated as a possible location for the headquarters of the United Nations.

The island has large undeveloped areas, and both the Bay Mills Indian Community and the Sault Tribe of Chippewa Indians have interests on the island. The Sault Tribe consider it to be part of their ancestral homelands.

The University of Michigan Biological Station operates the Chase Osborn Preserve, a 3,200-acre (13-square-kilometer) tract near the southern tip of the island. The Preserve is named for Chase Osborn, an island resident who had been the governor of Michigan.

== Prominent residents ==
- Chase Osborn, Governor of Michigan (1911-1913)

== See also ==
- Populated islands of the Great Lakes
