= Au Train Island =

Island in Alger County, Michigan

- Location within Michigan Location within the United States

Geography
- Location: Alger County, Michigan
- Coordinates: 46°29′07″N 86°53′36″W
- Area: 107 acres (43 ha)
- Highest elevation: 679 ft (207 m)

Administration
- United States
- State: Michigan
- County: Alger County
- Township: Au Train Township

Au Train Island is an island off the southern shore of Lake Superior. The island is located in Au Train Township, Alger County, Michigan. The island lies a little over a mile from the Upper Peninsula shoreline, adjacent to the community of Rock River. The island is off access to the public and is privately owned.
