= Millman Island =

Island in Michigan

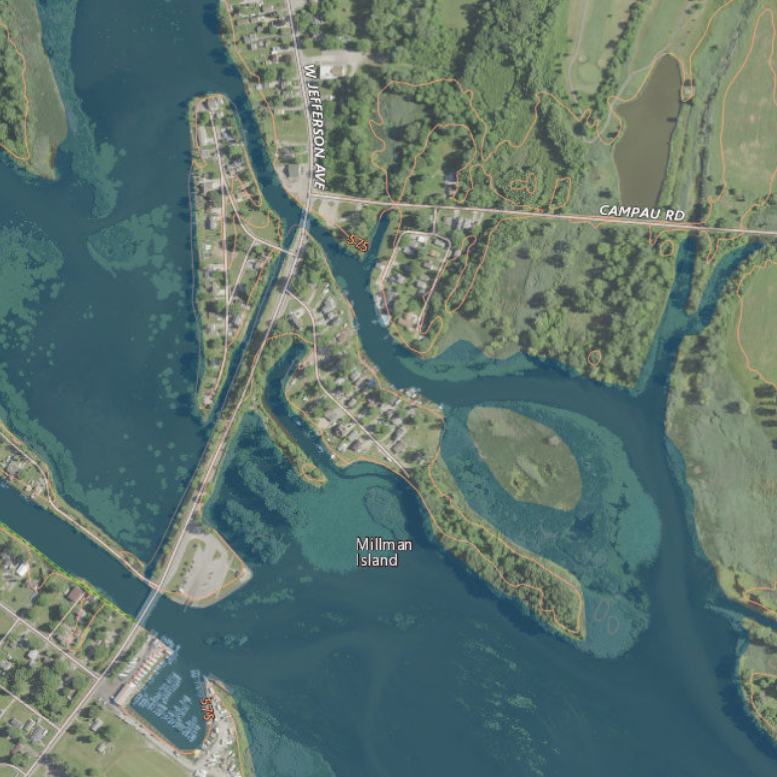
- USGS aerial imagery of Millman Island

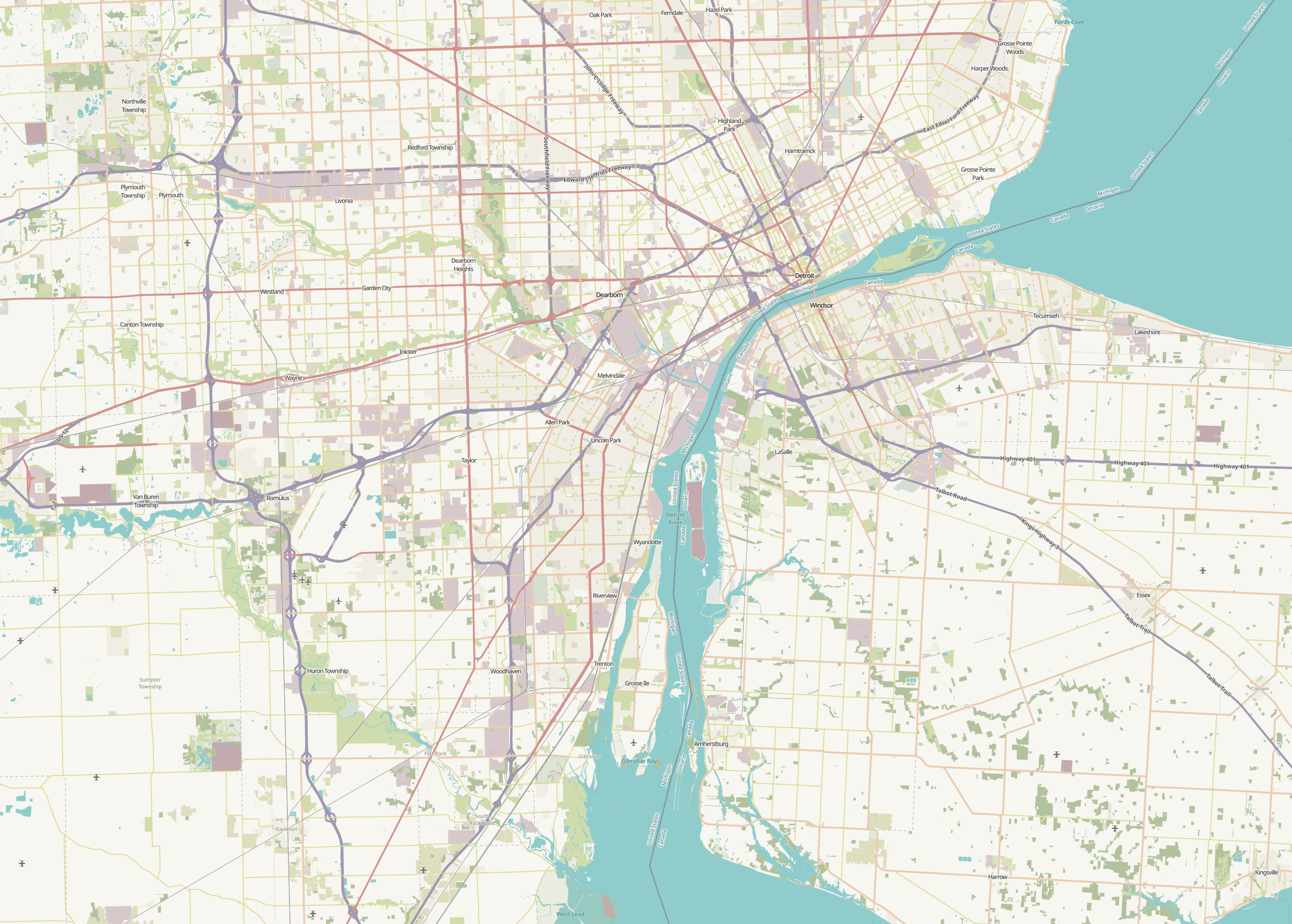
- Location within Wayne County, Michigan Location within Michigan Location within the United States

Geography
- Location: Southeast Michigan
- Coordinates: 42°02′35″N 83°12′38″W
- Adjacent to: Huron River
- Highest elevation: 571 ft (174 m)

Administration
- United States
- State: Michigan
- County: Wayne

Millman Island is an island in the Huron River, near Lake Erie, in Wayne County, Michigan. Its coordinates are 42°02′35″N 83°12′38″W; the United States Geological Survey gave its elevation as 571 ft (174 m). It is shown (unlabeled, as a peninsula) on an 1818 survey map, and labeled "Millman Island" on a 1936 map.
