= Soo Township, Michigan =

- Civil township
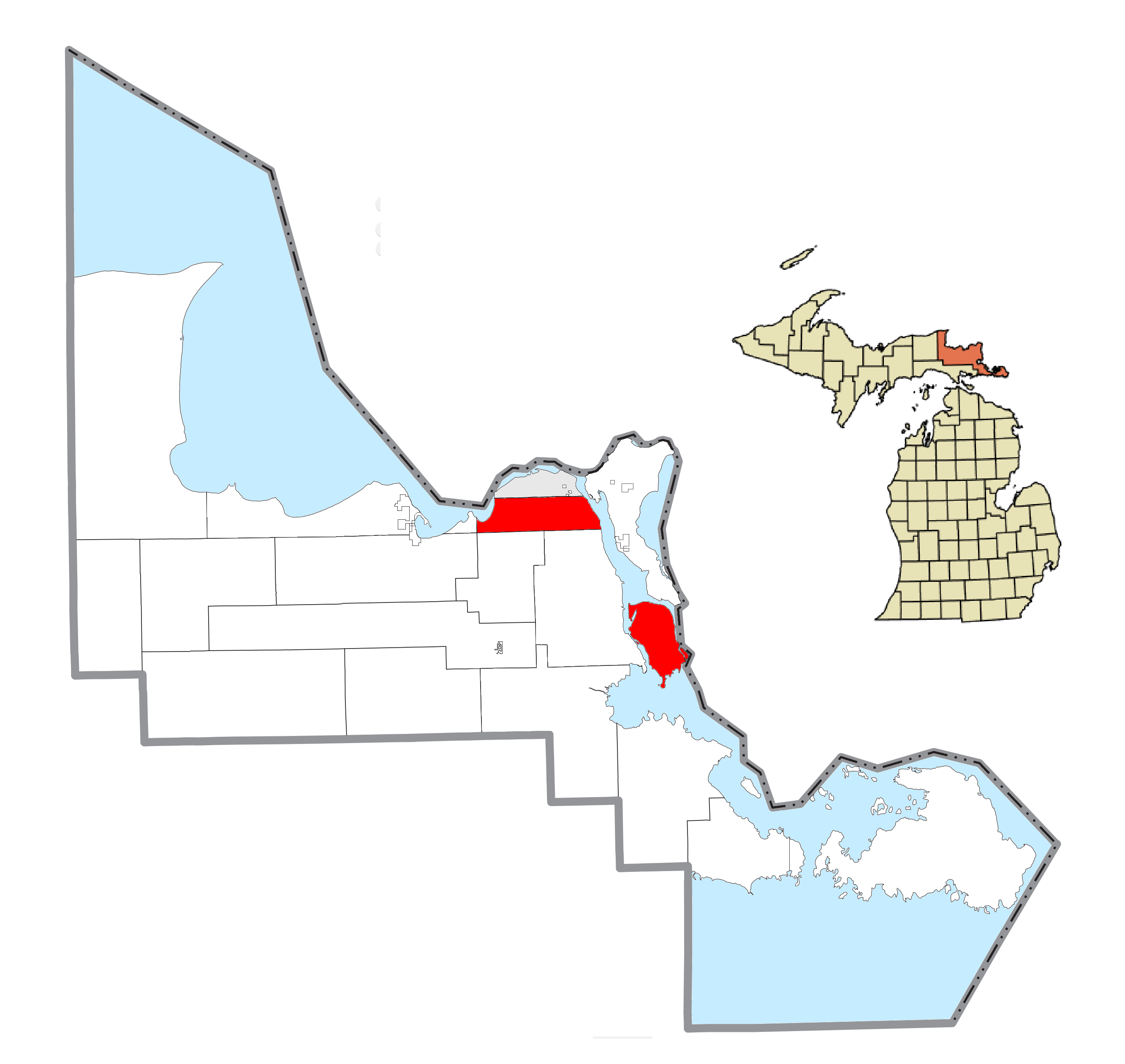
- Location within Chippewa County

- Location within the state of Michigan
- Coordinates: 46°25′11″N 84°18′40″W
- Country: United States
- State: Michigan
- County: Chippewa

Government
  - Supervisor: Larry Perron

Area
  - Total: 67.9 sq mi (175.9 km^{2})
  - Land: 50.1 sq mi (129.8 km^{2})
  - Water: 17.8 sq mi (46.1 km^{2})
- Elevation: 581 ft (177 m)

Population (2020)
  - Total: 2,966
  - Density: 59.18/sq mi (22.85/km^{2})
- Time zone: Eastern
- ZIP code(s): 49710 (Barbeau); 49783 (Sault Ste. Marie)
- Area code: 906
- FIPS code: 26-74620
- GNIS feature ID: 1627091
- Website: Official website

Soo Township is a civil township of Chippewa County in the U.S. state of Michigan. The population was 2,966 at the 2020 census.

== Geography ==
Soo Township consists of two sections in northeastern Chippewa County, connected by a stretch of the St. Marys River. The northwestern section is part of the Upper Peninsula of Michigan and is bordered to the north by the city of Sault Ste. Marie. It extends west into Izaak Walton Bay on the St. Marys River (upstream from Sault Ste. Marie) and east as far as the Little Rapids Channel of the river (downstream from Sault Ste. Marie). The southeastern portion of the township, about 43% of the township's total territory, comprises Neebish Island, 9 miles (14 km) downriver from the rest of the township.

According to the US Census Bureau, the township has a total area of 67.9 square miles (175.9 km^{2}), of which 50.1 square miles (129.8 km^{2}) is land and 17.8 square miles (46.1 km^{2}), or 26.20%, is water.

== Communities ==
- Neebish Island is separated from the township by waters of St. Marys River. Its hundred-odd permanent residents comprise an unincorporated community.

== Demographics ==
In 2010, the township had a population of 3,141.
