= Krakow Township, Michigan =

- Civil township
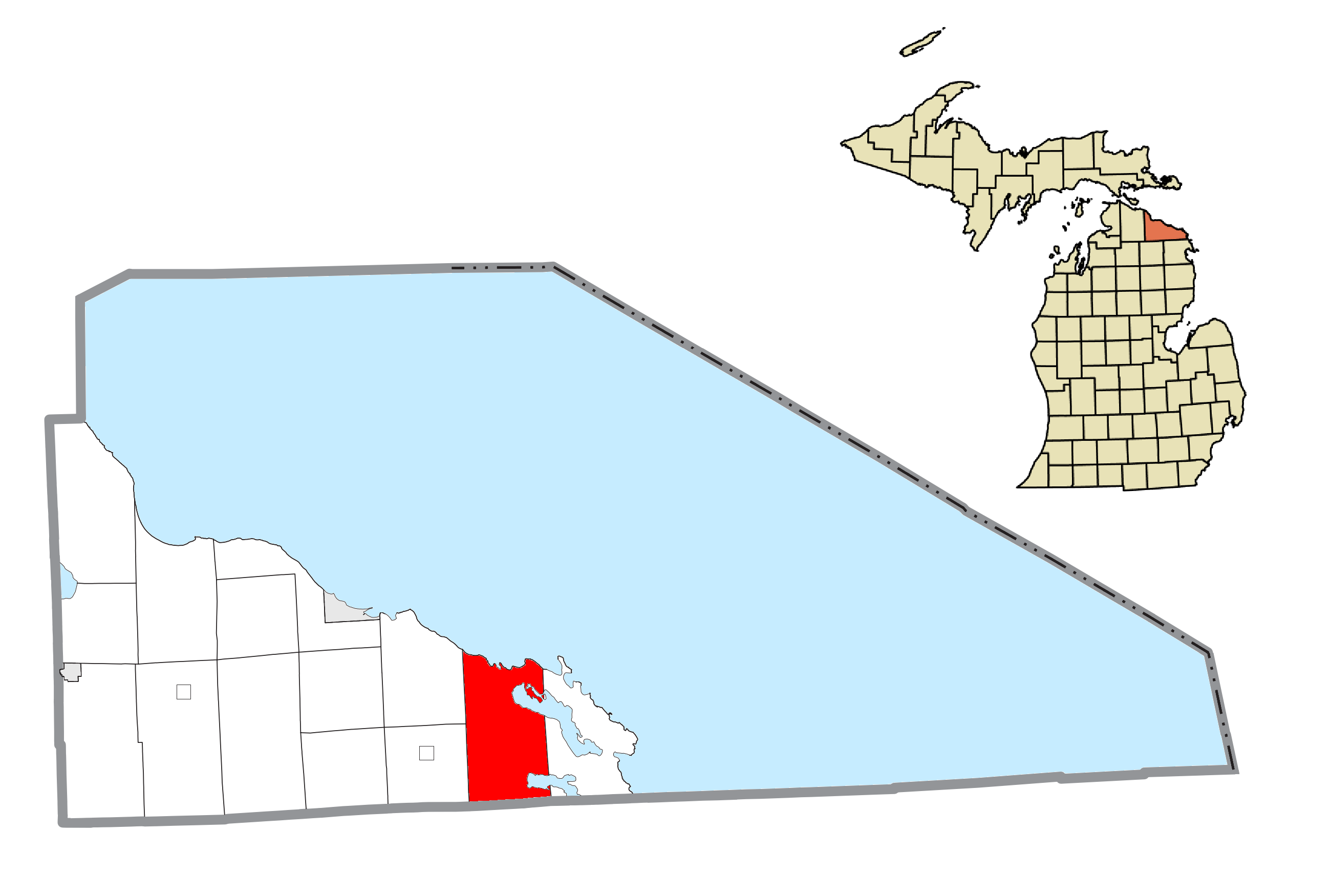
- Location within Presque Isle County

- Location within the state of Michigan Krakow Township (the United States)
- Coordinates: 45°16′21″N 83°33′31″W
- Country: United States
- State: Michigan
- County: Presque Isle

Government
  - Supervisor: Michael Grohowski

Area
  - Total: 60.8 sq mi (157.4 km^{2})
  - Land: 55.8 sq mi (144.5 km^{2})
  - Water: 5.0 sq mi (12.9 km^{2})
- Elevation: 617 ft (188 m)

Population (2020)
  - Total: 666
  - Density: 11.9/sq mi (4.61/km^{2})
- Time zone: UTC-5 (Eastern (EST))
  - Summer (DST): UTC-4 (EDT)
- ZIP code(s): 49776, 49777
- Area code: 989
- FIPS code: 26-43900
- GNIS feature ID: 1625140
- Website: Official website

Krakow Township is a civil township of Presque Isle County in the U.S. state of Michigan. The population was 666 at the 2020 census. It was named after the Polish city of Kraków, a historical capital of Poland and seat of Polish monarchs.

== Communities ==
Leroy is a small unincorporated community within the township.

== Geography ==
According to the United States Census Bureau, the township has a total area of 60.8 square miles (157 km^{2}), of which 55.8 square miles (145 km^{2}) is land and 5.0 square miles (13 km^{2}) (8.18%) is water.

== Demographics ==
As of the census of 2000, there were 622 people, 293 households, and 201 families residing in the township. The population density was 11.1 inhabitants per square mile (4.3/km^{2}). There were 750 housing units at an average density of 13.4 per square mile (5.2/km^{2}). The racial makeup of the township was 99.36% White, 0.48% Native American, and 0.16% from two or more races. Hispanic or Latino of any race were 0.16% of the population.

There were 293 households, out of which 15.7% had children under the age of 18 living with them, 63.1% were married couples living together, 3.8% had a female householder with no husband present, and 31.1% were non-families. 29.0% of all households were made up of individuals, and 16.0% had someone living alone who was 65 years of age or older. The average household size was 2.12 and the average family size was 2.56.

In the township the population was spread out, with 15.0% under the age of 18, 5.1% from 18 to 24, 19.3% from 25 to 44, 30.4% from 45 to 64, and 30.2% who were 65 years of age or older. The median age was 50 years. For every 100 females, there were 108.0 males. For every 100 females age 18 and over, there were 109.9 males.

The median income for a household in the township was $31,111, and the median income for a family was $39,125. Males had a median income of $40,962 versus $25,893 for females. The per capita income for the township was $20,979. About 4.0% of families and 6.9% of the population were below the poverty line, including 8.8% of those under age 18 and 5.8% of those age 65 or over.
