= Goguac Lake =

Lake in the state of Michigan, United States

- Location within Michigan
- Location: Calhoun County, Michigan
- Coordinates: 42°17′30″N 85°12′30″W
- Basin countries: United States
- Surface area: 352 acres (1 km^{2})
- Max. depth: 66 ft (20 m)
- Surface elevation: 912 ft (278 m)
- Islands: 3
- Settlements: Battle Creek

Goguac Lake is a 352-acre (1.42 km^{2}) lake in the city of Battle Creek, located in Calhoun County in the southwest portion of the U.S. state of Michigan. With a maximum depth of 66 feet (20 m), the lake is home to many fish species, including Crappie, Bluegill, Pike, Largemouth Bass, Yellow Perch, Rock Bass and Walleye.

While the perimeter of the lake consists primarily of private residences and expansive estates; the Battle Creek Country Club and Willard Beach public park can be found on the lake.

A fictional version of the lake was featured in the television show Battle Creek

== Islands ==
There are three islands on Goguac Lake. Picnic Island, farthest south, became Chamberlain's, then Elk's and finally Vince's Island. Dr. Vince, the English-born dentist, built a causeway from the shore so that he could drive to the handsome manor house he built there. Peach Island was so named for the peach orchard planted there by Hermes Sweet. It was sometimes used for cockfights because both the sport and betting were against the law and this was a good hideaway from the sheriff. The island was subsequently known as Hulbert's, then Clark's, then Gould's for the owners of the single cottage. Ward's Island is smaller than in the early days when the lake level was lower. Ward's cottage stood on it several decades, as did the first Goguac Boat Club for about three years. Occasional picnickers use it now as trespassers, although those who recognize poison ivy generally stay away. Before its graceful elms died it became quite a bird sanctuary. Hummingbirds that fed in gardens on the mainland nested there.

== History ==
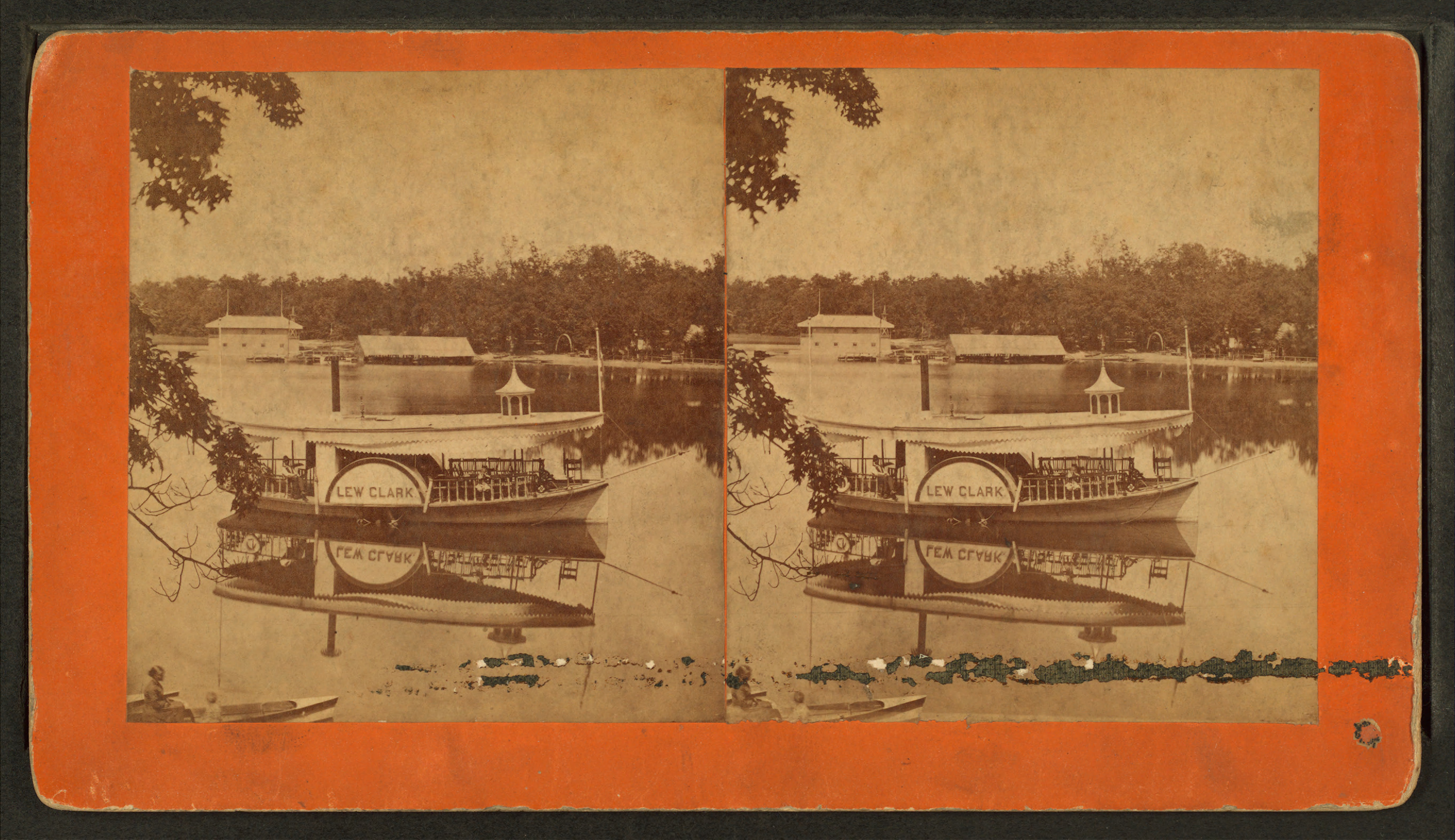
Stereoscopic view (prior 1879)

The lake was originally spelled Coguagiack, a Native American term referring to the "undulating" prairie surrounding the lake. This was an area that was home for the Potawatomi tribe and Goguac Lake was said to be a gathering place for them from time to time.

Since being settled by the English in the early nineteenth century, Goguac Lake has provided irrigation for crops, a ready supply of water and a focal point for community recreation.

== Liberty Amusement Park ==
Like many lakes throughout the early 20th Century, Goguac Lake was once home to a small amusement park, called Liberty Amusement Park. It boasted a wooden roller coaster as well as a large dance hall. Construction started in the late 1890s and the park operated at least through the 1912 season.

== Tall tales ==
Goguac Lake has figured in a number of stories: from pure fiction to legends based on a thread of fact and some fantasied logic.

George Willard guessed that La Salle had camped beside Goguac Lake; the story grew to La Salle's committing himself on the beauty of this particular body of water. After slogging through swamps around hundreds of lakes in his hasty escape across southern Michigan. It is doubtful if La Salle had bothered to look at Goguac, much less to comment on its superiority. Of course he had to sleep someplace, Willard figured, so why not beside this lake? Willard also thought the name Goguac meant Ancient Fort and was given to the lake by the Indians. A mound of earth that cut across Waupakisco peninsula was designated Ancient Fort on early maps. Indians seldom gave names to bodies of water and we now know that it was the prairie that was 'undulating' — the meaning of the Indian word Coghwagiak.

The larger bay, in one place 66 feet (20 m) deep, is spring fed, but any number of stories arose as to the cause of cold and warm water only a few feet apart. In the 1890s a few cottagers stocked the lake with fish of desirable kinds for eating and one year brought in some choice eels. That started stories comparable to those told about the Loch Ness Monster. But the stories disappeared as did the eels. Only one catch, harmless enough, has been reported in the last quarter century.

In 1851 the New York Mercury, a journal which sired the dime novel and our modern mystery magazines, published a story whose setting was an island in Goguac Lake. The story was retold and republished several times and has been called "The Soul of Stephen Strand." The author is unknown. Its main character was a two personality man. He didn't have two personalities to begin with, like the later Dr. Jekyll and Mr. Hyde, but had stolen the 'soul' and appearance of a man dying here and placed them in his own sturdy body. The story included plenty of suspense and a spooky cat.

Goguac Lake has no known natural outlets and its level changes according to season, going down during dry spells, coming up when there is much rain. An artificial inlet from Minges Brook controls this somewhat. Following a rumor that the lake has a hidden outlet into the Kalamazoo River, a priceless 'first person' story was written for a local paper. Suspected as author of the story, and perhaps of the rumor, is William Pease who was owner, editor and possibly sole writer for The Jeffersonian, a short-lived newspaper in Battle Creek.

The autobiographical bit told that the author was a visitor, living at the Battle Creek House, and that he was swimming in Goguac Lake when he was sucked into the outlet at the bottom of the lake. he was swept all the way to the Kalamazoo River. Badly bruised but uninjured, he was not only able to walk but to run back to the hotel and sneak unobserved in the back way. His suit was shamefully torn. Just how he breathed all of that time in a tunnel of water he did not bother to explain.

== See also ==
- List of lakes in Michigan
