= Hill Township, Michigan =

- Civil township
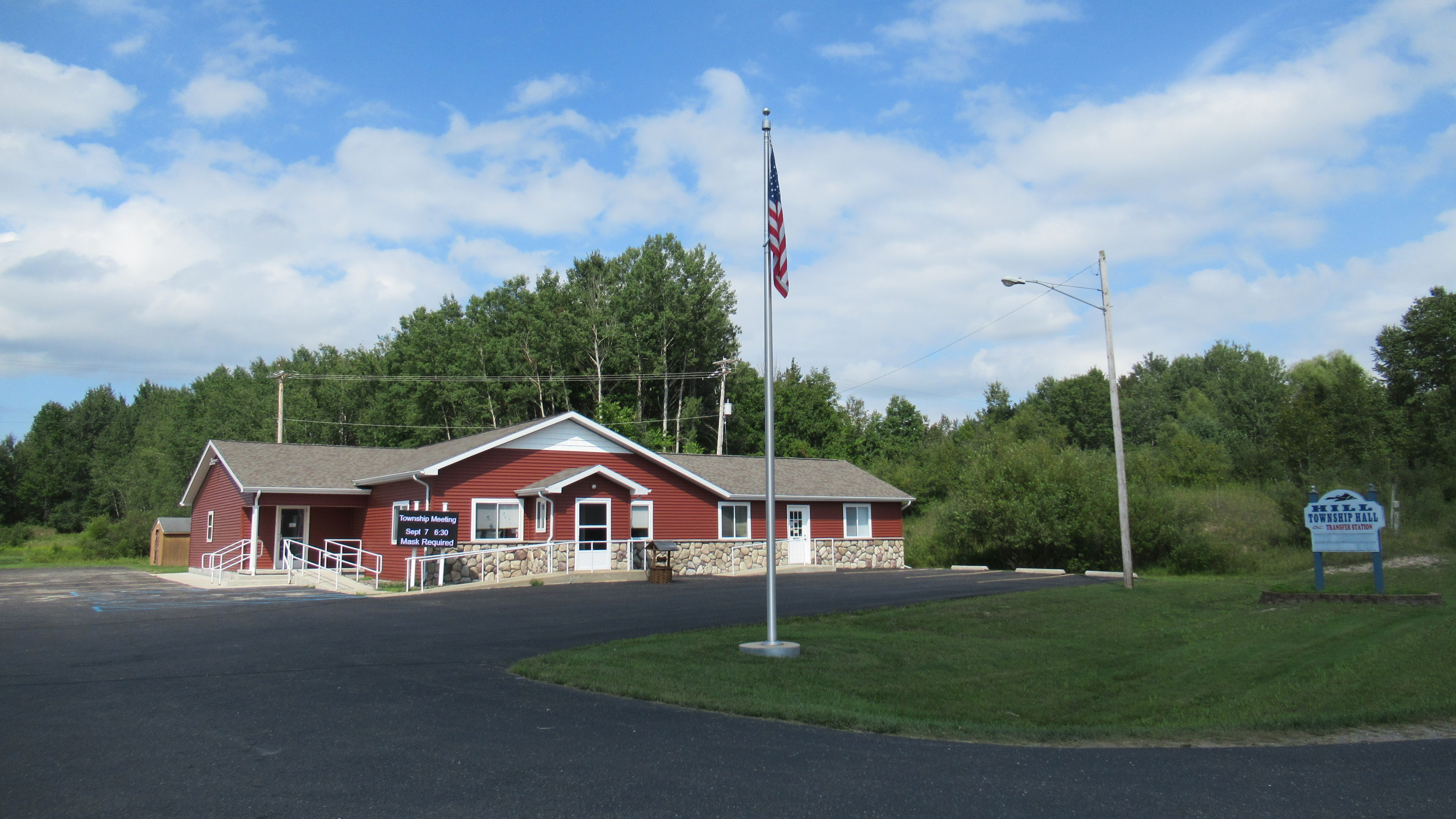
- Hill Township Hall

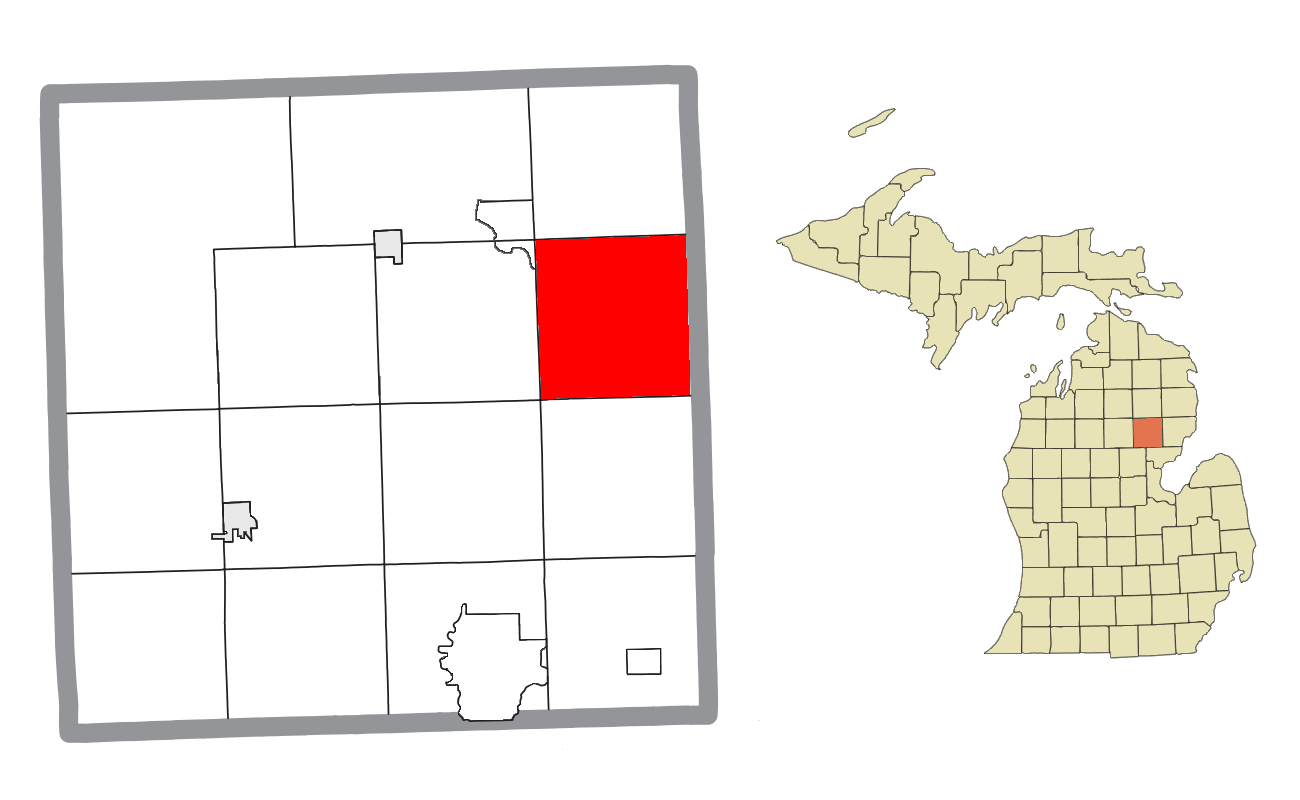
- Location within Ogemaw County

- Location within the state of Michigan Location within the United States
- Coordinates: 44°22′40″N 83°57′17″W
- Country: United States
- State: Michigan
- County: Ogemaw

Government
  - Supervisor: Robert Reid
  - Clerk: Carol Gillman

Area
  - Total: 36.11 sq mi (93.52 km^{2})
  - Land: 32.54 sq mi (84.28 km^{2})
  - Water: 3.57 sq mi (9.25 km^{2})
- Elevation: 850 ft (260 m)

Population (2020)
  - Total: 1,251
  - Density: 38.44/sq mi (14.84/km^{2})
- Time zone: UTC-5 (Eastern (EST))
  - Summer (DST): UTC-4 (EDT)
- ZIP code(s): 48635 (Lupton); 48739 (Hale)
- Area code: 989
- FIPS code: 26-38300
- GNIS feature ID: 1626472
- Website: https://www.hilltownshiphall.com/

Hill Township is a civil township of Ogemaw County in the U.S. state of Michigan. The population was 1,251 at the 2020 census.

== Communities ==
- Shady Shores is an unincorporated community in the northwest portion of the township at 44°24′23″N 83°58′28″W between Rifle Lake to the north and George Lake to the south.

== Geography ==
According to the U.S. Census Bureau, the township has a total area of 36.11 square miles (93.52 km^{2}), of which 32.54 square miles (84.28 km^{2}) is land and 3.57 square miles (9.25 km^{2}) (9.89%) is water.

== Demographics ==
As of the census of 2000, there were 1,584 people, 742 households, and 503 families residing in the township. The population density was 48.5 inhabitants per square mile (18.7/km^{2}). There were 2,113 housing units at an average density of 64.6 per square mile (24.9/km^{2}). The racial makeup of the township was 97.47% White, 0.88% Native American, 0.44% Asian, 0.13% from other races, and 1.07% from two or more races. Hispanic or Latino of any race were 1.07% of the population.

There were 742 households, out of which 15.2% had children under the age of 18 living with them, 59.0% were married couples living together, 5.5% had a female householder with no husband present, and 32.1% were non-families. 27.8% of all households were made up of individuals, and 16.7% had someone living alone who was 65 years of age or older. The average household size was 2.13 and the average family size was 2.53.

In the township the population was spread out, with 15.3% under the age of 18, 4.1% from 18 to 24, 17.9% from 25 to 44, 35.0% from 45 to 64, and 27.7% who were 65 years of age or older. The median age was 54 years. For every 100 females, there were 99.5 males. For every 100 females age 18 and over, there were 98.2 males.

The median income for a household in the township was $29,821, and the median income for a family was $34,375. Males had a median income of $31,250 versus $25,000 for females. The per capita income for the township was $18,770. About 11.9% of families and 13.4% of the population were below the poverty line, including 19.4% of those under age 18 and 10.2% of those age 65 or over.
