= Iroquois Island =

Island in Chippewa County, Michigan, United States

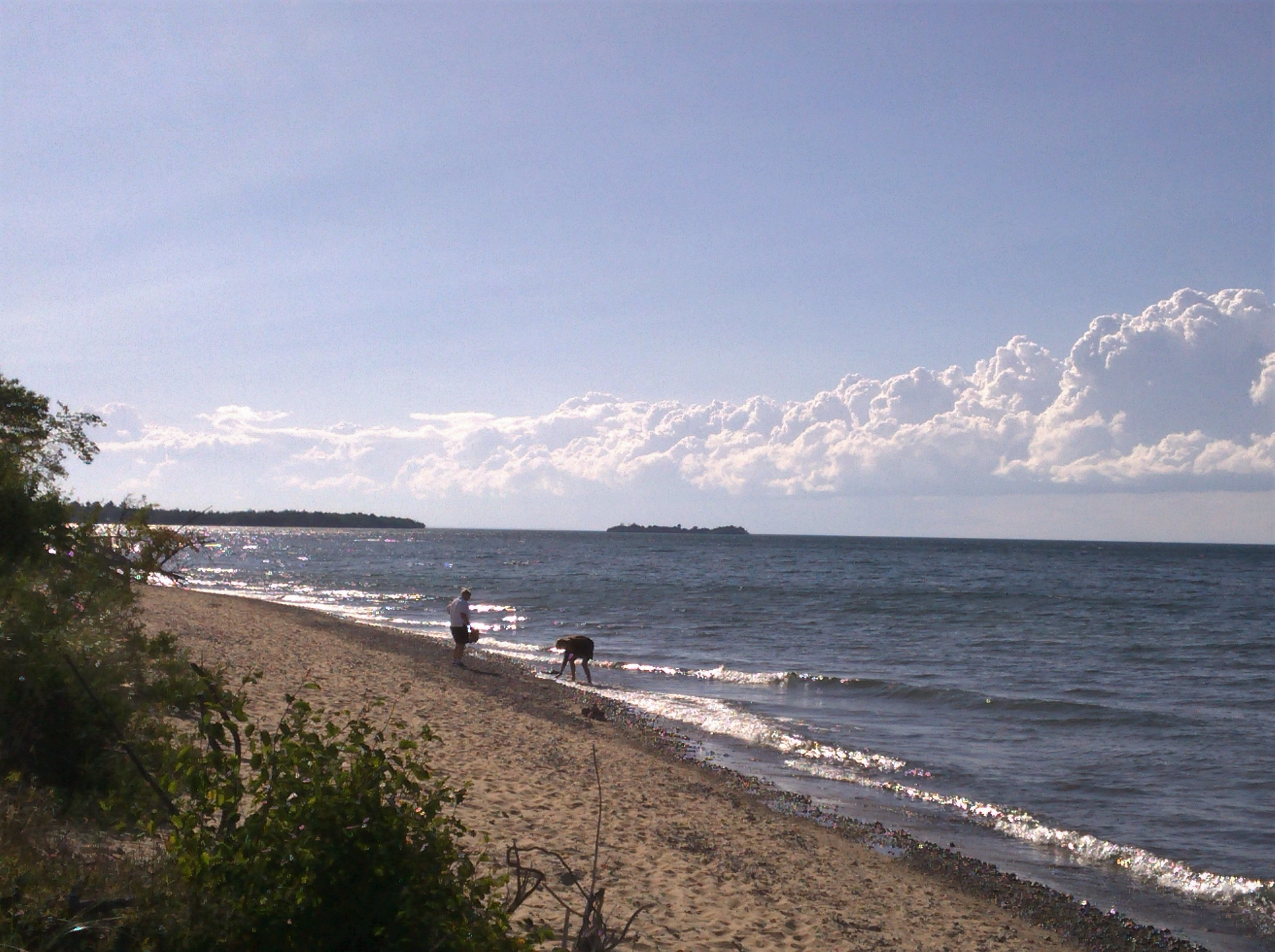
- The island beach

- Location within Michigan Location within the United States

Geography
- Location: Chippewa County, Michigan
- Coordinates: 46°29′30″N 84°40′57″W
- Area: 6 acres (2.4 ha)
- Highest elevation: 607 ft (185 m)

Administration
- United States
- State: Michigan
- County: Chippewa
- Township: Bay Mills

Iroquois Island is an island off the southeast shore of Lake Superior. The island is located in Bay Mills Township, Chippewa County, Michigan. The 6 acre island is what makes up the Iroquois Island Nature Preserve.
