= Edmond Island =

Island in Michigan

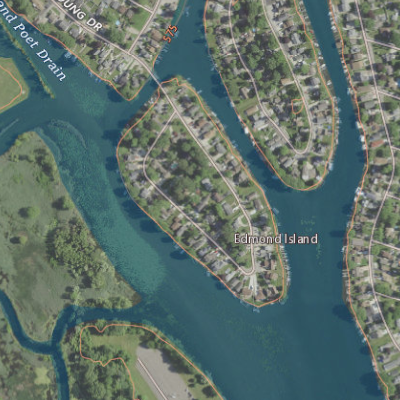
- USGS aerial imagery of Edmond Island

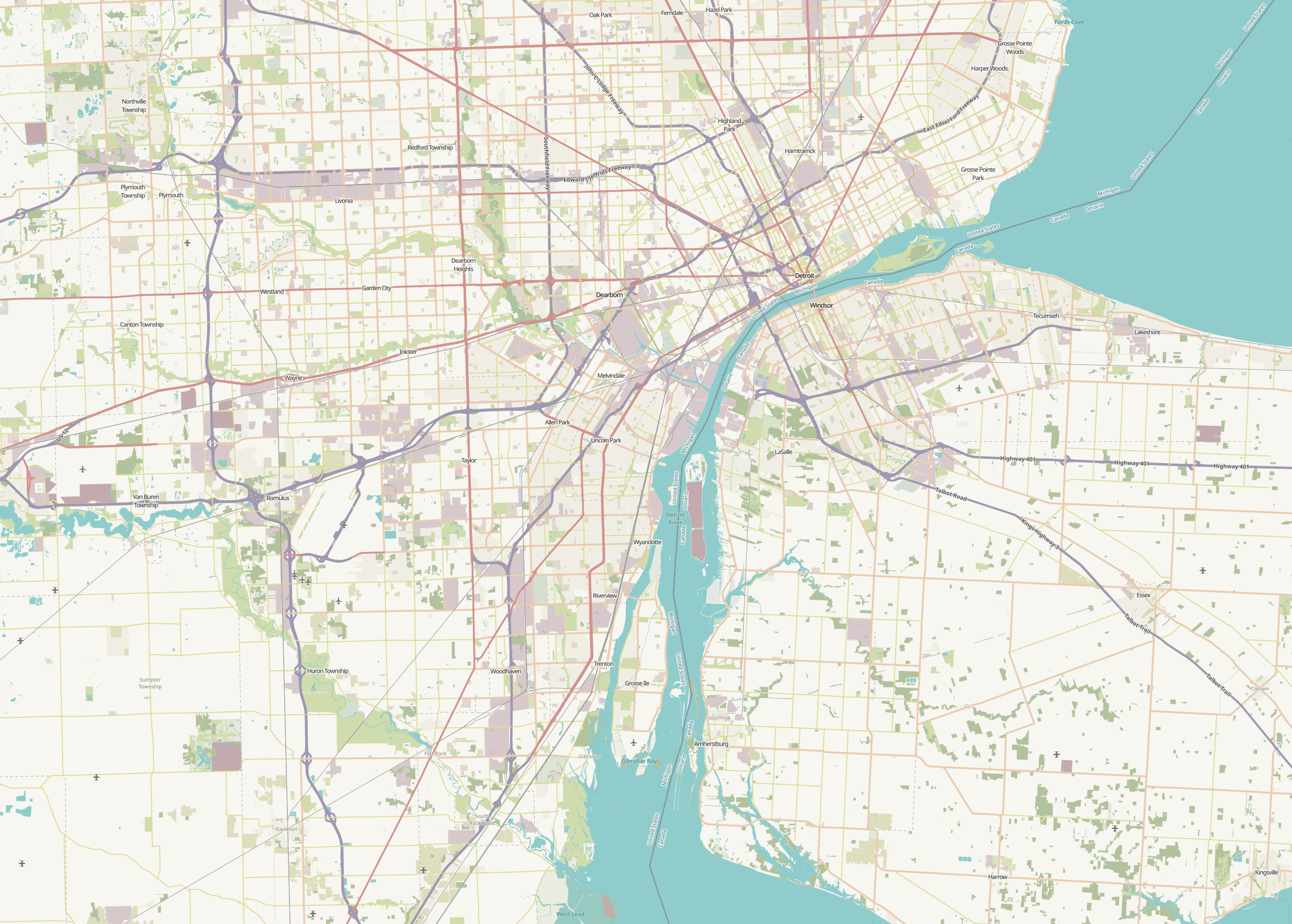
- Location within Wayne County, Michigan Location within Michigan Location within the United States

Geography
- Location: Michigan
- Coordinates: 42°04′58″N 83°11′39″W
- Highest elevation: 577 ft (175.9 m)

Administration
- United States
- State: Michigan
- County: Wayne

Edmond Island is an island in the Detroit River located in the city of Gibraltar, Michigan, in the United States. Its coordinates are 42°04′58″N 83°11′39″W, and the United States Geological Survey gives its elevation as 577 ft (176 m).
