= Sturgeon Bar =

Island in Michigan

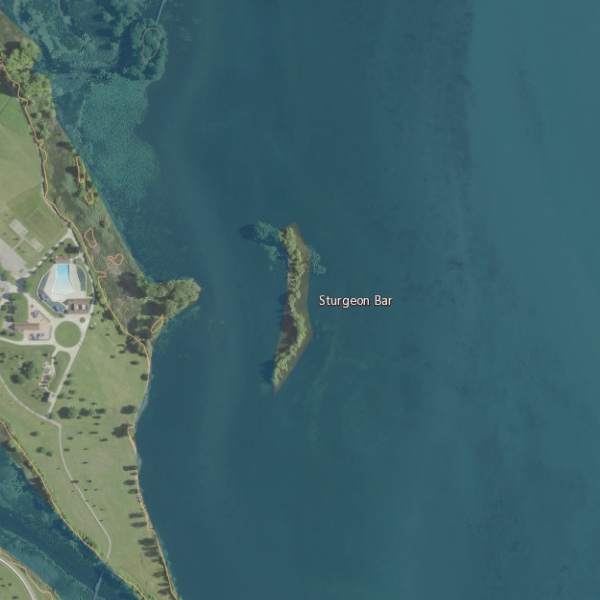
- USGS aerial imagery of Sturgeon Bar

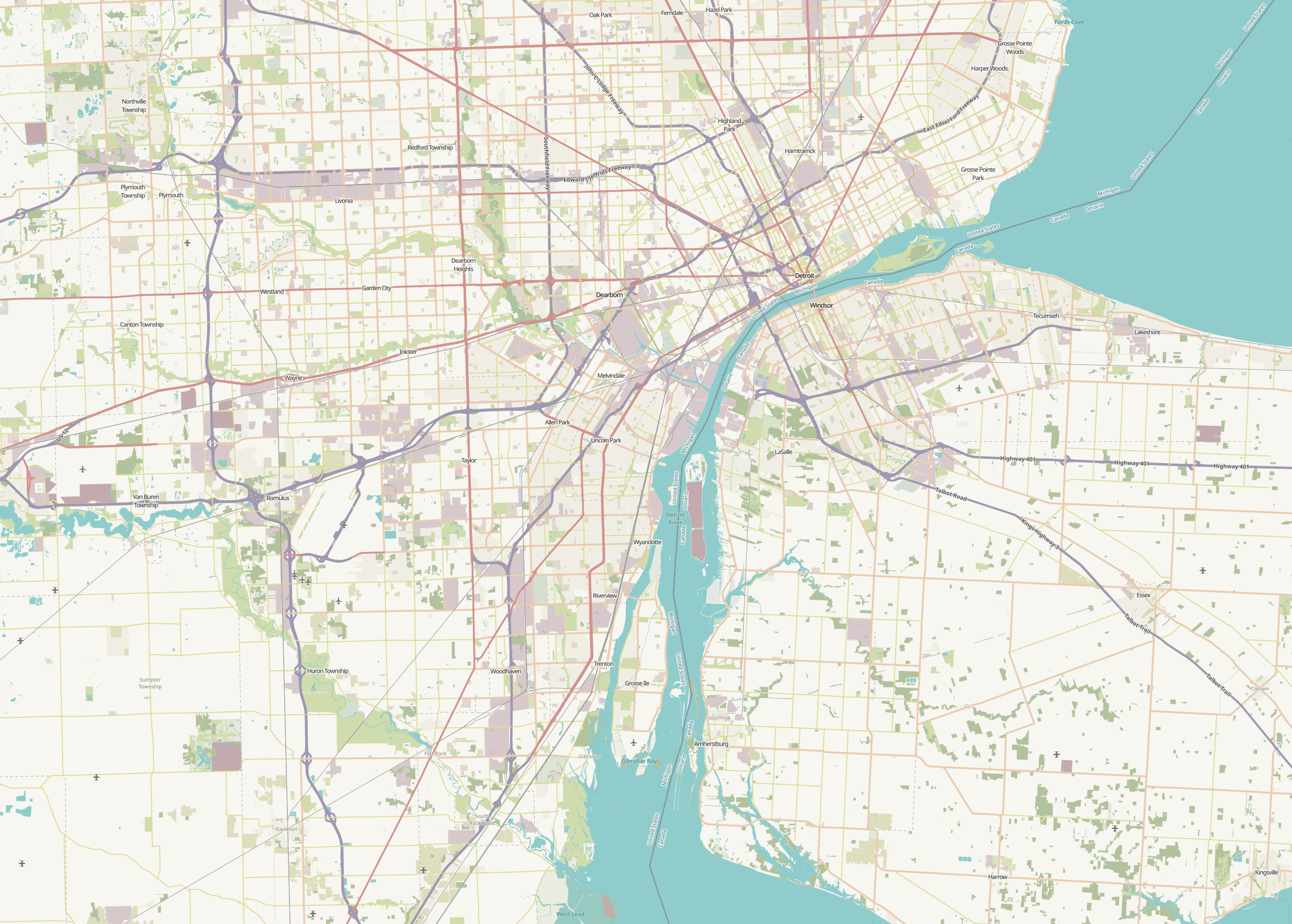
- Location within Wayne County, Michigan Location within Michigan Location within the United States

Geography
- Location: Michigan
- Coordinates: 42°04′07″N 83°11′17″W
- Highest elevation: 571 ft (174 m)

Administration
- United States
- State: Michigan
- County: Wayne

Sturgeon Bar (or Sturgeon's Bar) is a small island in the Detroit River. It is in Wayne County, in southeast Michigan. Its coordinates are 42°04′07″N 83°11′17″W, and the United States Geological Survey gave its elevation as 571 ft (174 m) in 1980. Numerous types of fish spawn at the island; a 1982 report by the U.S. Fish and Wildlife Service listed lake sturgeon, gizzard shad, goldfish, carp, emerald shiner, channel catfish, bullhead catfish, bluegill, smallmouth bass, and crappie.
