= Sugar Island Township, Michigan =

- Civil township
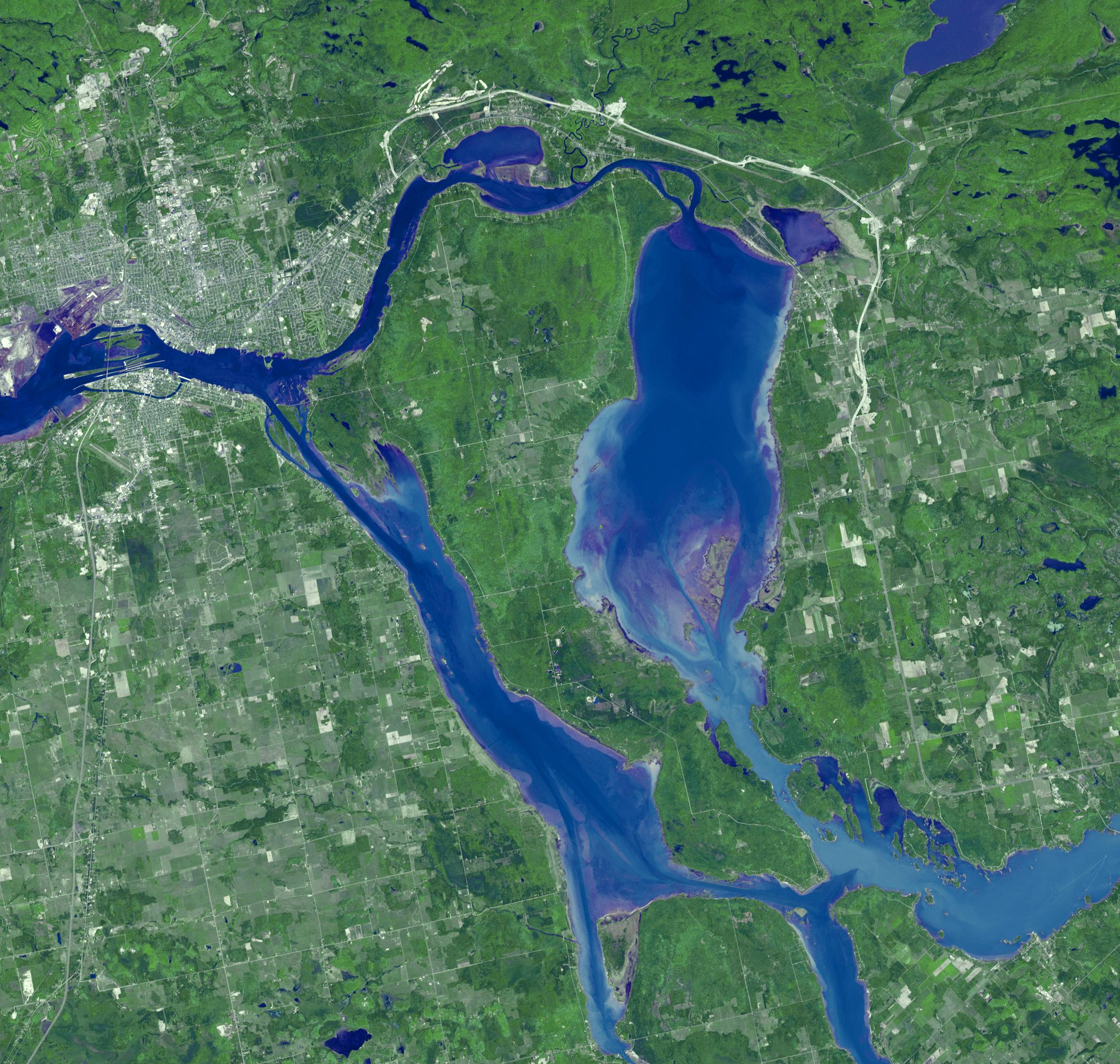
- Satellite view of Sugar Island

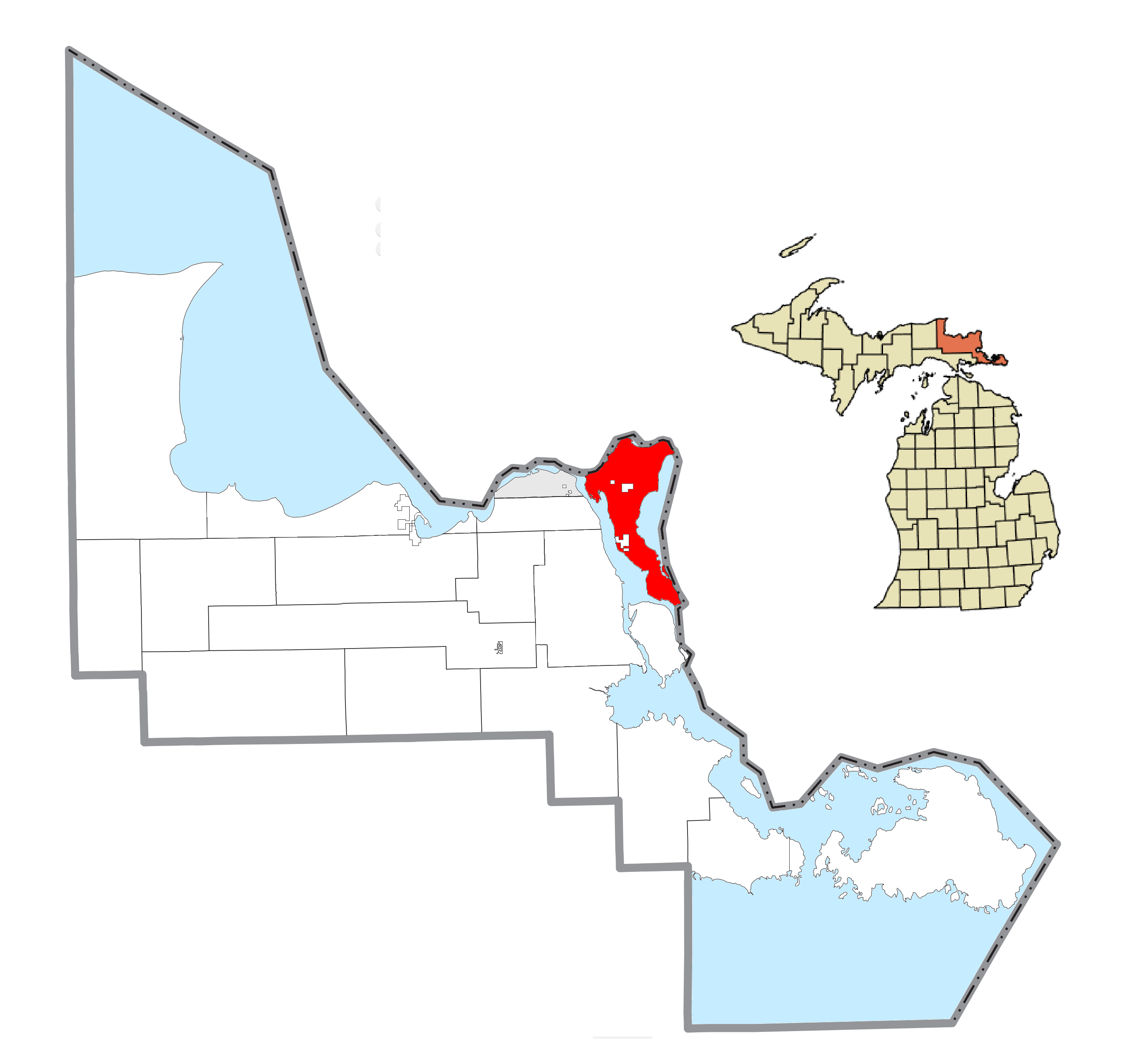
- Location within Chippewa County

- Location within the state of Michigan Location within the United States
- Coordinates: 46°27′55″N 84°12′17″W
- Country: United States
- State: Michigan
- County: Chippewa
- Established: 1857

Government
  - Supervisor: Mark Eitrem
  - Clerk: Brittany Behm

Area
  - Total: 76.46 sq mi (198.03 km^{2})
  - Land: 49.35 sq mi (127.82 km^{2})
  - Water: 27.11 sq mi (70.21 km^{2})
- Elevation: 590 ft (180 m)

Population (2020)
  - Total: 653
  - Density: 13.2/sq mi (5.1/km^{2})
- Time zone: UTC-5 (EST)
  - Summer (DST): UTC-4 (EDT)
- ZIP code(s): 49783 (Sault Ste. Marie)
- Area code: 906
- FIPS code: 26-77020
- GNIS feature ID: 1627131
- Website: Official website

Sugar Island Township is a civil township of Chippewa County in the U.S. state of Michigan. The population was 653 at the 2020 census. The township consists of Sugar Island, several smaller islands, and the surrounding waters in the St. Marys River.

Some of its land is within the reservation of the Bay Mills Indian Community, a federally recognized tribe and band of Chippewa who have long been in the region of Sault Ste. Marie, Michigan. Native Americans make up one-third of the population on the island.

== History ==
The Ojibwe (known as Chippewa in the United States) occupied the island and nearby areas for at least 500 years. Among the federally recognized tribes in Michigan is the Bay Mills Indian Community, which has territory on Sugar Island.

== Geography ==
According to the U.S. Census Bureau, the township has a total area of 76.46 square miles (198.03 km^{2}), of which 49.35 square miles (127.82 km^{2}) is land and 27.11 square miles (70.21 km^{2}) (35.46%) is water.

The township is located directly east of the city of Sault Ste. Marie, Michigan, and is connected to the city by a ferry. Sault Ste. Marie, Ontario, is to the northwest across the St. Marys River, but with no direct transportation connection. Sugar Island Township is one of only seven municipalities in the state of Michigan to consist entirely of islands, including Grosse Ile Township, Drummond Township, Bois Blanc Township, Mackinac Island, Peaine Township, and St. James Township.

== Communities ==
- Homestead is an unincorporated community on the southeastern end of the island at 46°20′17″N 84°07′21″W

== Demographics ==
As of the census of 2000, there were 683 people, 294 households, and 211 families residing in the township. In 2020, its population was 653.
