= Great Lakes Air =

Airline of the United States

Great Lakes Air, Inc.
- Ceased operations: 2022
- Operating bases: St. Ignace, Mackinac County Airport
- Hubs: Mackinac County Airport
- Fleet size: 5
- Headquarters: St. Ignace, Michigan, United States
- Website: www.greatlakesair.net

Great Lakes Air was an American fixed-base operator and charter airline based in Mackinac County Airport in St. Ignace, Michigan.

Great Lakes Air began in St. Ignace, and began air charter service from Mackinac County Airport serving various destinations throughout Michigan. Over its 30-year career, Great Lakes established a name as one of the largest air charter companies in Michigan with its main charter destination, Mackinac Island. In addition to passenger charter, cargo was also flown throughout Michigan.

In August 2019, Great Lakes Air purchased a Britten-Norman BN-2 Islander Piston Islander aircraft, in order to ensure the efficiency of its operations during the winter months.

In October 2022 the airline ceased operations.

== Fleet ==
Great Lakes Air fleet
Aircraft	Total	Passengers
Piper Cherokee 6	2	6
Beechcraft Baron	1	6
Partenavia P.68	1	6
Cessna 172	1	4
Britten-Norman BN-2 Islander	1	9

== Destinations ==
- St. Ignace
- Mackinac Island
- Bois Blanc Island
- Beaver Island
- Charlevoix
- Traverse City
- Pellston

== Accidents and incidents ==
- On February 17, 2014, a Great Lakes Air Piper Cherokee 6 N7122J made an emergency landing on the ice of Lake Huron. There were no injuries. The NTSB reported the cause of the forced landing as a fuel injector malfunction, causing fuel starvation. The plane was pulled off the ice via snow machine, and returned into service.
- On December 3, 2011, a Great Lakes Air Piper Cherokee 6 registration number N33315 en route from St. Ignace crashed upon approach to Mackinac Island Airport. The pilot and sole passenger died upon impact. The Coast Guard commenced a search and rescue operation to recover the down aircraft, locating it in a wooded area approximately 1.6 miles north of 83D. The victims were Thomas Phillips of Kirkland, Washington, an Amazon Executive, and pilot Joseph Phillips Jr. of St. Ignace. The pilot's error to properly judge weather conditions was blamed for the cause of the crash.
