= Beaver Island (Lake Michigan) =

Island in Charlevoix County, Michigan, US

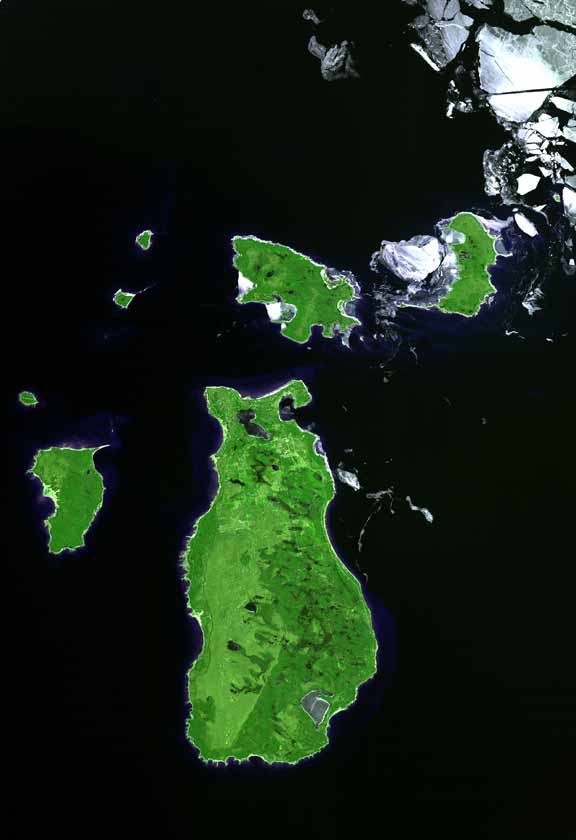
- Beaver Island (largest), as seen from space

- Location within Michigan
- Other name: Amikwag-endaad (Ojibwe)

Geography
- Location: Lake Michigan
- Coordinates: 45°40′N 85°32′W
- Area: 55.8 sq mi (145 km^{2})
- Highest elevation: 696 ft (212.1 m)

Administration
- United States
- State: Michigan
- County: Charlevoix County
- Townships: Peaine Township; St. James Township

Demographics
- Population: 616 (2020)

Beaver Island is an island in Lake Michigan in the U.S. state of Michigan. At 55.8 mi^{2} (145 km^{2}), it is the largest island in Lake Michigan and the third largest island in Michigan after Isle Royale and Drummond Island. The island is located approximately 32 miles (51 km) from the city of Charlevoix. Beaver Island had a total population of 616 at the 2020 census. Beaver Island is part of Charlevoix County.

From 1848 to 1856, Beaver Island was home to a uniquely American political and religious experiment, a Mormon theocracy and monarchy ruled by King James Strang, who unsuccessfully challenged Brigham Young for the post-Joseph Smith leadership of Mormonism. Despite failing to gain a majority following, Strang remained the self-appointed leader of a Mormon splinter group, who were known colloquially as the Strangites to distinguish them from the much larger and mainstream Church of Jesus Christ of Latter-day Saints. After Strang's assassination in 1856, dispossessed Irish American fishermen from the County Donegal Gaeltacht returned, expelled the Strangites who now have a small community in Vorree Wisconsin, and retook the island, which is now a popular vacation and tourist destination. Portions of the island and surrounding archipelago are protected as part of the Beaver Islands State Wildlife Research Area.

== History ==
=== Prehistory ===
There are at least two stone circle sites located on Beaver Island. The main site, Beaver Island Sun Circle (site no: 20CX65) (aka Beaver Island Stone Circle, or Beaver Island Stonehenge), is an unusually symmetrical 397-foot diameter stone circle consisting of approximately 39 (up to 150) stones and boulders of various sizes, from 2 feet to 10 feet with a ground height of 6 inches to 4 feet, with some stones presenting the appearance of hand-carved symbols and incised lines, hieroglyphs or pictographs including: geometric shapes, Algonquian thunderbirds, bulls, feathers, human faces/heads, human figures, and early Celtic writing. An example of these face/head markings, the Carved Face Rock, is on display at the Mormon Print Shop Museum. The site is located on the northwestern side of the island bisected by Mrs Reddings Trail, south of Angeline's Bluff Lookout, near Peshawbestown, a historic Native American village. It is considered a sacred site by the Anishinaabemowin and Anishinaabe culture, as explained in 1990 by Frank Ettawageshik, Little Traverse Bay Bands of Odawa Indians (LTBBOI) Tribal Chairman.

The site was discovered in 1985 by Dr. Terri Bussey, of the Grand Rapids Inter-Tribal Council, who would spend 32 summers researching and documenting the site. It was further investigated in 1988 at Bussey's request by Dr. Donald P. Heldman, Mackinac Island State Park Commission archaeologist, and Dr. Elizabeth B. Garland, Western Michigan University Anthropology professor. The stone circle construction date has been estimated to be approximately 1,000 years ago, possibly produced by the Mississippian people, and was possibly used by the Odawa Indigenous peoples as a solar and lunar medicine wheel calendar or for navigation. The site is astronomically aligned with the midsummer solstice, the center stone positioned under the North Star, and appears to chart constellations like the Big Dipper.

The validity of the site has been scrutinized and disputed since its discovery as being a misinterpreted common geological phenomenon, such as a random scattering of rocks or glacial deposits by other archeologists like Dr. Charles Cleland, Michigan State University Anthropology professor, and Dr. Christian Feest, Austrian ethnologist and ethnohistorian that specializes in the Native Americans of Eastern North America and the Northeastern United States. The site has been protected/owned since 1988 by the LTBBOI (Public Law: 103-324), and interpreted by the Amik Circle Society, a 501(c)3 organization (EIN: 81-3233690) originally formed in the 1990s and dedicated to understanding and protecting "the many stone circles, mounds and burial sites found in the Islands."

The island's second site discovered by M. T. Bussey in 2014, Fairy Stone Circle, is located on the northeastern side of the island bisected by East Side Drive, north of Mike Boyles Beach Road, and shows similar astronomical alignments as the Beaver Island Sun Circle.

=== Pre-colonial history ===
Beaver Island was called "amikwag-endaad" by the Ojibwe, meaning "where the beavers live".

The Odawa, who speak a dialect of the Ojibwe language, lived on Beaver Island for at least 300 years prior to its settlement by more recent immigrants. The region of Lake Michigan that surrounds Beaver Island has an unenviable reputation in the long history of shipwrecks on the Great Lakes, and a wreck within swimming distance of the island itself has been proposed as the possible last resting place of La Salle's missing 1679 flagship Le Griffon, which is widely considered the "Holy Grail" among Great Lakes shipwreck hunters.

The Odawa population on Beaver Island was so large that a fur trading post was established there in the late 1830s. Despite Federal legislation criminalizing the sale of alcohol to Native Americans, the former location of the trading post is still known, revealingly, as "Whiskey Point".

=== The Mormon Kingdom ===
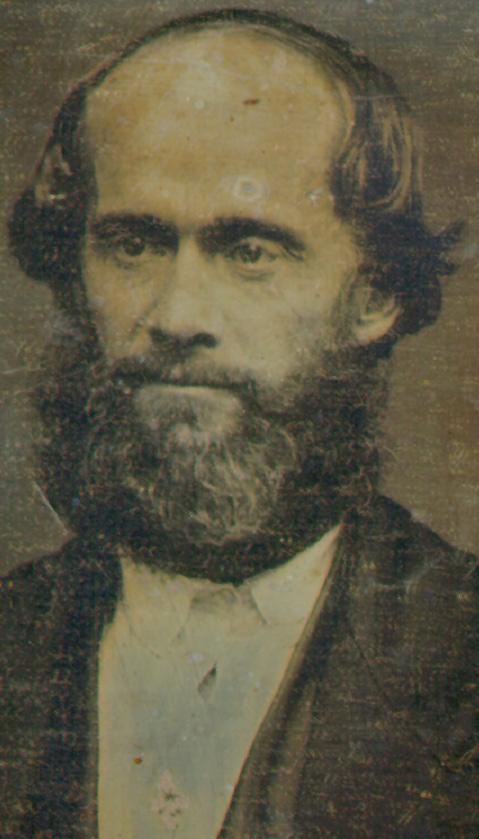
1856 daguerreotype of James Strang, taken on Beaver Island the year of his death by J. Atkyn, itinerant photographer who later became one of Strang's assassins

Although Beaver Island is known today mostly for its beaches, forests, recreational harbor and seclusion, previously it was the site of a unique Latter Day Saint kingdom.

The island's association with Mormonism began with the death of Joseph Smith, the founder of the Latter Day Saint movement. Most Latter Day Saints considered Brigham Young to be his successor, but many others followed James J. Strang, who argued his own claim using a letter that he said Smith had written and mailed to him. Strang founded the Church of Jesus Christ of Latter Day Saints (Strangite), claiming it was the sole legitimate continuation of the church that Joseph Smith founded. His group initially settled in Voree, Wisconsin Territory, in 1844, and established a community there that persists today as an unincorporated community within the town of Burlington, Wisconsin. Seeking refuge from religious persecution, Strang and his followers moved from Voree to Beaver Island in 1848.

At the time, unlike the Danish-American settlement on nearby Garden Island, Beaver Island was inhabited by mostly Irish Catholic immigrants. In particular they came from an Ulster Irish-speaking island (off the coast of County Donegal) called Arranmore (Irish: Árainn Mhór).

The Strangites flourished under their Prophet's rule and, due to the Island's strategic location, they became both an economic and political power in the region at the expense of nearby Mackinac Island. The Strangites also founded the town of St. James, which was named in honor of Strang. They constructed a road denominated "King's Highway" into the interior of the island that remains one of its primary thoroughfares. The Strangites cleared land; constructed cabins, farms and other improvements; and attempted to establish themselves permanently on the island.

In fact, Strang became powerful enough to force the "Gentiles", or non-Mormons, of Beaver Island to pay tithes to his church. "Gentiles" who refused were allegedly subjected to flogging or violently driven off their land claims. Nothing, however, would have been more infuriating to Irish Catholic immigrants, for whom the events of the Tithe War were still a recent memory, than having once more to pay tithes to a denomination other than their own.

Irish Americans on the island, who were not welcome in St. James, first moved to a new settlement around Cable Bay, on Beaver Island's southern tip. The Ojibwe and Odawa population, on the other hand, fled to nearby Garden Island, where they sided invariably with the Strangites' enemies to the point that Strang later alleged that the Indians had been, "armed and hunting me for my life."

After first decreeing eleven days before the election that, "every Gentile family must come to the harbor and be baptized into the Church of Zion or leave the island within ten days", Strang was unanimously elected to the Michigan House of Representatives in 1853 and again in 1855. He founded the first newspaper in Northern Michigan, the Northern Islander. During his tenure in the State Legislature, he made the island the center of the new County of Manitou, which included the Beaver Islands, Fox Islands and North Manitou and South Manitou Islands, and set the county seat at St. James in Beaver Island. The State of Michigan, however, abolished Manitou County in 1895 (see below).

After meeting and falling in love with 17-year-old Elvira Field during a mission trip in 1849, Strang declared that God had commanded him to become a polygamist, contrary to his previous opposition to polygamy. After allegedly eloping with Strang, Miss Field became the second of an ultimate five wives, by whom Strang fathered a total of fourteen children.

James J. Strang proclaimed himself "King of Heaven and Earth", and was crowned on 8 July 1850 inside a large log "tabernacle" that his adherents erected, in an elaborate coronation ceremony. On him was bestowed a crown that a witness described as "a shiny metal ring with a cluster of glass stars in the front", a royal red robe, shield, breastplate, and wooden scepter.

Meanwhile, ships sailing near Beaver Island routinely, "sailed into a crack in the Lake", even during the summer, when shipwrecks in the region were highly unusual. During Strang's rule and for decades afterwards, allegations of Mormon acts of piracy, wrecking through the use of false light beacons and the cutting of anchor cables by Strangites on skiffs, the mass murder of male shipwreck survivors, and the subjecting of attractive female shipwreck survivors to forced marriage, continued to be commonly told by Beaver Island residents, as well as by Great Lakes sailors and fishermen.

In an interview with folklorist Ivan Walton, one old sailor later recalled, "Old Strang was a bad one. One time there was a fine old schooner anchored down here in Sand Bay to wait out a blow. She was a fine old schooner and when it came dark, them Mormons came done on her and murdered the whole crew except the two daughters of the Captain who were making the trip with him. Strang sees them and has him put on his boat and struck for the harbor with them but on the way one of the girls jumps overboard and they think she was drowned and went on but she swam back to the schooner and got a hold of the bob stays and there she was a-hanging when two Irishmen seeing the schooner and thinking she might be in trouble, rowed out and found the girl almost exhausted. Well, she told them her story and they took her back with them. One of the men was married and his wife took care of her and the fellow who wasn't married went to the nearest Mormon house and with two loaded pistols, stole a horse and rode as fast it could run right up Strang's big palace and went in and made them all put their hands up except the girl, who he told to go out and get on the horse and as soon as she did he backed out still keeping their hands up. There was old Strang and his five wives and some others and he got out and on the horse and rode with the girl. He later married her."

According to Strang's biographer Miles Harvey, there are numerous well-documented cases of groups of Strangites, who saw non-Mormons as the enemy, making marauding raids in settlements around the shores of Lake Michigan. Their acts included timber piracy, counterfeiting, home invasions, armed robbery, and horse theft in Koshkonong, Wisconsin, Perrysburg, Ohio, Woodstock, Illinois, and the theft of fishing equipment from the refugee fishermen in Mackinac Island. Furthermore, on July 13, 1853, Mormon fishermen from Beaver Island fought a pitched battle on Lake Michigan against fishermen from what is now Charlevoix, Michigan.

Strang, however, insisted through his newspaper that all of these charges were lies motivated by Anti-Mormonism.

Strang and his adherents often conflicted with their neighbors on the island and adjacent locales. While claiming dominion of only his church, Strang tended to exert authority over non-Strangites on the island also and was regularly accused of forcibly seizing their property and ordering physical assaults against them. Meanwhile, the island and surrounding County were ruled with Strang as the political boss, while the Strangites imposed both a monarchy and theocracy upon local government that violated both the American system of Republicanism and the separation of church and state. Even before the new County's creation, Strang was powerful enough to order the Treasurer of Mackinac County to surrender one-tenth of Beaver Island's tax revenue to his church.

Open hostility between the two groups frequently became violent, and a growing number of Irish-American refugees fled to Mackinac Island. Other Irish-Americans once assaulted Strangites at the post office and, in what is still called the "Battle of Whiskey Point", Strang fired a cannon at a private army of Irish-American fishermen who had come to retake the island and expel the Strangite church.

Meanwhile, one former Strangite later recalled that more and more Mormon families were, "leading a double life, seemingly good Mormons, but only waiting for the opportunity to get away". The beginning of the end came when Strang ordered all Mormon women to wear bloomers instead of dresses. When two Mormon women refused obedience, Strang punished them by having their husbands flogged, an act that was rendered less unpopular after one of them was discovered in flagrante delicto while committing adultery. While recovering from their floggings, both outraged husbands vowed revenge against Strang. On June 16, 1856, the United States Navy gunboat USS Michigan entered the harbor of St. James and Strang was invited aboard. As Strang walked along the dock the two Mormon flogging victims followed by several other disaffected Strangites repeatedly shot the Mormon king from behind and pistol-whipped him as he lay dying. The shooters, Thomas Bedford and Alexander Wentworth, then boarded the gunboat, which refused to surrender them to the Mormon Sheriff and instead sailed away and disembarked both men in Mackinac Island. Mackinac's own Sheriff Julius Granger, who also kept the Grove House, took both shooters into custody and lodged them at his boarding house. Bedford and Wentworth were briefly ‘tried,’ fined $1.25 each for the judges service and released to a cheering supportive, and sympathetic crowd. No one was ever convicted of Strang's murder. Following the ‘trial’ the freed men departed Mackinac Island for Green Bay, Wisc.

After Strang died of his wounds on July 9, 1856, mobs of dispossessed Irish fishermen from Mackinac Island and St. Helena Island arrived and expelled the Strangites, who then numbered approximately 2,600, from their claims on Beaver Island.

The Strangite tabernacle and Strang's royal palace no longer survive, neither does the Strangite regalia, but a printing shop that his disciples erected persists as the only Strangite-era building still existing on Beaver Island. The Mormon printing shop now houses a museum of local history. The Strangite church continues to exist, though not on Beaver Island, and numbers a maximum of 300 adherents.

According to Frederick Stonehouse, "Whether Strang and his Mormons were guilty of the charges of piracy and murder their enemies levelled at them or not is unknown. In today's more politically correct climate, the feeling is that the charges were trumped up by their enemies, who were jealous of the success of the 'Saints'. As usual, the truth is likely somewhere between the two extremes. There is a persistent rumor of treasure on Beaver Island. As the old tale goes it is part of King Strang's ill-gotten gains and is 'buried' in Fox Lake in a large chest. Over the years, people have searched for it without result, but of course, if someone did find it, is it wise to announce it to the world or just keep mum?"

=== "America's Emerald Isle" ===
Irish Catholic fishermen from Gull Island, Mackinac Island and various port cities of mainland Michigan, and also emigrants from County Donegal, Ireland, rapidly replaced the Strangites in Beaver Island. Their community, which more immigration from the Gaeltacht increased, developed a unique identity that isolation from the mainland fostered. Catholic sermons and even quotidian conversations were in Ulster Irish for decades. By the middle of the 1880s the island became the largest supplier of freshwater fish consumed in the US, yet overfishing and technological change ended this dominance by 1893.

After the expulsion of the Strangites, local government in Manitou County, which included Beaver Island, almost ceased. Court sessions and elections were rarely held, county offices were often left vacant, and the region acquired a reputation for lawlessness. Michigan Governor John J. Bagley affirmed this reputation in 1877 when he advocated for abolition of the county. A bill was introduced to this effect yet failed to be enacted. A second attempt in 1895 was more successful, and Beaver Island was incorporated into Charlevoix County while Fox and Manitou Islands were incorporated into Leelanau County.

The 24-room King Strang Hotel was built in 1901 by Capt. Manus Bonner. Originally named the Beaver Hotel by Bonner, in the 1930s the new owner, Everett Cole, renamed it the King Strang Hotel after James Jesse Strang, the Mormon leader of Beaver Island in the mid-19th century. The hotel was sold in March 1982, and was reopened as the King Strang Hotel Club, a private club where each member owns a share of stock in the club. The local club members consider it an escape and refuge from the Detroiters in the summer.

In addition to King Strang, the island became the residence of two other locally famous persons. Father Peter Gallagher, a priest from 1865 to 1898, was a colorful and charismatic leader who dominated insular society. He once engaged one of his parishioners in a fistfight in the insular chapel. Feodor Protar, who arrived in 1893, was a member of the religious movement founded by Leo Tolstoy. He served as a local doctor and friend-to-all while living as a recluse in a cabin in the interior of the island. Protar died in 1925 and left many admirers.

In 1938, John W. Green (1871–1963), a resident of Beaver Island, was recorded by folklorist and ethnomusicologist Alan Lomax singing traditional songs, which can be heard on the Library of Congress website.

Logging, which was always an important part of the insular economy, greatly increased with the formation of the Beaver Island Logging Company in 1901. Docks, housing, railroads and a mill impacted the local scenery, while fishing continued as the primary economic activity. The collapse of the Great Lakes fish population caused by the accidental introduction of the lamprey eel by deep sea ships during the 1940s and '50s also caused the exodus of most of the residents, until tourism in the 1970s renewed interest in the island.

== Geography ==
The island is 13 miles (21 km) long, 3 to 6 miles (5 to 10 km) wide, and is part of Charlevoix County, Michigan. It is mostly flat and sandy, with large forested tracts. According to data of the US census, it has 55.773 square miles (144.45 square kilometres) of land, and a permanent population of 657 as of 2010. The more densely populated part, which comprises a mere 6% of total insular land, is within Saint James Township on the northern part of the island. The census of 2010 reported its population as 365. St. James Township also includes Garden Island, High Island, Hog Island and several minor islands in Lake Michigan, which are all permanently uninhabited. Peaine Township, which comprises the remaining 94% of insular land, contains large parcels of state land which are managed as part of the Beaver Islands State Wildlife Research Area. The research area is mostly undeveloped, with some relictual homesteads within the township that were constructed in the clearings of successful farms of the nineteenth century. In 2010 the township had a population of 292.

The island has several small to moderately sized lakes, including Lake Geneserath in the southeast, Greenes Lake and Fox Lake in the central part, and Font Lake, Egg Lake, Round Lake and Barneys Lake in the northern part. There are only two named streams: Jordan River that flows into Sand Bay on the eastern part of the island and Iron Ore Creek that flows into Iron Ore Bay on the southern part.

=== Climate ===
The island is within a climatic region that has great seasonal differences in temperature, with warm to hot, and often humid, summers and cold, even severely cold, winters. According to the Köppen Climate Classification system, it has a humid continental climate, which is abbreviated "Dfb" on climatic maps.

Climate data for Beaver Island (1991–2020 normals, extremes 1905–present)
Month	Jan	Feb	Mar	Apr	May	Jun	Jul	Aug	Sep	Oct	Nov	Dec	Year
Record high °F (°C)	54 (12)	59 (15)	79 (26)	82 (28)	88 (31)	95 (35)	94 (34)	93 (34)	90 (32)	81 (27)	72 (22)	61 (16)	95 (35)
Mean daily maximum °F (°C)	26.7 (−2.9)	28.3 (−2.1)	37.2 (2.9)	49.2 (9.6)	62.6 (17.0)	71.7 (22.1)	76.1 (24.5)	75.0 (23.9)	67.6 (19.8)	54.9 (12.7)	43.1 (6.2)	32.9 (0.5)	52.1 (11.2)
Daily mean °F (°C)	21.0 (−6.1)	21.3 (−5.9)	29.2 (−1.6)	40.2 (4.6)	52.3 (11.3)	61.9 (16.6)	67.2 (19.6)	66.9 (19.4)	60.0 (15.6)	48.4 (9.1)	37.5 (3.1)	27.9 (−2.3)	44.5 (6.9)
Mean daily minimum °F (°C)	15.2 (−9.3)	14.3 (−9.8)	21.2 (−6.0)	31.3 (−0.4)	42.0 (5.6)	52.1 (11.2)	58.3 (14.6)	58.9 (14.9)	52.4 (11.3)	41.9 (5.5)	31.9 (−0.1)	23.0 (−5.0)	36.9 (2.7)
Record low °F (°C)	−24 (−31)	−25 (−32)	−21 (−29)	2 (−17)	20 (−7)	30 (−1)	35 (2)	35 (2)	27 (−3)	10 (−12)	5 (−15)	−13 (−25)	−25 (−32)
Average precipitation inches (mm)	2.04 (52)	1.21 (31)	1.81 (46)	2.59 (66)	2.95 (75)	2.76 (70)	2.59 (66)	2.96 (75)	3.71 (94)	3.04 (77)	2.68 (68)	2.15 (55)	30.48 (774)
Average snowfall inches (cm)	23.1 (59)	14.6 (37)	10.7 (27)	3.6 (9.1)	0.2 (0.51)	0.0 (0.0)	0.0 (0.0)	0.0 (0.0)	0.0 (0.0)	0.1 (0.25)	4.6 (12)	18.3 (46)	75.0 (191)
Average precipitation days (≥ 0.01 in)	10	7	7	8	9	9	8	8	9	9	9	10	101
Source 1: NOAA
Source 2: Western Regional Climate Center (precipitation 1952–present)

== Economy ==
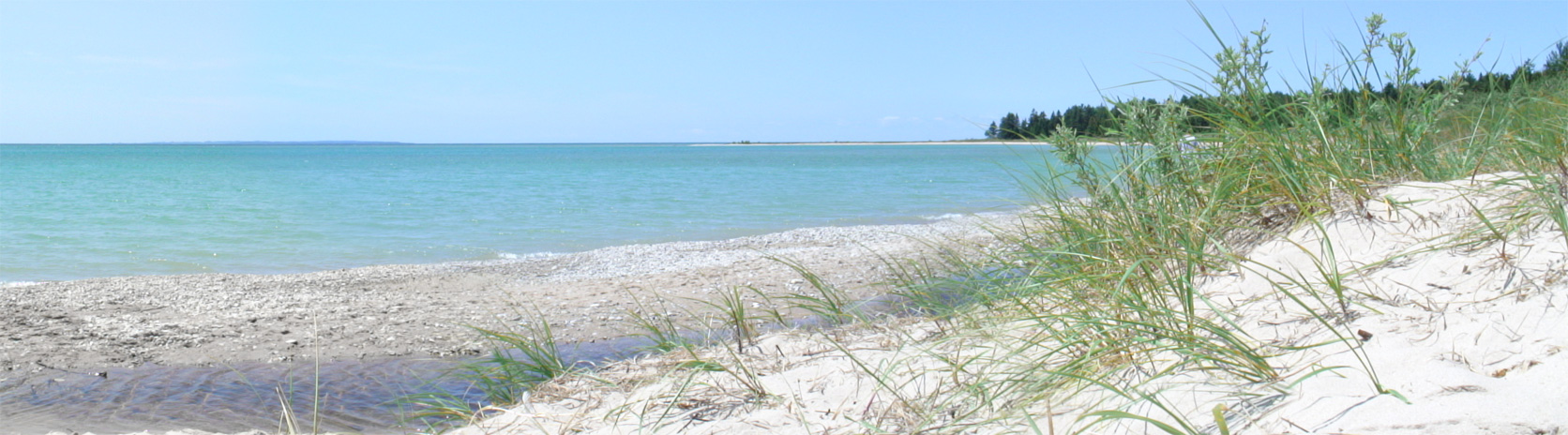
Iron Ore Bay on the southern part of Beaver Island. North Fox Island is visible on the horizon.

Historically, the primary industries in the island are fishing, logging and farming. Presently the economy centers in governmental services, tourism and residential and cottage construction. Recreational opportunities abound in the insular harbor, beaches, inland lakes and the state forest that includes much of the island. A golf course, nature trails, restaurants, hotels, a marina and other amenities are available.

The island describes itself as "America's Emerald Isle" in allusion to the Irish ancestry of many of its residents.

Central Michigan University owns and operates a research facility in the island, denominated the "CMU Biological Station". The station hosts classes and workshops for students and researchers. CMU also owns a former Coast Guard Boathouse on Whiskey Point in the northern part of the island and part of Miller's Marsh.

The island is served by Beaver Island Community School.

== Transportation ==
Two airlines serve Beaver Island: Island Airways and Fresh Air Aviation. Flights between Beaver Island and Charlevoix typically take approximately 15 minutes and operate multiple times daily throughout the year. Island Airways operates flights to Welke Airport (6Y8), a privately owned public-use airport located approximately one mile (1.6 km) south of St. James. Fresh Air Aviation flies into the public Beaver Island Airport (KSJX), located on the western side of the island, a little over 4 miles (6.4 km) from St. James. Air service plays an important role in the island's transportation, particularly during winter months when ferry service is suspended.

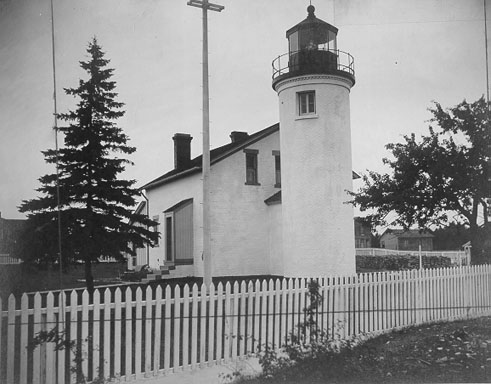
St. James Light in Beaver Island Harbor, pre-WWII

The Beaver Island Boat Company operates seasonal ferry service between Charlevoix and Beaver Island. Daily sailings run from May through September, with a reduced schedule from October to mid-December. Service is suspended from January through March due to ice and weather conditions. The trip across Lake Michigan takes approximately two hours, depending on weather. The company operates two vessels: the Emerald Isle, built in 1997, and the Beaver Islander, in service for over 60 years. Vehicle capacity is limited aboard the ferry, and advance reservations are required.

Two lighthouses are on the island:

- Beaver Island Harbor Light (St. James Light), erected in 1870, is located on the northern part of the island and remains in operation as an aid to navigation.
- Beaver Island Head Lighthouse on the southern part of the island, erected in 1851, was deactivated in 1962 and is listed on the National Register of Historic Places. This lighthouse was established to aid the increasing maritime traffic navigating between Beaver Island and North Fox Island.

== Archipelago ==
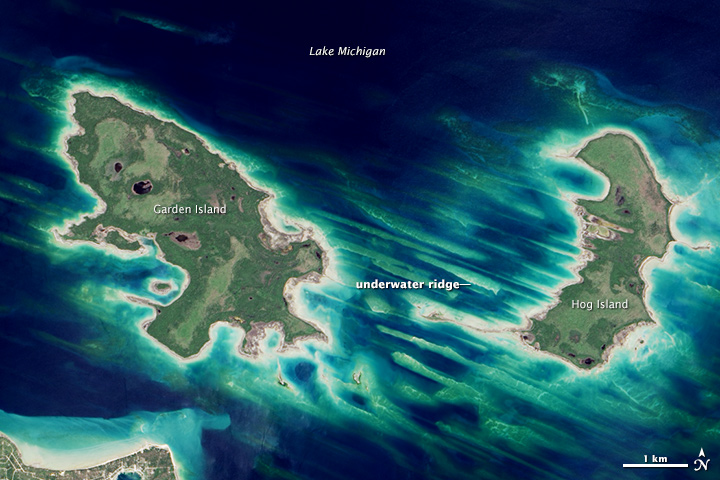
Annotated view of Garden and Hog island from orbit

The islands of the Beaver Islands archipelago include, in approximate order of size from largest to smallest:

- Beaver Island
- Garden Island
- High Island
- South Fox Island
- Hog Island
- North Fox Island
- Gull Island
- Whiskey Island
- Ojibwa Island
- Trout Island
- Grape Island
- Hat Island
- Shoe Island
- Pismire Island

Gull, Hat, Pismire, and Shoe Islands comprise the Lake Michigan division of the Michigan Islands National Wildlife Refuge and are administered as a satellite of the Seney National Wildlife Refuge. Pismire and Shoe Islands are also part of the Michigan Islands Wilderness Area.

== Events ==
=== Dark Sky ===
On April 8, 2024, the Beaver Island State Wildlife Research Area International Dark Sky Sanctuary (locally known as "the Sanctuary") was established, encompassing 9.425.5 acres of the island. The advocacy group, DarkSky International, gave the designation of sanctuary, stating the Sanctuary is one of "the most remote (and often darkest) places in the world, whose conservation state is most fragile." Thus recognizing Beaver Island as one of the best places in the world to see the stars and a place actively working to preserve those conditions. In honor of Beaver Island being involved in the Dark Sky Project, Beaver Island Community Center creates events to bring the community together to view various phenomena such as constellations, meteor showers, and the Northern Lights.

=== Beaver Island Music Festival ===
The Beaver Island Music Festival brings music artists from around the world to perform in the wilderness of Beaver Island. Founded in 2003, the festival is centered around combining music and wilderness together. The Festival is catered to all ages but is centered around nature at the core. The festival is typically during the third week of July, and it lasts three days. Some of the well-known performers of the festival include Sponge, an American rock band founded in Detroit; Lipstick Jodi; The Burney Sisters; etc. The Beaver Island Music Festival involves local businesses and community members to establish itself as a community-wide organization.

=== Beaver Island Bike Festival ===
The Beaver Island Bike Festival allows bikers to enjoy the scenery of Beaver Island at their own leisure. The festival occurs during the third week of June. Biker can bike 20 to 42 miles of self-paced biking. Campgrounds, rest stops, food, drinks, and restrooms are provided for those attending. Bikers can also visit the scattered historical sights and monuments throughout the island. There is also a downtown party to conclude the festival where music and entertainment is provided.

=== Baroque on Beaver ===
Founded in 2001, Baroque on Beaver is an event where orchestral and vocal performers come to Beaver Island during the end of July and beginning weeks of August. This event is presented by the Beaver Island Performing Arts Alliance (BIPAA), where they strive to bring Classical music to this remote Great Lakes island.

=== Beaver Island Irish Féile ===
Beginning in 2019, the Beaver Island Irish Féile showcases the Irish heritage of Beaver Island. The event takes place during the second week of September. The event includes Irish traditional music and activities that center around the unique history of the Island.

== See also ==
- Populated islands of the Great Lakes
- List of islands of Michigan
- List of islands of the United States
