= Mackinac County Airport =

Airport in Michigan, United States

- IATA: none; ICAO: none; FAA LID: 83D

Summary
- Airport type: Public
- Owner: Mackinac County Board of Commissioners
- Serves: St. Ignace, Michigan
- Elevation AMSL: 624 ft / 190 m
- Coordinates: 45°53′29″N 084°44′17″W

Map
- Location of airport in Michigan 83D (the United States)

Runways
Direction	Length		Surface
Direction	ft	m	Surface
7/25	3,800	1,158	Concrete

Statistics (2021)
- Aircraft operations: 33,050
- Based aircraft: 11
- Source: Federal Aviation Administration

Mackinac County Airport (FAA LID: 83D) is a county-owned public-use airport in Mackinac County, Michigan, United States. It is located 2 nautical miles (2.3 mi; 3.7 km) northwest of the central business district of St. Ignace. It is the closest airport to Mackinac Island Airport with a refueling station, and is a major stopover destination for flights to and from Mackinac Island that require refueling. The airport is included in the Federal Aviation Administration (FAA) National Plan of Integrated Airport Systems for 2017–2021, in which it is categorized as a local general aviation facility.

The airport received $30,000 from the U.S. Department of Transportation in 2020 as part of the CARES Act to help mitigate the effects of the COVID-19 pandemic.

== Facilities and aircraft ==
Mackinac County Airport covers an area of 200 acres (81 ha) at an elevation of 624 feet (190 m) above mean sea level. It has one runway designated 7/25 with a concrete surface measuring 3,800 by 75 feet (1,158 by 23 m).

For the 12-month period ending December 31, 2021, the airport had 33,050 aircraft operations, an average of 90 per day: 54% general aviation, 45% air taxi and <1% military. In December 2021, there were 11 aircraft based at this airport: 10 single-engine and 1 multi-engine.

== Incidents and accidents ==
- On August 2, 1994, a Grumman HU-16 seaplane originating from Mackinac County Airport registered as N7025N collided with a moored boat in the north cove of St. Helena Island, near St. Ignace, Michigan. The pilot and boat operator had prearranged to meet in the cove. The airplane received minor damage, and the pilot, co-pilot, and seven airplane passengers reported no injuries. Two adults and a four-year-old child received minor injuries immediately prior to the collision when they were abandoning the boat. Another child remaining on the boat was fatally injured.
- On July 13, 2010, a privately owned Beechcraft Baron 58, registered as N3081N, en route from Mackinac Island Airport to Chicago Executive Airport crashed shortly after takeoff from Mackinac County Airport where it had stopped to refuel. Four Israeli-American citizens were killed, and another was seriously injured.
- On December 3, 2011, a Great Lakes Air Piper Cherokee Six registered as N33315 en route from Mackinac County Airport crashed upon approach to Mackinac Island Airport. The pilot and sole passenger died upon impact. The Coast Guard commenced a search and rescue operation to recover the down aircraft, locating it in a wooded area approximately 1.6 miles north of runway 83D. The victims were Tom Phillips of Kirkland, Washington, an Amazon Executive, and pilot Joseph Phillips Jr. of St. Ignace. The pilot's error to properly judge weather conditions was named as the cause of the crash.

== See also ==
- List of airports in Michigan
