= Hog Island (Michigan) =

Island in Michigan, United States

- Location within Michigan

Geography
- Location: Lake Michigan
- Coordinates: 45°47′30″N 85°21′58″W
- Area: 3.24 sq mi (8.4 km^{2})
- Highest elevation: 587 ft (178.9 m)

Administration
- United States
- State: Michigan
- County: Charlevoix County
- Township: St. James Township

Demographics
- Population: Uninhabited

Hog Island, an uninhabited 2,075-acre (8 km^{2}) island in Lake Michigan, is the fourth largest island in the Beaver Island archipelago. It is owned by the U.S. state of Michigan as part of the Beaver Islands State Wildlife Research Area and is administered by the Michigan Department of Natural Resources.

== Geography ==
Hog Island is part of the Beaver Island archipelago, a cluster of islands in the northern portion of Lake Michigan. These islands are composed of erosion-resistant rock that protruded above the water after retreating glaciers had carved out the basin that holds Lake Michigan. Hog Island is approximately 4 miles (6.5 km) long in a north–south direction, and lies off the shore of Emmet County, Michigan. Its low, swampy terrain is of significant interest to naturalists because it is one of the least-disturbed islands in Lake Michigan. Hog Island is very difficult to reach, even by boat. There is point access from Hog Island Point State Forest, which is located just off US Highway 2, seven miles from Naubinway, Michigan.

== Flora and fauna ==
The island's wetlands are important spawning grounds for yellow perch and smallmouth bass, as well as lake birds that feed on fish, such as the common tern, listed as threatened within Michigan.

Three endemic riparian plant species, Houghton's goldenrod, the Lake Huron tansy, and Pitcher's thistle, have been identified on Hog Island. All three plants are listed as threatened within Michigan. Old-growth northern hardwood and boreal softwood groves also exist on the island.

== View ==
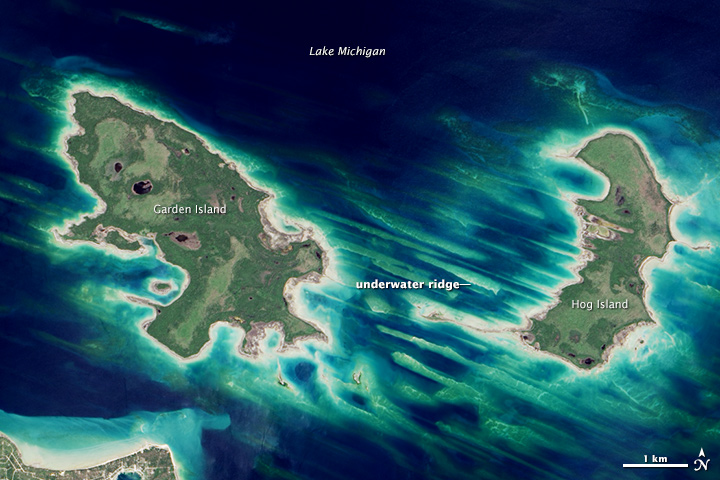
Garden and Hog island from orbit
