= Beaver Islands State Wildlife Research Area =

Protected areas in Michigan, United States

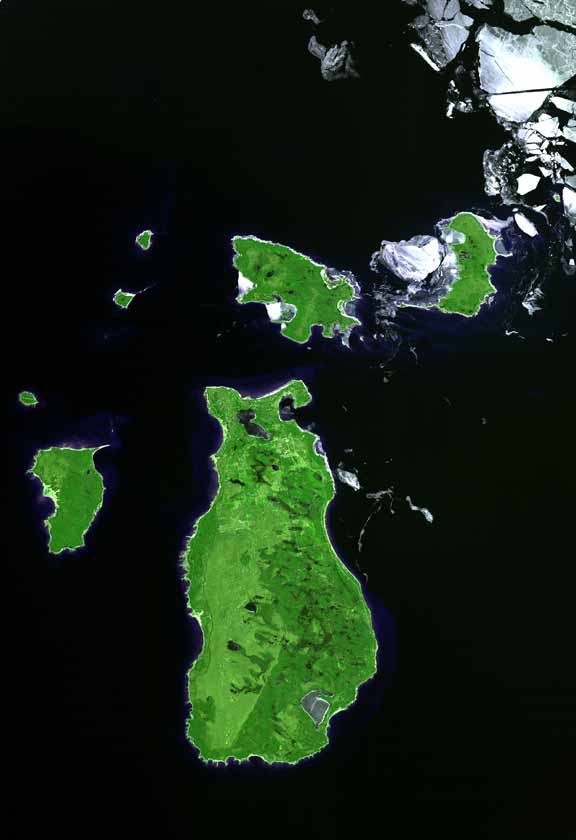
- Satellite view of the Beaver Island archipelago

- Location within Michigan Location within the United States
- Location: Several islands within Lake Michigan
- Nearest city: Charlevoix, Michigan
- Coordinates: 45°30′00″N 85°45′00″W
- Area: 43,489 acres (175.99 km^{2})
- Elevation: 577 feet (176 m)
- Governing body: Michigan Department of Natural Resources

The Beaver Islands State Wildlife Research Area is a networked set of insular properties of the U.S. state of Michigan. The Research Area is approximately 23,154 acres in size. Properties in the Research Area include much of the southern half of Beaver Island, almost all of Garden Island, all of High Island, all of Hog Island, all of North Fox Island, and most of the northern half of South Fox Island. All of these islands are located in Lake Michigan. The insular research area is overseen by the Michigan Department of Natural Resources.

== Description ==
The Research Area properties is primarily made up of lands that were either never patented for settlement, or were logged off and then allowed to revert to the state of Michigan in lieu of unpaid property taxes. Approximately 55% of the Research Area by land extent is located on the largest of the islands, Beaver Island, and almost 20% on the second largest island, Garden Island. The remaining one-quarter of the Research Area is distributed among the largest four remaining islands of northern Lake Michigan. The Research Area cooperates with a federal unit, the Michigan Islands National Wildlife Refuge, which controls a separate set of four much smaller islands within the same archipelago.

The Research Area is a place for the study of shoreline animal, bird, and plant life. The Michigan DNR manages the northern four islands of the Research area, located in Charlevoix County, from a full-time staffed office in Gaylord, Michigan. Properties on the two southern Fox Islands, located in Leelanau County, are managed from a staffed office in Cadillac, Michigan.

The Research Area hosts field studies on biology and ecology. As is shown by the name of Hog Island, the islands have been and continue to be altered by human life and use. Hunting, fishing, boating, and camping are allowed subject to state laws and regulations. There is, however, no regularly scheduled passenger service to any of these islands except Beaver Island, and several of the islands within the Research Area are very infrequently visited as of 2022.

== Gallery ==
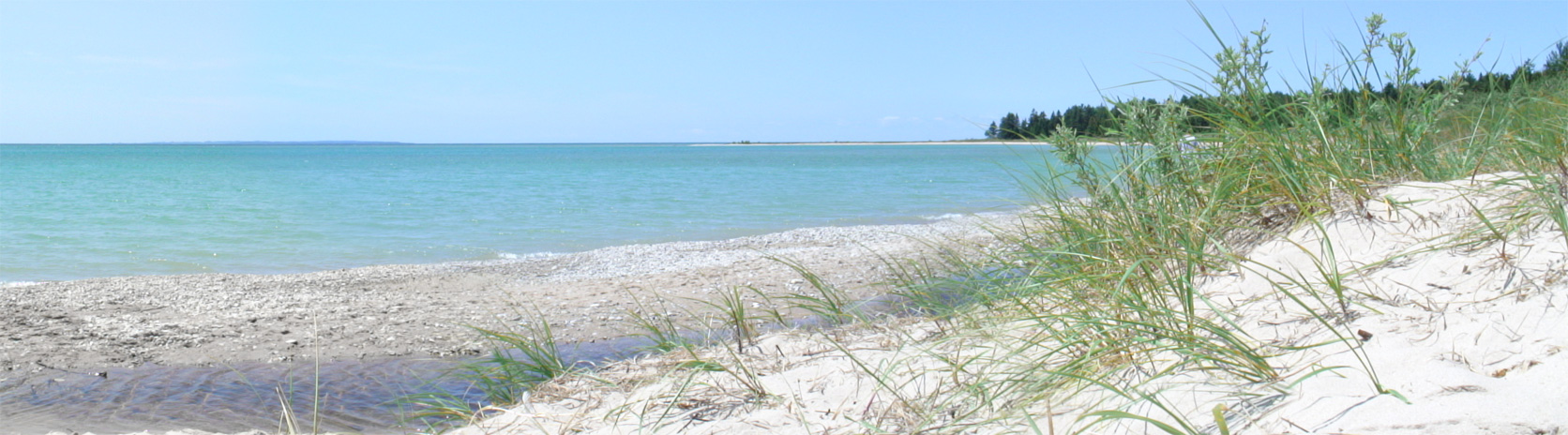
A beachfront on Iron Ore Bay on the southern shore of Beaver Island, with North Fox Island distantly visible in the left background.

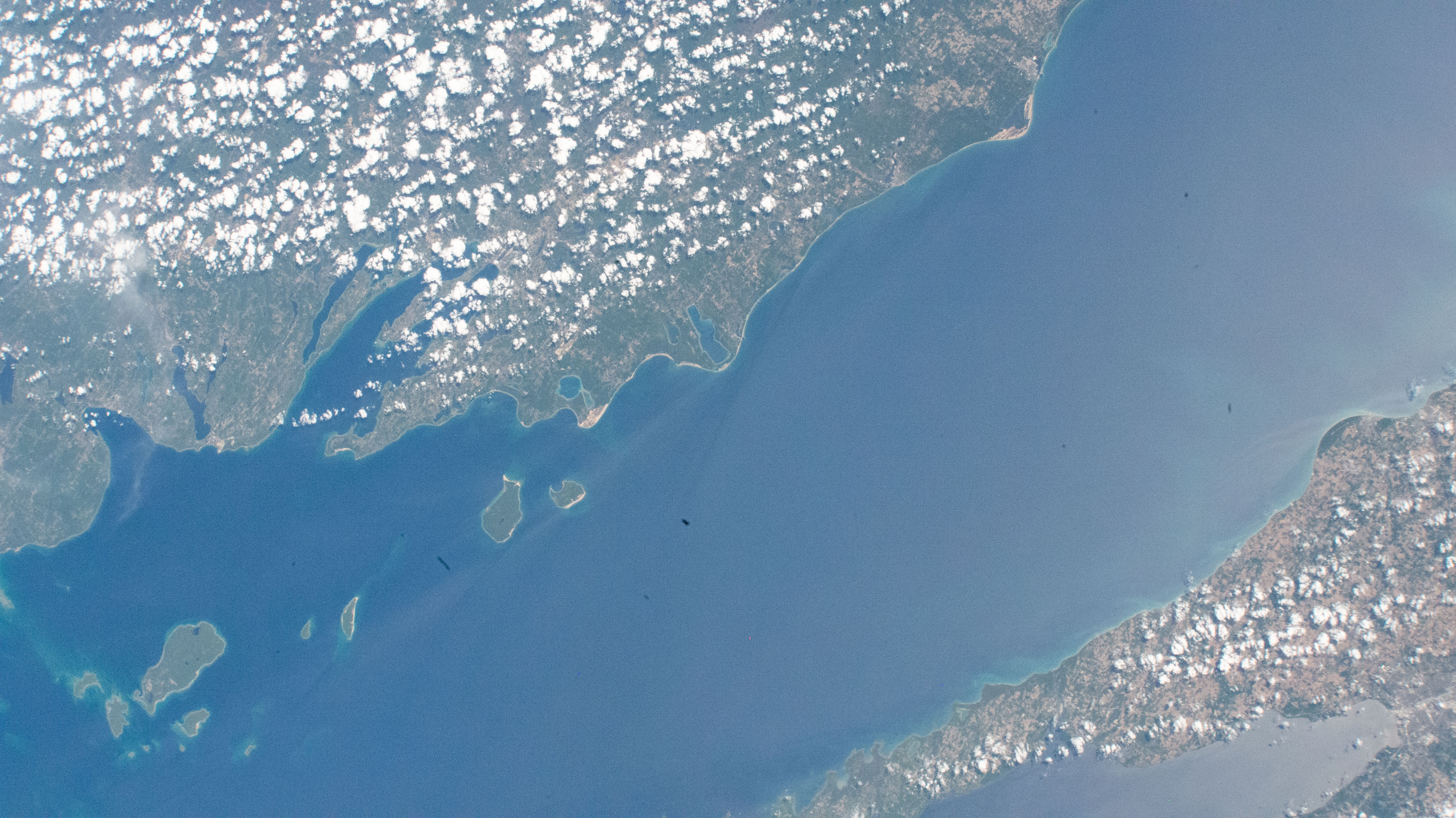
Beaver Islands (left), taken from the International Space Station; image is aligned with southeast at top
