= Feodor Protar =

American physician

Feodor Protar was a healer of Beaver Island in the U.S. state of Michigan. Born in 1837, he began to live on Beaver Island in 1893 and died in 1925.

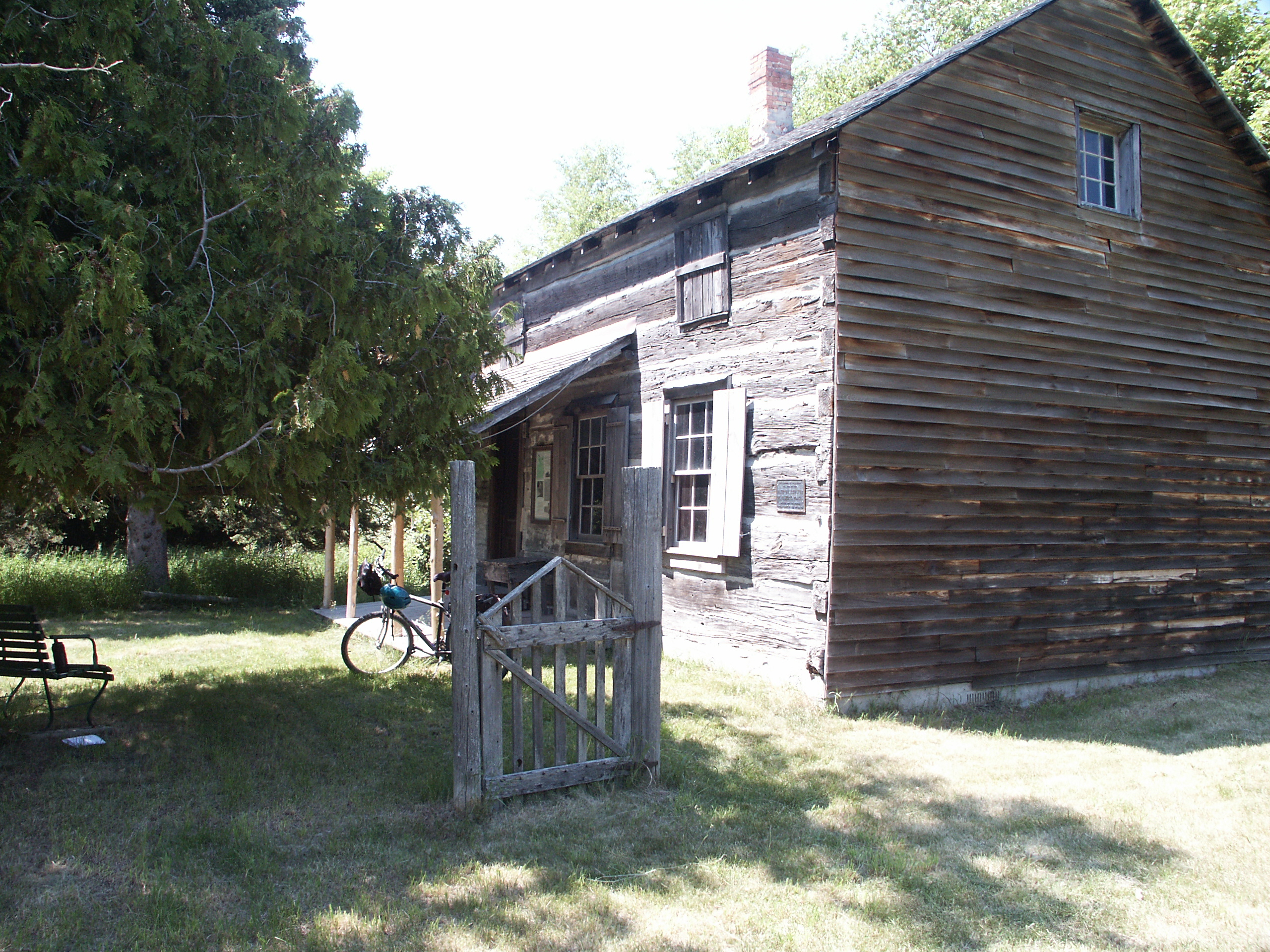
Protar's cabin and "doctor's office," where he lived from 1893 to 1925.

== Biography ==
Protar was born in what is now Tartu, Estonia, then part of the Russian Empire. His birth name was Friedrich Parrot. His date of birth is recorded as February 19, 1837. Parrot's family was part of the Baltic German nobility. In his early adult years, Parrot developed a successful acting career in the Germanosphere, performing for appreciative audiences in Dresden, Berlin, Riga and elsewhere in north and central Europe. Possibly because he ran afoul of House of Romanov's efforts for the Russification the Baltic provinces, Parrot emigrated to the United States in 1874, changing his family name to Protar. He worked a number of jobs, most of them in the theater. However, he eventually became a newspaper editor in Rock Island, Illinois.

In 1893, seeking solitude and an opportunity to get a fresh start in life, Protar established a home on Beaver Island, in northern Lake Michigan. He Russified his first name to Feodor and adopted a lifestyle inspired by the religious movement founded by Leo Tolstoy. He lived alone, sharing the isolated island with a small population of farmers, loggers and fishermen, most of whom were Irish-Americans with roots in County Donegal. Protar lived off the land as much as was possible, growing his own food, canning and drying it for sustenance during the long winters. His fellow islanders saw him as a benevolent, if eccentric, humanitarian and follower of a spiritual discipline inspired by Tolstoy.

Trained or self-taught in pharmacology, Protar was eventually pressured by his neighbors into practicing as an unlicensed physician. This was a skill of serious importance to the islanders in the early 1900s, as the technology of the time meant that Beaver Island was isolated from the mainland during the harsh winter months, and the island was not big enough to support a licensed physician.

Protar died in his Beaver Island cabin on March 3, 1925, apparently of a stroke. Islanders buried his body beside a boulder in the forest near his home that he was particularly fond of and erected a monumental enclosure around his grave, with a plaque expressing appreciation for his many years of service to the island community.

== Legacy ==
"Dr." Protar's life is celebrated by the Beaver Island Historical Society, which operates a small waterfront museum in St. James, the island's harbor. Protar's grave was built by local resident William McDonough.
