= Mackinac Island Airport =

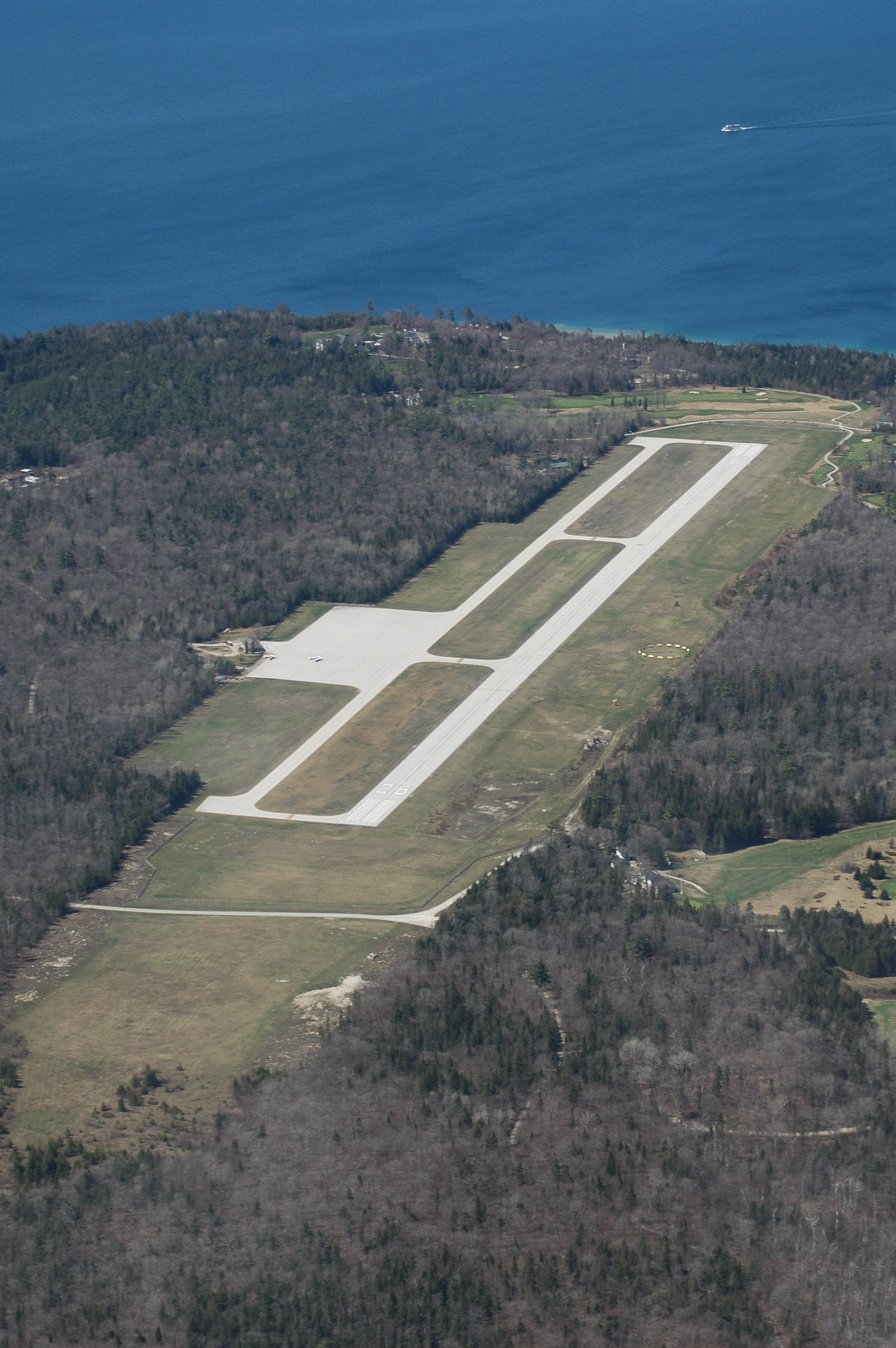
- Aerial view of Mackinac Island Airport as of May, 2007
- IATA: MCD; ICAO: KMCD; FAA LID: MCD

Summary
- Airport type: Public
- Owner: Mackinac Island State Park Commission
- Serves: Mackinac Island, Michigan
- Elevation AMSL: 739 ft (225 m)
- Coordinates: 45°51′54″N 084°38′14″W

Map
- Location of airport in Michigan MCD (the United States)

Runways
Direction	Length		Surface
Direction	ft	m	Surface
8/26	3,501	1,067	Concrete

Statistics
- Aircraft operations (2018): 11,100
- Based aircraft (2018): 1
- Source: Federal Aviation Administration
- Mackinac Island Airport
- U.S. National Historic Landmark District – Contributing property
- Part of: Mackinac Island (ID66000397)
- Added to NRHP: October 9, 1960

Mackinac Island Airport (IATA: MCD, ICAO: KMCD, FAA LID: MCD) is a public use airport in Mackinac County, Michigan, United States. It is located one nautical mile (1.9 km) northwest of downtown Mackinac Island, Michigan in the center of Mackinac Island. The airport is owned by Mackinac Island State Park Commission. It is included in the Federal Aviation Administration (FAA) National Plan of Integrated Airport Systems for 2017–2021, in which it is categorized as a basic general aviation facility.

== History ==
Mackinac Island Airport started as a grass strip in 1934. It got a paved runway in 1963 and a terminal building in 1969. A $4.6 million project in 2011-2012 moved the runway 65 feet east to a flatter location.

The airport received $30,000 from the US Department of Transportation in 2020 as part of the CARES Act to help mitigate the effects of the COVID-19 pandemic.

The aircraft has regularly scheduled passenger and cargo flights from Fresh Air Aviation. Great Lakes Air, which also served the airport, ceased operations in 2022.

== Facilities and aircraft ==
Mackinac Island Airport covers an area of 125 acres (51 ha) at an elevation of 739 feet (225 m) above mean sea level. It has one runway designated 8/26 with a concrete surface measuring 3,501 by 75 feet (1,067 x 23 m).

For the 12-month period ending December 31, 2018, the airport had 11,100 aircraft operations, with an average of 30 per day: 68% general aviation and 32% air taxi. In this period, there was only 1 aircraft reported based at the airport, a multi-engine aircraft.

The airport has a fixed-base operator with a crew lounge, but there is no fuel for sale.

- The airport is staffed September through May from 7:30AM until 5:30PM, and June through August from 8AM until 5PM.
- There is no fuel available at Mackinac Island Airport. The closest FBOs with fuel are in St. Ignace, Cheboygan, and Pellston.
- No camping is allowed on Mackinac Island, but nearby Bois Blanc island has an airstrip and allows camping at the field.
- Pilot Controlled Lighting is on 122.8, and UNICOM is on 122.7.
- The airport has MIRL lights and PAPI lights on each direction.

=== Island transit ===
- The airport is accessible by road from Annex Road, and is close to (but not directly accessible from) M-185, Michigan's only highway that prohibits vehicles. One special note is that no motorized vehicles with the exception of city emergency vehicles (police, fire and ambulance), city service vehicles and snowmobiles in winter are allowed on Mackinac Island. Travel on the island is accomplished on foot, bicycle, horse or horse-drawn carriage.
- Walking: The airport is about 1.6 miles by paved road from Market Street and the downtown area shops and restaurants.
- Taxi: The Mackinac Island Taxi Service (owned and operated by Carriage Tours) runs horse-drawn taxi carriages 24 hours a day from May to October, with limited hours from November to April.
- Bicycles: There are no bicycle rentals available at the airport, but there are several bicycle rental businesses downtown. Some private bikes can be stored in the racks outside the airport terminal.

== Airlines and destinations ==
Airlines	Destinations
Fresh Air Aviation	Charter: Beaver Island
Island Airways	Charter: Beaver Island–Welke

== Incidents and accidents ==
- On August 9, 2001, a Cessna P210 Centurion crashed while on approach to Mackinac Island. The pilot reported experiencing turbulence while in the traffic pattern. The stall horn sounded, so the pilot added power, but he was unable to remain clear of the trees around the airport. A witness reported the pilot's second approach appeared very low, and their turns were abnormal for the traffic pattern. The probable cause was found to be the pilot's failure to maintain proper glidepath during the landing approach resulting in the pilot not maintaining clearance from the trees.
- On December 3, 2011, a Great Lakes Air Piper PA-32-260 registered as N33315 crashed en route from St. Ignace, killing both passengers.
- In July and August 2013, a Cessna 172 and ERCO Ercoupe experienced weather issues on the runway, causing substantial damage to both aircraft.
- On February 26, 2018, a Piper PA 28 operated by Great Lakes Air was substantially damaged while landing at Mackinac Island. The pilot reported hearing a thud on approach, and the plane was reported to settle more than normal on landing. The pilot suspected a gear problem or blown tire and continued the landing; the plane settled further than normal and the right wing impacted the ground. The pilot maintained directional control with the rudder. It was found later that the right main landing gear had detached from the strut. The probable cause was found to be the improper reinstallation of the right main landing gear by maintenance personnel that resulted in the separation of the landing gear and the subsequent abnormal runway contact during the landing.
- On July 1, 2018, a Beech 58 aircraft overran the runway while rejecting a takeoff in which the airspeed indicator did not activate. The probable cause was found to be the pilot's failure to remove the pitot tube cover during the preflight inspection, which resulted in his delayed decision to reject the takeoff with insufficient runway remaining to safely stop the airplane.

== See also ==
- List of airports in Michigan
