= Hat Island (Lake Michigan) =

Island in Michigan, United States

- Location within Michigan

Geography
- Location: Lake Michigan
- Coordinates: 45°48′57″N 85°18′00″W
- Area: 10 acres (4.0 ha)
- Highest elevation: 584 ft (178 m)

Administration
- United States
- State: Michigan
- County: Charlevoix County
- Township: St. James Township

Demographics
- Population: Uninhabited

Hat Island is a small island on the eastern edge of the Beaver Island archipelago in Lake Michigan. It is about 10 acres (0.04 km^{2}) in size and located in eastern St. James Township, Charlevoix County, Michigan. It became part of the Michigan Islands National Wildlife Refuge in 1943.

Like other islands in the Michigan Islands NWR, Hat Island was formed during the Wisconsin glaciation when a melting glacier randomly dumped a large quantity of boulders and gravel in a spot that became part of the lakebed. The island was selected for inclusion in the Michigan Islands NMWR because of its standing as a potential breeding ground for herring gulls and other fish-eating birds.

During World War 2 it was used as a practice bombing site by the US Navy.

Hat Island is roughly four-sided, with an SSE-pointing forepeak that is said to look like the upturned brim of a hat.
