= Pismire Island =

Island in Charlevoix County, Michigan, United States of America

- Location within Michigan

Geography
- Location: Lake Michigan
- Coordinates: 45°46′06″N 85°26′43″W
- Area: 10,000 m^{2} (110,000 sq ft)
- Highest elevation: 581 ft (177.1 m)

Administration
- United States
- State: Michigan
- County: Charlevoix County
- Township: St. James Township

Demographics
- Population: Uninhabited

Pismire Island is a small island in Lake Michigan of approximately 2.5 acres (1.0 ha) in size. It is part of the Beaver Island archipelago, the Michigan Islands National Wildlife Refuge, and the Michigan Islands Wilderness Area. It is managed by the U.S. Fish and Wildlife Service as a satellite of the Seney National Wildlife Refuge. It is located in St. James Township, Charlevoix County, Michigan.

Lying approximately 4 miles (6.4 km) northeast of the harbor of St. James on Beaver Island, Pismire Island is a tiny triangle of glacial gravel. It contains almost no permanent vegetation and is best known as a breeding place for Lake Michigan birds. The island was preserved for public use as part of the creation of the Michigan Islands NWR in 1943, and was designated as wilderness in 1970.

The word pismire means ant, referring to the island's tiny size.
