= Charlevoix Municipal Airport =

Airport in Michigan, United States

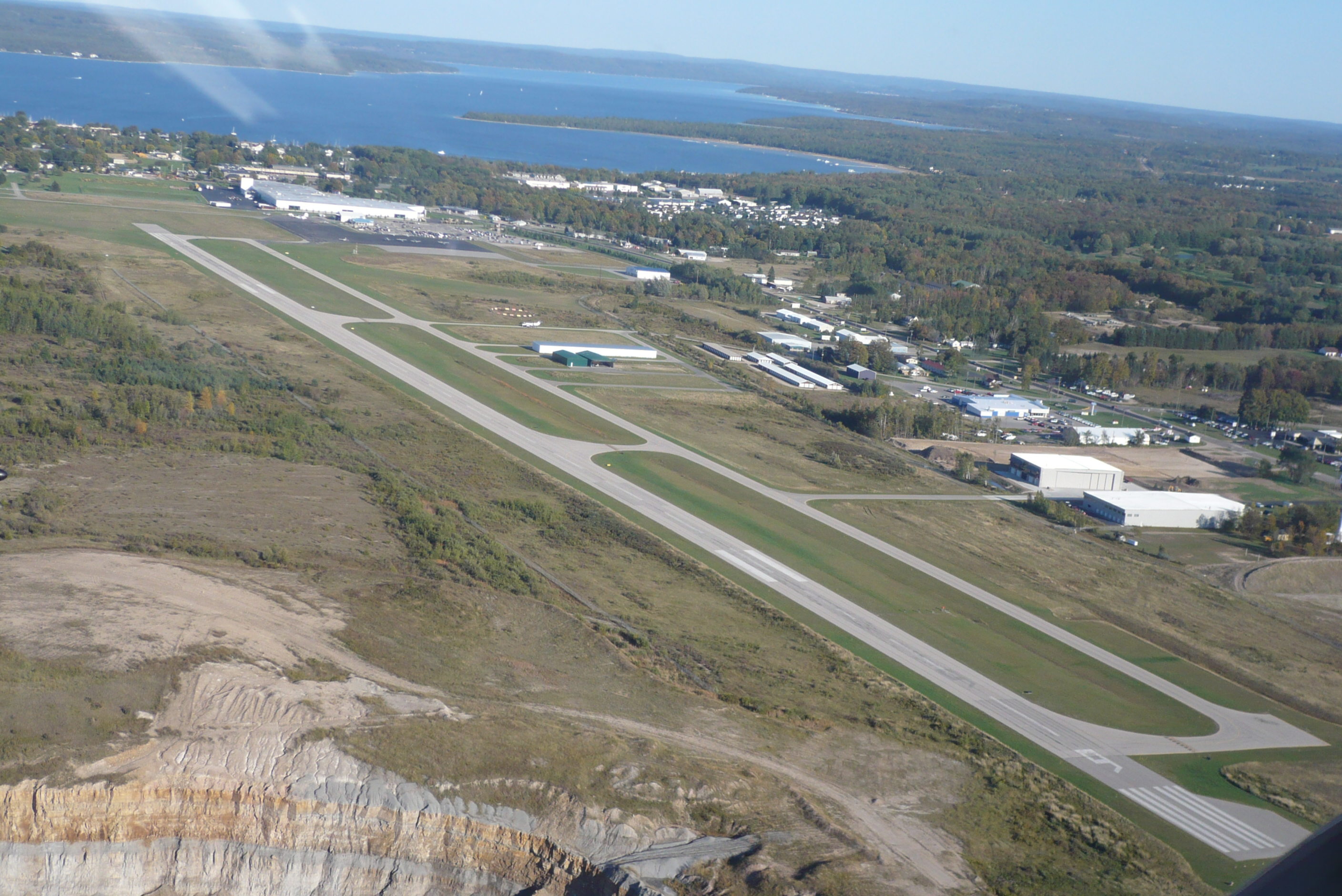
- Aerial view, September 2007
- IATA: none; ICAO: KCVX; FAA LID: CVX

Summary
- Airport type: Public
- Owner: City of Charlevoix
- Serves: Charlevoix, Michigan
- Elevation AMSL: 669 ft (204 m)
- Coordinates: 45°18′17″N 085°16′31″W
- Website: cityofcharlevoix.org/...

Maps
- Location of airport in Michigan
- Interactive map of Charlevoix Municipal Airport

Runways
Direction	Length		Surface
Direction	ft	m	Surface
4/22	1,280	390	Turf
9/27	4,550	1,387	Asphalt

Statistics (2018)
- Total enplanements: 16,852 ▲13%
- Aircraft operations (2018): 30,000
- Based aircraft (2018): 14
- Source: Federal Aviation Administration

Charlevoix Municipal Airport (ICAO: KCVX, FAA LID: CVX) is a city-owned, public-use airport located one nautical mile (2 km) southwest of the central business district of Charlevoix, a city in Charlevoix County, Michigan, United States. It is mostly used for general aviation, but also offers passenger service to Beaver Island via Island Airways and Fresh Air Aviation.

As per Federal Aviation Administration records, the airport had 17,854 passenger boardings (enplanements) in calendar year 2008, 15,427 enplanements in 2009, and 14,966 in 2010. It was included in the Federal Aviation Administration (FAA) National Plan of Integrated Airport Systems for 2017–2021, in which it was categorized as a non- primary commercial service facility.

Although most U.S. airports use the same three-letter location identifier for both the FAA and IATA, Charlevoix Municipal Airport is assigned CVX by the FAA, but has no IATA designation.

== Facilities and aircraft ==
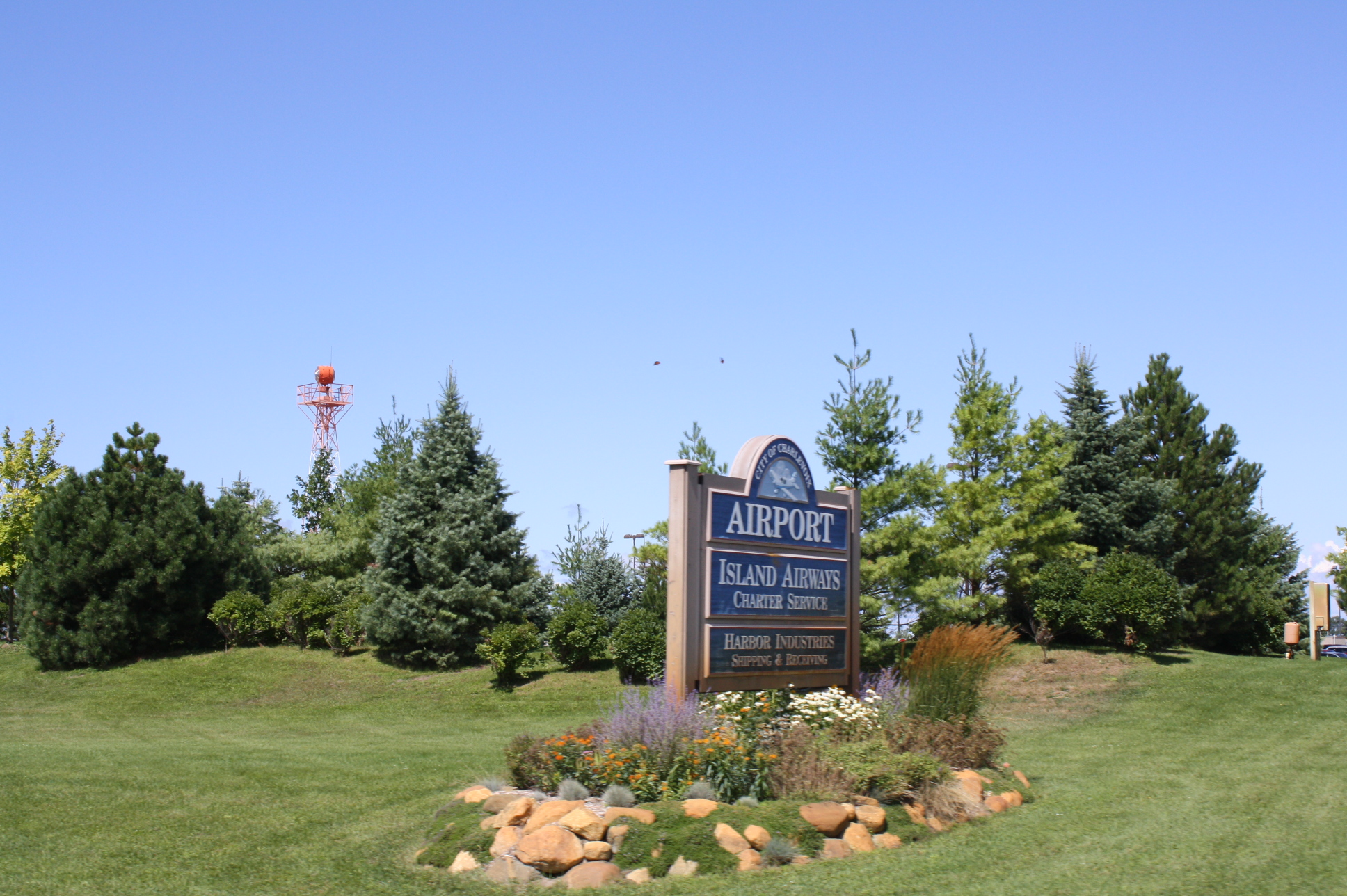
Airport sign

Charlevoix Municipal Airport covers an area of 185 acres (75 ha) at an elevation of 669 feet (204 m) above mean sea level. It has two runways: 9/27 is 4,550 by 75 feet (1,387 x 23 m) with an asphalt surface and 4/22 is 1,280 by 200 feet (390 x 61 m) with a turf surface.

The airport has a city-run fixed-base operator that offers fuel, general maintenance, a crew lounge, a conference room, and more. An expanded fuel farm became operational at the airport in 2022 to accommodate a sharp increase in traffic.

For the 12-month period ending December 31, 2018, the airport had 30,000 aircraft operations, an average of 82 per day: 59% general aviation, 40% air taxi, and 2% military. At that time there were 18 aircraft based at this airport: 11 single-engine and 5 multi-engine airplanes as well as two jets.

== Airlines and destinations ==
Airlines	Destinations
Fresh Air Aviation	Beaver Island
Island Airways	Beaver Island–Welke

== Accidents and incidents ==
- On February 2, 2001, a Piper PA-34 Seneca collided with a runway light and snowbank while attempting to land in Charlevoix. The pilot reported that, during the landing roll, the aircraft veered right because there was too much aileron into the right crosswind. The pilot neutralized the controls, at which point the aircraft's left wing was lifted before the whole plane veered left, sliding over ice and into the snow bank. The probable cause was found to be that the pilot failed to maintain directional control of the airplane due to inadequate compensation for the wind conditions.
- On June 24, 2011, a Beechcraft Bonanza crashed into a garage in Charlevoix while attempting to land at the airport. Authorities found the aircraft had stalled due to inadequate airspeed during an improper instrument approach procedure.
- On September 13, 2019, a plane crash-landed at Charlevoix Municipal after having problems with its landing gear following a flight from Beaver Island. None of the nine aboard were injured.

== See also ==
- List of airports in Michigan
