= La Pointe Indian Cemetery =

Historic cemetery on Madeline Island

- U.S. National Register of Historic Places
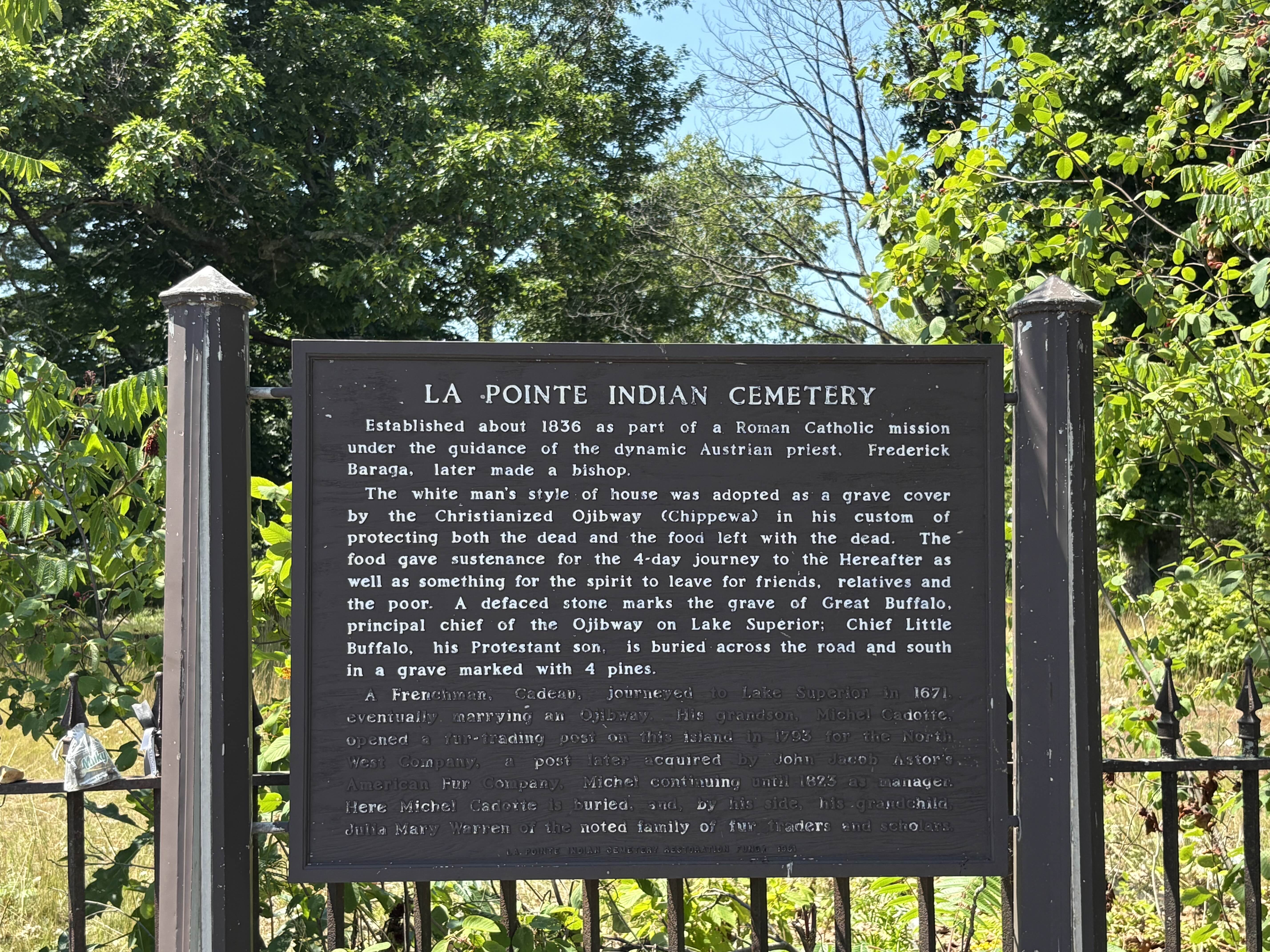
- Sign in front of the cemetery
- Location: S. Old Main St. La Pointe, Wisconsin
- Built: 1836
- NRHP reference No.: 77001665
- Added to NRHP: August 3, 1977

La Pointe Indian Cemetery (also called St. Joseph Mission Cemetery) is a historic cemetery in the town of La Pointe on Madeline Island, Wisconsin. Established as part of Frederic Baraga's Catholic mission on the island, it was used for burial from 1836 to 1948. It was added to the National Register of Historic Places in 1977.

== History ==
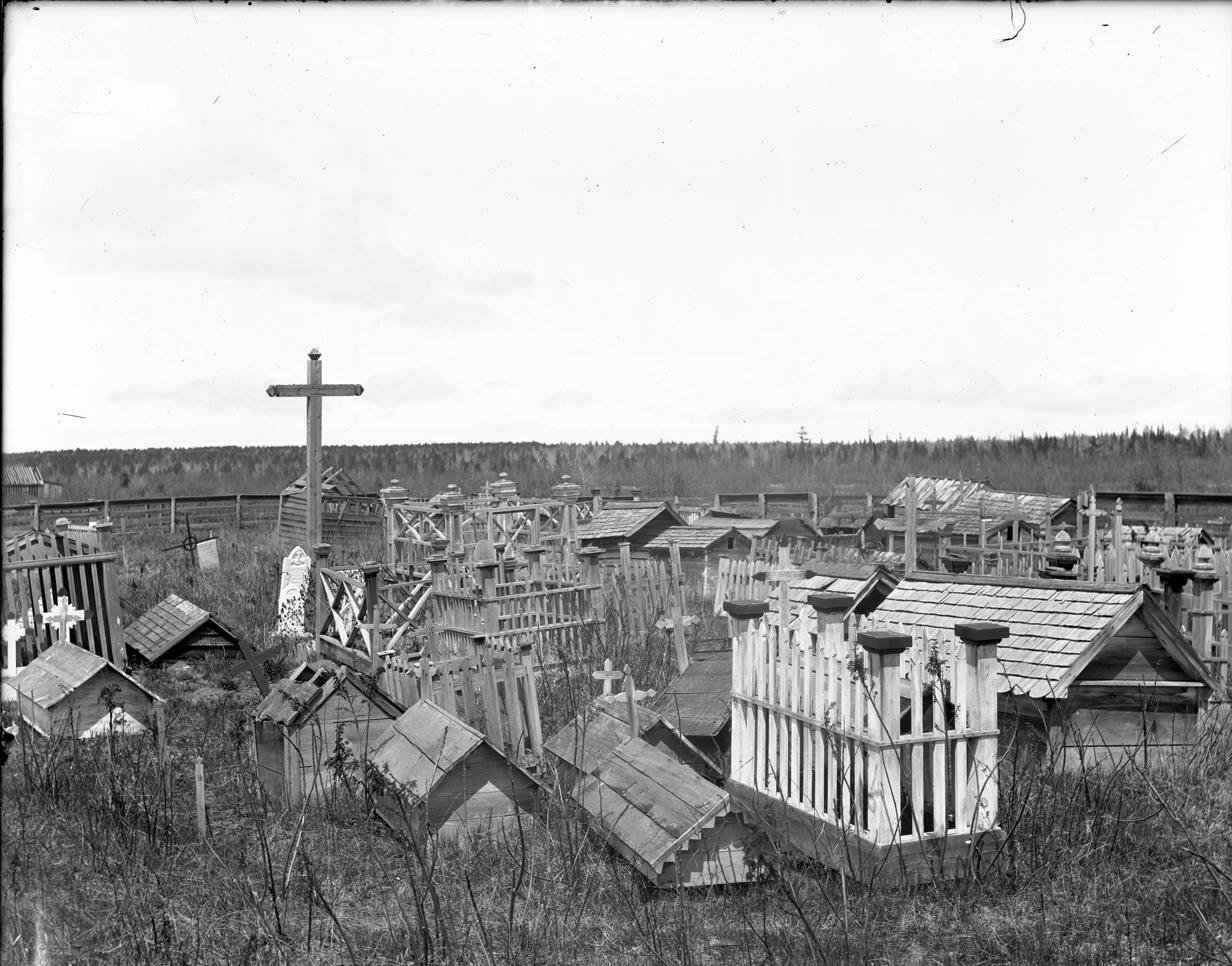
The cemetery in 1907

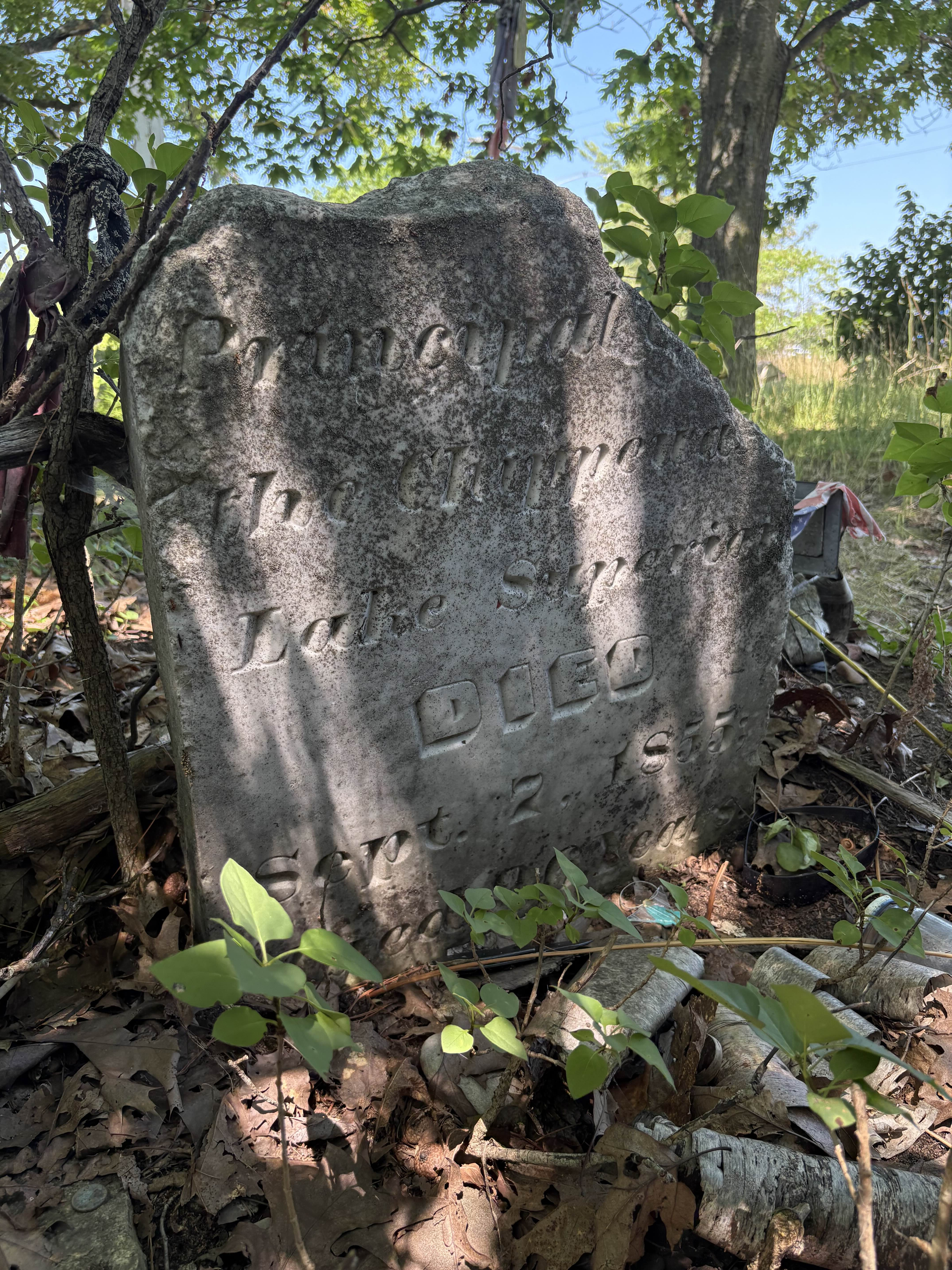
Grave of Kechewaishke (Chief Great Buffalo)

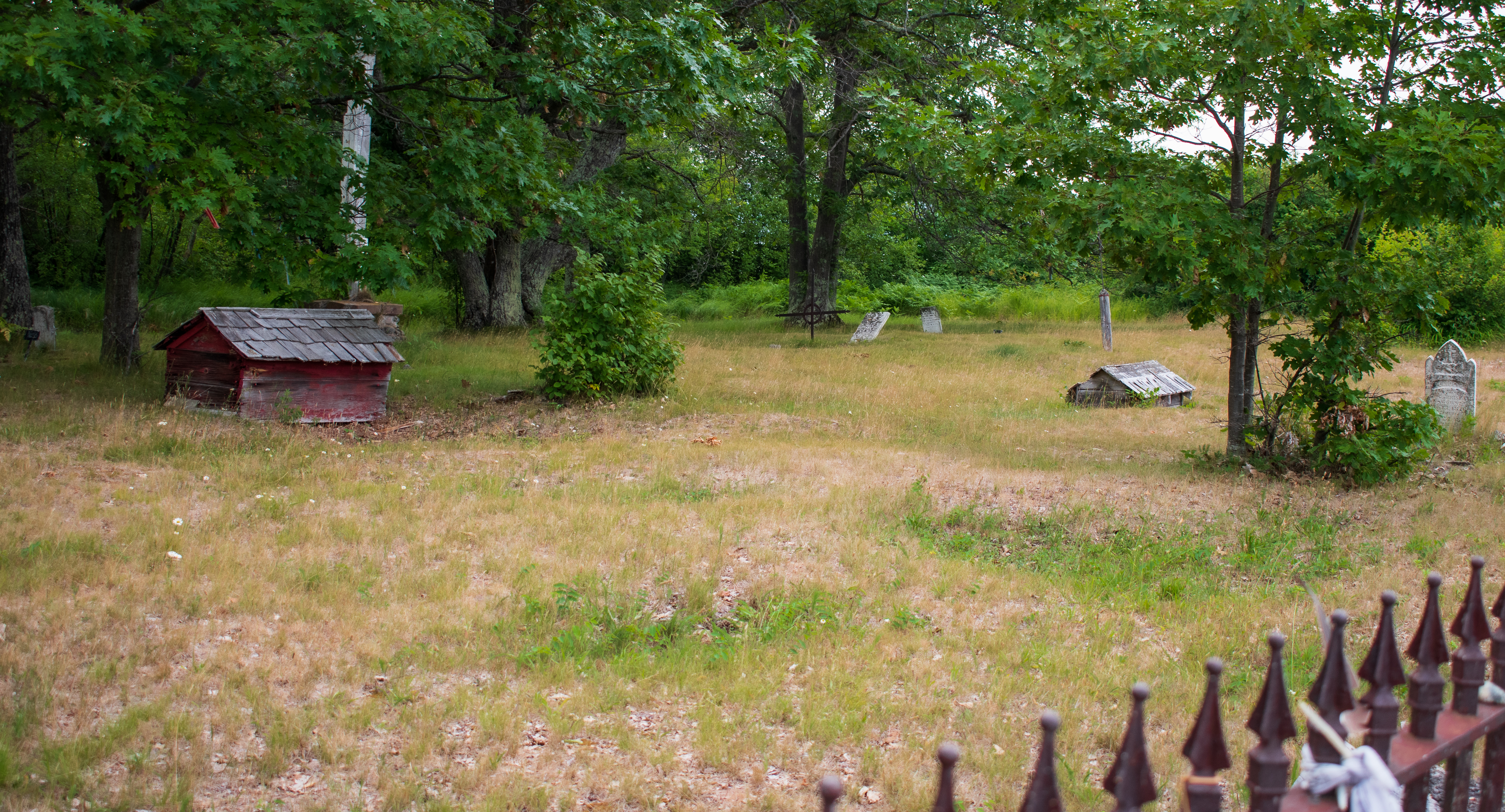
La Pointe Indian Cemetery, 2021

La Pointe Indian Cemetery was established in 1836 as part of the Catholic mission on Madeline Island, which had been founded in 1835 by Austrian Slovene priest Frederic Baraga. The cemetery is located about 100 feet from the original site of the mission. Near the cemetery and former mission is the site of an 18th-century Ojibwe village and cemetery. The "Marina site", which also contains evidence of prehistoric occupation and an early 18th-century French trading post, was discovered and partially excavated in the 1970s.

After about 1910 there were few burials in the cemetery, with the final taking place in 1948. In 1973, the Catholic Diocese of Superior transferred ownership of the site to the federal government to be held in trust for the Bad River Chippewa. It is governed by the Bad River tribal council and in the jurisdiction of the Great Lakes Agency of the Bureau of Indian Affairs. In 1977, the cemetery was listed on the National Register of Historic Places.

== Burials ==
Some of the graves are covered by small wooden structures known as "spirit houses" or "gravehouses", which are intended to protect the dead while their spirit traveled to Gigig (heaven). Traditionally, food would be left in the houses as offerings. The Ojibwe spirit house practice probably derives from French influence. The La Pointe Indian Cemetery is the only cemetery in the United States with a significant number of surviving original grave houses.

All of those interred in the cemetery are of full or partial indigenous heritage. There are a number of historical figures buried in the Indian Cemetery, including:

- Kechewaishke (1759-1855), also known as Great Buffalo or Bezhike, an Ojibwe chief who signed the Treaties of La Pointe which established the Red Cliff and Bad River reservations
- Michel Cadotte (1764-1837), Métis fur trader (Note: Cadotte's wife Equaysayway, baptized as Madeline and the namesake of the island, is not buried in the cemetery. Her grave is probably somewhere else on Madeline Island.)
- William Wilson, for whom the nearby Hermit Island was previously named (Note: Wilson had lost a fisticuffs match against local fur trader John W. Bell, and as a result left La Pointe and settled alone on Hermit Island. Wilson lived there until his death in 1861. His grave in the cemetery is unmarked.)
- William Neveaux, an Ojibwe soldier who served in Company K of the 1st Michigan Sharpshooters during the Civil War

Across the road from the Indian Cemetery is the singular grave of Great Buffalo's son, Little Buffalo. Little Buffalo had been raised Catholic, but became Protestant later in life, and died in 1853. His grave is marked by four pine trees.

== See also ==
- Garden Island Indian Cemetery
