= Garden Island Indian Cemetery =

Archaeological site in Michigan, United States

- U.S. National Register of Historic Places
- Michigan State Historic Site
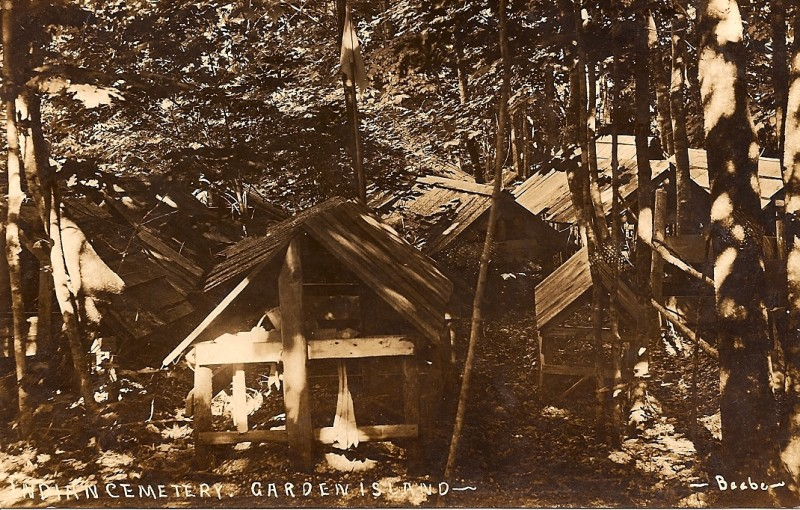
- Spirit houses, c. 1910

- Location within Michigan Location within the United States
- Interactive map
- Location: Garden Island
- Coordinates: 45°48′10″N 85°30′30″W
- Area: 7 acres (2.8 ha)
- Built: 1851
- Architectural style: "Spirit houses"
- NRHP reference No.: 78001494

Significant dates
- Added to NRHP: February 17, 1978
- Designated MSHS: July 26, 1973

The Garden Island Indian Cemetery, also designated 20CX12, is an archaeological site and Ojibwe burial site located on Garden Island in Charlevoix County, Michigan, United States. It was listed on the National Register of Historic Places in 1978.

It holds about 3500 graves, and has been called the largest Indian cemetery in the United States. Spirit houses mark some graves, headstones mark others, and the older graves are unmarked. Most graves date from 1851 to 1935.

== See also ==
- La Pointe Indian Cemetery
