= Spirit house (Ojibwe) =

Ojibwe funerary structure

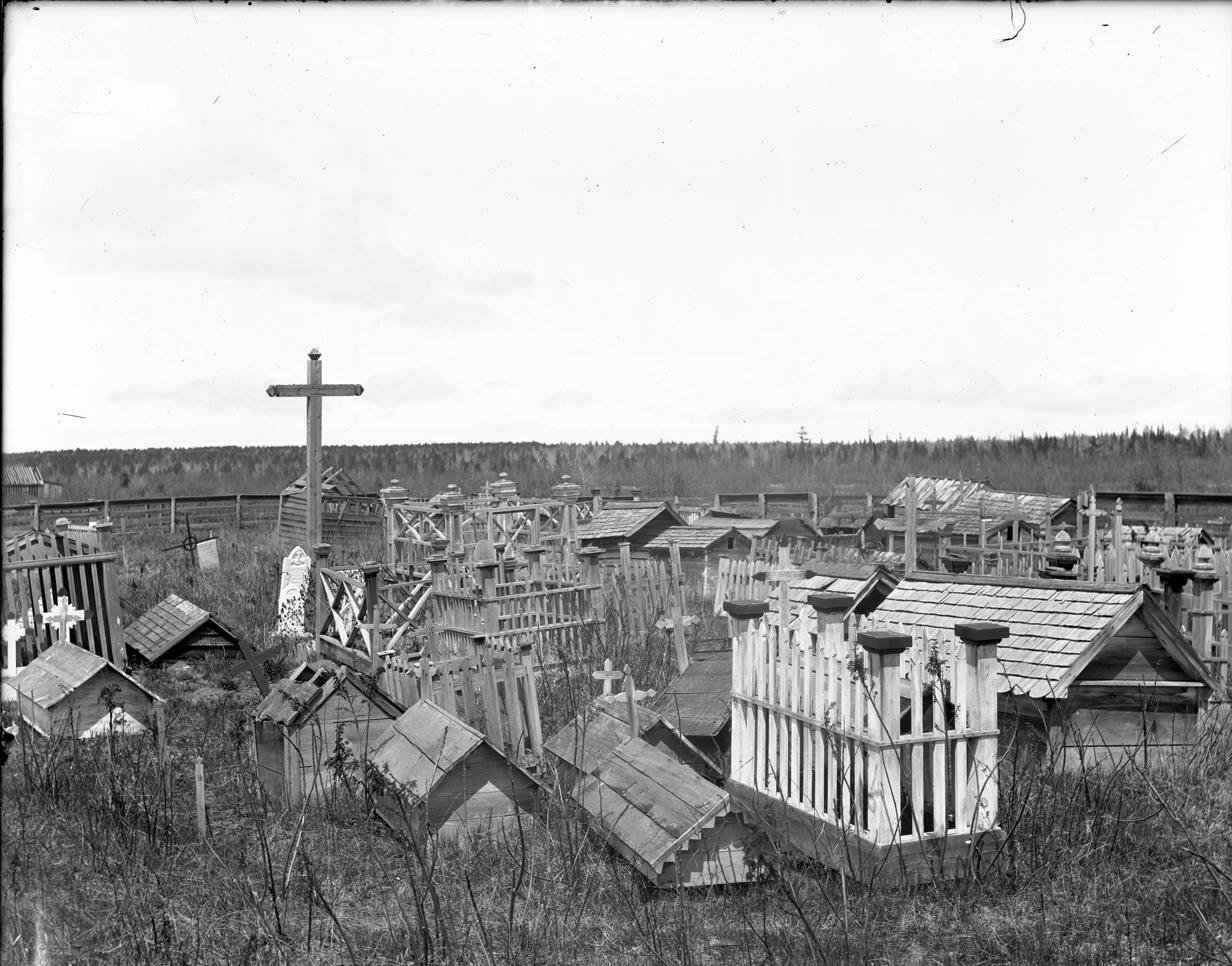
Spirit houses of La Pointe Indian Cemetery, 1907

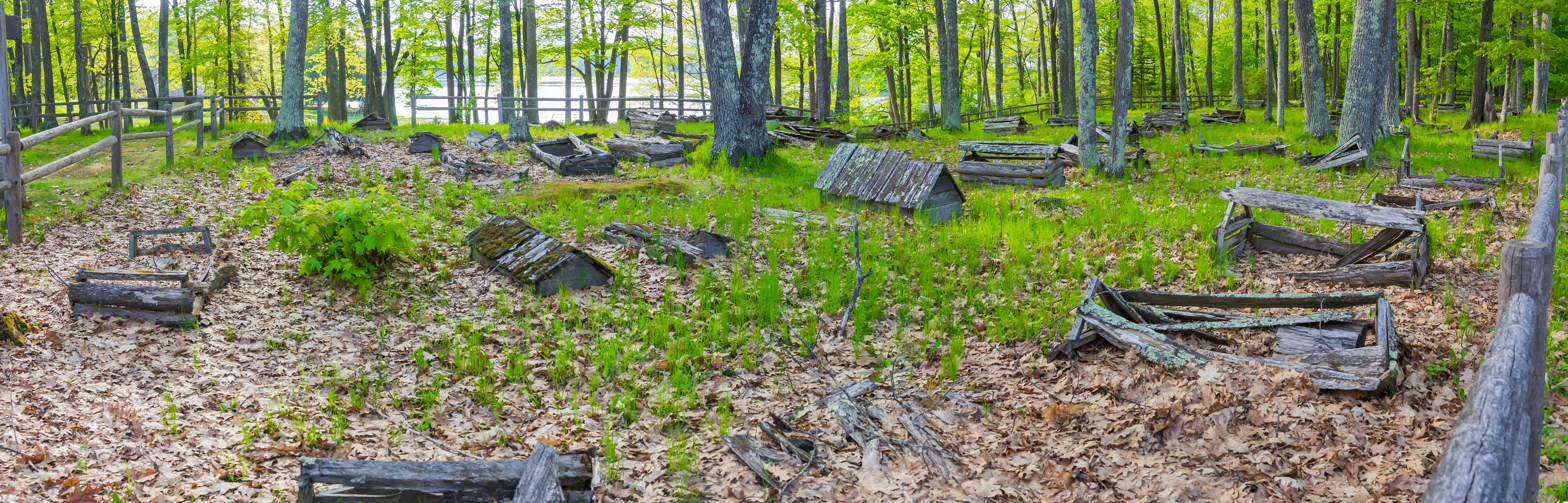
Spirit houses in an Ojibwe cemetery in Iron County, Michigan

A spirit house (Ojibwe: jiibegamig), also called a gravehouse, is a structure traditionally erected over graves as part of Ojibwe funeral rites. The structure consists of a small gable-roofed box, which functions to protect the grave as well as facilitate the soul's journey to Heaven (Ojibwe: Gigig). They have an opening and an interior ledge on one side where food (particularly maple syrup, maple sugar, wild rice, and fruit) and tobacco is placed. The food could be consumed by family and friends of the deceased, community members in need, and children. Birch bark was used to construct the spirit houses before lumber. The grave is traditionally oriented along the east-west axis.

Spirit houses are possibly derived from French Christian influence.

Cemeteries with significant numbers of spirit houses include the La Pointe Indian Cemetery and Buffalo Bill Cemetery at Powers Bluff in Wisconsin, and Garden Island Indian Cemetery in Michigan.
