= Mormon Print Shop =

- U.S. National Register of Historic Places
- Michigan State Historic Site
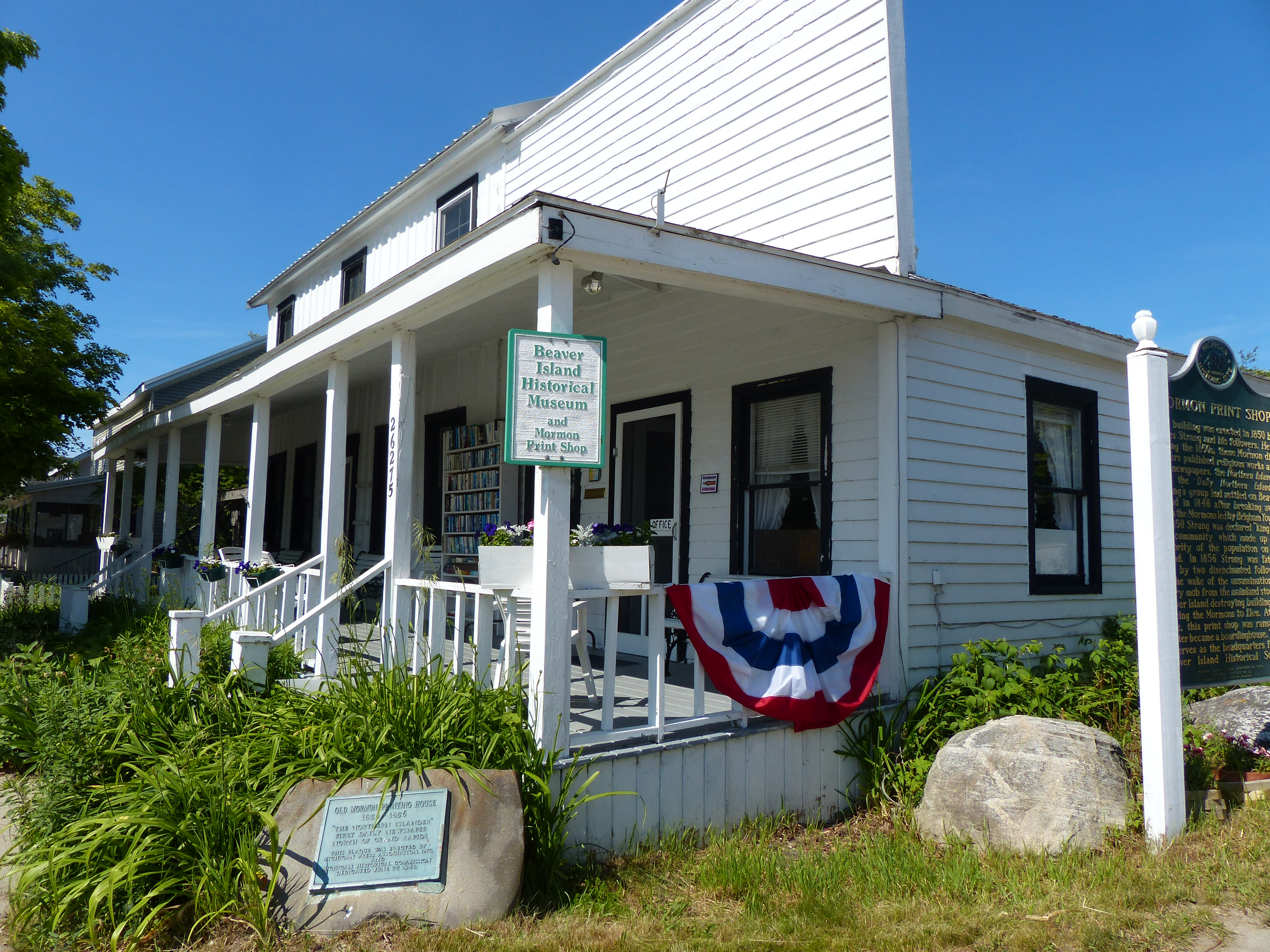

- Location within Michigan Location within the United States
- Interactive map
- Location: Main and Forest Sts., St. James, Michigan
- Coordinates: 45°44′46″N 85°31′16″W
- Area: less than one acre
- Built: 1850
- NRHP reference No.: 71000386
- Added to NRHP: January 25, 1971

The Mormon Print Shop is a commercial building located at the corner of Main and Forest Streets in St. James, Michigan, on Beaver Island. It was listed on the National Register of Historic Places in 1971. As of 2017, it is used by the Beaver Island Historical Society as a historical museum, the Old Mormon Print Shop Museum.

== History ==
After the death of Joseph Smith in 1844, James Strang founded the Church of Jesus Christ of Latter Day Saints (Strangite), a faction of the Latter Day Saint movement (i.e. the Mormons) that he claimed to be the sole legitimate continuation of the Church. In 1847, Strang and some of his followers moved to the then largely uninhabited Beaver Island. The colony of St. James quickly grew, and by 1850, there were several thousand people in the Beaver Islands, most of them Mormon.

In 1850, Strang and his followers constructed this building as a print shop. On December 12 of that year they printed the first issue of the Northern Islander, one of the earliest papers published in northern Michigan. It was published first as a weekly, and later as a daily, and carried both general news and columns dealing with the religious ideas of Strang. The shop was also used to print books.

Strang, however, had made many enemies, and in June 1856 he was shot, dying a few weeks later. Shortly after Strang's shooting, Beaver Island was invaded by a mob of non-Mormons from the mainland portion of Michigan, who sacked many of the buildings and forcibly evicted the residents. The mob took control of the print shop, and issued an edition of the Northern Islander listing their grievances.

In later years, the print shop became a boarding house owned by a Mrs. Gibson. It was later purchased by the Beaver Island Historical Society, who use the building as a historical museum, the Old Mormon Print Shop Museum. Plans are underway to expand the building.

== Description ==
The Mormon Print Shop is a two-story building with a gable roof measuring approximately 30 feet wide by 20 feet deep. A single-story addition measuring 19 feet wide is attached to the rear of the building. It is constructed the shop is built from squared logs covered with vertical board and batten. The foundation originally consisted of cedar posts sunk into the ground, but these deteriorated and were replaced by cement blocks.
