= Shoe Island (Lake Michigan) =

Island in Charlevoix County, Michigan, United States

- Location within Michigan

Geography
- Location: Lake Michigan
- Coordinates: 45°48′25″N 85°17′52″W
- Area: 3 acres (1.2 ha)
- Highest elevation: 581 ft (177.1 m)

Administration
- United States
- State: Michigan
- County: Charlevoix County
- Township: St. James Township

Demographics
- Population: Uninhabited

Shoe Island is a small island or islet in the Beaver Island archipelago in Lake Michigan. It is about 3 acres (1.2 ha) in size and located in eastern St. James Township, Charlevoix County, Michigan. It became part of the Michigan Islands National Wildlife Refuge in 1943, and was designated as part of the Michigan Islands Wilderness Area in 1970.

Like several other components of the Michigan Islands NWR, Shoe Island was formed during the Wisconsin glaciation. Geologically, it is a heap of boulders and gravel left behind by a retreating glacier. Islets of this type form good nesting places for freshwater seabirds.
