= Beaver Island Airport =

Airport in Michigan, United States

- IATA: none; ICAO: KSJX; FAA LID: SJX

Summary
- Airport type: Public
- Owner: St. James & Peaine Townships
- Serves: Beaver Island, Michigan
- Elevation AMSL: 670 ft (200 m)
- Coordinates: 45°41′32″N 085°33′59″W

Map
- Location of airport in Michigan

Runways
Direction	Length		Surface
Direction	ft	m	Surface
5/23	2,054	626	Turf
9/27	4,299	1,310	Asphalt
14/32	3,278	999	Turf

Statistics (2019)
- Aircraft operations: 9,210
- Source: Federal Aviation Administration

Beaver Island Airport (ICAO: KSJX, FAA LID: SJX) is a public use airport located on Beaver Island in Charlevoix County, Michigan, United States. It is owned by St. James Township and Peaine Township. It is included in the Federal Aviation Administration (FAA) National Plan of Integrated Airport Systems for 2017–2021, in which it is categorized as a local general aviation facility.

Although many U.S. airports use the same three-letter location identifier for the FAA and IATA, this airport is assigned SJX by the FAA and no designation from the IATA (which assigned SJX to Sarteneja Airport in Sarteneja, Belize).

The airport received a $20,000 federal grant in 2020 as part of the CARES Act. The grant came in response to the COVID-19 pandemic to help the airport continue operations and upgrade facilities.

== Facilities and aircraft ==
Beaver Island Airport covers an area of 130 acres (53 ha) at an elevation of 670 feet (200 m) above mean sea level. It has three runways: 9/27 has an asphalt pavement measuring 4,299 by 75 feet (1,310 m × 23 m); 14/32 and 5/23 have turf surfaces measuring 3,278 by 120 feet (999 m × 37 m) and 2,054 by 120 feet (626 m × 37 m) respectively. Runways 14/32 and 5/23 are closed November through April, and also when snow-covered. Access to the airport is via Donnell Mor's Lane.

For the 12-month period ending December 31, 2019, the airport had 9,210 aircraft operations, an average of 25 per day: 60% air taxi and 40% general aviation. There are no aircraft currently based on the field.

The airport has a fixed-base operator that offers fuel, conference rooms, a crew lounge, and more.

== Airlines and destinations ==
Airlines	Destinations
Fresh Air Aviation	Charlevoix; Charter: Mackinac Island

== Accidents and incidents ==
- In 1988, an airplane crashed off this location.
- On February 8, 2001, a Swearingen SA227 "Merlin" plane owned by Northern Illinois Flight Center that was landing from Chicago disappeared for 15 hours. Paul Welke, the owner of Island Airways, then flew as part of the rescue operation, finding 42 year old Mirth Gault and her children, ages 13, 9 and 5, alive next to the crashed aircraft debris. The crash killed both crew members.

== See also ==
- List of airports in Michigan
