= Trout Island (Michigan) =

Island in Lake Michigan

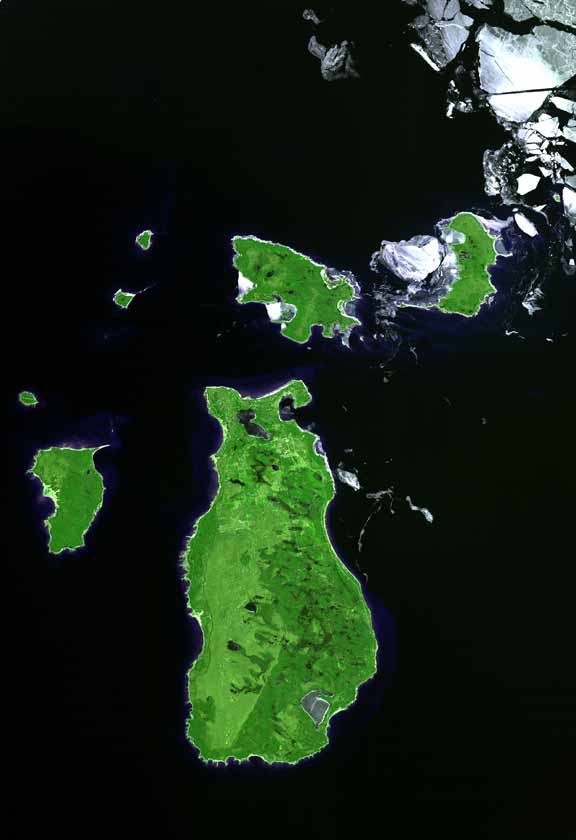
- Trout Island is the small island on the far left.

- Location within Michigan Location within the United States

Geography
- Location: Lake Michigan
- Coordinates: 45.7719416°N 85.6903683°W
- Area: 80 acres (32 ha)
- Highest elevation: 594 ft (181.1 m)

Administration
- United States
- State: Michigan
- County: Charlevoix County
- Township: St. James Township

Trout Island is an island in Lake Michigan and is part of the Beaver Island archipelago. The island is 80 acres in size, and is privately owned. There is an airstrip on the island that extends across the whole island to both shorelines. Trout Island is a little under two miles from High Island, and a little over six miles from Beaver Island. The island is part of the Beaver Island Archipelago.
