= Scarecrow Island =

- Location within Michigan

Geography
- Location: Lake Huron
- Coordinates: 44°54′42″N 83°19′44″W
- Area: 28,000 m^{2} (300,000 sq ft)

Administration
- United States
- State: Michigan
- County: Alpena County
- Township: Sanborn Township

Demographics
- Population: Uninhabited

Scarecrow Island is a small, 7-acre (0.03-km^{2}) island in Lake Huron. It forms the southern limit of Thunder Bay and helps define the harbor of Alpena, Michigan. It is part of Sanborn Township, in Alpena County, Michigan.

In recognition of Scarecrow Island's importance as a traditional nesting site for colonial waterbirds such as cormorants, herons, gulls, and terns, it received protection as one of eight islands in the Michigan Islands National Wildlife Refuge in 1943. In 1970, it was designated as one of three islands in the Michigan Islands Wilderness. The island is administered as a satellite of the Shiawassee National Wildlife Refuge. Adjacent waters of Thunder Bay became part of the Thunder Bay National Marine Sanctuary in 2000.

Located off Hardwood Point, Scarecrow Island is situated in the center of a region rich in fish. A 2002 study conducted the U.S. Fish and Wildlife Service documented the occurrence of seven species of fish in the immediate vicinity of the island, with round whitefish, trout-perch, and lake chub predominating.

Like many other islands in the Great Lakes, Scarecrow Island is a relict of the Wisconsin glacial period. A melting Ice Age glacier dumped a large quantity of rocks and gravel onto a gouged-out surface that became part of the bed of Lake Huron.
