= Gull Island (Charlevoix County, Michigan) =

Island in Charlevoix County, Michigan, United States

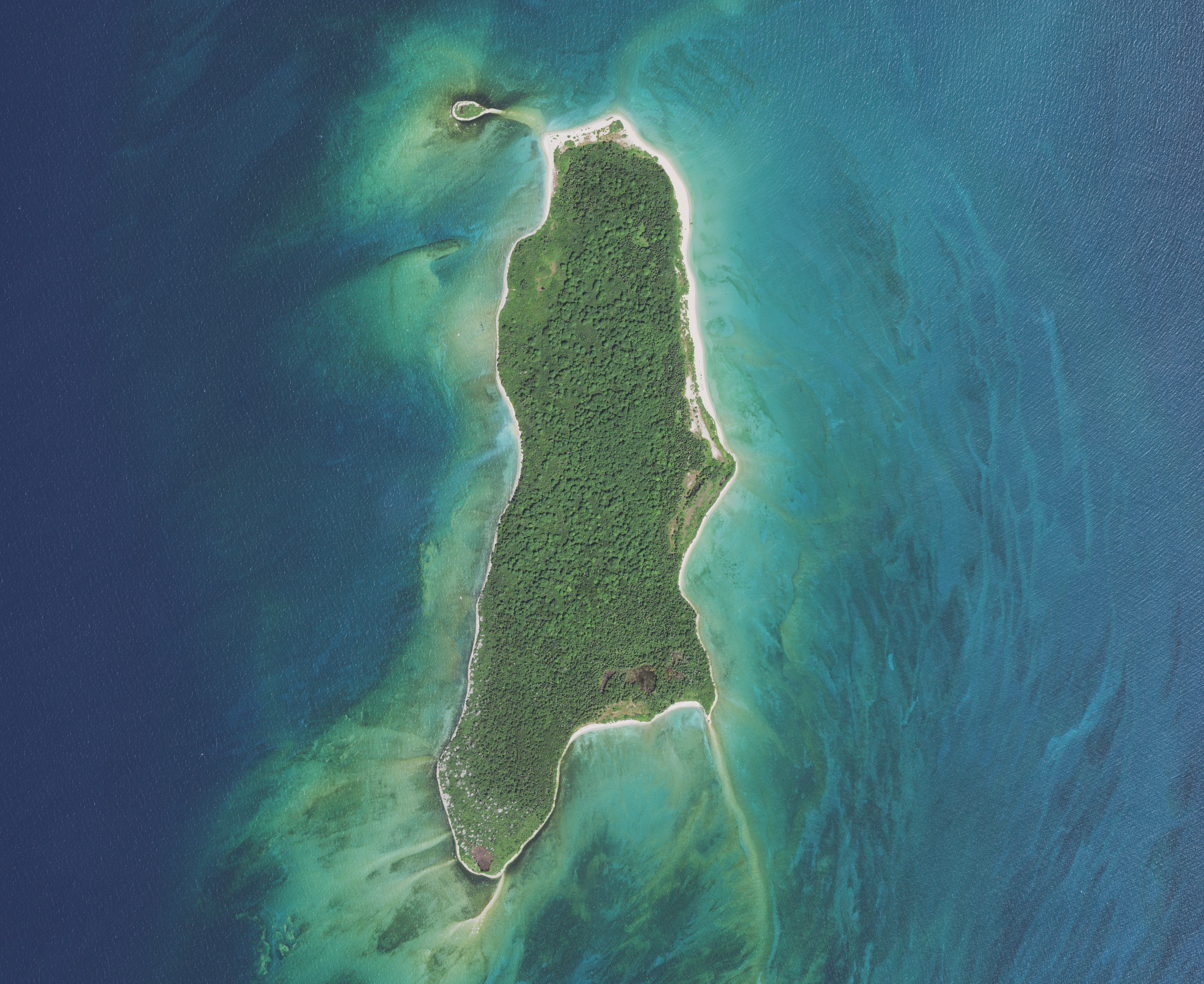
- An aerial photograph from July 28, 2020

- Location within Michigan

Geography
- Location: Lake Michigan
- Coordinates: 45°42′09″N 85°50′19″W
- Area: 230 acres (93 ha)
- Highest elevation: 604 ft (184.1 m)

Administration
- United States
- State: Michigan
- County: Charlevoix County
- Township: St. James Township

Demographics
- Population: Uninhabited

Gull Island, located in St. James Township, Charlevoix County, Michigan, is the largest of approximately one dozen islands bearing this name in Michigan. 230 acres (0.9 km^{2}) in size, it is managed by the U.S. Fish and Wildlife Service as part of the Michigan Islands National Wildlife Refuge. The refuge was created in 1943.

Relatively isolated, Gull Island is located 7 miles (11 km) west of High Island (Michigan), which is itself uninhabited. It is the largest of the four Lake Michigan islands in the Michigan Islands NWR, and the only one to have a substantial forest ecosystem. Balsam fir and northern whitecedar grow in the island's humid, boreal climate. Gull Island also has beaches and sand dunes on its north and east sides.

Gull Island, like the other Lake Michigan islands within the Michigan Islands NWR, is managed as a satellite refuge of the Seney National Wildlife Refuge.

On November 18, 1958, the SS Carl D. Bradley, a cargo vessel that specialized in the transport of limestone for steel mills, foundered and sank 12 miles southwest of Gull Island. The incident included the loss of 33 of the 35 men aboard.
