= Michigan Islands National Wildlife Refuge =

Protected area in Michigan, United States

- IUCN category IV (habitat/species management area)
- Interactive map of Michigan Islands National Wildlife Refuge
- Location: Lake Michigan: Gull, Hat, Pismire, and Shoe islands Lake Huron: Charity, Little Charity, Scarecrow, and Thunder Bay islands
- Area: 744.39 acres (3.0124 km^{2})
- Established: 1943
- Governing body: U.S. Fish and Wildlife Service
- Website: Michigan Islands National Wildlife Refuge

Michigan Islands National Wildlife Refuge

The Michigan Islands National Wildlife Refuge is a designation for nine Michigan islands in the North American Great Lakes. Owned by the United States federal government, they were set aside for ecosystem protection purposes by President Franklin D. Roosevelt 1943.

Charity, Little Charity, Scarecrow, Crooked, and Sugar islands form the Lake Huron division of the refuge. Gull, Hat, Pismire, and Shoe islands, which are part of the Beaver Island archipelago, form the Lake Michigan division.

No single one of them is large enough to rate a full-time site staff from the U.S. Fish and Wildlife Service, and they are widely separated from each other in two separate Great Lakes. In an unusual administrative decision, the Fish and Wildlife Service, as of 2007, has divided up management responsibilities over the Michigan Islands NWR between two larger, full-time-staffed wildlife refuges. The four Lake Huron islands are managed by Shiawasee National Wildlife Refuge, based in Saginaw, Michigan, and the four Lake Michigan islands are managed by Seney National Wildlife Refuge, based in Seney, Michigan. Scarecrow and Thunder Bay islands were also designated part of the Thunder Bay National Marine Sanctuary.

The Michigan Islands National Wildlife Refuge islands were set aside as resting places for migratory birds flying over the Great Lakes, but have drawn increased attention in the following decades for their Great Lakes ecosystem plant life, including the Dwarf Lake Iris, the state wildflower of Michigan, and Pitcher's thistle, both classified as threatened species within the United States.

There are automated lighthouses on Charity and Thunder Bay Islands.

== Michigan Islands Wilderness ==
Pismire, Scarecrow, and Shoe islands were designated as wilderness in 1970. The three islands totaling 12.5 acres (0.05 km^{2}) make up the Michigan Islands Wilderness Area.
