= Elizabeth Baldwin Garland =

American archaeologist (1930–2020)

- Born: May 5, 1930; Long Island, New York, U.S.
- Died: March 31, 2020 (aged 89)
- Education: Wellesley College; Radcliffe College; Harvard University
- Scientific career
- Fields: Archaeology, anthropology, geology
- Workplaces: Western Michigan University

Elizabeth Baldwin Garland (May 5, 1930 – March 31, 2020) was an American archaeologist known for her expertise on Great Lakes prehistory and the archaeology of Michigan. She was the author of a number of scholarly publications.

== Biography ==
Garland earned a BS in geology from Wellesley College, an MA in Anthropology from Radcliffe College, and a PhD from Harvard in anthropology in 1967.

In 1964, Garland was offered a teaching position in the anthropology department at Western Michigan University (WMU). She was the first archaeologist on the faculty at WMU. In 1966, Garland helped create WMU's archaeology program in the department of anthropology, as well as a joint field school with Michigan State University.

Garland led numerous excavations in Michigan, including several surveys of the Kalamazoo River basin. She founded a chapter of the Michigan Archaeological Society and was named president of the Conference on Michigan Archaeology in 1976. She served as president of the Archaeology Conference until 1980.

"Among the accomplishments Garland is noted for, is her work with students. Garland became a powerful mentor to many students, particularly women, who have gone on to pursue careers in archaeology".

Garland retired from teaching in 1992. In 2002, Garland was named Outstanding Emeritus Scholar by Western Michigan University.

Garland died on March 31, 2020, at the age of 89.

== Select publications ==
- Garland, Elizabeth B.; et al., eds. (1996). Investigating the Archaeological Record of the Great Lakes State: Essays in Honor of Elizabeth Baldwin Garland. New Issues Poetry and Prose. p. 500. ISBN 978-0897222419.
- Elizabeth B., ed. (1990). Late Archaic And Early Woodland Adaption In The Lower St. Joseph River Valley, Berrien County, Michigan. Michigan Department of Transportation. p. 507.
