= Garden Island (Michigan) =

Island in Lake Michigan

Garden Island Minis Gitigaan
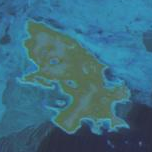
- Taken on March 20, 2022 with Resourcesat-2

- Location within Michigan

Geography
- Location: Lake Michigan
- Coordinates: 45°48′N 85°29′W
- Area: 7.8 sq mi (20 km^{2})
- Highest elevation: 610 ft (186 m)

Administration
- United States
- State: Michigan
- County: Charlevoix County
- Township: St. James Township

Demographics
- Population: Uninhabited

Garden Island is an uninhabited 4,990 acre (20 km^{2}) island located in the Beaver Island archipelago in northern Lake Michigan. It is almost wholly owned by the U.S. state of Michigan and is overseen by the Michigan Department of Natural Resources (DNR) as part of the Beaver Islands State Wildlife Research Area. It is accessible by private boat. The Native American (Ojibwe language) name for the island is Minis Gitigaan, which has become Garden Island by direct translation. The Island's Native American cemetery was listed in the National Register of Historic Places in March 1978.

== History ==
Garden Island's maximum length, from northwest to southeast, is approximately five miles (8 km). Currently, the island is not inhabited on a year-round basis; historically, this island was the home of many Anishinaabe. Some of these native Islanders lived on the island year-round, and others lived there during the warmer months. An increasing number of Anishinaabe from the mainland and Beaver Island owned farms on the Garden Island after the treaties of 1836 and 1847, planting corn and squash. Other Anishinaabe worked as fishermen. This Native settlement shrank during the early 1900s as most of its members moved away. Much of the land reverted to the state of Michigan as a result of the nonpayment of property taxes. The state never properly explained property tax law to the islanders. Other patches of land were abandoned. The last Garden Island resident, Peter Monatou, died in the 1940s.

Most of the old-growth timber on Garden Island was cut and sawn by a short-lived sawmill that operated on the island in 1912-1913. A small town, now a true ghost town, was built near the mill and named "Success", Michigan.

In 1978, Garden Island was the location for the climax of a Girl Scout Wider Opportunity called Scouts on Survival'78. 48 Senior Girl Scouts ages 15 –18 were brought to Michigan State University to study survival techniques. After two weeks of classes, the girls spent a week at Rose Lake Park practicing their new skills, and then a week on Garden Island. On Garden Island, they were placed in groups of 8. Each girl had only a knife, flint and steel, and a space blanket. The girls survived by building lean-tos, setting snares, fishing with handmade fishing hooks and twine, and foraging for wild plants.

== Terrain ==
Garden Island is surrounded by relatively cool, shallow water, making the area ideal for sport and commercial fishing. The island itself is relatively low and spotted with many ponds and wetlands. The island is well known as a place of endangered and rare herbs and wetland plants.

== Religion ==
Although the island is currently uninhabited year-round, a Native cemetery on the island, the Garden Island Indian Cemetery, continues in active use and contains more than 3,500 burials, most of them unmarked. The cemetery is notable for a number of "spirit houses" marking burial sites. The cemetery land is owned by a nonprofit organization that keeps the site protected and open to all native peoples.

== Notable residents ==
- Keewaydinoquay Peschel

== Gallery ==
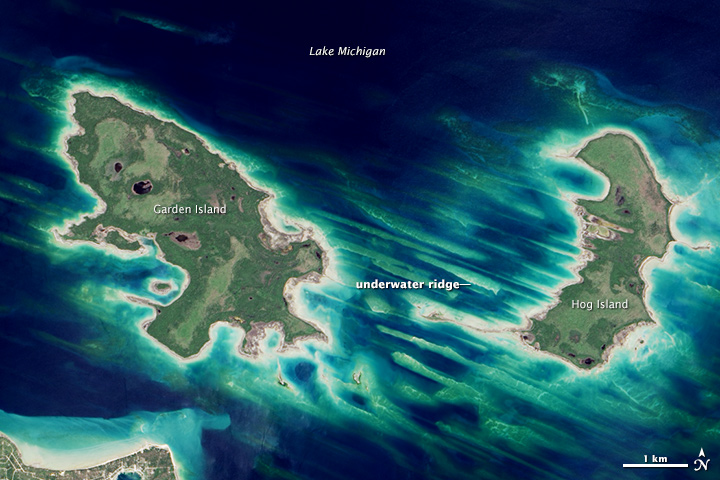
