= Welke Airport =

Airport in Michigan, United States

- IATA: none; ICAO: none; FAA LID: 6Y8

Summary
- Airport type: Public
- Owner: Paul Welke
- Serves: Beaver Island, Michigan
- Elevation AMSL: 664 ft (202 m)
- Coordinates: 45°43′16″N 085°31′13″W

Map
- Location of airport in Michigan

Runways
Direction	Length		Surface
Direction	ft	m	Surface
9/27	2,512	766	Asphalt
17/35	3,500	1,067	Turf

Statistics
- Aircraft operations (2019): 13,000
- Based aircraft (2019): 19
- Source: Federal Aviation Administration

Welke Airport (FAA LID: 6Y8) is a privately owned, public-use airport located on Beaver Island in Charlevoix County, Michigan, United States. Scheduled passenger service to Charlevoix Municipal Airport in Charlevoix, Michigan, is provided by Island Airways.

As per Federal Aviation Administration records, the airport had 16,542 passenger boardings (enplanements) in calendar year 2008, 11,976 enplanements in 2009, and 13,558 in 2010.

== Facilities and aircraft ==
Welke Airport covers an area of 200 acres (81 ha) at an elevation of 664 feet (202 m) above mean sea level. It has two runways: 9/27 is 2,512 by 30 feet (766 m × 9 m) with an asphalt surface and 17/35 is 3,500 by 140 feet (1,067 m × 43 m) with a turf surface.

For the 12-month period ending in December 31, 2019, the airport had 13,000 aircraft operations, an average of 36 per day: 42% general aviation and 58% air taxi. At that time there were 19 aircraft based at this airport: 12 single-engine, 6 multi-engine and 1 helicopter.

Island Airways operates an FBO at the airport. It offers services such as general maintenance, hangars, and courtesy cars.

== Airlines and destinations ==
=== Passenger ===
Airlines	Destinations
Island Airways	Charlevoix; Charter: Mackinac Island

== Accidents and incidents ==
- On September 1, 1995, a pilot and his passenger sustained minor injury after a Grumman AA-5 belonging to a small airline named Conrad Aero crashed during an attempted go-around at Welke Airport. The airplane impacted terrain and was destroyed.
- On November 14, 2021, a Britten-Norman BN-2A operated by Island Airways, crashed at Welke, killing four of the five passengers aboard. The only survivor, an 11-year-old girl, was taken to a hospital in Petoskey.

== See also ==
- List of airports in Michigan
