= High Island (Michigan) =

Island in Michigan, United States

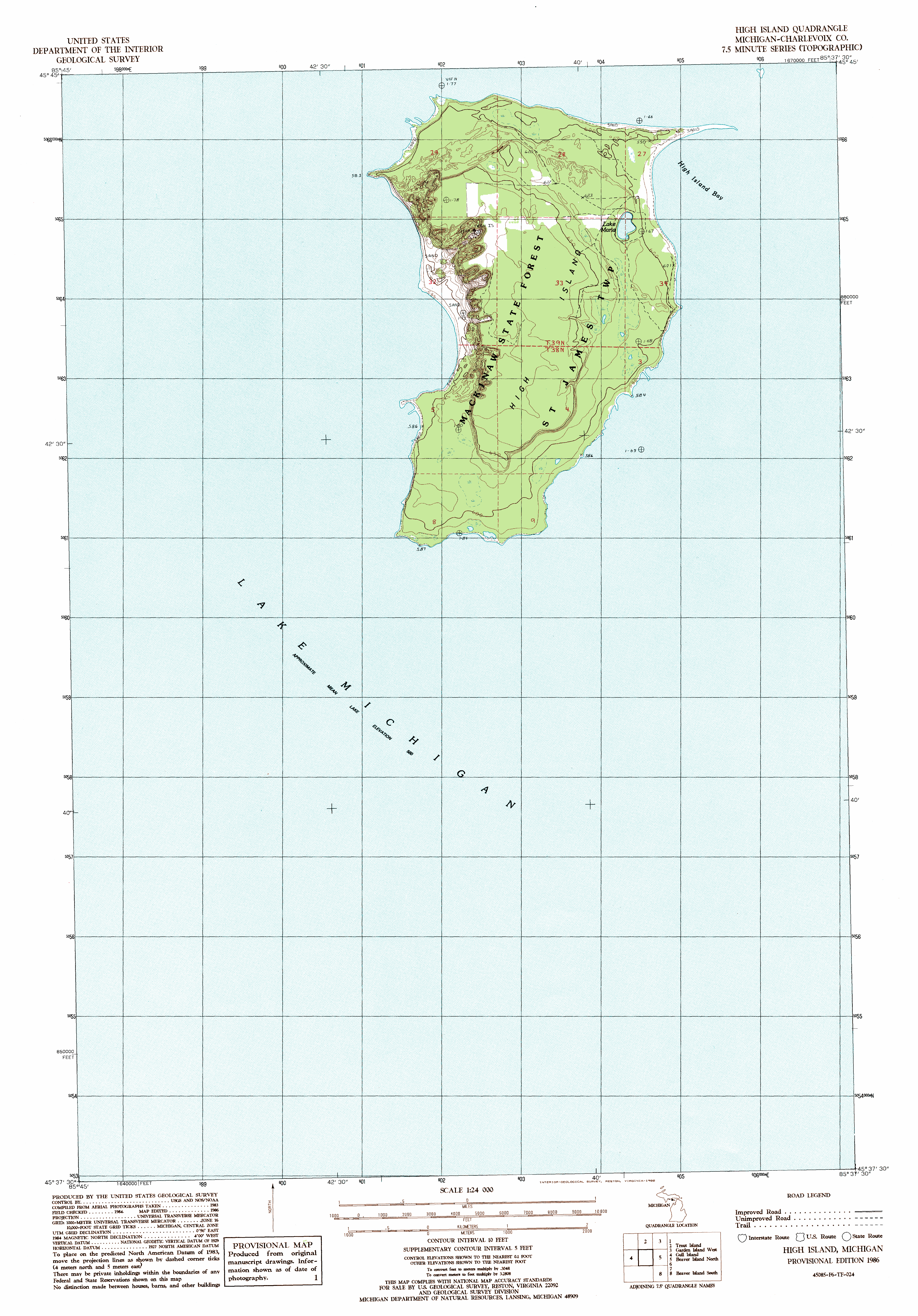
- USGS Topographic Map sheet 1:24,000

- Location within Michigan

Geography
- Location: Lake Michigan
- Coordinates: 45°43′30″N 85°41′00″W
- Area: 5.46 sq mi (14.1 km^{2})
- Highest elevation: 780 ft (238 m)

Administration
- United States
- State: Michigan
- County: Charlevoix County
- Township: St. James Township

Demographics
- Population: Uninhabited

High Island is an island in Lake Michigan and is part of the Beaver Island archipelago. It is 3,495 acres (14.14 km^{2}) in size. The island is owned by the U.S. state of Michigan and is managed by the Michigan Department of Natural Resources as part of the Beaver Islands State Wildlife Research Area.

High Island got its name from a large, perched sand dune on the western side of the island. The sand, blown by the lake's prevailing winds, has piled up into a sand dune elevated 780 feet (238 m) above sea level, or 199 feet (61 m) above the level of Lake Michigan.

The island is currently uninhabited. It lies approximately four miles (6 km) west of the much larger Beaver Island, and less than two miles from Trout Island.

== History ==
High Island was the home of a timber-cutting and truck farm operation run in 1912-1927 by the House of David, a millenarian sect based in Benton Harbor, Michigan. The High Island farm grew large quantities of potatoes and other root crops much valued by the House of David congregation, who were vegetarians.

The House of David era created intense interest among gentile neighbors, partly because members of the sect had been required to take a vow of celibacy prior to admission. The group largely abandoned its High Island operations in 1927 as the result of a sexual scandal involving sect leader Benjamin Purnell. The House of David population of High Island, at its peak, was 120 to 150 persons, who lived in a village near High Island Bay on the east side of the island.

Before, during, and after the House of David era, High Island was the home of several extended families of Ottawa (Odawa) Native Americans, who were fishermen. The island supported a public school as late as 1936. However, fish yield in the Beaver Island archipelago began dropping sharply in the 1930s, and after the Armistice Day Blizzard of 1940, the remaining Odawa moved to Beaver Island.

The DNR has a couple of abandoned cabins on the island that have not been used by the agency since at least 2008. The only remaining trail head that is not overgrown starts in close proximity to the cabins. The cabins are named alpha and omega. They are in disrepair. The roofs leak, the windows/doors are not completely intact. Research teams spent time in the cabins years ago and there are some old remnants of that habitation which includes propane lights and appliances, some miscellaneous food and survival items.

== Biology ==
High Island's Great Sand Bay, on the western side of the island, is one of the last suitable Great Lakes nesting sites for the Michigan-endangered piping plover.

Many terns breed on a sandspit on the northeast corner of the island.

== Folklore ==
The royal treasury of the Kingdom of Beaver Island, ruled by James Jesse Strang from 1850 until he was shot in June 1856, is thought by some to have been secreted on High Island. After Strang was badly wounded by an assassin, he was taken to Wisconsin for medical treatment, and it is thought that one of Strang's followers secreted the treasure at that time. Strang's care was not successful, and the crowned king of Beaver Island died of his wounds. The treasure is said to have been buried 30 paces from a "large tree", easily noticeable in 1856 from its prominent location overlooking the island's northeast harbor.

High Island was logged shortly after this 1856 incident, thereby removing a landmark vital to the recovery of the alleged treasure. As of 1987 the treasure had not been recovered.

== Resources ==
Ramon Nelson's illustrated history book "Island Life, Island Toil: The House of David on High Island" (Sarah Jennings Press, 1990) provides some insights into House of David life on High Island.
