= Island Airways =

Airline of the United States

- Founded: 1945; 81 years ago (as McPhillips Flying Service)
- Operating bases: Charlevoix Municipal Airport
- Destinations: 2
- Headquarters: Charlevoix, Michigan, United States
- Website: www.islandairways.com

Island Airways is a small passenger airline based in Charlevoix, Michigan, United States. It provides services to Welke Airport and Charlevoix Municipal Airport.

== History ==
The airline began in 1945 as McPhillips Flying Service. In 1975, Welke Aviation was started in competition with McPhillips. The two companies merged in 1983, and Paul Welke bought out his partners in 1989. In 2001, Welke was instrumental in the location and rescue of a family that had been on a charter flight that crashed on approach to Beaver Island. In 2013, the Michigan Aeronautics Commission gave Welke an award in recognition of Island Airway's long history of service.

== Fleet ==
- Britten-Norman Islander
- Piper Apache PA-23-160
- Piper Aztec PA-23-250

== Destinations ==
- Welke Airport (Beaver Island, Michigan)
- Charlevoix Municipal Airport
