= Ile Aux Galets Light =

Lighthouse in Michigan, United States

Ile Aux Galets
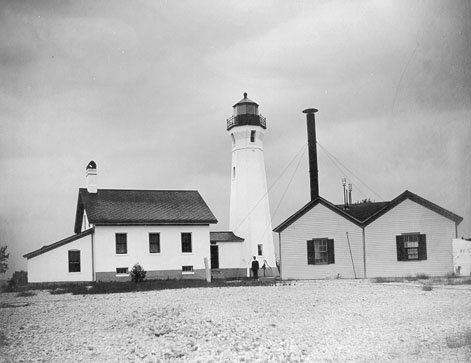
- Skillagalee Island Light Station circa 1920.
- Location: Southwest of Waugoshance Island, Lake Michigan
- Coordinates: 45°40′35″N 85°10′23″W

Tower
- Constructed: 1888
- Foundation: Stone
- Construction: Brick
- Automated: 1969
- Height: 58 feet (18 m)
- Shape: Octagonal hourglass
- Markings: white w/black lantern
- Heritage: National Register of Historic Places listed place

Light
- First lit: 1888
- Focal height: 58 feet (18 m)
- Lens: Fourth order Fresnel lens (original), 12-inch (300 mm) Tideland Signal ML-300 acrylic plastic lens (current)
- Range: 11 nautical miles (20 km; 13 mi)
- Characteristic: Fl W 6 s
- Skillagalee Light Station
- U.S. National Register of Historic Places
- Nearest city: Cross Village, Michigan
- Area: 2 acres (0.81 ha)
- MPS: U.S. Coast Guard Lighthouses and Light Stations on the Great Lakes TR
- NRHP reference No.: 84001389
- Added to NRHP: July 19, 1984

Ile Aux Galets Light, also known as Skillagalee Island Light, is located on Ile Aux Galets (more commonly known as Skillagalee Island), a gravelly, low-lying island in northeast Lake Michigan, between Beaver Island and the mainland, approximately 7 miles (11 km) northwest of Cross Village in Emmet County, Michigan. Along with nearby Grays Reef, Waugoshance, and White Shoal Lights, it warns shipping away from the reefs and shoals of Waugoshance Point, which pose an imminent hazard to navigation.

United States Lighthouse Board records initially used both names when referring to the lighthouse, but by 1889 Skillagalee started to be used exclusively. Around 1910, Ile Aux Galets started to be used again, and it is listed by that name on modern light lists published by the United States Coast Guard.

== History ==
The islet is home to a significant colony of ring-billed gulls. Its name, given by early French explorers, means "Isle of Pebbles." It is said that the English speakers found the French name unpronounceable, and "Ile aux Galets"—soon misheard, misunderstood and mispronounced—transmuted into "Skillagalee" (or some variant) which took hold. By the "mid 1800s references to the original French name all but disappeared."

There are many wrecks near Skillagalee island. However, on September 27, 1850, the loss of the A.D. Patchin—a wood sidewheeler, 226 feet (69 m) long and built in Trenton, Michigan in 1846—led to the construction of the first light on the island. Loaded with general goods, the Patchin's course into Grays Reef Passage was disrupted by currents that pulled her onto Skillagalee's shore. Her crew escaped and was rescued, but foul winds and weather thwarted many attempts to set her free. She was "pounded to pieces, becoming yet another of Lake Michigan's many victims."

Congress appropriated sums to construct a light on Skillagalee Island in 1851, and the task was undertaken by the Department of the Treasury, the administrative predecessor to the Lighthouse Board. Due in part to the extreme exposure of the location, that lighthouse badly and quickly deteriorated and was replaced in 1868.

In 1888, the United States Lighthouse Board built the current 48-foot (15 m) tower and equipped it with a 'state of the art' fourth order Fresnel lens. This is the third lighthouse on the island. This "handsome" lighthouse shares its design and shape with only one other, Port Sanilac Light, on Lake Huron.

In 1890, the station's fog signals were upgraded from the existing steam siren to 10-inch (250 mm) steam whistles. On October 4, the Lighthouse steam barge RUBY delivered a work party and the necessary equipment for the upgrade. Within the month the task was completed, and the old sirens were thereupon transferred to Beaver Island Head Light. "Life was busy for the keepers . . . that following year, since in addition to tending the light and maintaining the equipment, they operated the station's new steam whistles . . . 268 hours, [stoking] 26 tons of coal into their boilers." In 1894 the boathouse, boatways and landing crib were moved fifteen feet toward the lake, due to the ever fluctuating water levels.

The islet and lighthouse were occupied by lighthouse keepers from 1850 until 1969, when the Fresnel lens was retired. At the time, a Coast Guard crew razed all the structures (fog signal building, keeper's house, oil storage shed and boathouse), leaving only the tower in the middle of the island. An automated 12-inch (300 mm) ML-300 Tideland Signal acrylic plastic lens was placed in the lantern, powered by 12-volt batteries attached to a photovoltaic array mounted on the parapet's railing.

Except for the light itself, the fog horn sound building, keeper's dwelling and all other structures were razed.

In June 2011, the Lighthouse was declared excess to the needs of the Coast Guard and made available (along with eleven others) by the General Services Administration to eligible organizations under the provisions of the National Historic Lighthouse Preservation Act.

== Current status ==
The light is listed on the National Register of Historic Places Reference #84001389; Name of Listing: SKILLAGALEE LIGHT STATION.

As of July, 2015, the light is for sale through an on line auction process.

== Getting there ==
The island is accessible by small boat or sea kayak. Due to variable weather conditions, shallow water and dangerous reefs and shoals, any close approach to the island is hazardous. There are no landing areas or other facilities on the island, and the light is closed.
