= Waugoshance Island =

Island in Emmet County, Michigan

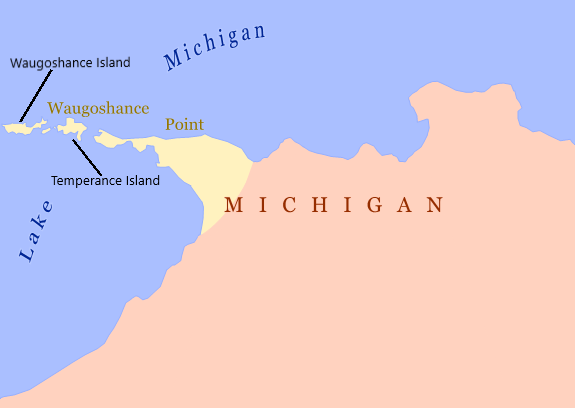

- Location within the state of Michigan Location within the United States

Geography
- Location: Lake Michigan
- Coordinates: 45°45′50″N 85°04′04″W

Administration
- United States
- State: Michigan
- County: Emett
- Township: Bliss

Demographics
- Population: Uninhabited

Waugoshance Island (/ˈwɑːɡəʃæns/ WAH-gə-shanss) is an island off of Waugoshance Point, in Lake Michigan. It is located in Bliss Township of Emmet County, Michigan. Waugoshance and nearby Temperance Island are part of the Wilderness State Park. The Waugoshance Light is located north west of the island in shallow water shoals, that prove to be challenging for navigation. The White Shoal Light and the Grays Reef Light are also in the waters near the island.

== Climate ==
Waugoshance Island

Climate chart (precipitation, max. and min. temperature)
J	F	M	A	M	J	J	A	S	O	N	D
77 −10 −14	49 −14 −19	63 −4 −8	97 0 −3	98 6 4	90 10 10	95 16 15	68 17 16	112 16 16	163 10 9	133 5 5	66 2 −2
- █ Average max. and min. temperatures in °C
- █ Precipitation totals in mm
Imperial conversion
J	F	M	A	M	J	J	A	S	O	N	D
3 14 7	1.9 7 −2	2.5 25 18	3.8 32 27	3.9 43 39	3.5 50 50	3.7 61 59	2.7 63 61	4.4 61 61	6.4 50 48	5.2 41 41	2.6 36 28
- █ Average max. and min. temperatures in °F
- █ Precipitation totals in inches
