= Temperance Island =

Island in Lake Michigan

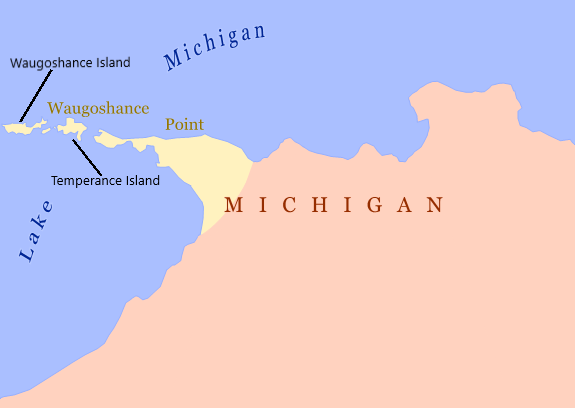

- Location within Michigan Location within the United States

Geography
- Coordinates: 45.7630644°N 85.0336748°W
- Adjacent to: Lake Michigan
- Highest elevation: 584 ft (178 m)

Administration
- United States
- State: Michigan
- County: Emmet County
- Township: Bliss Township

Temperance Island is an island off of Waugoshance Point, in Lake Michigan. It is located in Bliss Township of Emmet County, Michigan. Temperance and nearby Waugoshance Island are part of the Wilderness State Park. The Big Cut Canal separates the islands from Waugoshance Point. Together the islands form the northern boundary for sturgeon bay.

Surrounding the island are shallow water shoals, that prove to be challenging for navigation. The White Shoal Light and the Grays Reef Light are also in the waters near the island.

== Climate ==
Temperance Island

Climate chart (precipitation, max. and min. temperature)
J	F	M	A	M	J	J	A	S	O	N	D
68 −11 −13	42 −15 −19	61 −4 −9	102 2 −2	89 8 5	97 12 10	103 18 16	75 18 16	129 16 15	151 8 8	122 5 3	62 1 −2
- █ Average max. and min. temperatures in °C
- █ Precipitation totals in mm
Imperial conversion
J	F	M	A	M	J	J	A	S	O	N	D
2.7 12 9	1.7 5 −2	2.4 25 16	4 36 28	3.5 46 41	3.8 54 50	4.1 64 61	3 64 61	5.1 61 59	5.9 46 46	4.8 41 37	2.4 34 28
- █ Average max. and min. temperatures in °F
- █ Precipitation totals in inches
