= Wilderness State Park =

Park in Michigan, United States

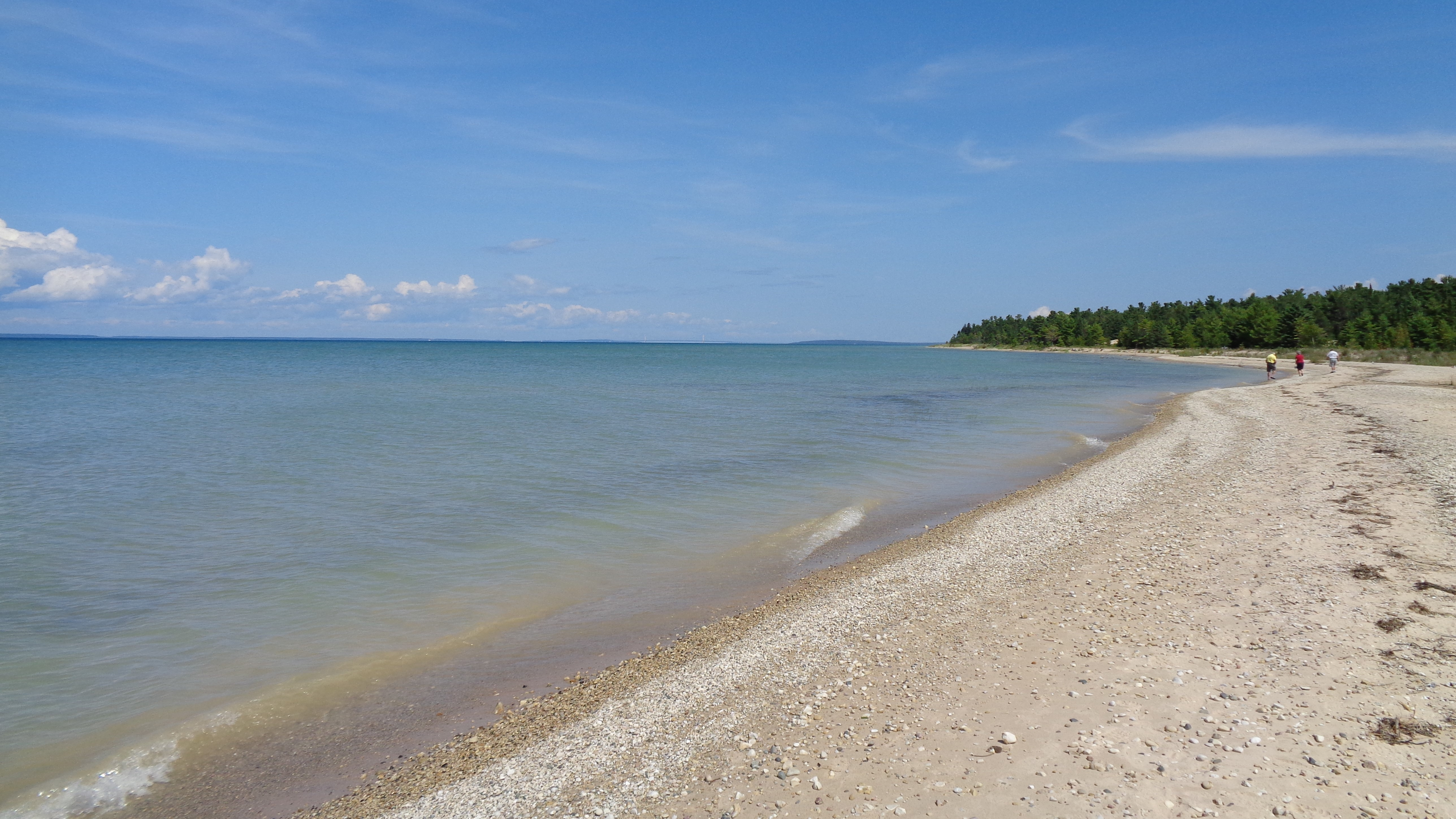
- Beachfront looking towards Straits of Mackinac

- Location within Michigan Location within the United States
- Location: Bliss Township, Emmet County, Michigan, United States
- Nearest town: Mackinaw City, Michigan
- Coordinates: 45°45′30″N 85°00′43″W
- Area: 12,800 acres (5,200 ha)
- Elevation: 584 feet (178 m)
- Established: 1922 (game reserve); 1927 (state park)
- Administrator: Michigan Department of Natural Resources
- Designation: Michigan state park
- Website: Official website

Wilderness State Park is a public recreation area bordering Lake Michigan, five miles southwest of Mackinaw City in Emmet County in Northern Michigan. The state park's 12,800 acres (5,200 ha) include 26 miles (42 km) of shoreline, diverse forested dune and swale complexes, wetlands, camping areas, and many miles of hiking trails. The state park is operated by the Michigan Department of Natural Resources, which has, as of 2006, approved a proposal that 4,492 acres (1,818 ha) be officially dedicated as a wilderness area. Wilderness State Park was designated a Michigan "dark sky preserve" in 2012.

== Description ==
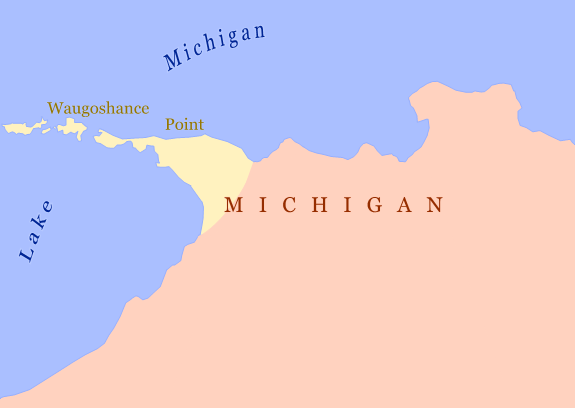
The location of Waugoshance Point and Wilderness State Park

One of the most prominent physical features of the park is Waugoshance Point, which juts westward into northern Lake Michigan. Beyond the tip of the point, Temperance Island and Waugoshance Island are also parts of the state park. Four Lake Michigan lighthouses sit near the park's western boundary. Stations at Grays Reef, Skillagalee Island, Waugoshance, and White Shoal warn shipping away from the dangerous reefs and shoals of Waugoshance Point.

== History ==
The state began acquiring the park's lands in 1896 through purchase and tax reversion proceedings. After the reversion of additional acreage for tax nonpayment in the early years of the twentieth century, the site became the Emmet State Game Refuge in 1922, with the land set aside for the breeding of game birds and other animals. When the game reserve was placed under the administration of the Parks Division in 1927, it officially became Wilderness State Park.

The Civilian Conservation Corps was active in the park for six years during the 1930s. The corps' workers built various structures, eight miles of trails, a public campground, and four-acre Goose Pond.

== Wildlife ==
The park supports populations of many animals that are part of the traditional image of the northern Great Lakes ecosystem, including American black bear, snowshoe hare, beaver, porcupines, bobcats, mink, muskrats, and otter. The park's cobble beach areas provide an excellent habitat for the federally endangered piping plover. As of 2002, approximately one-third of Michigan's nesting pairs of piping plovers were found in Wilderness State Park. One of the first sightings of wolves in the Lower Peninsula was reported along the park's shoreline by a Coast Guard pilot in 1997. In 2015, MDNR officials confirmed the presence of wolves in the Lower Peninsula.

== Activities and amenities ==
The state park offers swimming, picnicking, boat launch, fishing, campgrounds and cabins. The state park contains more than 30 miles (48 km) of trails for hiking, mountain biking, cross-country skiing and snowmobiling, that include a 10-mile-long (16 km) section of the North Country Trail.
