= Waugoshance Point =

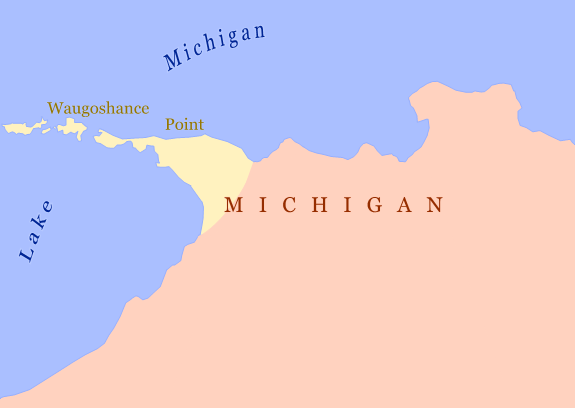
The location of Waugoshance point on the U.S. State of Michigan's Lower Peninsula.

Waugoshance Point (/ˈwɑːɡəʃæns/ WAH-gə-shanss) (GNIS ID#1615889) is a 2.5-mile-long (4.0 km) cape or peninsula that juts into Lake Michigan from the northwest coast of the Lower Peninsula of the U.S. state of Michigan in Emmet County. It separates the Straits of Mackinac to its north from Sturgeon Bay to the south and is part of Wilderness State Park. The nearest town is Mackinaw City. Waugoshance is a hybrid word, that combines the Anishinaabemowin word wah'goosh (English: fox) and the French word anse (English: cove).

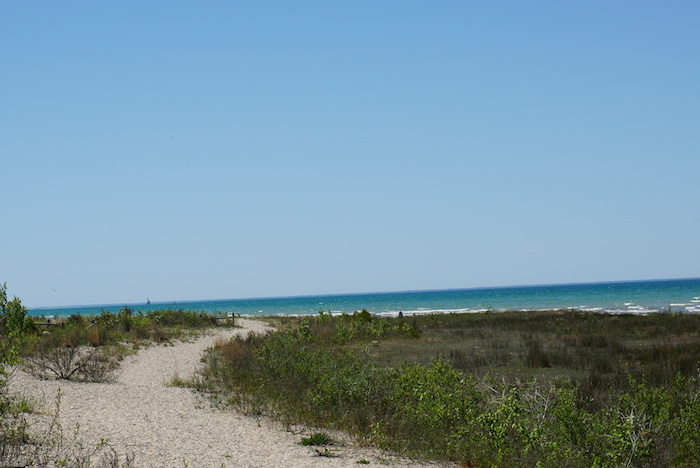
Waugosance Point sandy beach, with reef lighthouse on horizon.

== Geography ==
The subaerial ridges along the cape rise approximately 13 ft (4.0 m) above lake level (an elevation of about 590 ft (180 m) above sea level.) Beyond the tip of Waugoshance Point are Temperance Island and Waugoshance (previously, Crane) Island. The point and the islands consist of both sandy and rock and gravel beaches. These are an ideal habitat for gulls and wading shore birds, including the endangered piping plover. Dominant trees include balsam fir, white spruce, white cedar, white pine, paper birch and trembling aspen. Mosses and lichens are abundant in its wetland ecosystem. Perch and small mouth bass are abundant off-shore.

The point and its neighboring islands are bedrock outcrops of an extensive reef that reaches more than 6.5 mi (10.5 km) WNW from the inner end of the point, with water depths of only 9 to 12 ft (2.7 to 3.7 m) at the outer end. This reef, along with others in the vicinity are exceptionally dangerous hazards for sailing vessels and small craft along the northeastern rim of Lake Michigan. Three nearby lighthouses warn mariners away from the danger that lurks just below the surface and mark the western approach to the Straits of Mackinac:

- White Shoal Light (45°50′32″N 85°08′07″W)
- Grays Reef Light (45°46′00″N 85°09′12″W)
- Waugoshance Light (45°47′10.2″N 85°05′28.2″W)

== History ==
Jean Nicolet was probably the first European explorer to pass through the Mackinac Straits area as he journeyed westward in the late summer of 1634. At that time, the region's primary inhabitants were the Odawa and Ojibwe people, who called the region Michilimackinac. They, along with the Potawatomi were part of a long-term tribal alliance called the Council of Three Fires (Anishinaabe: Niswi-mishkodewin), which was formed at the end of the eighth Century at Michilimackinac.

French voyageurs and coureurs des bois explored and settled in this part of Michigan in the second half of the 17th century. Father Jacques Marquette established a Christian mission at Saint Ignace in 1671. These newcomers were well received by the Indian populations in the area, with relatively few difficulties or hostilities.

Alexander Henry, a fur trader, was the first Englishman to venture into this area after its cession by France to Great Britain, arriving at Fort Michilimackinac in 1761, after the French garrison had abandoned the post, and before the British sent to occupy it had arrived. He found the Indians to be incensed at having been surrendered to British domination and bitterly hostile toward him and anyone not French.

Henry was present two years later when, on June 2, 1763, Ojibwe and Sauk Indians attacked and took over the fort, as part of the wider movement known as Pontiac's Rebellion. Most of the fort's British inhabitants were killed. Henry was one of the few whose life was spared. The earliest known written reference to Waugoshance Point is found in Henry's journal in his recounting of the massacre and his ordeal afterward.

Much of the old growth forest on and around Waugoshance was heavily logged during the second half of the 19th century. The white and red pines that made up much of the forest was in high demand nationwide for the building of individual homes and whole cities, along with furniture and other items, such as railroad ties.

During World War II the cape, along with the islands off the point and the abandoned lighthouse were designated as the Waugoshance Point Target and used for tactical bombing and strafing practice as well as for experimentation with radio controlled (drone) aircraft. Planes were flown out of the Naval Air Station at Traverse City (now Cherry Capital Airport). Evidence of this military usage can still be found in the area. Shell fragments and motor parts are occasionally uncovered. The fuselage of a target plane can be seen from the point parking lot.

Since 1951, this area has been a nature wilderness reserve and study area.

== See also ==
- Wilderness State Park
- Inland Waterway (Michigan)
