= Barber's pole =

Type of sign

A software rendering of a spinning barber pole

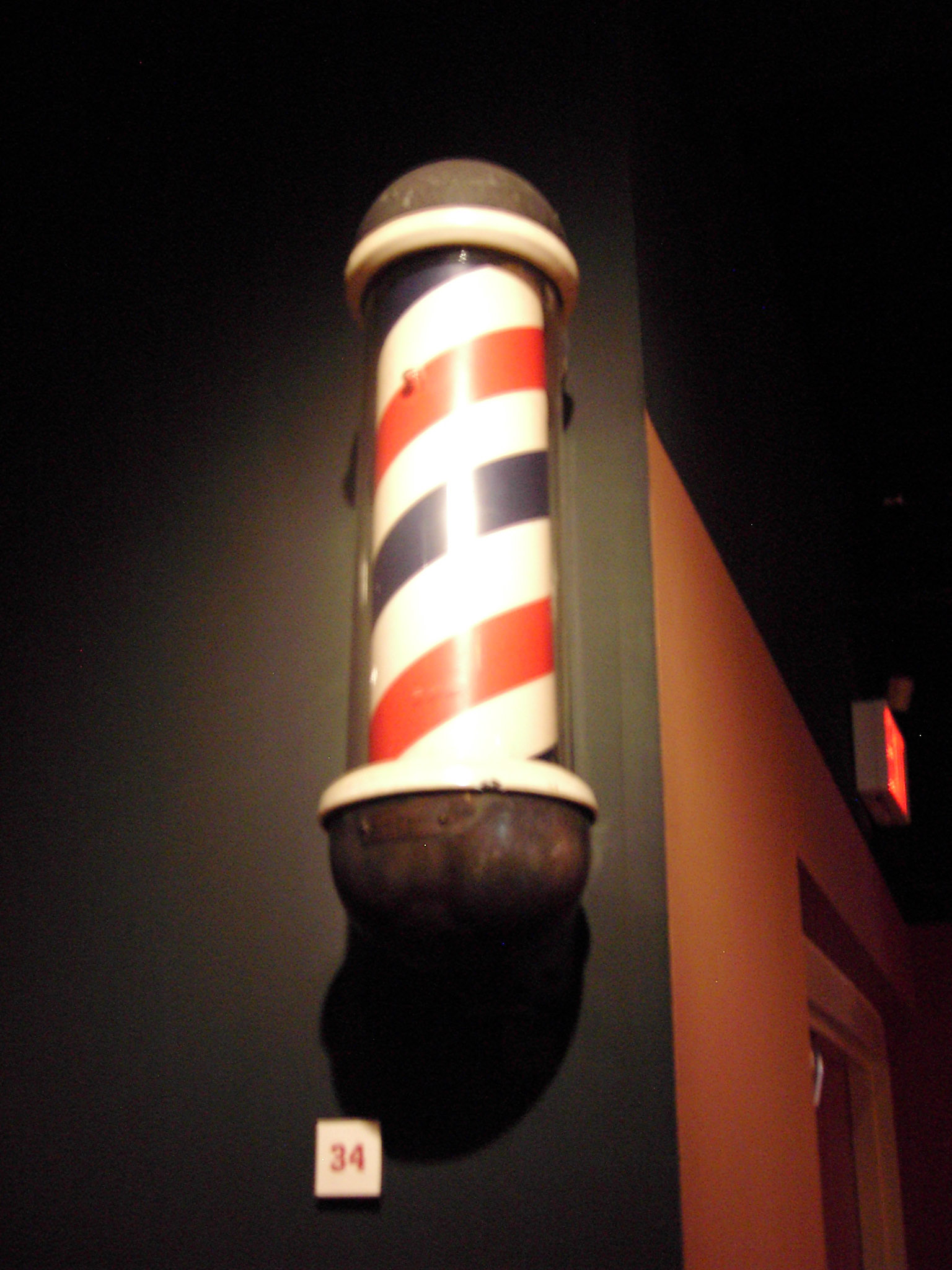
Barber pole, c. 1938, North Carolina Museum of History

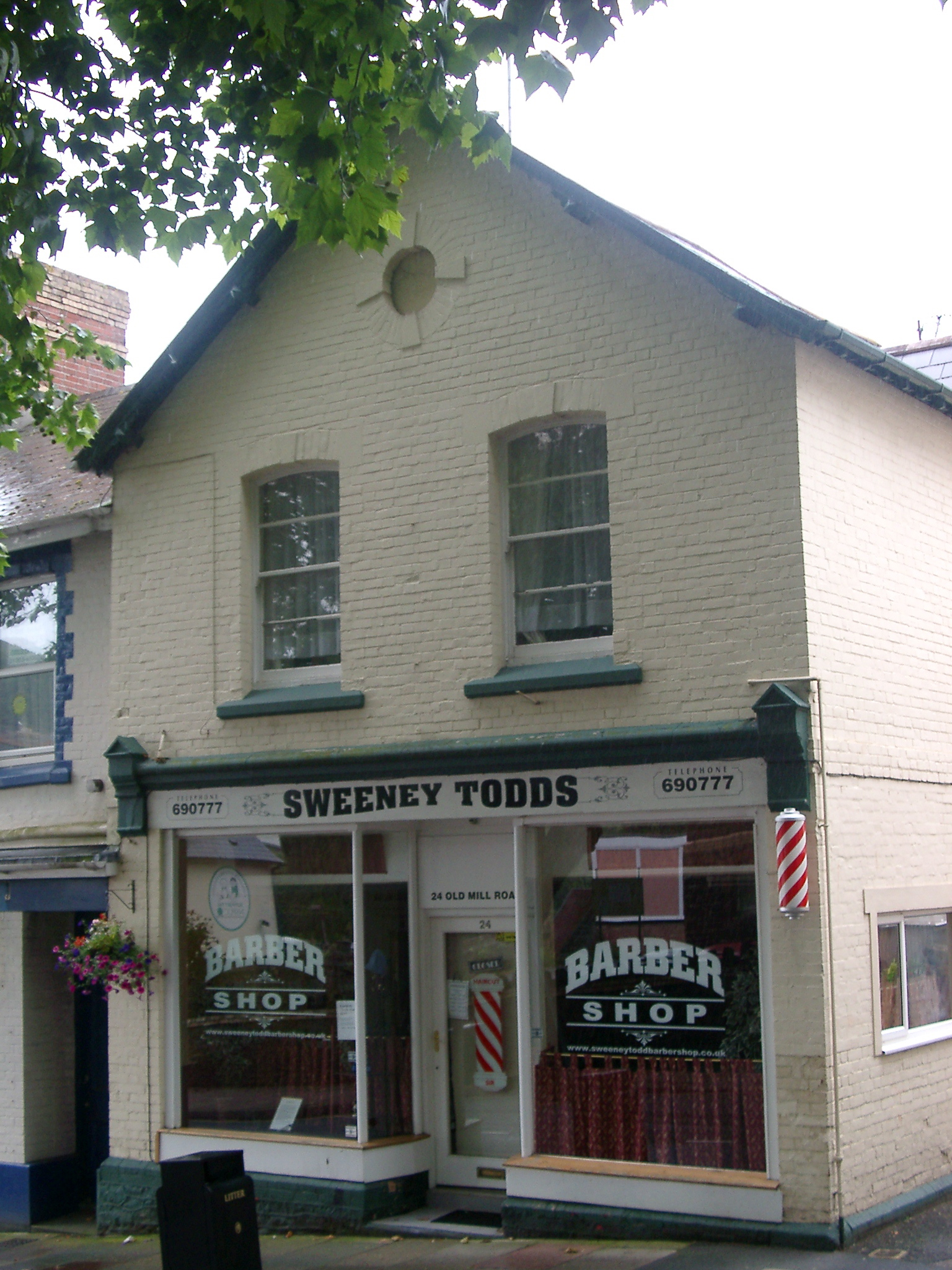
Barber shop in Torquay, Devon, England, with red and white pole

A barber's pole is a type of sign used by barbers to signify the place or shop where they perform their craft. The trade sign is, by a tradition dating back to the Middle Ages, a staff or pole with a helix of colored stripes (often red and white in many countries, but usually red, white and blue in Canada, Japan, the Philippines, Morocco, South Korea, Vietnam, Hungary, and the United States). The pole may be stationary or may rotate, often with the aid of an electric motor. The consistent use of this advertising symbol can be seen as analogous to an apothecary's show globe, a tobacconist's cigar store Indian and a pawn broker's three gold balls.

A "barber's pole" with a helical stripe is a familiar sight, and is used as a secondary metaphor to describe objects in many other contexts. For example, if the shaft or tower of a lighthouse has been painted with a helical stripe as a daymark, the lighthouse could be described as having been painted in "barber's pole" colors.

== Origin in barbering and surgery ==
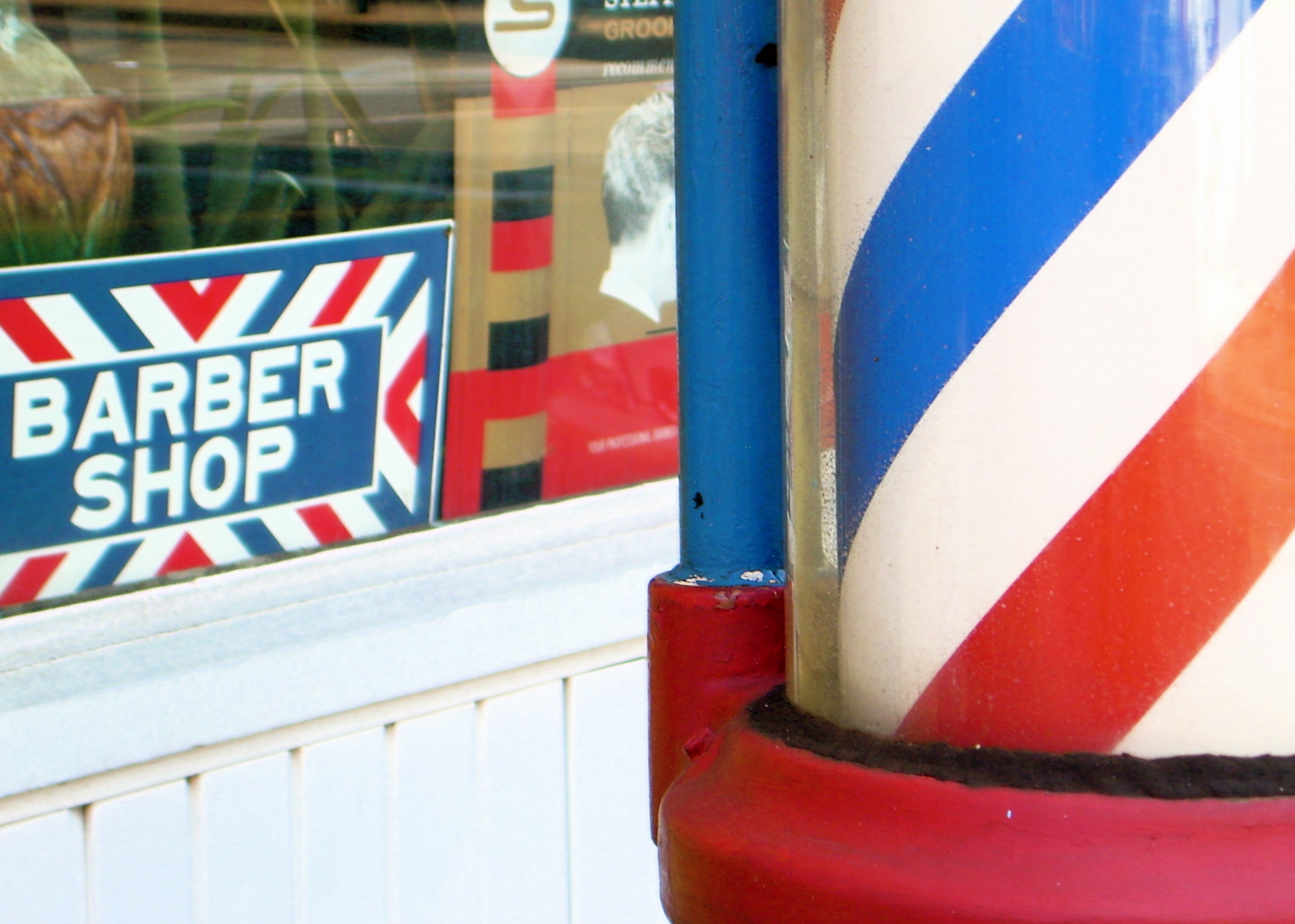
Antique red and blue striped pole in Pottstown, Pennsylvania, United States

During the Middle Ages, barbers performed surgery on customers, as well as tooth extractions. The original pole had a brassen wash basin at the top (representing the vessel in which leeches were kept) and bottom (representing the basin that received the blood). The pole itself represents the staff that the patient gripped during the procedure to encourage blood flow, and the twined pole motif is likely related to the Caduceus, the staff of the Greek god of speed and commerce Hermes, evidenced for example by early physician van Helmont's description of himself as "Francis Mercurius Van Helmont, A Philosopher by that one in whom are all things, A Wandering Hermite."

Under Pope Innocent II edicts were given forth (Council of Clermont 1130, of Rheims 1131, Second Council of the Lateran 1139) against medical practice by ecclesiastics. At the Council of Tours in 1163, the Roman Catholic clergy was banned from the practice of surgery. From then, physicians were clearly separated from the surgeons and barbers. Later, the role of the barbers was defined by the College de Saint-Côme et Saint-Damien, established by Jean Pitard in Paris circa 1210, as academic surgeons of the long robe and barber surgeons of the short robe.

In Renaissance-era Amsterdam, the surgeons used the colored stripes to indicate that they were prepared to bleed their patients (red), set bones or pull teeth (white), or give a shave if nothing more urgent was needed (blue).

After the formation of the United Barber Surgeon's Company in England, a statute required the barber to use a red and white pole and the surgeon to use a red pole. In the Kingdom of France, surgeons used a red pole with a basin attached to identify their offices. Blue often appears on poles in the United States, possibly as a homage to its national colors. Another, more fanciful interpretation of these barber pole colors is that red represents arterial blood, blue is symbolic of venous blood, and white depicts the bandage.

In any event, the barber pole became emblematic of the profession.

=== Manufacture ===
Prior to 1950, there were four manufacturers of barber poles in the United States. In 1950, William Marvy of St. Paul, Minnesota, started manufacturing barber poles. Marvy made his 50,000th barber pole in 1967, and, by 2010, over 82,000 had been produced. The William Marvy Company is now the sole manufacturer of barber poles in North America, and sells only 500 per year (compared to 5,100 in the 1960s). In recent years, the sale of spinning barber poles has dropped considerably, since few barber shops are opening, and many jurisdictions prohibit moving signs. Koken of St. Louis, Missouri, manufactured barber equipment such as chairs and assorted poles in the 19th century.

=== Use in barbering ===
The barber pole used to indicate the practice of a "barber-surgeon" who also performed tooth extraction, cupping, leeching, bloodletting, enemas, amputations, etc. Today's barber poles represent only barbershops where hair is cut and beards are shaved. As early as 1905, use of the poles was reported to be "diminishing" in the United States.

Barber poles have become a topic of controversy in the hairstyling business. In some American states, such as Michigan in March 2012, legislation has emerged proposing that barber poles should only be permitted outside barbershops, but not traditional beauty salons. Barbers and cosmetologists have engaged in several legal battles claiming the right to use the barber pole symbol to indicate to potential customers that the business offers haircutting services. Barbers claim that they are entitled to exclusive rights to use the barber pole because of the tradition tied to the craft, whereas cosmetologists think that they are equally capable of cutting men's hair (though many cosmetologists are not permitted to use razors, depending on their state's laws).

=== Use in prostitution ===
In South Korea, barber's poles are used both for actual barbershops and for brothels. Brothels disguised as barbershops, referred to as 이발소 (ibalso) or 미용실 (miyongsil), are more likely to use two poles next to each other, often spinning in opposite directions, though the use of a single pole for the same reason is also quite common. Actual barbershops, or 미용실 (miyongsil), are more likely to be hair salons; to avoid confusion, they will usually use a pole that shows a picture of a woman with flowing hair on it with the words hair salon written on the pole.

== Visual illusion ==
A spinning barber's pole in front of a barber shop in Tokyo, Japan (video)

A spinning barber pole creates a visual illusion, in which the stripes appear to be traveling up or down the length of the pole, rather than around it.

== Other uses of the term ==
=== Visual similarity ===
- The Swan portion of M17, the Omega Nebula in the Sagittarius nebulosity is said to resemble a barber's pole.
- Barber pole-like structures have been observed at the cellular level. The effects, origins and causes are controversial, and are subject to intense research.
- Matthew Walker's knot is a decorative knot said to vaguely resemble a section of a barber's pole. (Note: Used to keep the end of a rope from fraying and said to resemble a barber's pole. Though highly decorative, and historically one of the most common knots, on a modern yacht it is almost unused and unknown.)
- Sinosauropteryx (meaning "Chinese reptilian wing", in Chinese 中华龙鸟: zhonghua longniao) is the first genus of non-avian dinosaur found with the fossilized impressions of feathers, as well as the first non-avian dinosaur where coloration has been determined. It lived in China during the early Cretaceous period and was a close relative of Compsognathus. It was the first non-avialan dinosaur genus discovered from the famous Jehol Biota of Liaoning Province. Zhang found "that the filaments running down its back and tail may have made the dinosaur look like an orange-and-white-striped barber pole. Such a vibrant pattern suggest that 'feathers first arose as agents for color display,' Benton says."

=== Referential naming ===
==== Animal husbandry ====
Haemonchus contortus, or "barber's pole worm", is the parasitic nematode responsible for anemia, bottle jaw, and death of infected sheep and goats, mainly during summer months in warm, humid climates. Humans may become infected by the worms.

==== Crustacea ====
Stenopus hispidus is a decapod crustacean sometimes called the "barber pole shrimp".

==== Entomology ====
In the insect world, there is the barber pole grasshopper, Dactylotum bicolor. It is also known as the "painted grasshopper" and is said to be the "most beautiful" grasshopper.

==== Ichthyology ====
Because of its bright bands and colors, the redbanded rockfish Sebastes babcocki is referred to as "barber pole". Other pseudonyms include bandit, convict, canary, Hollywood, and Spanish flag.

==== Candy ====
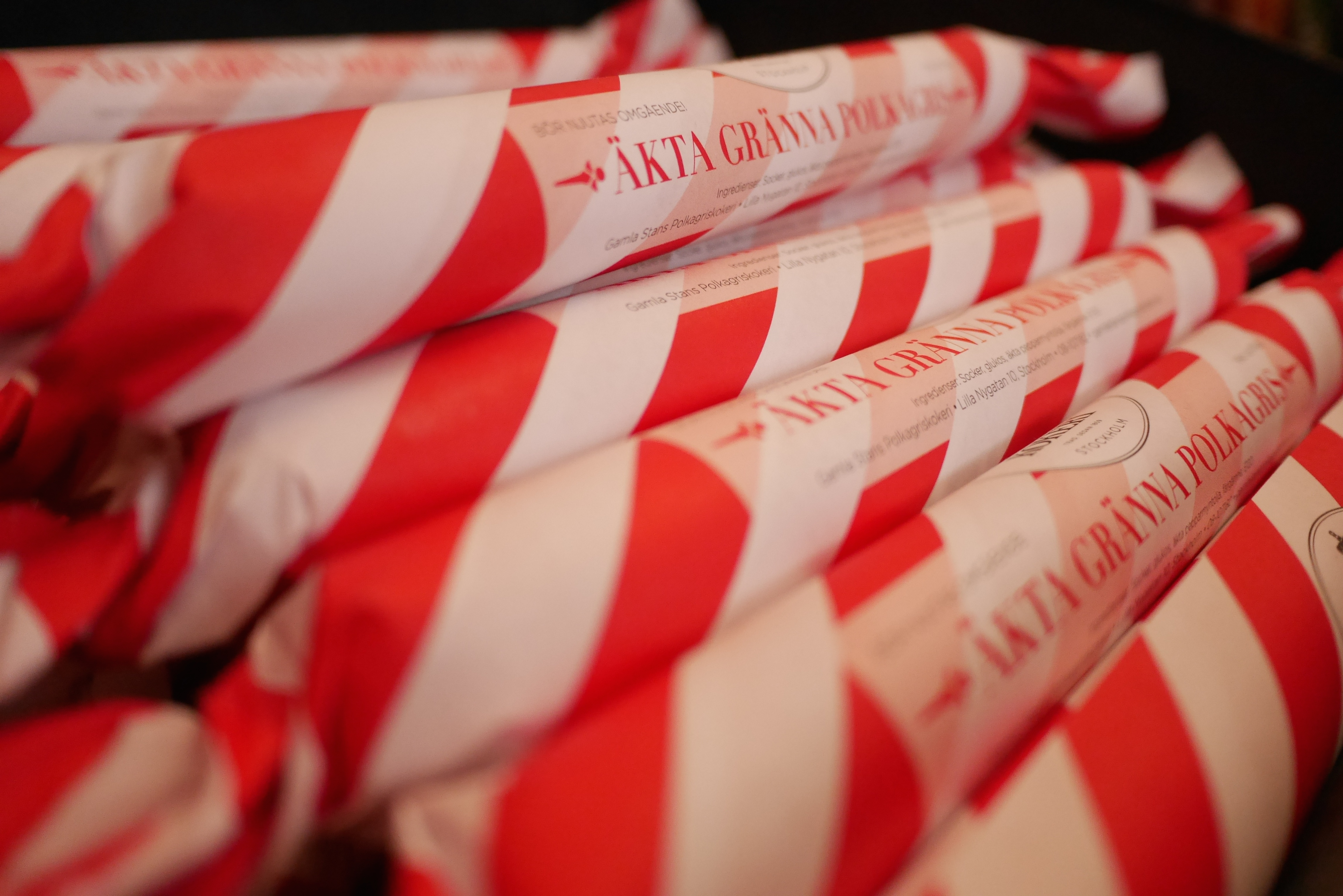
Red-and-white polkagris

The old-fashioned American stick candy is sometimes also referred to as "barber pole candy" due to its colorful, swirled appearance. (See also candy cane.) "Candy stripe" is a generic description of the candy cane color scheme. Among many other names, the candy has been called Polkagris, a traditional Swedish peppermint stick from the town Gränna.

==== Computer science ====
In user interface design, a barber pole-like pattern is used in progress bars when the wait time is indefinite. It is intended to be used like a throbber to tell the user that processing is continuing, although it is not known when the processing will complete.

Barber pole is also sometimes used to describe a text pattern where a line of text is rolled left or right one character on the line below. The CHARGEN service generates a form of this pattern. It is used to test RAM, hard disks and printers. A similar pattern is also used in secure erasure of media.

==== Electronics ====
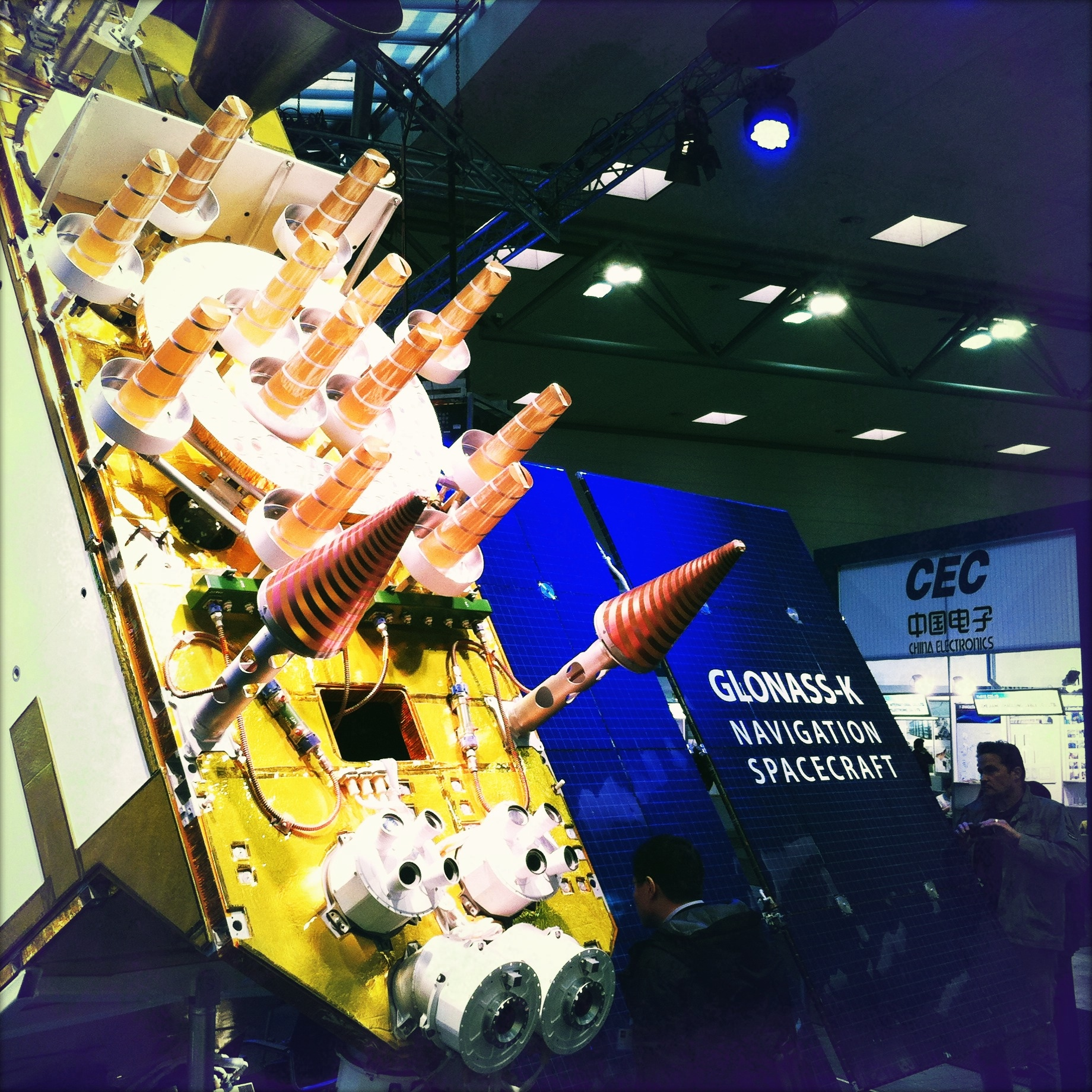
Barber-pole-like antennas on a model of the GLONASS-K satellite used for GLONASS, the Russian alternative to GPS

The strength and direction of magnetic fields and electric currents can be measured using a "magnetoresistive barber-pole sensor" (also called a "hermetic proximity sensor"), and its performance can be depicted using a mathematical formula. Such a sensor interleaves a series of permanent magnet strips with a series of magnetoresistive strips. The "conductive barberpole strips are canted across the sensor and connect one magnetoresistive strip, over a permanent magnet strip, to another magnetoresistive strip." This is said to provide a "uniform magnetic field throughout the sensor" thereby enhancing its resistance to external magnetic fields. The technology is used in wireless sensor networks which "have gathered a lot of attention as an important research domain" and were "deployed in many applications, e.g., navigation, military, ambient intelligence, medical, and industrial tasks. Context-based processing and services, in particular location-context, are of key interest ..." (See Music (acoustic illusion), infra.)

==== Aviation and space flight ====
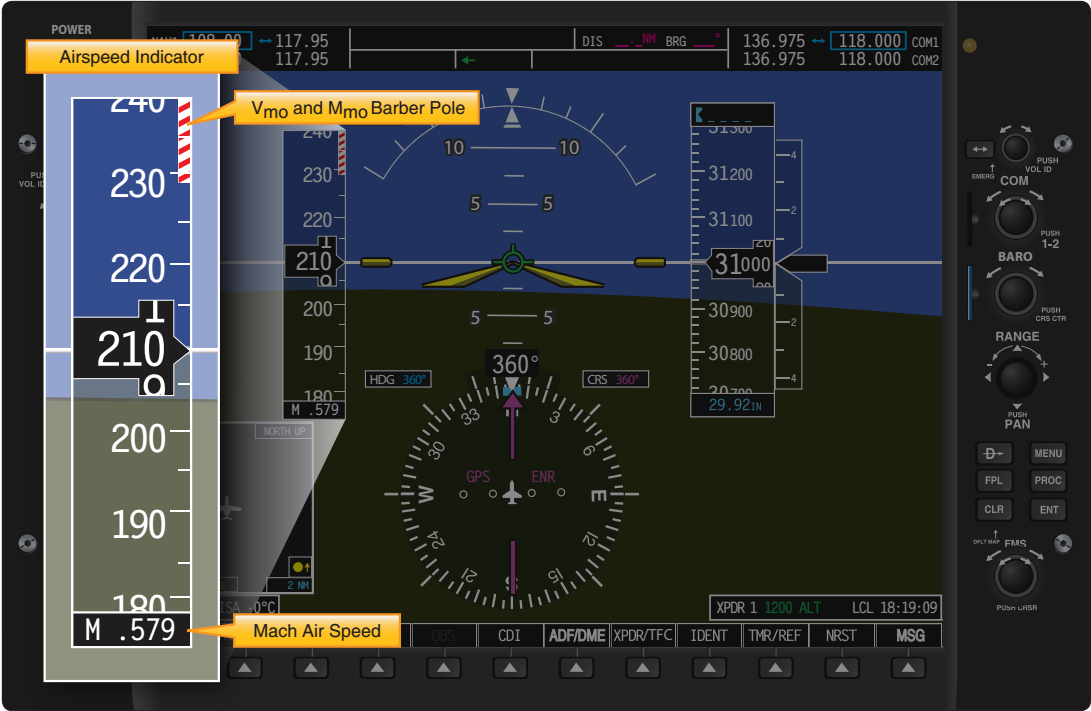
Primary flight display (PFD) with the ASI in the form of "Airspeed Tape" with barber pole, including ASI and Machmeter for a jet aircraft.

The term on the barber pole or keep it on the barber pole is pilot jargon that refers to flying an aircraft at the maximum safe velocity. The airspeed Indicator on aircraft capable of flying at altitude features a red/white striped needle resembling a barber pole. This needle displays the V_{MO} (Maximum Operating Velocity) or—at altitude—the M_{MO} (Mach Limit Maximum Operating Speed) of the aircraft. This needle also indicates the maximum operating Mach number above the VMO/MMO changeover level. As the aircraft increases in altitude and the air decreases in density and temperature, the speed of sound also decreases. Close to the speed of sound, an aircraft becomes susceptible to buffeting caused by shock waves produced by flying at transonic speeds. Thus, as the speed of sound decreases, so the maximum safe operating speed of the aircraft is reduced. The "barber pole" needle moves to indicate this speed. Flying "on the barber pole" therefore means to be flying the aircraft as fast as is safe to do so in the current conditions.

Barberpole is a phrase used to describe the striped output of indicators used during the Apollo and Shuttle programs. Typically an indicator was positioned below a switch. When the switch was activated and the activation indeed performed, the resulted activation was talked back via a separated electrical line to the barberpole indicator to show a grey and white striped pattern, thus verifying the action to the astronaut. Such switches with barberpole indicators were called talkback switches. Various indicators in the Apollo Command Modules indicated barberpole when the corresponding system was inactive. Astronaut Jim Lovell can also be found describing system indications as "barber poled" in the transcript of radio transmissions during the Apollo 13 accident.

The phrase barberpole continues to be found in many subsystem descriptions in the Space Shuttle News Reference Manual, as well as the NASA/KSC Acronym List.

During World War I and World War II, the pattern has also been used as an insignia for aircraft identification. Spad XIIIs of the 94th Aero Squadron USAS in early 1919 used variations on barber pole patterns, including: "Barber Pole" of Lieutenant Dudley "Red" Outcault; S.16546 "Flag Bus" of Captain Reed Chambers; and "Rising Sun" of Lieutenant John Jeffers.

==== Flyfishing ====
Used in flyfishing, Au Sable River guide Earl Madsen's "Madsen's Barber pole" is a traditional Michigan fly in the form of a "Stonefly" imitation "with grizzly hackle tip wings tied in a downwing fashion". Photo of Madsen's Barber Pole Fly, parachute form.

==== Gambling ====
The phrase barber pole is derisive jargon in craps, and refers to the commingling of "gaming cheques of different denominations". Wagers that combine different denominations are "supposed to be stacked with the highest denomination at the bottom".

==== Parachuting ====
- The Screaming Eagles 101st Airborne Division (Air Assault) Command Parachute Demonstration Team, which operates out of Fort Campbell, Kentucky, executes a "barber pole maneuver" (also known as "the Baton Pass") during demonstrations. Two jumpers leave the aircraft and fly their bodies together to link while in free fall. "Once together they will then exchange a wooden baton ... [and] maneuver their bodies ... to create the illusion of a giant barber pole in the sky."
- Alternatively, a "Four Man Star" can "Hook Up" and then the formation rotates to the right, creating a "Barber Pole" effect with use of trailing smoke.
- Another parachuting use of the term describes having a mess of lines tangled "behind your head and you have to cut away your main chute and pull your reserve."

==== Meteorology ====
- According to the National Oceanic and Atmospheric Administration, barber pole is a slang term used by weather and storm spotters to describe "a thunderstorm updraft with a visual appearance including cloud striations that are curved in a manner similar to the stripes of a barber pole. The structure typically is most pronounced on the leading edge of the updraft, while drier air from the rear flank downdraft often erodes the clouds on the trailing side of the updraft." See Supercell. Supercell/barber's pole photograph.
- A lynchpin of the NOAA National Hurricane Research Laboratory's hurricane-research fleet is the Lockheed WP-3D Orion (P-3). It has two barber-pole samplers (named for their red-and-white stripes) which protrude from the aircraft's front, a tail Doppler weather radar, and other unique-looking instruments hanging from the wing.

=== Border and lane markers ===
- Among the Fortifications of the inner German border, 2622 barber pole-styled markers were placed about 500 feet (150 m) apart to demarcate the no-man's land between East Germany and West Germany.
- The 41 Combat Engineer Regiment, a part of the Canadian Military Engineers, produced and delivered over 16,000 distinctive barber pole lane markers during World War II.

=== Canadian Naval group ===
The famous Barber Pole Group was originally a group of 120 Flower-class corvettes built in Canada during World War II, and charged primarily with protecting freighter convoys. The original group was Escort Group C-3. This group of ships, with its red and white barber pole stripes painted on the funnel, is still represented in the current Royal Canadian Navy: all Atlantic fleet ships wear this insignia. HMCS Sackville is the last remaining Flower-class corvette.

=== Daymarks as a navigational aid ===
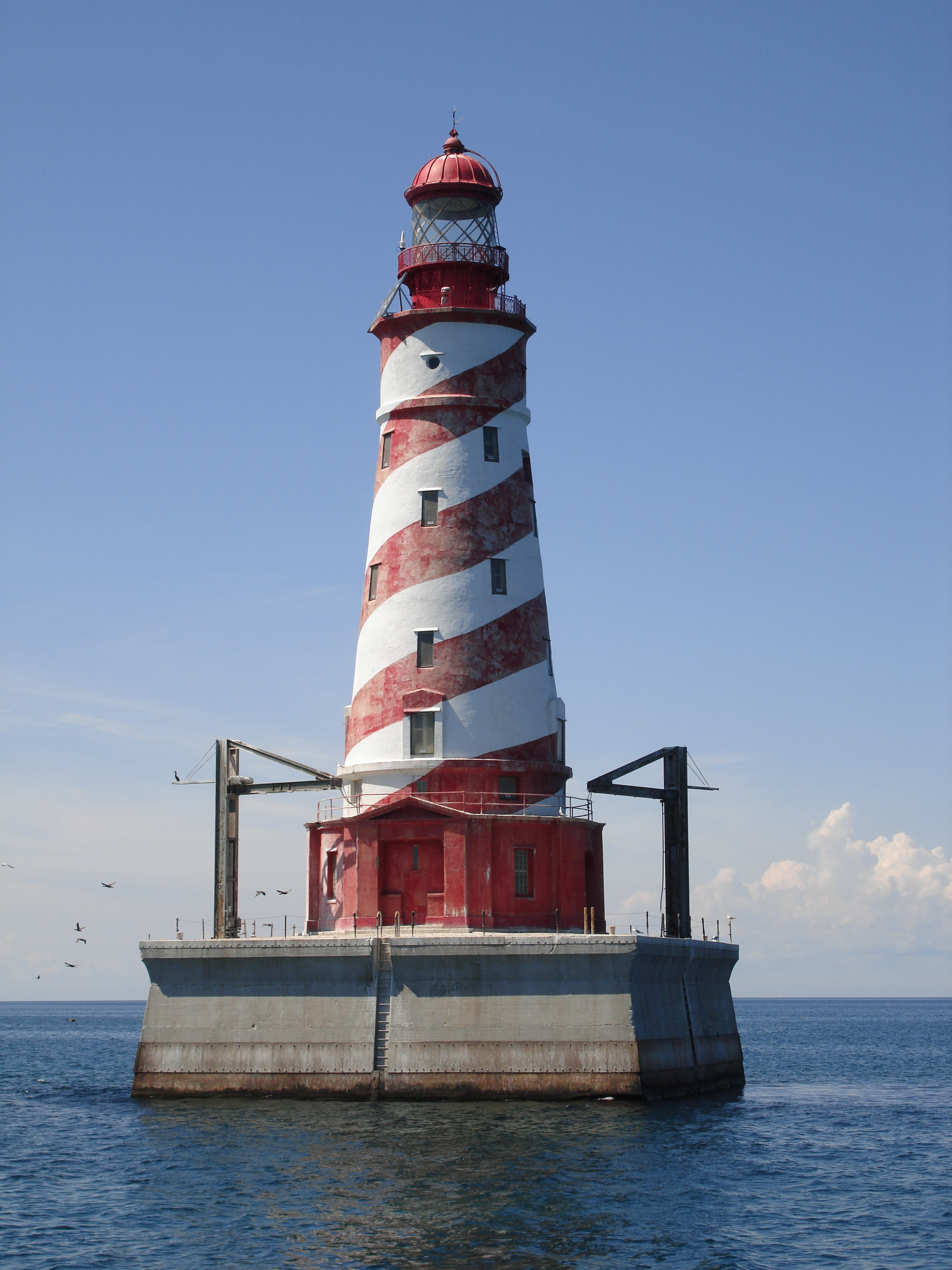
White Shoal Light

- A barber pole motif has been used as a daymark and navigational aid for lighthouses. The White Shoal Light is the only "barber pole" lighthouse in the United States, and has been used in Michigan's "Save our Lights" license plate. However, black and white helical daymarks do appear on other lights, such as Cape Hatteras Light and St. Augustine Light.
- Barber pole channel markers are sometimes used as they are in the Tamaki River.

=== Hockey ===
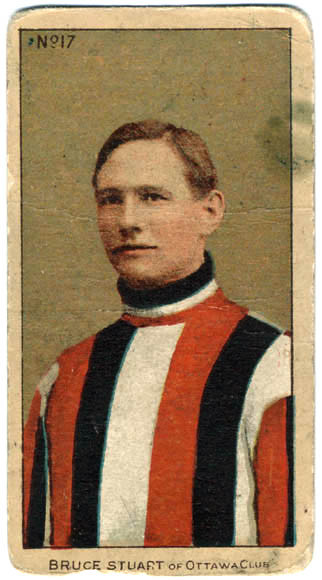
Ottawa Senators Bruce Stuart in 1909–10 jersey

- In the 1896–97 season, the Ottawa Senators first adopted the "barber pole" design for their hockey jersey, with which the team became identified. The design featured strong horizontal stripes of red, black and white; white pants; and red, white and black striped stockings. This basic design would be used for the rest of the organization's existence, except for the 1909–1910 season. In that season, the stripes were vertical and Montreal fans nicknamed the team derisively as les suisses, a slang term for chipmunk. In the 1929–30 season, the club added the "O" logo to the chest of the jersey. The "barber-pole" uniform was later adopted by the Ottawa 67's junior hockey team.
- The National Hockey League's Montreal Canadiens had a barber pole or "barber shop" design jersey for the year 1912–1913.
- In the 1920s and 1930s, beginning in the 1927–28 season, the Senators, Boston Bruins, Montreal Maroons, Chicago Blackhawks, Detroit Cougars, and Toronto Maple Leafs had a barber's pole variation in their jerseys. Meanwhile, the New York Americans, wore "basically ... the United States flag as a jersey." The style endured, but in the 1938–39 season, the Blackhawks were the last to have a barber pole jersey in the traditional sense. The Hawks retired their barber pole at the end of the 1954–55 season.
- In junior ranks, the Chicoutimi Saguenéens and the Ottawa 67's use them in the Quebec Major Junior Hockey League (QMJHL) and Ontario Hockey League (OHL). During their existence in the Pacific Coast Hockey Association, the Seattle Metropolitans wore a red/white/green striped design: this has occasionally been brought back by the Seattle Thunderbirds of the Western Hockey League (WHL) to honor the history of hockey in the city.
- The style remained dormant until the National Hockey League's 75th anniversary, when Chicago wore replicas of their barber-pole sweaters as part of the league's celebrations. Since then, Montreal has also worn barber-pole replicas during their centenary season, and the design has become popular with amateur teams. See NHL uniform and Throwback uniform.

=== Music (acoustic illusion) ===
- The Shepard tone has been described as "a sonic barber pole" and an auditory illusion.
- "Barberpole flanging", also known as "infinite flanging" sonic illusion, is similar to the Shepard tone effect. "Barberpole Flanger" is one such, open source VST audio plug-in, implementation (with four different algorithms). The sweep of the "flanged sound seems to move in only one direction ("up" or "down") infinitely, instead of sweeping back-and-forth."
- "Barberpole phaser". Roger Shepard's original work used a computer program written by Max Mathews. However, the same type of effect can be accomplished using an analog synthesizer controlled by a gadget which may be called a "Shepard Function Generator". Harald Bode (popularizer of the Moog vocoder) invented a rack-mounted device called a "barberpole phaser" which was marketed in the 1980s.

See also Buchla 200 series Electric Music Box and Buchla 200e.

=== Trademark ===
Barbasol cans use a barber pole motif. The can's motif is a registered trademark of Barbasol.

== See also ==
- Candy stripe
- Glossary of nautical terms (disambiguation)
- Signage
