= Bliss Township, Michigan =

- Civil township
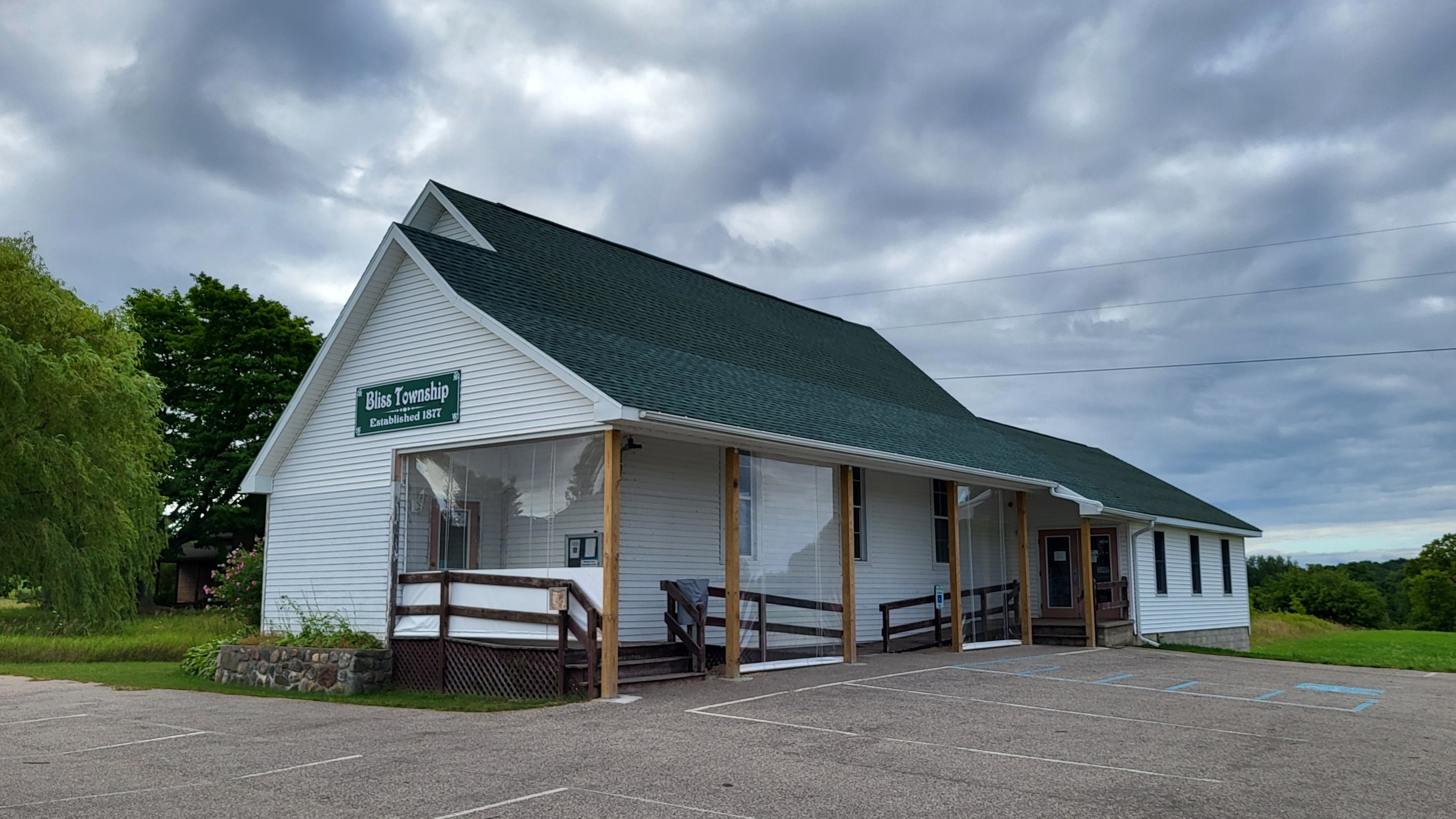
- Bliss Township Hall

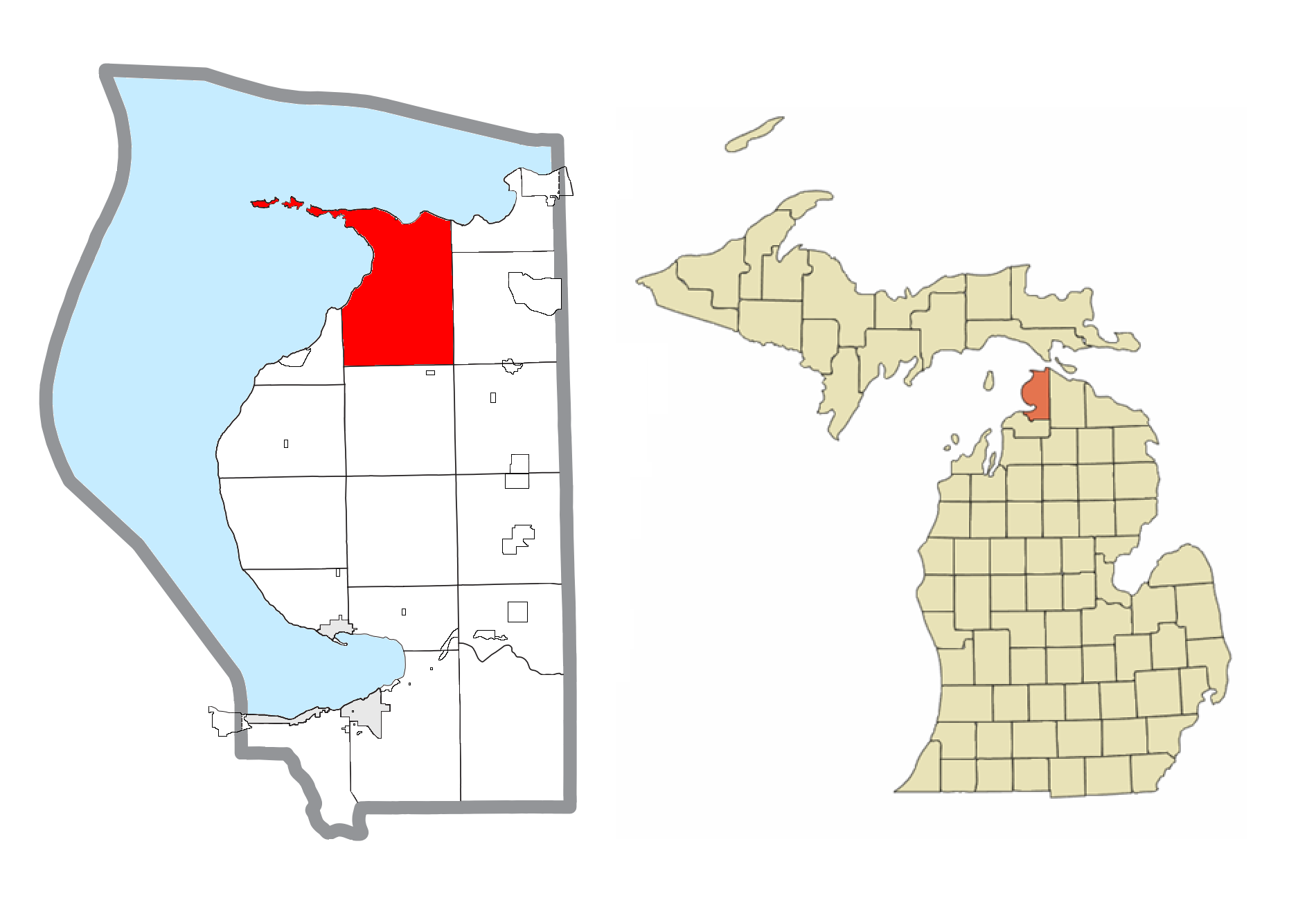
- Location within Emmet County

- Location within the state of Michigan Location within the United States
- Coordinates: 45°41′47″N 84°55′12″W
- Country: United States
- State: Michigan
- County: Emmet
- Established: 1877

Government
  - Supervisor: Philip Lechowicz
  - Clerk: Debra Prout

Area
  - Total: 46.03 sq mi (119.2 km^{2})
  - Land: 43.66 sq mi (113.1 km^{2})
  - Water: 2.37 sq mi (6.1 km^{2})
- Elevation: 833 ft (254 m)

Population (2020)
  - Total: 568
  - Density: 13/sq mi (5.0/km^{2})
- Time zone: UTC-5 (Eastern (EST))
  - Summer (DST): UTC-4 (EDT)
- ZIP code(s): 49718 (Carp Lake); 49755 (Levering)
- Area code: 231
- FIPS code: 26-08980
- GNIS feature ID: 1625947
- Website: Official website

Bliss Township is a civil township of Emmet County in the U.S. state of Michigan. As of the 2020 census, the township population was 568. It was named after Governor Aaron T. Bliss. Bliss was first platted as allotments for members of the Mackinac Bands of Chippewa and Ottawa Indians in the late 1800s. Bliss Township is the location of Wilderness State Park, as well as Grays Reef Light, Waugoshance Light, and White Shoal Light.

== Geography ==
According to the United States Census Bureau, the township has a total area of 46.03 square miles (119.2 km^{2}), of which 43.66 square miles (113.1 km^{2}) is land and 2.37 square miles (6.1 km^{2}) (5.15%) is water.

== Demographics ==
As of the census of 2000, there were 572 people, 234 households, and 167 families residing in the township. The population density was 13.0 inhabitants per square mile (5.0/km^{2}). There were 325 housing units at an average density of 7.4 per square mile (2.9/km^{2}). The racial makeup of the township was 93.18% White, 5.42% Native American, and 1.40% from two or more races.

There were 234 households, out of which 29.9% had children under the age of 18 living with them, 60.3% were married couples living together, 7.7% had a female householder with no husband present, and 28.6% were non-families. 25.2% of all households were made up of individuals, and 8.5% had someone living alone who was 65 years of age or older. The average household size was 2.44 and the average family size was 2.93.

In the township the population was spread out, with 23.8% under the age of 18, 7.5% from 18 to 24, 28.8% from 25 to 44, 29.2% from 45 to 64, and 10.7% who were 65 years of age or older. The median age was 39 years. For every 100 females, there were 108.8 males. For every 100 females age 18 and over, there were 100.9 males.

The median income for a household in the township was $36,339, and the median income for a family was $41,563. Males had a median income of $28,333 versus $25,938 for females. The per capita income for the township was $17,094. About 1.8% of families and 5.5% of the population were below the poverty line, including 7.2% of those under age 18 and 16.1% of those age 65 or over.
