= Cape Hatteras Lighthouse =

Lighthouse in North Carolina, United States

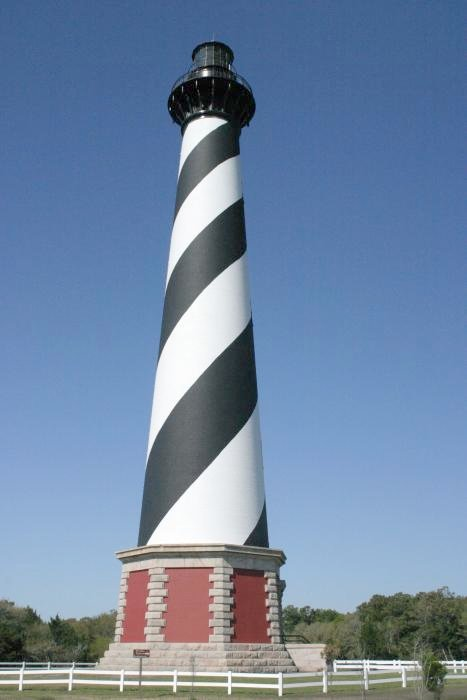
- Location: Hatteras Island, Dare County, United States
- Coordinates: 35°15′2″N 75°31′43.7″W

Tower
- Constructed: 1870
- Construction: brick (tower), reinforced concrete (foundation)
- Automated: 1950
- Height: 210 ft (64 m)
- Shape: conical
- Markings: Black (tower), white (tower), red (foundation)
- Heritage: National Historic Landmark, National Register of Historic Places listed place, Historic Civil Engineering Landmark

Light
- First lit: 16 December 1871
- Focal height: 187 ft (57 m)
- Lens: first order Fresnel lens (1870–1970), DCB-224 (1970–)
- Range: 24 nmi (44 km; 28 mi)
- Original light
- Constructed: 1802
- Construction: sandstone (tower)
- Focal height: 112 ft (34 m), 150 ft (46 m)
- Lens: first order Fresnel lens (1854–)
- Range: 18 nmi (33 km; 21 mi)
- Skeleton tower
- First lit: 1935
- Deactivated: 1950
- Focal height: 166 ft (51 m)
- Range: 19 nmi (35 km; 22 mi)
- Cape Hatteras Light Station
- U.S. National Register of Historic Places
- U.S. National Historic Landmark District
- Nearest city: Buxton, North Carolina
- Area: 10 acres (4.0 ha)
- Built: 1870
- Architect: Dexter Stetson
- NRHP reference No.: 78000266

Significant dates
- Added to NRHP: March 29, 1978
- Designated NHLD: August 5, 1998

Cape Hatteras Light is a lighthouse located on Hatteras Island in the Outer Banks in the town of Buxton, North Carolina originally established in 1802, with the present lighthouse completed in 1870 and physically relocated once, in 1999, due to coastal erosion. It is part of the Cape Hatteras National Seashore. It is the tallest lighthouse in the U.S. from base to tip at 210 feet. The lighthouse's semi-unique pattern makes it easy to recognize and famous. It is often ranked high on lists of most beautiful, and famous lighthouses in the US.

== Geography ==
The Outer Banks are a group of barrier islands on the North Carolina coast that separate the Atlantic Ocean from the coastal sounds and inlets. Atlantic currents in this area made for excellent travel for ships, except in the area of Diamond Shoals, just offshore at Cape Hatteras. Nearby, the warm Gulf Stream ocean current collides with the colder Labrador Current, creating ideal conditions for powerful ocean storms and sea swells. The large number of ships that ran aground because of these shifting sandbars gave this area the nickname "Graveyard of the Atlantic."

== History ==
=== Original lighthouse ===
On July 10, 1794, after Secretary of Treasury Alexander Hamilton requested that they make a lighthouse on this location after his ship almost crashed and sank on its to way to The New World, giving it the nickname "Hamilton's light." U.S. Congress appropriated $44,000 "for erecting a lighthouse on the headland of Cape Hatteras and a lighted beacon on Shell Castle Island, in the harbor of Ocracoke in the State of North Carolina." Its 198-foot height makes it the tallest brick lighthouse structure in the United States and 2nd in the world. Since its base is almost at sea level, it is only the 15th highest light in the United States, the first 14 being built on higher ground. The Cape Hatteras Lighthouse was constructed in 1802.

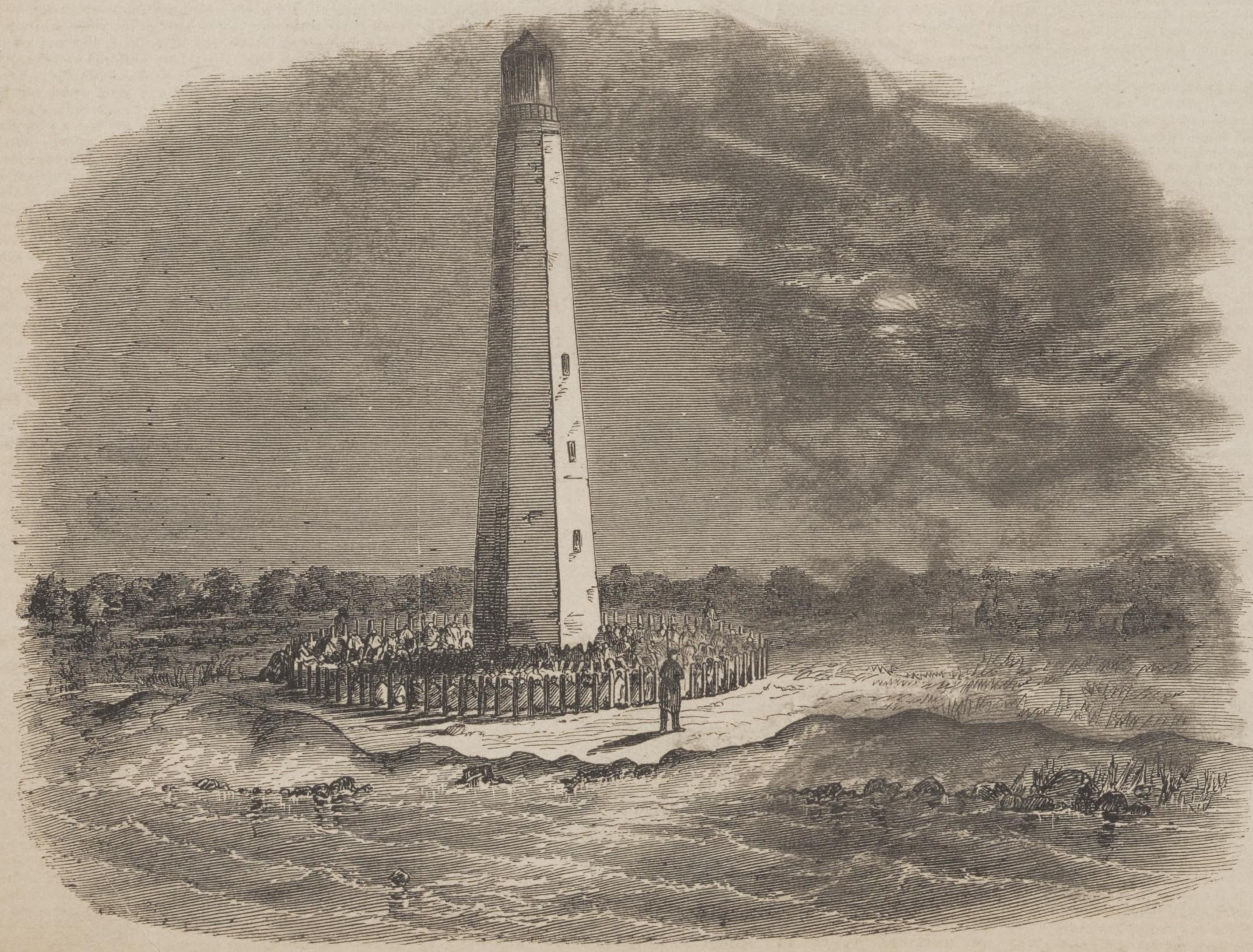
Etching of the old Cape Hatteras Lighthouse in 1861

The Cape Hatteras light marked very dangerous shoals that extend from the cape for a distance of 10 nautical miles (19 km). The original tower was built of dark sandstone and retained its natural color. The original light consisted of 18 lamps; with 14-inch (360 mm) reflectors, and was 112 feet (34 m) above sea level. It was visible in clear weather for a distance of 18 miles (29 km).

In July 1851, Lt. David D. Porter, USN, reported as follows:

"Hatteras light, the most important on our coast is, without doubt, the worst light in the world. Cape Hatteras is the point made by all vessels going to the south, and also coming from that direction; the current of the Gulf Stream runs so close to the outer point of the shoals that vessels double as close round the breakers as possible, to avoid its influence. The only guide they have is the light, to tell them when up with the shoals; but I have always had so little confidence in it, that I have been guided by the lead, without the use of which no vessel should pass Hatteras. The first nine trips I made I never saw Hatteras light at all, though frequently passing in sight of the breakers, and when I did see it, I could not tell it from a steamer's light, excepting that the steamer's lights are much brighter. It has improved much latterly but is still a wretched light. It is all-important that Hatteras should be provided with a revolving light of great intensity, and that the light is raised 15 feet (4.6 m) higher than at present. Twenty-four steamship's lights, of great brilliancy, pass this point in one month, nearly at the rate of one every night (they all pass at night) and it can be seen how easily a vessel may be deceived by taking a steamer's light for a light onshore."

The improvement in the light referred to had begun in 1845 when the reflectors were changed from 14 to 15-inch (380 mm). In 1848 the 18 lamps were changed to 15 lamps with 21-inch (530 mm) reflectors and the light had become visible in clear weather at a distance of 20 miles (32 km). In 1854 a first-order Fresnel lens with flashing white light was substituted for the old reflecting apparatus, and the tower was raised to 150 feet (46 m).

In 1860 the Lighthouse Board reported that Cape Hatteras Lighthouse required protection, due to the outbreak of the Civil War. In 1862 the Board reported "Cape Hatteras, lens and lantern destroyed, light reexhibited.

=== Beacon, 1855 ===
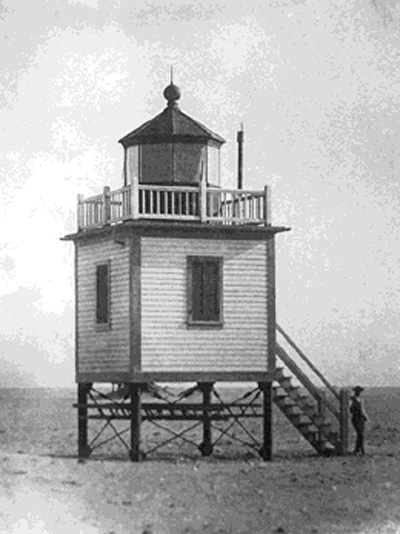
Cape Hatteras Beacon, USLHS Archive photo

The Cape Hatteras Beacon was a small lighthouse at Cape Point on Cape Hatteras, North Carolina. The beacon was established in 1855, and was moved several times over the course of its career; due to its exposed position, it took the brunt of many storms that blew in from the Atlantic Ocean and was subject to frequent erosion.

It was a short, square tower constructed of wood, with a sixth order Fresnel Lens as the light. Little else is known about it, except that it was the responsibility of the Third Assistant Keeper at Cape Hatteras, working under the head keeper's supervision. The Beacon was active until it was last lit on November 24th, 1898 by keeper Tilman Smith. No trace of the lighthouse survives today.

=== Second lighthouse, 1868 ===
At the behest of mariners and officers of the U.S. Navy, Congress appropriated $80,000 to the United States Lighthouse Board to construct a new beacon at Cape Hatteras in 1868.

Completed in just under two years under the direction of brevet Brigadier General J. H. Simpson of the U.S. Army Corps of Engineers, the new Cape Hatteras lighthouse cost $167,000. The new tower, from which the first-order light was first exhibited on December 16, 1871, was the tallest brick lighthouse tower in the world. It was 200 feet (61 m) above ground and the focal height of the light was 208 feet (63 m) above water. The old tower was demolished in February 1871, leaving ruins that lasted until finally eroded away in a storm in 1980.

In the spring of 1879 the tower was struck by lightning. Cracks subsequently appeared in the masonry walls, which were remedied by placing a metal rod to connect the iron work of the tower with an iron disk sunk in the ground. In 1912 the candlepower of the light was increased from 27,000 to 80,000.

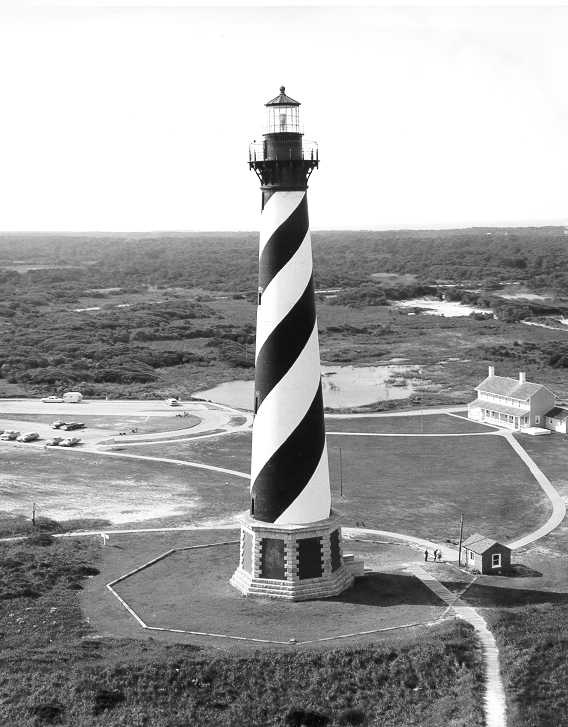
Cape Hatteras Light, USCG Archive photo

Ever since the completion of the new tower in 1870, there had begun a very gradual encroachment of the sea upon the beach. This did not become serious, however, until 1919, when the high water line had advanced to about 120 ft (36.5) from the base of the tower. Since that time the surf gnawed steadily toward the base of the tower until 1935, when the site was finally reached by the surf. Several attempts were made to arrest this erosion, but dikes and breakwaters had been of no avail.

=== Relocation 1935 ===
In 1935, therefore, the tower light was replaced by an Aerobeacon atop a four-legged steel skeleton tower, placed farther back from the sea on a sand dune 166 feet (51 m) above the sea, visible for 19 miles (31 km). The abandoned brick tower was then put in the custody of the National Park Service.

The Civilian Conservation Corps and Works Progress Administration erected a series of wooden revetments which checked the wash that was carrying away the beach. In 1942, when German U-boats began attacking ships just offshore, the Coast Guard resumed its control over the brick tower and staffed it as a lookout station until 1945. By then, due to accretion of sand on the beach, the brick tower was 500 to 900 feet (270 m) inland from the sea and again tenable as a site for the light, which was placed back in commission January 23, 1950.

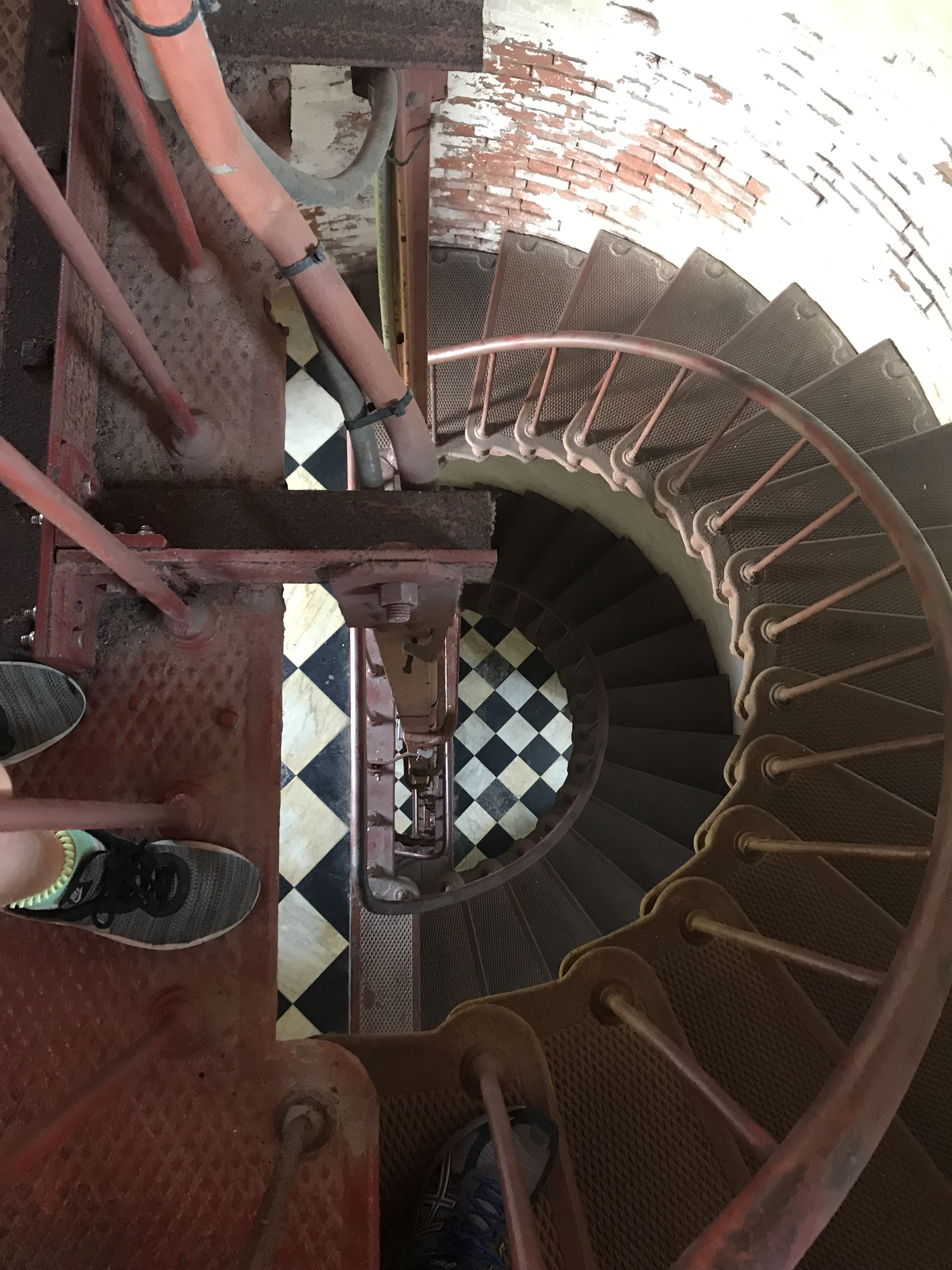
Internal staircase of Hatteras Lighthouse

The new light consisted of a 36-inch (0.91 m) aviation-type rotating beacon of 250,000 candlepower, visible 20 miles (32 km), and flashing white every 7.5 seconds. The steel skeleton tower, known as the Buxton Woods Tower, was retained by the Coast Guard in the event that the brick tower again became endangered by erosion requiring that the light again be moved.

The light displays a highly visible black and white diagonal daymark paint scheme. It shares similar markings with the St. Augustine Light. Another lighthouse, with helical markings—red and white 'candy cane stripe'-- is the White Shoal Light (Michigan), which is the only true 'barber pole' lighthouse in the United States. Its distinctive "barber pole" paint job is consistent with other North Carolina black-and-white lighthouses, "each with their own pattern to help sailors identify lighthouses during daylight hours." Today the Coast Guard owns and operates the navigational equipment, while the National Park Service maintains the tower as a historic structure. The Hatteras Island Visitor Center, formerly the Double Keepers Quarters located next to the lighthouse, elaborates on the Cape Hatteras story and the lifestyle on the Outer Banks. Cape Hatteras Lighthouse, tallest in the United States, stands 208 feet (63 m) from the bottom of the foundation to the peak of the roof. To reach the light, which shines 191 feet (58 m) above mean high-water mark, requires climbing 268 steps. The construction order of 1,250,000 bricks was used in the construction of the lighthouse and principal keeper's quarters. The light is used and maintained by the U.S. Coast Guard as an Aid to Navigation, protecting Mariners from the treacherous shoals of the Graveyard of the Atlantic.

=== Relocation, 1999 ===
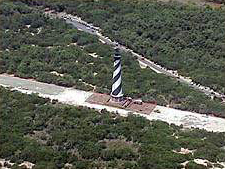
Cape Hatteras lighthouse during its relocation on July 1, 1999

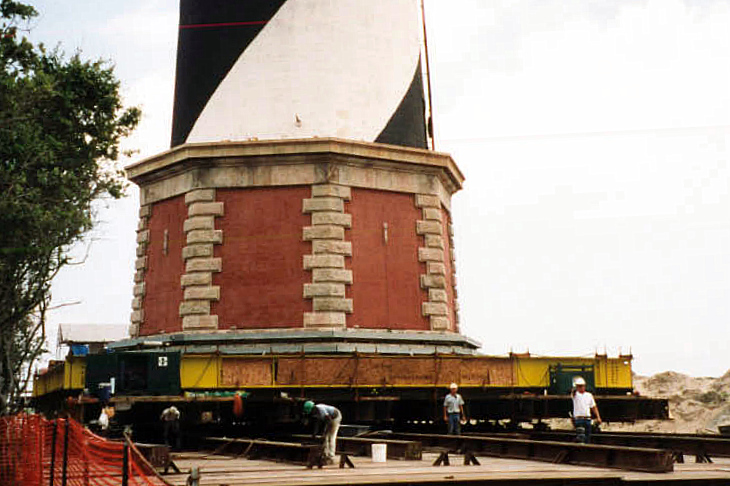
Workers prepare for another few inches of movement.

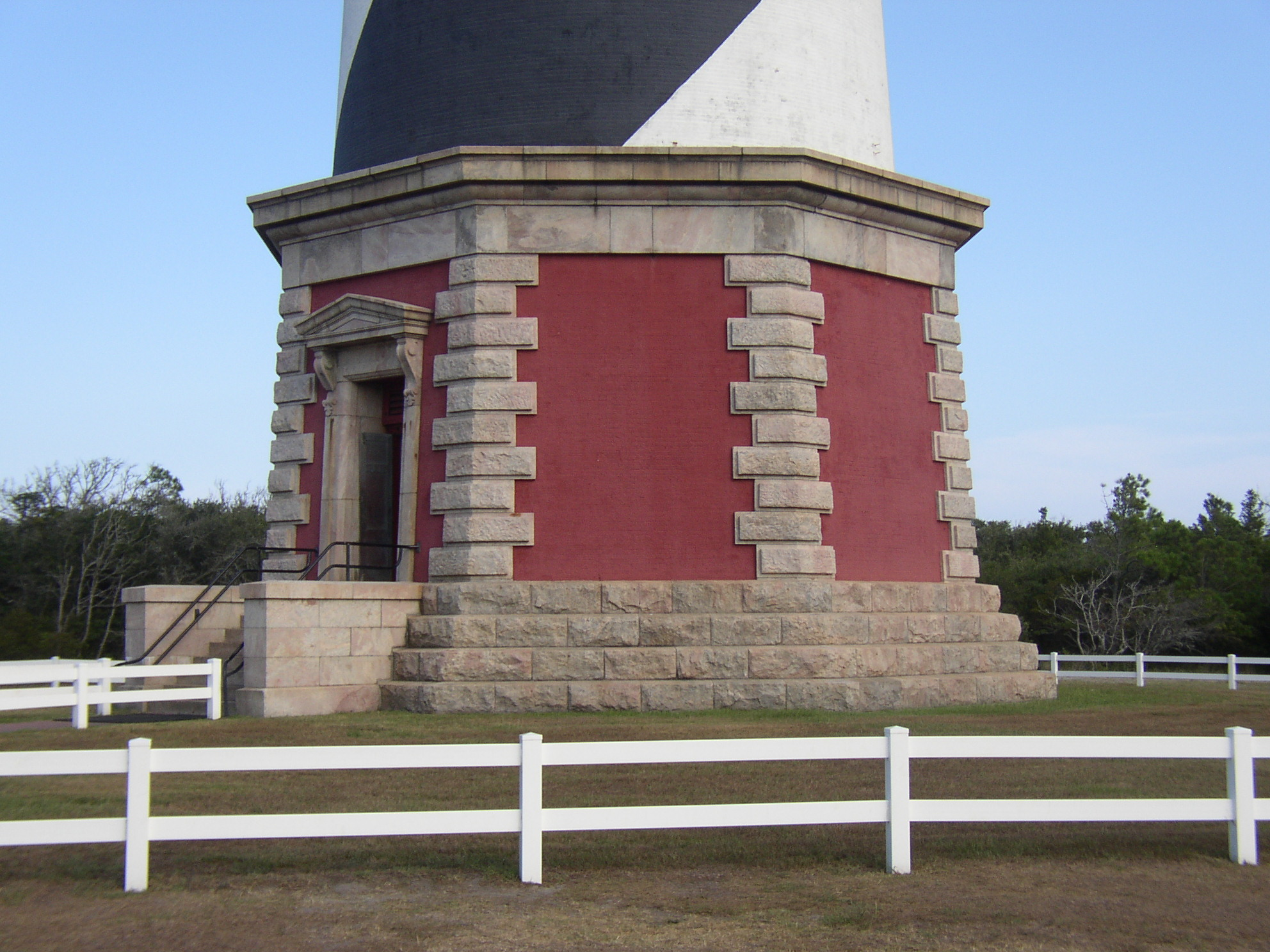
The base of Cape Hatteras Light after relocation

After Congress allocated funding for the project in 1998, starting on June 17, 1999, with the sea again encroaching, the Cape Hatteras lighthouse was moved from its original location at the edge of the ocean to safer ground. Due to erosion of the shore, the lighthouse was just 15 feet (4.6 m) from the water's edge and was in imminent danger. The move was a total distance of 2,900 feet (880 m) to the southwest, placing the lighthouse 1,500 feet (460 m) from the current shoreline. All other support buildings at the site were also moved at the same time. All support buildings were placed back in positions that maintained their original compass orientations and distance/height relationship to the lighthouse. International Chimney Corp. of Buffalo, New York was awarded the contract to move the lighthouse, assisted by, among other contractors, Expert House Movers. The move was controversial at the time with speculation that the structure would not survive the move, resulting in lawsuits that were later dismissed. Despite some opposition, work progressed and the move of the lighthouse was completed on July 9, 1999, with final work being completed on September 14, 1999.

The Cape Hatteras Light House Station Relocation Project became known as "The Move of the Millennium." General contractor International Chimney and Expert House Movers won the 40th Annual Outstanding Civil Engineering Achievement Award from the American Society of Civil Engineers in 1999. The Cape Hatteras Lighthouse is one of the tallest masonry structures ever moved (200 feet tall and weighing 5,000 tons).

== Hatteras Island Visitor Center and Museum of the Sea ==
Adjacent to the Cape Hatteras Light is the Hatteras Island Visitor Center and Museum of the Sea, operated by the National Park Service, which is located in the historic Cape Hatteras Lighthouse Double Keepers' Quarters. Exhibits include the history, maritime heritage and natural history of the Outer Banks and the lighthouse. The visitor center offers information about the Cape Hatteras National Seashore, ranger programs and a bookstore.

== Specifications ==
- Construction material: Approximately 1,250,000 bricks
- Height above sea level: 210 feet (64 m)
- Height of the structure: 198.5 feet (60.5 m)
- Daymark: black double helix spiral stripes on white background
- Number of steps: 257 steps to reach the light
- Brightness: 800,000 candle power from each of two 1,000-watt lamps
- Flash pattern: 1 second flash, 6.5 second eclipse
- Visibility: From 20 nautical miles (37 km) in clear conditions. In exceptional conditions, it has been seen from 51 miles (94 km) out.

== See also ==
- List of tallest lighthouses
