= Waugoshance Light =

Lighthouse in Michigan, United States

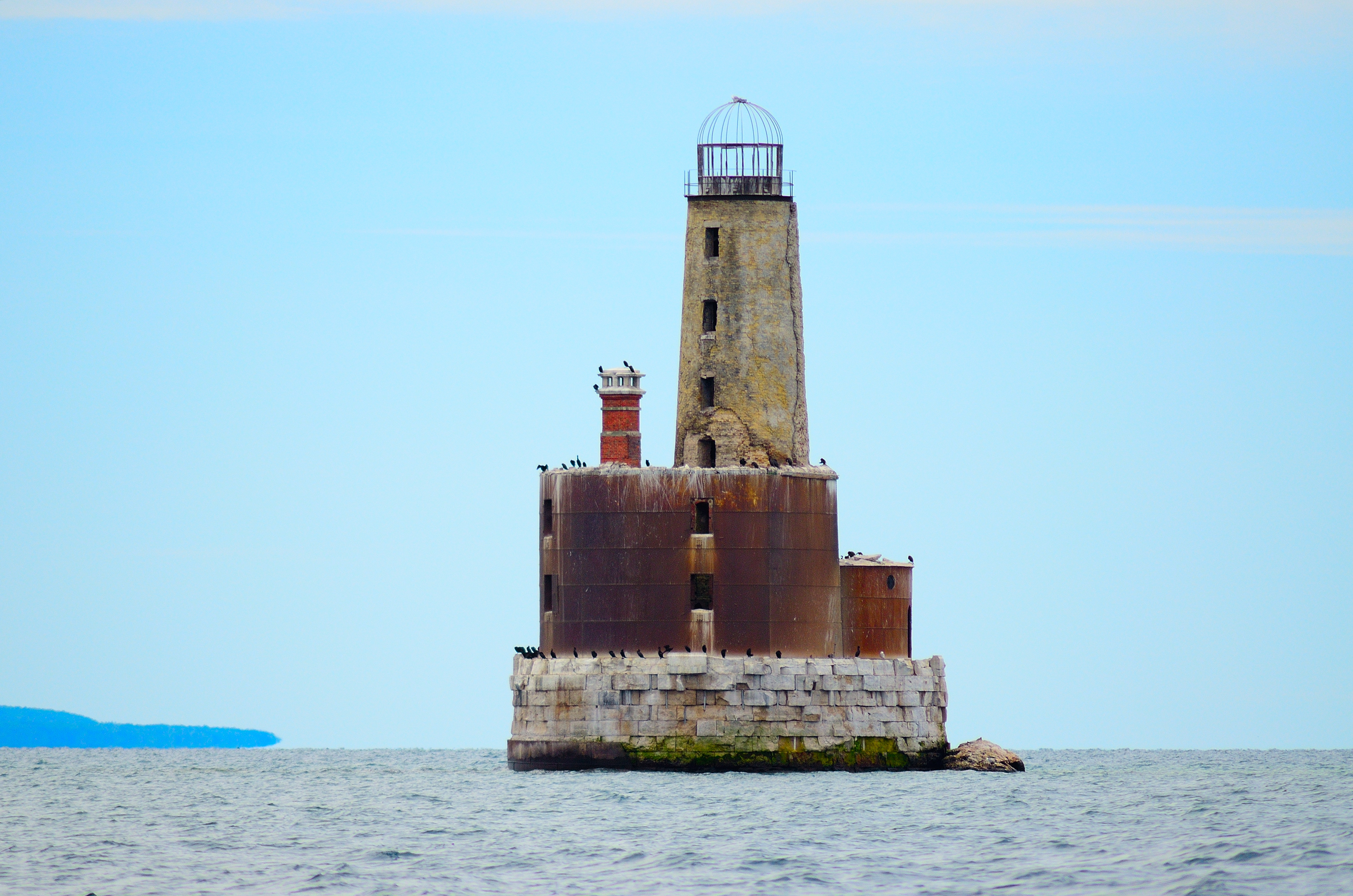
- Waugoshance in 2015
- Location: Lake Michigan
- Coordinates: 45°47′10″N 85°5′28″W

Tower
- Constructed: 1850
- Foundation: Timber crib filled with stone/concrete
- Construction: Brick encased with steel or iron boilerplate
- Height: 63 feet (19 m)
- Shape: Frustum of a cone (encased in iron in 1883)
- Markings: Natural
- Heritage: National Register of Historic Places listed place
- Fog signal: Original: Fog bell, Steam Whistle

Light
- First lit: 1851
- Deactivated: 1912
- Focal height: 74 feet (23 m)
- Lens: Fourth order Fresnel lens
- Waugoshance Light Station
- U.S. National Register of Historic Places
- Nearest city: Waugoshance Island, Michigan
- Area: 0.1 acres (0.040 ha)
- MPS: U.S. Coast Guard Lighthouses and Light Stations on the Great Lakes TR
- NRHP reference No.: 83000841
- Added to NRHP: August 04, 1983

The ruined lighthouse at Waugoshance protects boats from a shoal area at the northern end of Lake Michigan. The lighthouse is located in Emmet County, Michigan, United States, and in U.S. Coast Guard District No. 9. It is approximately 15 miles (24 km) west of Mackinaw City. Due to erosion and deterioration, the lighthouse is deteriorating and critically endangered, and likely to fall into the lake in the near future.

== Reason for lighthouse ==
Boats from Chicago heading North (and ultimately) East need to navigate the narrow tip of northern Lake Michigan, and there are many dangers. The area around Waugoshance Point is not only shallow, it is a large (in area) projection from the bottom of the lake. Boats large enough to safely travel in times of storm cannot approach the light closer than a few hundred yards.

Adding to the complication of navigation in this area is the White Shoal, located just north of Waugoshance. This area is currently protected by White Shoal Light—built in 1910, nearby, powerful and larger—and Grays Reef Light which rendered this lighthouse obsolete.

During the last half of the nineteenth century, this light marked the turning point for ships traveling through the Straits of Mackinac and along Lake Michigan's eastern shore between the mainland and the Beavers. With a depth of less than 12 feet (3.7 m) deep, it was one of the most dangerous parts of the Straits. Thereafter, a "Gray's Reef passage" became more typical because modern freighters require considerably more depth, so Waugoshance is bypassed about 2 miles (3.2 km) to the west.

== History ==
In 1832 the first lightvessel on the Great Lakes was placed here. That wooden lightship was the Lois McLain. In 1851 she was replaced by the Waugoshance Light, which stands in the area of the Wilderness State Park, and which remains one of the most hazardous areas near the Straits of Mackinac, Michigan. The last light vessel on the Great Lakes was the Lightship Huron.

The lighthouse at Waugoshance was arguably the first light built in the Great Lakes that was totally surrounded by water. Both its construction and its continued maintenance were rendered extremely hazardous by the severe weather conditions of the area. Waugoshance is at the northern end of the long fetch of "south-wester" waves on Lake Michigan; the wave action is amplified as they build upon the shoal.

The imposing crib structure was a first on the Great Lakes. The pier was reconstructed in 1870—a massive undertaking that was hampered by the ironic fact that the viable 'building season' is far shorter than even the normal operating season for the light—and used a "bird cage" lantern, which makes it one of only three built on the Great Lakes. The lantern originally held the first fourth order Fresnel lens on the Great Lakes.

Although the light is now gray in color, it was originally painted in four broad horizontal Red and white stripes as a Daymark. Its walls were encased in steel, and are 5½ feet thick at the bottom. The Waugoshance Light operated from 1851 until its deactivation in 1912, when it remained the property of the U.S. federal government. The encasement was similar to Big Sable Point Light, which was made from Cream City Brick, and also had to be encased in steel boilerplate to retard the deterioration.

Of particular note were the efforts of Lighthouse keepers who rang bells for many days, trying to ward mariners and their vessels off the shoal as they groped through the smoke from the many fires — 1871 Great Chicago Fire, Peshtigo Fire, Northern Michigan including large tracts around Manistee, Michigan, Western Michigan around Holland and the fire in the Thumb near Port Huron—that took place beginning October 8, 1871, casting an impenetrable pall across Lake Michigan for the better part of a week. However, many vessels were lost.

During World War II, the abandoned light was used by the U.S. Navy for bombing practice. The Lighthouse keeper's house and all of the wood framing in the lighthouse burned. The metal shell has fallen away. Today, the lighthouse "is considered one of the most endangered lighthouses in the world." It has been said that, ". . . . it is amazing that anything remains."

The light was the object of a thirty year long struggle to save it. The nonprofit Waugoschance Lighthouse Preservation Society was formed by Chris West, and they bought it from the Coast Guard. They performed intermittent repairs. However, given the deterioration during 2019 and 2020, due to rising water levels, the organization has given up. The structure has been given back to the Coast Guard. While the fans have now transmuted and formed an admiration society, they asked to remove and preserve the unique 'birdcage' cap. That request was denied.

== Current status ==
The light is listed on the National Register, Reference #83000841, Name of Listing: WAUGOSHANCE LIGHT STATION (U.S. COAST GUARD/GREAT LAKES TR). It is not on the state list inventory.

It is said to be both a "nautical gravestone" (because of the many wrecks in the vicinity) and on the "most endangered list" of lighthouses, being on the Lighthouse Digest "Doomsday List." It is one of five in Michigan; the remaining four are: Fourteen Mile Point Light, Gull Rock Light, Manitou Island Light and Poverty Island Light.

The Waugoshance Lighthouse Preservation Society was formed in 2000. It undertook preservation and restoration. The Society's "first priority [was] ... raising funds to stabilize the building." It solicitied funds to rebuild the light, and got an extended lease from the U.S. Coast Guard, so that restoration can continue. In 2009, under the terms of the National Historic Lighthouse Preservation Act the lighthouse was put up for public sale.

Another source reports, however, that "In 2009, [it was] deemed excess by the U.S. Coast Guard", so it was "offered at no cost to eligible entities, including federal, state, and local agencies, non-profit corporations, and educational organizations under the provisions of the National Historic Lighthouse Preservation Act of 2000."

In January 2021, the organization dedicated to the preservation of the lighthouse announced in a Facebook post that, owing to prohibitively high costs for long term preservation, the non-profit would be dissolving and that funds raised for preservation would be donated "to local organizations with similar missions." Just stabilizing the foundation would cost $300,000.

== Access ==
The lighthouse is closed to the public.

A private boat is recommended to see this light close up. These are, however, dangerous and open water over wide expanses far from shore and interlaced by shoals, so caution is advised. The structure is filled with cormorant guano, and anyone going onto the lighthouse has to disembark, swim, and take a ladder. Thus, entrance is daunting, if not impossible.

Chris West, founder of the lighthouse society, offers boat rides. He is the harbor master at the Mackinaw City Municipal Marina, and owns the "Ugly Anne Tour Company", which operates a converted lobster boat that was brought from Maine. He says that it is no longer a question of 'if' the light will fall into the lake, but rather is a question of 'when.'

Short of that, Shepler's Ferry Service out of Mackinaw City offers periodic lighthouse cruises in the summer season. Its "westbound Lighthouse Tour"—three hours more or less—includes passes by various lights, including Waugoshance Light, White Shoal Light, Wilderness State Park, Gray's Reef Light (originally built in 1891), and St. Helena Island Light. Schedules and rates are available from Shepler's.

Another alternative is to charter a seaplane to make a tour of the Mackinac Straits and environs.
