= White Shoal Light (Michigan) =

Lighthouse in Michigan, United States

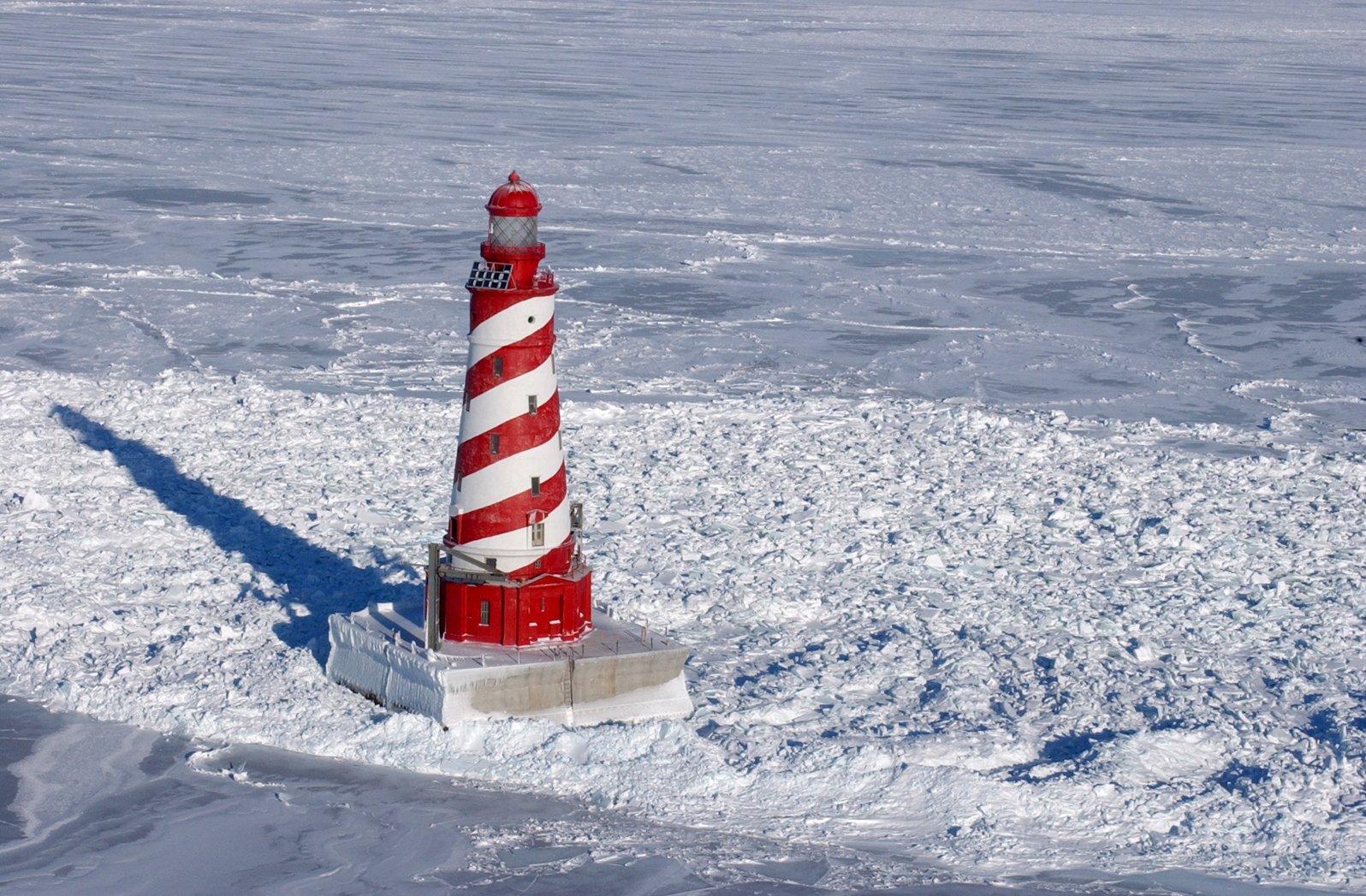
- Location: Lake Michigan west of the Straits of Mackinac, Emmet County, Michigan
- Coordinates: 45°50′32″N 85°8′7″W

Tower
- Foundation: cofferdam/timber exposed Crib pier/concrete pier.
- Construction: Terra Cotta//steel/brick interior; gunnite exterior; aluminium lantern
- Automated: 1976
- Height: 121 feet (37 m)
- Shape: Octagonal base on building; frustum of a cone.
- Markings: White orig./Red and White barber pole tower, red lantern & base
- Heritage: National Register of Historic Places listed place
- Fog signal: Diaphone originally, HORN 1 blast every 30", 3" blast. Operates year round.
- Racon: "K" (– • –).

Light
- First lit: 1910
- Focal height: 125 feet (38 m)
- Lens: 2nd order bivalve Fresnel Lens (original), 7.5-inch (190 mm) Tideland Signal acrylic lens (current)
- Intensity: 1.2 million candle power
- Range: 17 nautical miles (31 km; 20 mi)
- Characteristic: flashing 5 sec
- White Shoal Light Station
- U.S. National Register of Historic Places
- Nearest city: Mackinaw City, Michigan
- Area: 0.1 acres (0.040 ha)
- Architect: Judson, Major William V.
- MPS: U.S. Coast Guard Lighthouses and Light Stations on the Great Lakes TR
- NRHP reference No.: 84001391
- Added to NRHP: July 19, 1984

The White Shoal Light is a lighthouse located 20 miles (32 km) west of the Mackinac Bridge in Lake Michigan. It is an active aid to navigation. It is also the tallest lighthouse on the Great Lakes.

== History ==
=== Overview ===
The period between 1852 and the beginning of the 20th century saw great activity on the Great Lakes by the United States Lighthouse Board. Between 1852 and 1860 26 new lights were built. Even as the United States Civil War and its aftermath slowed construction, a dozen new lights were still lit in that decade. In the 1870s, 43 new lights were built on the Lakes. The 1880s saw more than one hundred lights constructed.

As the new century began, on the Great Lakes the Lighthouse Board operated 334 major lights, 67 fog horns and 563 buoys.

During the 19th century design of Great Lakes lights slowly evolved. Until 1870 the most common design was to build a keeper's dwelling with the light on the dwelling's roof or on a relatively small square tower attached to the house. In the 1870s, so as to raise lights to a higher focal plane, conical brick towers, usually between 80 and 100 feet tall were constructed. In the 1890s steel lined towers began to replace the older generation of brick building. See Big Sable Point Light for a striking transition and transformation.

The White Shoal Light was the culmination of a 40-year effort from 1870 to 1910, when engineers began to build lights on isolated islands, reefs, and shoals that were significant navigational hazards. To that time, Light ships were the only practical way to mark the hazards, but were dangerous for the sailors who crewed them, and were difficult to maintain. "Worse, regardless of the type of anchors used lightships could be blown off their expected location in severe storms, making them a potential liability in the worst weather when captains would depend on the charted location of these lights to measure their own ship's distance from dangerous rocks." See, United States lightship Huron (LV-103).

Successively, using underwater crib designs, the Board built on a shoal the Waugoshance Light (1851), and demonstrated a "new level of expertise" in constructing of the Spectacle Reef Light (1874), Stannard Rock Light (1882) and Detroit River (Bar Point Shoal) (also known as the Detroit River Entrance Light) (1885). "The long and expensive process of building lights" in remote and difficult sites "ended in nationally publicized engineering projects that constructed" Rock of Ages (1908) and the White Shoal (1910) lights.

In the first three decades of the 20th century the Lighthouse Board and the new Lighthouse Service continued to build new lights on the Great Lakes. For 1925, the Board had under its auspices around the Great Lakes 433 major lights, ten lightships, 129 fog signals and about 1,000 buoys. Of these 1,771 navigational aids, 160 stations had resident keepers, as most navigational aids were automated. By 1925 nearly all of the Great Lakes lighthouses that exist today had been constructed, except for Poe Reef Light, Gravelly Shoal Light, and Manning Memorial Light. Another is the William Livingtone Memorial Light, and the Great Lakes light, namely Tri-Centennial Light of Detroit.

This is part of a larger pattern of building 14 reef lights around Michigan, which was intended to help ships navigate through and around the shoals and hazards around the Straits of Mackinac.

=== Building the light ===
Construction of the crib style light began in 1908 and the light was commissioned on September 1, 1910. Final cost of light construction was $225,000.00 (although $250,000 was budgeted for this project). In addition to a fog signal, it also had a submersible bell that would toll the number "23" to warn off mariners. This early 20th Century technological innovation was an audible precursor to a mid Century innovation using radar, RACON, which was later installed at this location.

Because of growing freighter traffic in and through the Straits of Mackinac, this light was part of a larger plan to build lighthouses to protect ships and mariners in the area. This is one of the first three "lightship stations" of the Great Lakes. Its construction, along with Waugoshance Light, was a "major engineering feat" because of its distance and isolation from land. Until 1910, Lightship LV56 served at White Shoal. Construction for this light began in 1908: the crib pier being built in St. Ignace, and transported by ship. The keeper house was accompanied by a fog signal building that housed a diaphone, that has since been removed.

== Description ==
The tower was coated in gunnite after completion.

The lighthouse is unique:

1. The massive original lens was a 2nd Order Fresnel Lens manufactured by Barbier, Benard & Turenne of Paris. It had a "two-sided design known as a bi-valve configuration, with each side "featuring 7 refracting and 15 reflecting prisms." The lens floated on a bed of Mercury and was powered by a clockwork mechanism suspended in the tower. It had a range of up to 28 miles (45 km) and generated 1.2 million candle power. Similar lights were installed at Grosse Point Light (the only remaining 2nd Order Fresnel still in operation on the Great Lakes) and Rock of Ages Light. (Note: No First Order lenses were ever used on the Great Lakes.) It was automated in 1976. The original lens is on display at the Whitefish Point Light Museum.
2. It is the sole "aluminum-topped" lighthouse on the Great Lakes; most of the other lanterns are cast iron.
3. The highly visible diagonal Daymark paint job, sometimes described as red and white 'candy cane stripe', is the only 'barber pole' lighthouse in the United States. However, black and white helical daymarks do appear on Cape Hatteras Light and St. Augustine Light.
4. Consequently, the State of Michigan has used it as an icon to generate revenue.

The White Shoal Light is the prominent design element in the "Save Our Lights" license plate for the State of Michigan; the sale of which helps fund lighthouse preservation. Michigan is the only state that supports lighthouse preservation with a program that includes annual grants from the state to local preservation groups. Thus, there are many organizations and their volunteers working hard to save and restore lighthouses. The Michigan Lighthouse Conservancy is a state preservation society, and the Great Lakes Lighthouse Keepers Association is also based in the state.

White Shoal Light is one of over 150 past and present lighthouses in Michigan. Michigan has more lighthouses than any other state. See Lighthouses in the United States.

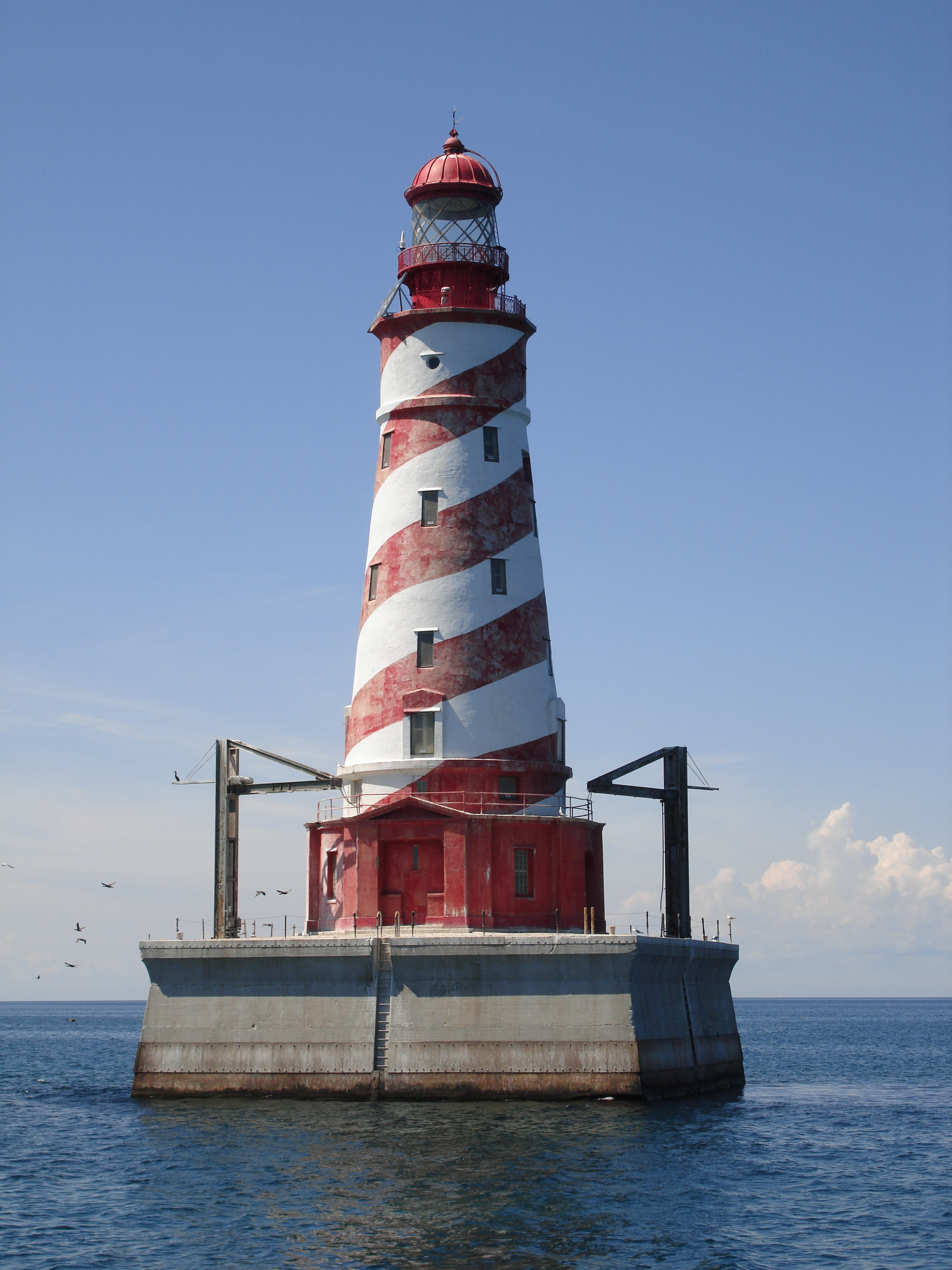
White Shoal Light

Because of its unique form and coloration, it is often the subject of photographs, drawings, and even of needlepoint illustrations.

== Popular culture ==
A scaled-down replica of this light was built on Lake Havasu at Lake Havasu City, Arizona. Located on the Lake Havasu Island Golf Course, the light is operational and was dedicated on November 2, 2008. It was sponsored by the families of John & Janet Roe & Eric & Sundin; built by Jack Hensley and Members of the Lake Havasu Lighthouse Club, dedicated "To the memory of Eric Sundin." It is located at 34°27.16′N 114°21.12′W, and has a red light that flashes sixty times per minute. See also List of lighthouses in the United States. It is considered to be iconic, and has been the subject of memorabilia.

== Seeing the light ==
The best way to see the light is through the White Shoal Light Historical Preservation Society, the current owners/caretakers of the light. They offer a variety of boat tours that are short or lasting 6 hours or more including meals, on-site options and overnight stays as a way to support the preservation of the lighthouse; these began on July 22, 2019.

A private boat is another way to see this light close up. Other commercial options would include Shepler's Ferry Service out of Mackinaw City offers periodic lighthouse cruises in the summer season. Its "westbound Lighthouse Tour" – three hours more or less – includes passes by various lights, including White Shoal Light, Waugoshance Light (which it replaced), Wilderness State Park, Gray's Reef Light (originally built in 1891), and St. Helena Island Light. A so-called grand lighthouse excursion is a yearly event sponsored through the Great Lakes Lightkeeper Association, and includes these and many other lights. Schedules and rates are available from Shepler's.

Another alternative is to charter a seaplane to make a tour of the Mackinac Straits and environs.

The lighthouse sold at auction through the GSA in September 2016. The winning bid of $110,009 was placed by the White Shoal Light Historical Preservation Society based in Traverse City, Michigan.
