= Grays Reef Light =

Lighthouse in Michigan, United States

Grays Reef Light Station
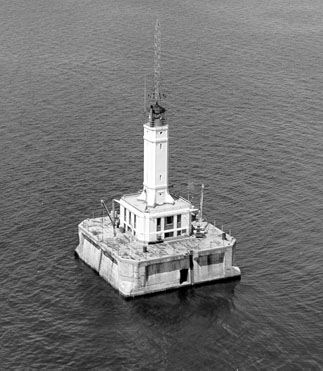
- Location: In northeastern Lake Michigan, 3.8 miles (6.1 km) west of Waugoshance Island
- Coordinates: 45°46′0″N 85°9′12″W

Tower
- Foundation: Submerged stone and concrete crib
- Construction: Steel, reinforced concrete
- Automated: 1976
- Height: 65 feet (20 m)
- Shape: Octagonal
- Markings: White with black lantern
- Heritage: National Register of Historic Places listed place
- Racon: G

Light
- First lit: 1936
- Focal height: 25 m (82 ft)
- Lens: Third and a half order Fresnel lens (original), 7.5-inch (190 mm) (current)
- Range: 15 nautical miles (28 km; 17 mi).
- Characteristic: Fl R 10s
- Grays Reef Light Station
- U.S. National Register of Historic Places
- Location: In northeastern Lake Michigan, 3.8 miles (6.1 km) west of Waugoshance Island
- Nearest city: Bliss Township, Michigan
- Area: 0.6 acres (0.24 ha)
- Built by: Greiling Brothers Company
- Architect: U.S. Lighthouse Service 11th Dist.; Office of Supt. of Lighthouses
- Architectural style: Art Deco
- MPS: Light Stations of the United States MPS
- NRHP reference No.: 05001210
- Added to NRHP: November 9, 2005

The Grays Reef Light is a lighthouse located in northeastern Lake Michigan, 3.8 miles (6.1 km) west of Waugoshance Island in Bliss Township, Michigan. It was listed on the National Register of Historic Places in 2005.

== History ==
In the 1880s, as shipments of iron ore increased through the Straits of Mackinac, shippers began advocating for better lighting of the shoals in the area. In 1889, Congress appropriated $60,000 to construct three lightvessels to be moored at Simmons Reef, White Shoals, and here at Grays Reef. The three vessels, designated LV55, LV56, and LV57, were constructed by Blythe Craig Shipbuilding of Toledo, Ohio, and were put in service in late 1891. LV57 served for every shipping season on Grays Reef until 1923, when its hull had deteriorated to a point where it was removed from service. LV103 (the Lightship Huron) served on Grays reef from 1923–27, when LV56 was transferred to the station. LV56 lasted only two years until it, too deteriorated enough to be removed from service. LV103 was returned to Grays Reef for the first part of the 1929 season, and was then replaced with LV99.

By this time, with improvements in underwater construction, it had become feasible to construct a permanent light station on Grays Reef, rather than depending on a moored lightvessel. In 1934, Congress approved funding for a new station. The Greiling Brothers Company was hired to construct the light station, and work began in the summer of 1934. The structure was finished in September 1936, two months behind schedule and over budget.

In 1937, a radio beacon and 40 feet (12 m) tower was installed at the station; the tower was removed in 2010. In 1939, the United States Coast Guard took over operational control. The lighthouse was staffed until 1976, when a solar-powered system was installed. The lighthouse now has a 7.5-inch (190 mm) 12-volt DC acrylic Tideland Signal optic.

== Description ==
The Grays Reef Light is built to exactly the same plan as the Minneapolis Shoal Light, built at approximately the same time. The design is a modification of one created by F. P. Dillon and W. G. Will, which was used in Conneaut, Ohio and Huron, Ohio.

The light sits on a square reinforced concrete pier, 30 feet (9.1 m) high and 64 feet (20 m) on a side. Atop the pier is a two-story base, 15-foot (4.6 m) high and 30 feet (9.1 m) on a side. The cellar and first floor in the base were built to house diesel generators, boilers, and compressors to provide power and heat to the light, fog signal, and keeper's quarters. The second floor of the base housed the keeper's quarters. The lighthouse tower is placed in the center of the building roof. The tower is 65 feet (20 m) tall, and tapers from 16 feet (4.9 m) at the base to 10 feet (3.0 m) beneath the gallery. The entire light is covered on the exterior with steel plates. The lantern atop the tower has helical astragals, and housed a red 3-1/2 order Fresnel lens.
