= Bois Blanc =

Bois Blanc may refer to:

- One of two islands in the Great Lakes:
  - Bois Blanc Island (Michigan)
  - Bois Blanc Island (Ontario)
- Bois Blanc Township, Michigan, United States
  - Bois Blanc Pines School District
- Bois Blanc Light, on the island in Michigan
- Bois Blanc Island Lighthouse and Blockhouse, National Historic Site of Canada, on the island in Ontario
