= St. James, Michigan =

- Census-designated place (CDP) & unincorporated community
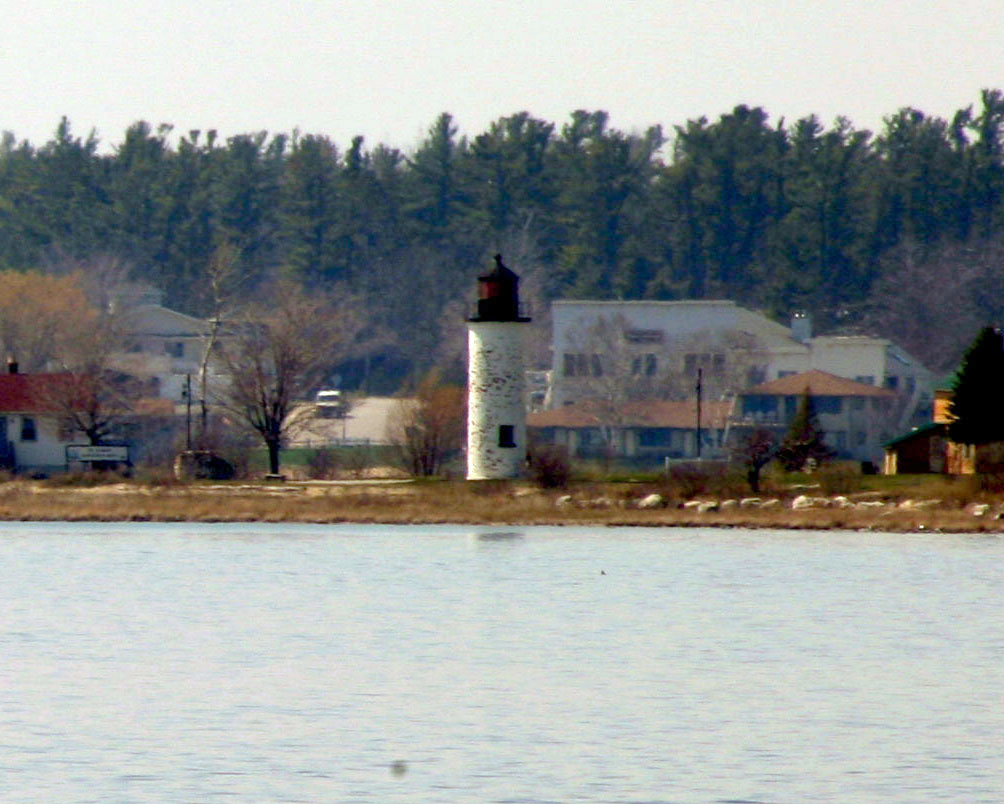
- Beaver Island Harbor Light

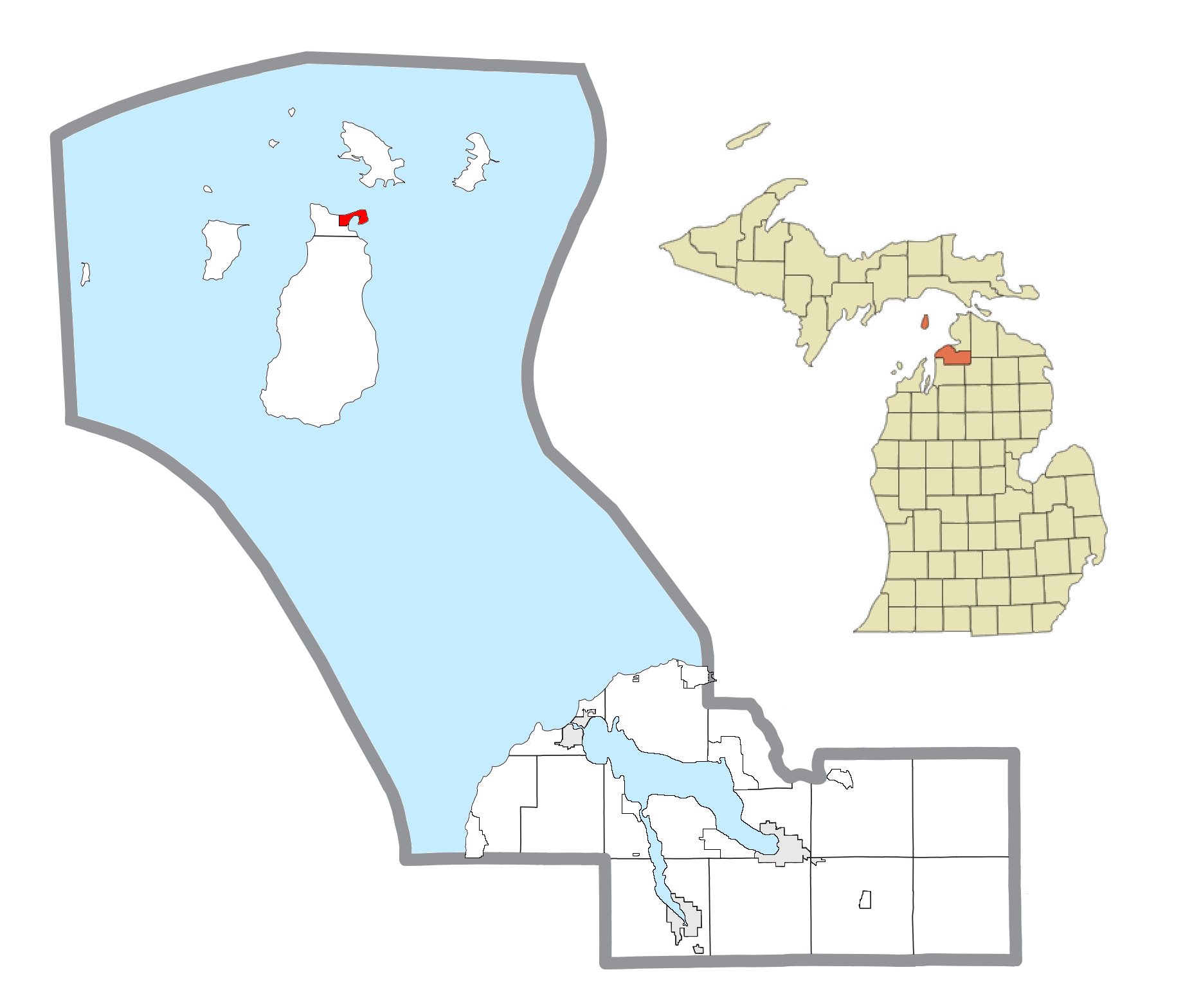
- Location within Charlevoix County

- Location within the state of Michigan Location within the United States
- Coordinates: 45°44′47″N 85°31′18″W
- Country: United States
- State: Michigan
- County: Charlevoix
- Township: St. James

Area
  - Total: 1.03 sq mi (2.67 km^{2})
  - Land: 1.03 sq mi (2.67 km^{2})
  - Water: 0.0039 sq mi (0.01 km^{2})
- Elevation: 604 ft (184 m)

Population (2020)
  - Total: 145
  - Density: 140.9/sq mi (54.41/km^{2})
- Time zone: UTC-5 (Eastern (EST))
  - Summer (DST): UTC-4 (EDT)
- ZIP code(s): 49782 (Beaver Island)
- Area code: 231
- FIPS code: 26-70900
- GNIS feature ID: 0636683

St. James is an unincorporated community and census-designated place (CDP) in Charlevoix County in the U.S. state of Michigan. The population of the CDP was 145 at the 2020 census. The community is located within St. James Township.

Located on the northern coast of Beaver Island in Lake Michigan, St. James was the county seat of Manitou County during the county's existence from 1855 to 1895.

== History ==
The community was settled as early as 1847 when James Jesse Strang took over his Mormon church and settled his colony on Beaver Island. Originally part of Michilimackinac County, it received a post office named Beaver Island on January 13, 1849, with Charles Wright serving as the first postmaster. Strang named the new community after himself, and the post office was renamed St. James on October 10, 1854, when it became part of Emmet County. Strang declared himself to be a king—the only king ever crowned in the United States. After Strang's murder in 1856 by disgruntled followers, the community began to fold, and the post office closed on March 6, 1868. Charles Wright restored the post office under the name Beaver Island on December 19, 1868, and served again as postmaster. During the 1870s, St. James was also referred as Beaver Harbor. By 1895, the Mormons left the island, and St. James became part of Charlevoix County. It is now a resort community.

The community of St. James was listed as a newly organized census-designated place for the 2010 census, meaning it now has officially defined boundaries and population statistics for the first time.

== Geography ==
According to the U.S. Census Bureau, the St. James CDP has a total area of 1.03 square miles (2.67 km^{2}), all land.

St. James is located in St. James Township at the northern end of Beaver Island, the largest island in Lake Michigan. The center of town faces southeast onto St. James Harbor, through which the Beaver Island Ferry arrives from Charlevoix. The northeastern side of the entrance to the harbor is marked by the Beaver Island Harbor Light. The St. James CDP extends east about 0.5 miles (0.8 km) to Lookout Point and Sucker Point, marking the northeastern end of the island.

== Demographics ==
Historical population
Census	Pop.	Note	%±
2010	205		—
2020	145		−29.3%
U.S. Decennial Census

== Education ==
St. James is served entirely by Beaver Island Community School. The Beaver Island Community School is located within St. James and serves the entire district. It is one of only four insular school districts in the state, along with Bois Blanc Pines School District, Grosse Ile Township Schools, and Mackinac Island School District.
