= St. James Township, Michigan =

- Civil township
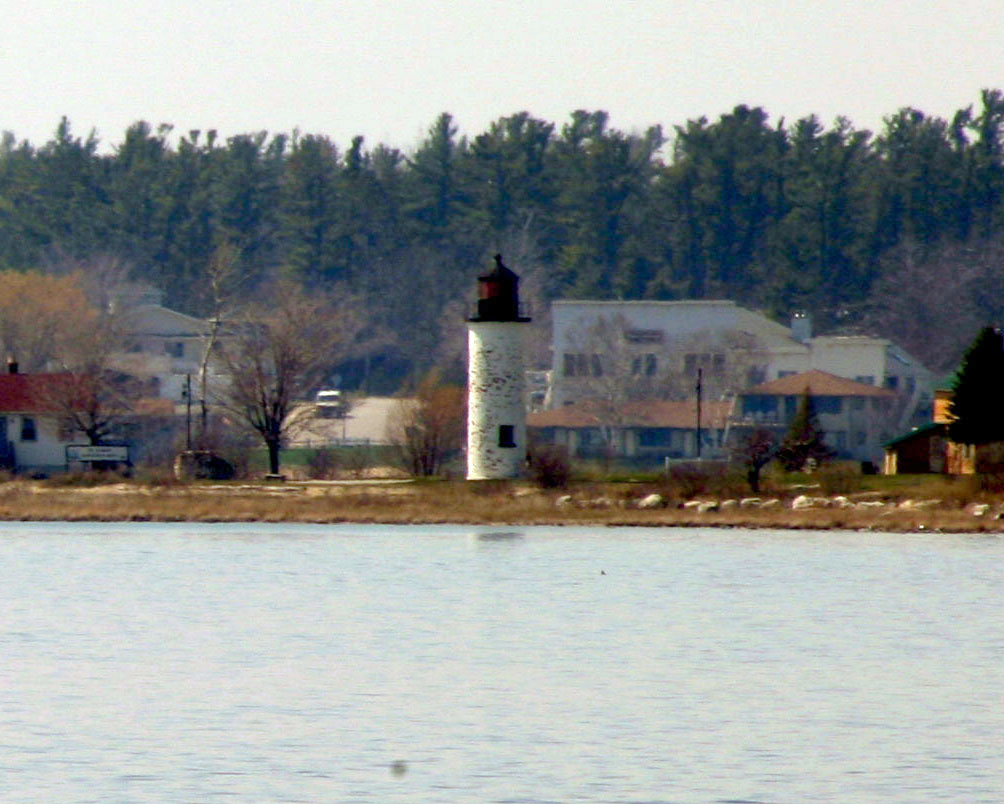
- Beaver Island Harbor Light

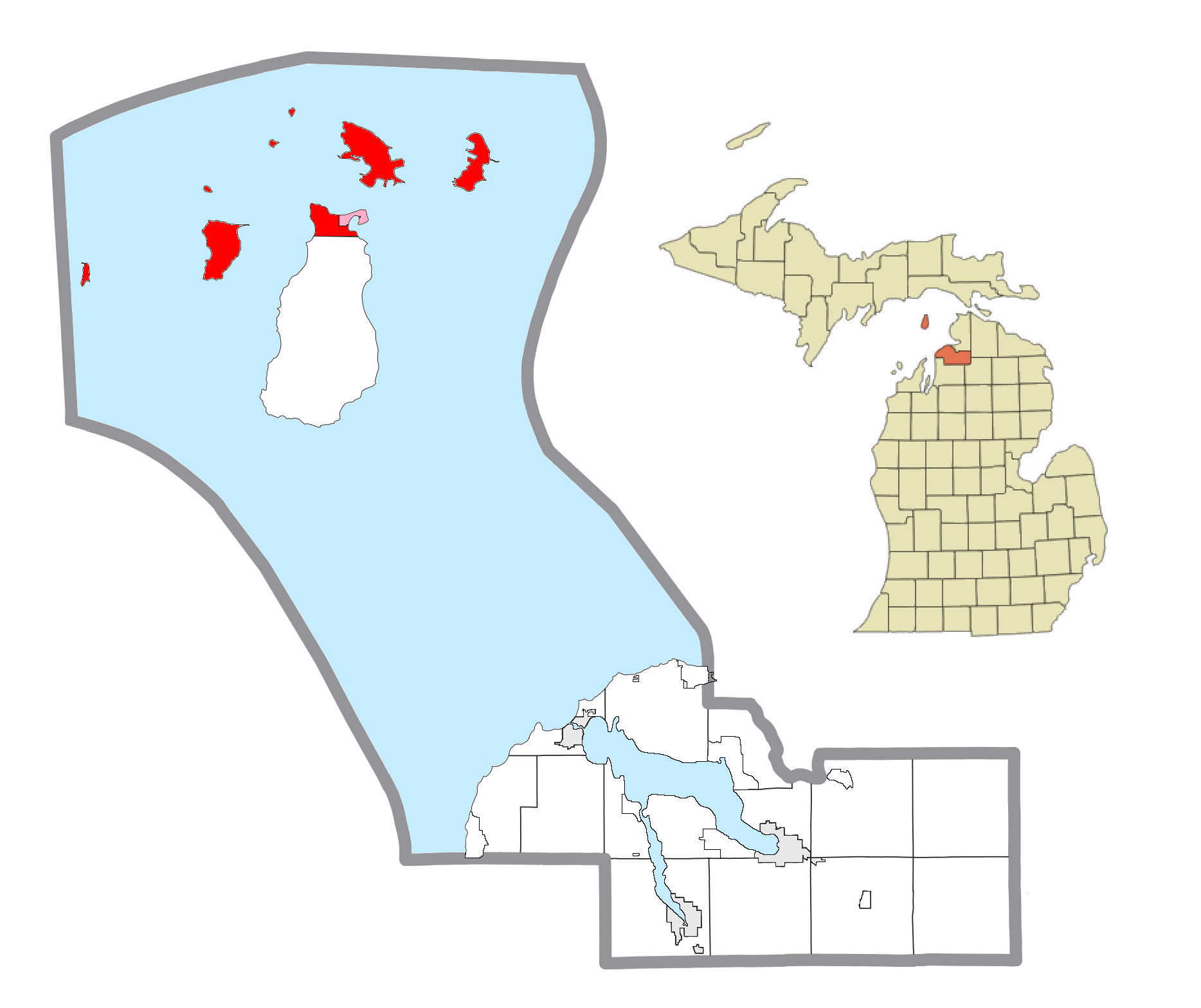
- Location within Charlevoix County (red) and the administered CDP of St. James (pink)

- Location within the state of Michigan Location within the United States
- Coordinates: 45°45′19″N 85°32′56″W
- Country: United States
- State: Michigan
- County: Charlevoix

Government
  - Supervisor: Roberta Welke
  - Clerk: Julie Gillespie

Area
  - Total: 315.90 sq mi (818.18 km^{2})
  - Land: 20.35 sq mi (52.71 km^{2})
  - Water: 295.55 sq mi (765.47 km^{2})
- Elevation: 581 ft (177 m)

Population (2020)
  - Total: 259
  - Density: 12.7/sq mi (4.91/km^{2})
- Time zone: UTC-5 (Eastern (EST))
  - Summer (DST): UTC-4 (EDT)
- ZIP code(s): 49782 (Beaver Island)
- Area code: 231
- FIPS code: 26-70920
- GNIS feature ID: 1627029
- Website: Official website

St. James Township is a civil township of Charlevoix County in the U.S. state of Michigan. The population was 259 at the 2020 census.

== Communities ==
- Beaver Island is an unincorporated community at the northern end of Beaver Island. The island was named for the numerous beavers that once populated it. A post office named Beaver Island opened on January 13, 1849. The name of the post office was changed to St. James from October 10, 1854 until it closed on March 6, 1868. It was restored under the name Beaver Island on December 19, 1868 and remains in operation. The Beaver Island 49782 ZIP Code serves the entirely of the island, including all of Peaine and St. James townships, as well as several uninhabited outlying islands. The current post office is located at 26135 Main Street.
- High Island is a former settlement that occupied High Island just west of Beaver Island. A post office named High Island opened on June 5, 1913 as a rural branch of Beaver Island with Gladys Hill serving as the first postmaster. The post office is no longer in operation, and the island is now uninhabited.
- St. James is an unincorporated community and census-designated place located at the northern end of Beaver Island at 45°45′04″N 85°30′56″W.

== History ==
The township was named for James Strang, who led a faction of Mormon settlers to Beaver Island in 1848. Producing mysterious brass plates from the ground, and allegedly receiving directives from God, Strang formed a colony on Beaver Island in 1848 called St. James, naming it after himself. Strang led those who accepted him to Nauvoo, Illinois, and then Voree, Wisconsin, before deciding that God wanted him to bring his flock to Beaver Island. Claiming to have been appointed by Joseph Smith Jr. to lead his church after his death, James J. Strang presided over the Church of Jesus Christ of Latter Day Saints (Strangite) from 1844 until his murder in 1856.

== Geography ==
According to the U.S. Census Bureau, the township has a total area of 315.90 square miles (818.18 km^{2}), of which 20.35 square miles (52.71 km^{2}) is land and 295.55 square miles (765.47 km^{2}) (93.56%) is water.

St. James Township is one of only seven municipalities in the state of Michigan to consist entirely of islands, including Grosse Ile Township, Drummond Township, Bois Blanc Township, Mackinac Island, Peaine Township, and Sugar Island Township. St. James Township occupies the northern portion of Beaver Island and shares the islands with Peaine Township. St. James Township consists of the following islands in Lake Michigan, in which only Beaver Island has a permanent population. Most of the township's population lives in the unincorporated community of St. James at the northeastern end of Beaver Island.

=== Islands ===
- Beaver Island
- Garden Island
- Gull Island
- Hat Island
- High Island
- Hog Island
- Horseshoe Island
- Little Island
- Pismire Island
- Shoe Island
- Ojibwa Island
- Trout Island
- Whiskey Island

== Demographics ==
As of the census of 2000, there were 307 people, 138 households, and 82 families residing in the township. The population density was 15.4 per square mile (5.9/km^{2}). There were 331 housing units at an average density of 16.6 per square mile (6.4/km^{2}). The racial makeup of the township was 98.70% White, and 1.30% Native American.

There were 138 households, out of which 24.6% had children under the age of 18 living with them, 55.1% were married couples living together, 5.1% had a female householder with no husband present, and 39.9% were non-families. 34.8% of all households were made up of individuals, and 13.8% had someone living alone who was 65 years of age or older. The average household size was 2.22 and the average family size was 2.93.

In the township the population was spread out, with 24.4% under the age of 18, 2.9% from 18 to 24, 21.2% from 25 to 44, 29.0% from 45 to 64, and 22.5% who were 65 years of age or older. The median age was 46 years. For every 100 females, there were 91.9 males. For every 100 females age 18 and over, there were 95.0 males.

The median income for a household in the township was $33,182, and the median income for a family was $46,250. Males had a median income of $33,000 versus $20,682 for females. The per capita income for the township was $20,109. About 5.6% of families and 6.6% of the population were below the poverty line, including 5.5% of those under the age of eighteen and none of those 65 or over.

== Education ==
St. James Township is served entirely by Beaver Island Community School. The Beaver Island Community School is located within St. James Township and serves the entire district. It is one of only four insular school districts in the state, along with Bois Blanc Pines School District, Grosse Ile Township Schools, and Mackinac Island School District.
