= Peaine Township, Michigan =

- Civil township
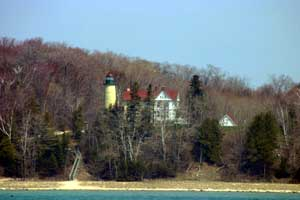
- The deactivated Beaver Island Head Light

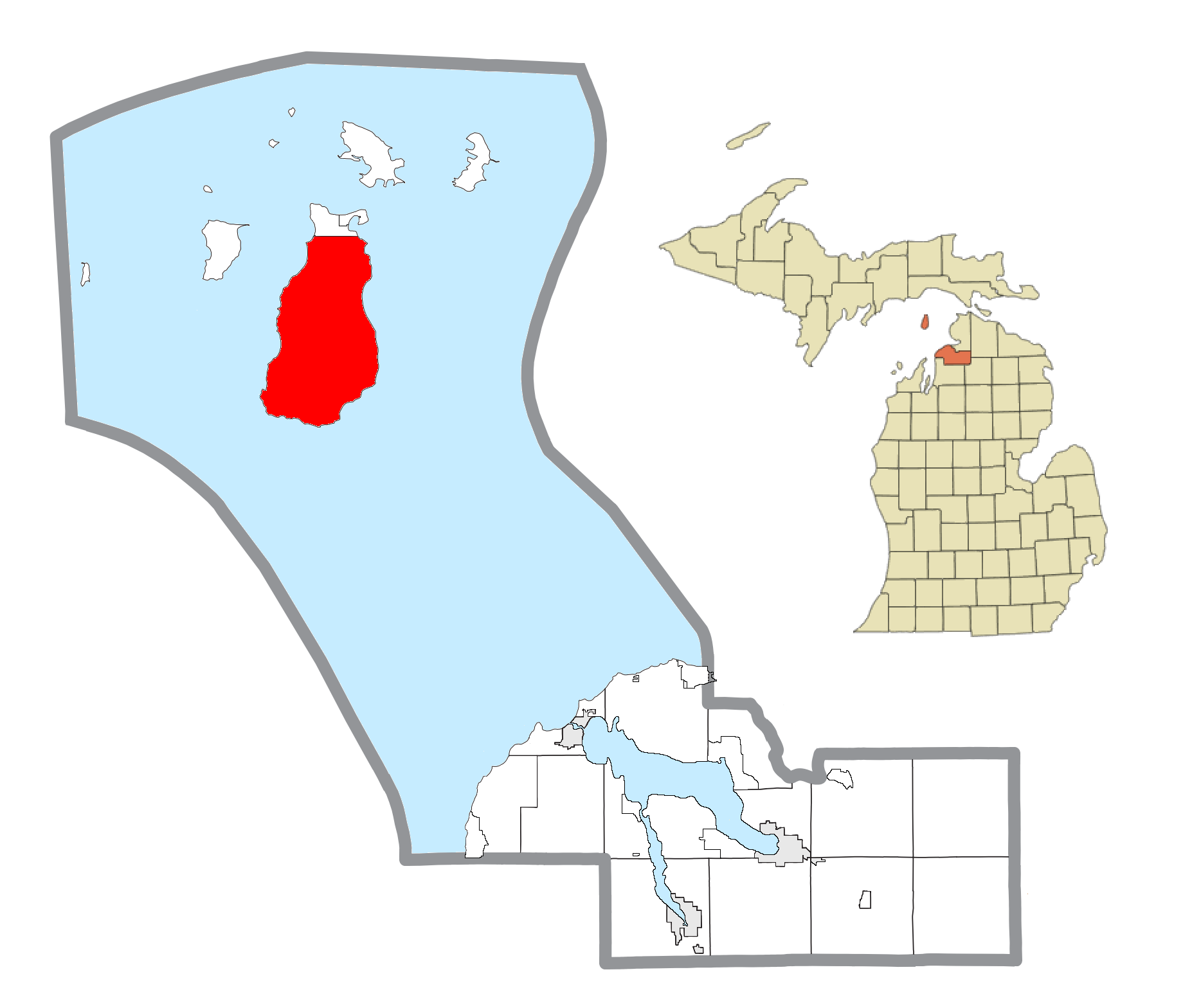
- Location within Charlevoix County

- Location within the state of Michigan Location within the state of Michigan
- Coordinates: 45°40′17″N 85°33′49″W
- Country: United States
- State: Michigan
- County: Charlevoix

Government
  - Supervisor: Doug Tilly
  - Clerk: Carla Martin

Area
  - Total: 73.03 sq mi (189.15 km^{2})
  - Land: 52.35 sq mi (135.59 km^{2})
  - Water: 20.68 sq mi (53.56 km^{2})
- Elevation: 673 ft (205 m)

Population (2020)
  - Total: 266
  - Density: 5.08/sq mi (1.96/km^{2})
- Time zone: UTC-5 (Eastern (EST))
  - Summer (DST): UTC-4 (EDT)
- ZIP code(s): 49782 (Beaver Island)
- Area code: 231
- FIPS code: 26-63140
- GNIS feature ID: 1626888
- Website: Official website

Peaine Township is a civil township of Charlevoix County in the U.S. state of Michigan. The population was 266 at the 2020 census.

The township occupies the southern portion of Beaver Island in Lake Michigan.

== Communities ==
- Bonner Landing is an unincorporated community located within the township at 45°42′15″N 85°34′46″W.
- Martins Bluff is an unincorporated community located on the eastern shores of Beaver Island at 45°38′11″N 85°29′17″W.
- Nomad is an unincorporated community located within the township along the southeast coast of Beaver Island at 45°35′42″N 85°30′54″W. The settlement began around the Nomad Shingle Company mill, operated by Evart Cole. Julie Cole became the first postmaster when the Nomad post office opened on March 10, 1917. The post office operated until October 31, 1933.

== History ==
The Ottawa and the Ojibwe people originally lived in the area. James Strang and the Church of Jesus Christ of Latter Day Saints (Strangite) lived on the island in the 1850s.

== Geography ==
According to the U.S. Census Bureau, the township has a total area of 73.03 square miles (189.15 km^{2}), of which 52.35 square miles (135.59 km^{2}) is land and 20.68 square miles (53.56 km^{2}) (28.32%) is water.

The township occupies all but the northern tip of Beaver Island, with St. James Township bordering Peaine Township to the north. Peaine Township is one of only seven municipalities in the state of Michigan to consist entirely of islands, including Grosse Ile Township, Drummond Township, Bois Blanc Township, Mackinac Island, St. James Township, and Sugar Island Township.

== Demographics ==
As of the census of 2000, there were 244 people, 120 households, and 72 families residing in the township. The population density was 4.7 per square mile (1.8/km^{2}). There were 410 housing units at an average density of 7.8 per square mile (3.0/km^{2}). The racial makeup of the township was 97.95% White, 0.82% Native American, and 1.23% from two or more races. Hispanic or Latino of any race were 0.41% of the population.

There were 120 households, out of which 13.3% had children under the age of 18 living with them, 50.0% were married couples living together, 7.5% had a female householder with no husband present, and 40.0% were non-families. 34.2% of all households were made up of individuals, and 6.7% had someone living alone who was 65 years of age or older. The average household size was 2.03 and the average family size was 2.58.

In the township the population was spread out, with 16.0% under the age of 18, 5.7% from 18 to 24, 19.3% from 25 to 44, 38.5% from 45 to 64, and 20.5% who were 65 years of age or older. The median age was 50 years. For every 100 females, there were 103.3 males. For every 100 females age 18 and over, there were 101.0 males.

The median income for a household in the township was $29,167, and the median income for a family was $31,250. Males had a median income of $37,083 versus $19,000 for females. The per capita income for the township was $33,091. About 4.5% of families and 8.2% of the population were below the poverty line, including none of those under the age of eighteen and 5.9% of those 65 or over.

As of the 2020 Michigan Township Census, the township had a population of 266. In 2021, the population rose to 284.

The median age, as of 2021, is 67.6 years. There are around 153 households, and the median household income is $61,875. The income per capita is $46,788, and about 8.8% of people were below the poverty line.

== Education ==
Peaine Township is served entirely by Beaver Island Community School. It is one of only four insular school districts in the state, along with Bois Blanc Pines School District, Grosse Ile Township Schools, and Mackinac Island School District.

As of 2021, about 98.8% of residents hold at least a high school diploma. 49.8% have a bachelor's degree or higher.
