= Manitou County, Michigan =

Former county in Michigan

Manitou County was an insular county in the U.S. state of Michigan, consisting of Beaver Island and its surrounding islands, together with the North and South Manitou Islands and Fox Islands in Lake Michigan. The county existed from 1855 to 1895. The county seat was at St. James on Beaver Island.

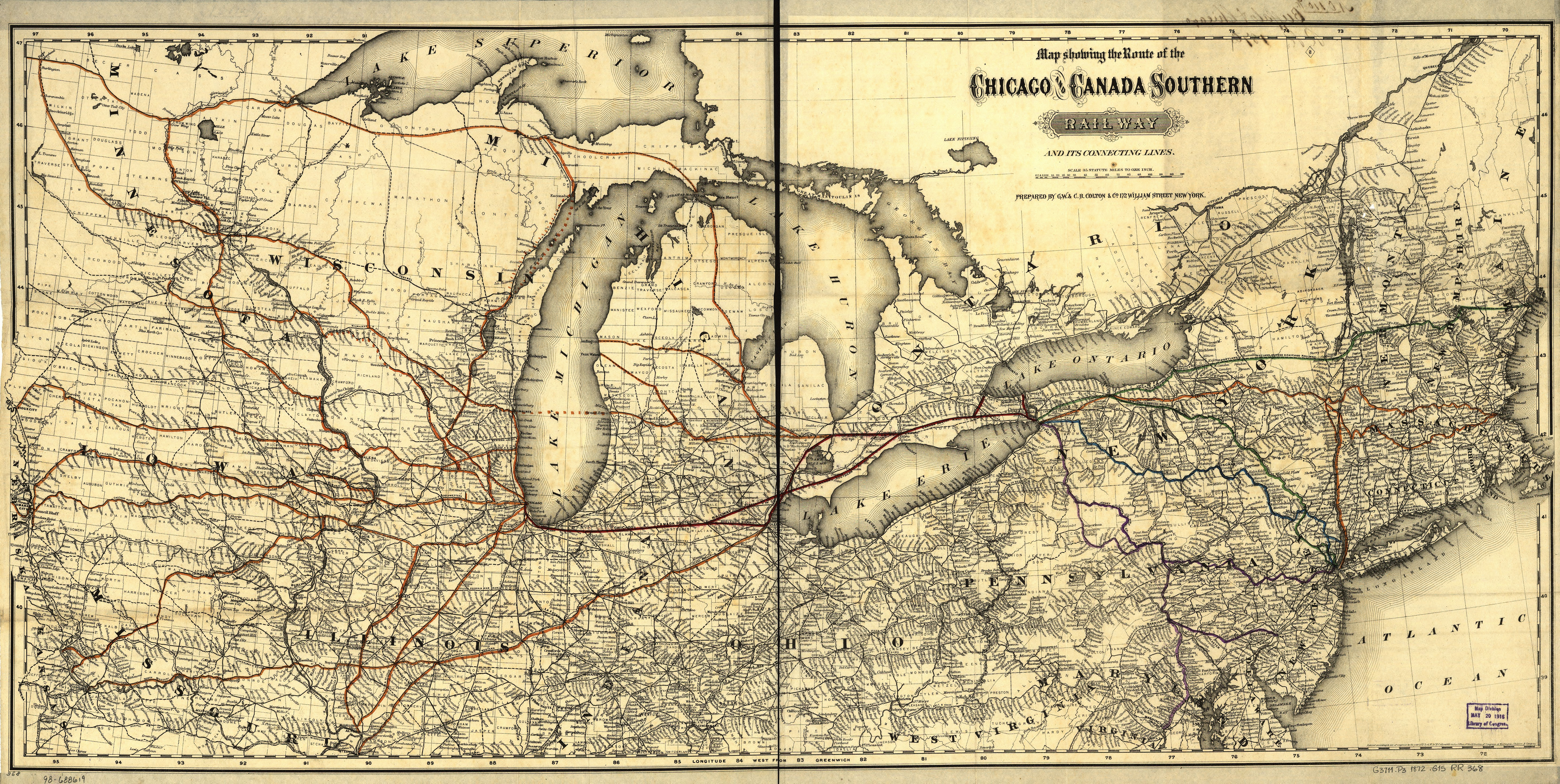
In this 1872 map, one can see the three clusters of islands that comprised Manitou County: the Beaver Island Archipelago (labeled), then Fox Islands (north of Leelanau county), and North Manitou Island & South Manitou Island (to the left of Northport)

== Before 1855: islands attached to mainland counties ==
Before the 1836 Treaty of Washington extinguished Native American claims to most of the land in the northwest part of Northern Michigan, the islands were nominally a part of Michilimackinac County (later renamed Mackinac County). In 1840, that portion of Mackinac County lying in the lower peninsula was divided into counties that remained attached for administrative purposes to Mackinac. The Manitou Islands were a part of Leelanau County, while the Beaver Island group was a part of Tonedagana County (quickly renamed Emmet County). In 1853, county government was organized in Emmet County, and the administrative attachment of Leelanau County was changed to Grand Traverse County, Michigan.

In 1847, James J. Strang, a leader in the Latter-day Saint movement, established a colony on Beaver Island. Strang crowned himself king of his church in 1850, and he was also elected to the Michigan House of Representatives in 1853 and again in 1855. Due in large part to fear of and animosity towards Strang's religious sect and concerns over the political strength his following gave him, petitions were presented to the legislature to detach Beaver and the Fox Islands from Emmet and form them into a separate county. This was granted in 1855. The Manitou Islands were included in the new county and gave it their name, despite being nearly unpopulated at the time.

== 1855-1895: organization of the county ==
In 1855, the Manitou Islands were organized as Chandler Township and the Fox Islands as Galilee Township, while the Beaver Islands became Peaine Township. The northern tip of Peaine Township later became St. James Township.

"King Strang" was assassinated in 1856, and in what historian Byron M. Cutcheon would call the "most disgraceful day in Michigan history", Strang's nearly 2,600 Latter Day Saint subjects were driven forcibly from Beaver Island by non-Mormons. With the Mormon population gone, the civil government of Manitou County was abandoned, and Manitou was attached in 1861 to Mackinac County. In 1865, the attachment was changed to Leelanau County, which had been organized in 1863. The attachment was switched back to Mackinac in 1869.

== After 1895: islands reattached to mainland counties ==
The first attempt to disestablish Manitou County occurred in January 1877, when retiring governor John J. Bagley urged the Legislature to do so: “I submit herewith petitions and correspondence relative to the affairs in the county of Manitou. They show that the laws of the State and the United States are violated with impunity, and that there is no safety or protection to persons or property in portions of this county. No courts have been held for years. The county offices are vacant a large portion of the time, there is no jail, debts cannot be collected by process of law, nor are any of the forms of law complied with. I recommend the county organization be discontinued and the territory be attached to the county of Charlevoix.” No action was taken at the time, but when the issue came up again in 1895, the Legislature agreed and made the Beaver Islands part of Charlevoix County and the Manitou and Fox Islands part of Leelanau County.

At the time of its extinction, the population of Manitou County was 917, with a total of 177 on the Manitou and Fox Islands and 740 on the Beaver Islands. South Manitou Island became part of Glen Arbor Township, North Manitou was made part of Leland Township, and the Fox Islands were made part of Leelanau Township. The two Beaver Island townships still exist.

== See also ==
- Church of Jesus Christ of Latter Day Saints (Strangite)
- History of Northern Michigan
- List of former United States counties
