= Whiskey Island =

Whiskey Island may refer to:

- Whiskey Island (Cleveland), Ohio, a peninsula
- Whiskey Island (Lake Michigan), Michigan
- Whiskey Island, a literary journal published by Cleveland State University
