= Cheboygan =

Cheboygan may refer to a location in the United States:

- Cheboygan, Michigan, the city
- Cheboygan County, Michigan
- Cheboygan High School
- Cheboygan River
- Cheboygan Point in Lake Huron near the city of Cheboygan
- Cheboygan State Park near the city of Cheboygan

== See also ==
- Sheboygan (disambiguation)
