= Bois Blanc Island =

There are two islands known as Bois Blanc in North America:

- Bois Blanc Island (Michigan) located near Mackinac Island
- Bois Blanc Island (Ontario), commonly called Boblo Island, had an amusement park until 1993.
