= Poe Reef Light =

Lighthouse in Michigan, United States

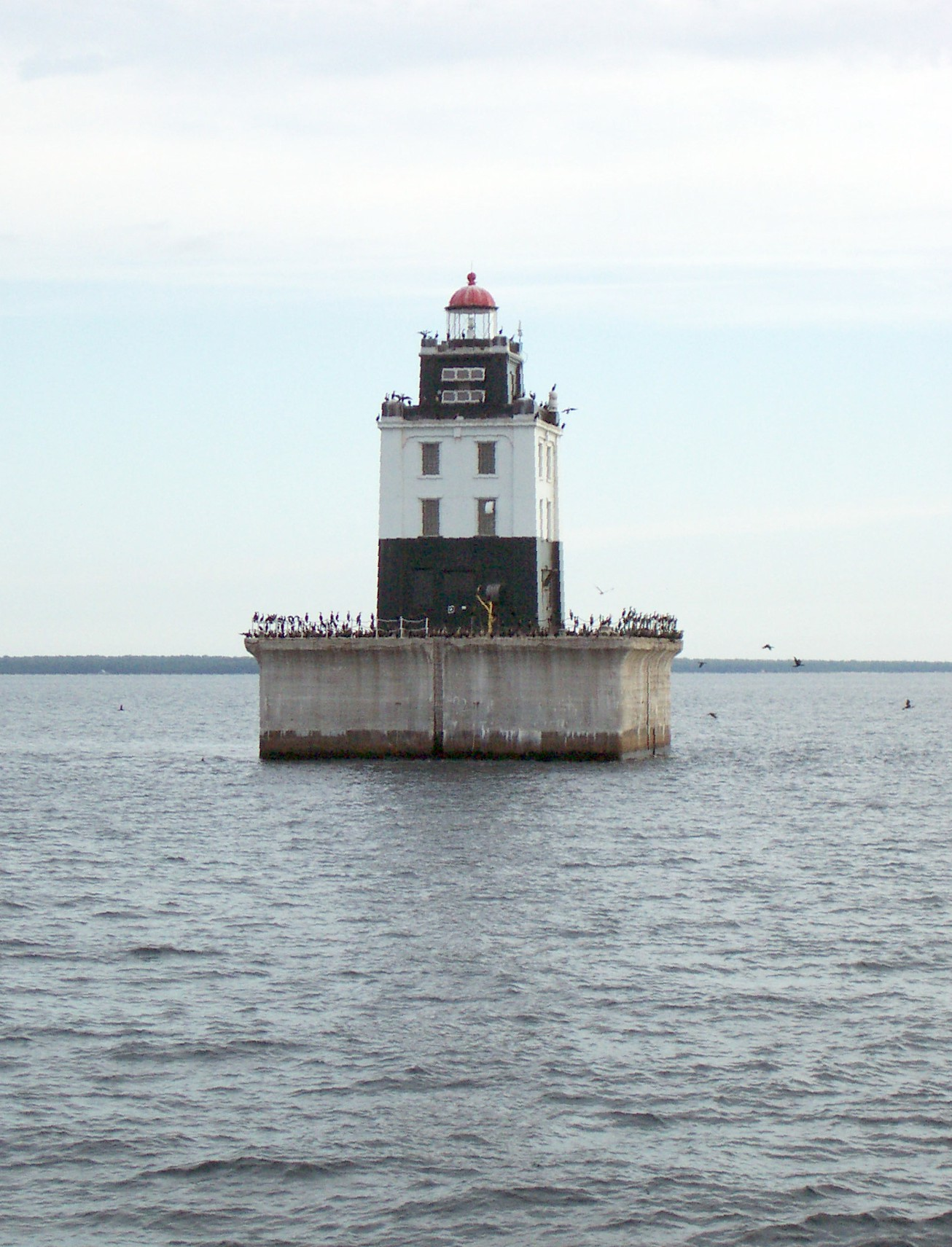
- The light in 2001
- Location: Lake Huron, Michigan
- Coordinates: 45°41′42″N 84°21′42″W

Tower
- Constructed: 1929
- Built by: Orlando Metcalfe Poe
- Foundation: Concrete crib
- Construction: Concrete
- Automated: 1974
- Height: 56 feet (17 m)
- Shape: Square
- Markings: White & black daymark bands w/red roof on lanternConcrete
- Heritage: National Register of Historic Places listed place
- Fog signal: HORN: 1 every 30s
- Racon: "Z" (– – • •)

Light
- First lit: 1929
- Focal height: 71 feet (22 m)
- Lens: Third order Fresnel Lens (original), 14.8-inch (375 mm) Tideland Signal acrylic Optic (current)
- Range: 9 nautical miles (17 km; 10 mi)
- Characteristic: Iso W 2s
- Poe Reef Light Station
- U.S. National Register of Historic Places
- Nearest city: Benton Township, Michigan
- Area: 0.9 acres (0.36 ha)
- Architect: U.S. Lighthouse Service
- Architectural style: Modern Movement
- MPS: Light Stations of the United States MPS
- NRHP reference No.: 05000985
- Added to NRHP: September 06, 2005

Poe Reef is a lighthouse located at the east end of South Channel between Bois Blanc Island and the mainland of the Lower Peninsula, about 6 miles (9.7 km) east of Cheboygan, Michigan.

Poe Reef has historically caused problems for shipping. Powered vessels heading west to Lake Michigan generally use South Channel, which is approximately three nautical miles wide, but Poe Reef sits close to the middle of the channel, and to the north of it the water is too shallow for lake freighters.

== History ==
Many attempts were made to position a lightship here but it was difficult. Four different lightships served beginning in 1893: Lightships Nos. 62, 59, 96, and No. 99.

The Poe Reef Light was an extension of the effort—beginning in 1870 through 1910—where engineers began to build lights on isolated islands, reefs, and shoals that were significant navigational hazards. Until that time, Light ships were the only practical way to mark the hazards, but were dangerous for the sailors who manned them, and difficult to maintain. "Worse, regardless of the type of anchors used lightships could be blown off their expected location in severe storms, making them a potential liability in the worst weather when captains would depend on the charted location of these lights to measure their own ship's distance from dangerous rocks." See, United States lightship Huron (LV-103).

=== Construction and operation ===
The Poe Reef is one of several that mark the passage through the South Channel. The other major light is Fourteen Foot Shoal Light. The decision was made by the United States Lighthouse Service in 1926 to construct a permanent light here. The Poe Reef Light was completed in 1928.

The Poe Reef Light is part of what became a complex of 14 reef lights in Michigan waters, which was intended to help ships navigate through and around the shoals and hazards of the Great Lakes. It is also "part of a series of a significant offshore light construction projects being undertaken in the Straits area in the late 1920s." The same crew that built this light also built St. Martin's Light from almost the same plan.

The Poe Reef lighthouse marks the north side of the South Channel of the Straits of Mackinac, while the Fourteen Foot Shoal Light marks the south side of the channel. Most sailing vessels had used the channel on the north side of Bois Blanc Island, but the growth of steamboat traffic increased use of the South Channel.

The Poe Reef Light shares designs with a twin, Martin Reef Light (all white, however, and with different windows in the fourth floor), which was built in 1927 by the same construction crew. The Poe lighthouse was originally painted all white, which sometimes confused mariners because they shared colors and a common structural design. Thus, a decision was made to paint Poe in contrasting bands.

The Poe Reef station was designed so that the onsite crew could also remotely operate the Fourteen Foot Shoal Light. Subsequently, both lights have been fully automated. The Poe Reef diaphone fog horn is still in current service.

In 2005, the Poe Reef Light lighthouse was listed on the National Register of Historic Places and the parallel state inventory of historic sites.

=== Orlando Poe legacy ===
The reef and light are named for lighthouse designer Orlando M. Poe. During ten years of service as Engineer for the Eleventh Lighthouse District he designed eight lighthouses, namely: New Presque Isle Light (1870) on Lake Huron; Lake Michigan's South Manitou Island Light (1872); Grosse Point Lighthouse (1873) in Evanston, Illinois; Au Sable Light (1874) on Lake Superior; Wind Point Light (1880) near Racine, Wisconsin; Outer Island Light (1874) in the Apostle Islands; Little Sable Point Light (1874) on Lake Michigan, and Seul Choix Light near Manistique, Michigan which was completed in 1895; and his crowning achievement, Spectacle Reef Light. Others consider his "crowning achievement" to be the Poe Lock in Sault Ste. Marie, Michigan.

== Getting there ==
The closest mainland location to the lighthouse is Cordwood Point, a privately developed summer settlement east of Cheboygan. The lighthouse is visible from Lighthouse Point near the ruins of the Cheboygan Main Light Station in Cheboygan State Park and that locale will provide an opportunity for a picture, albeit from approximately 3 miles (4.8 km). Another location from which the Poe Reef Light can be seen from land is from Gordon Turner Park, in Cheboygan, Michigan, at the mouth of the Cheboygan River.

A private boat is one way to see the light up close, although it and its crib are closed and "off limits to the public."

Another way to view the Poe Light from the water is on the eastbound lighthouse cruises offered by Shepler's Ferry Service. Narration is provided by members of the Great Lakes Lightkeepers Association, and a portion of the proceeds go to their cause.

The Poe Reef Light can be seen from the air by chartered seaplane; these amphibious machines can be hired to make a tour of the Mackinac Straits and environs.

Because of its relatively remote location, the Poe Reef Light does not have a high iconographic profile. Nevertheless, an embroidered image is available.

== See also ==
- Lighthouses in the United States

== Gallery ==
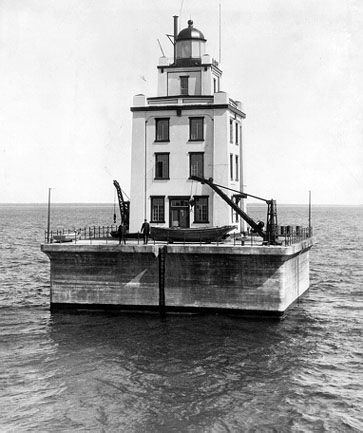
Poe Reef Light in its original, all white, paint

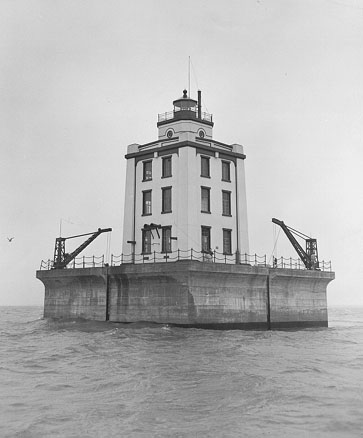
Martin Reef Light, Poe Reef Light's near twin
