= Fourteen Foot Shoal Light =

Lighthouse in Michigan, United States

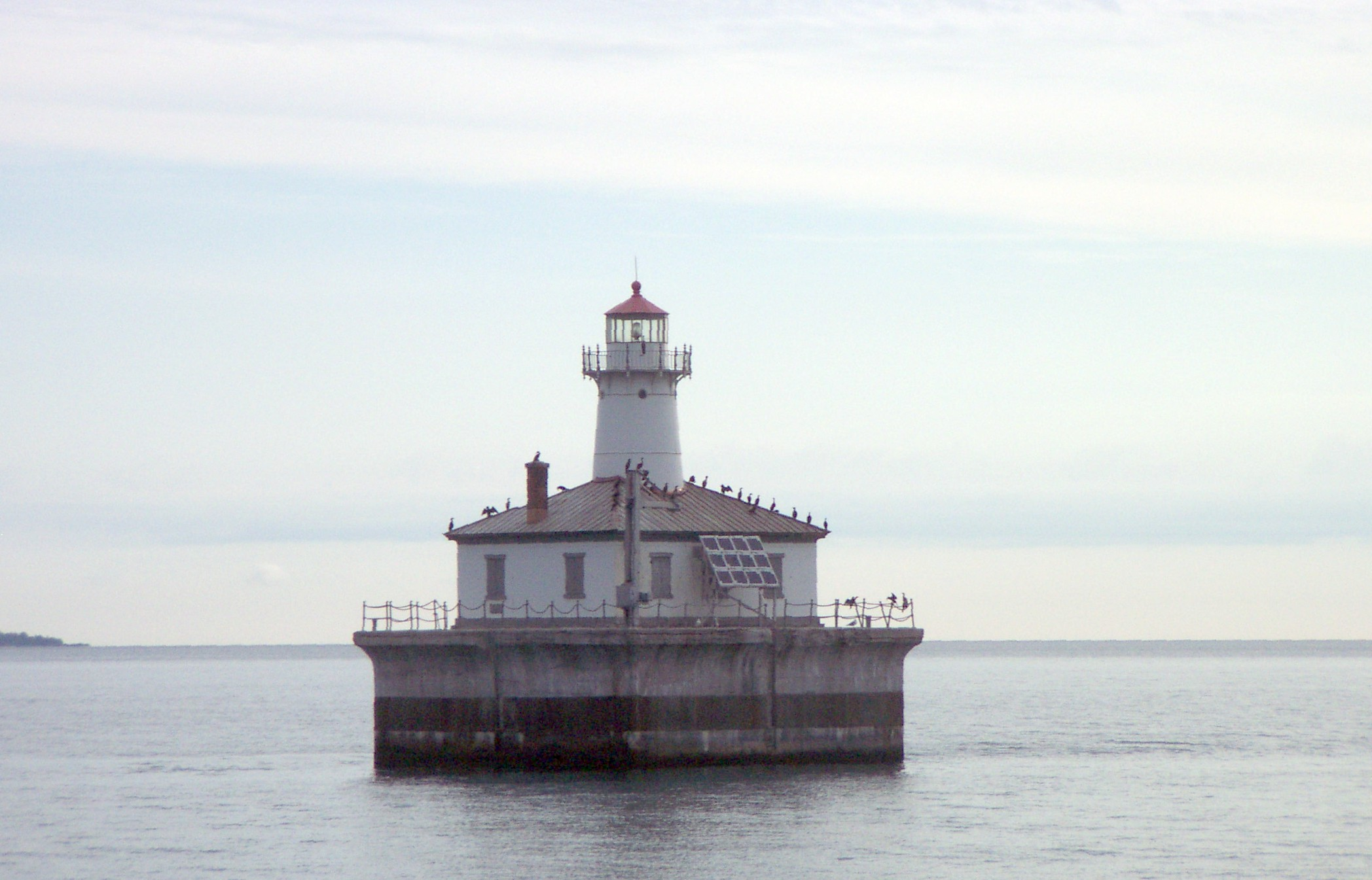
- The light in 2001 (note the solar panels that provide the current power)
- Location: Lake Huron, Michigan
- Coordinates: 45°40′47.3″N 84°26′6″W

Tower
- Constructed: 1929
- Foundation: Concrete Crib
- Construction: Reinforced concrete and steel
- Automated: 1930
- Height: 36 feet (11 m)
- Shape: square building; frustum of a cone tower
- Markings: White with red trim
- Heritage: National Register of Historic Places listed place
- Fog signal: HORN: 1 blast ev 15 s (2s bl) Diaphone

Light
- First lit: 1930
- Focal height: 55 feet (17 m)
- Lens: Fourth-order Fresnel lens (original), 9.8-inch (250 mm) Tidelands acrylic optic Fresnel lens (current)
- Range: 9 nautical miles (17 km; 10 mi)
- Characteristic: Occulting W 4 seconds Operates year round.
- Fourteen Foot Shoal Light Station
- U.S. National Register of Historic Places
- NRHP reference No.: 05000742
- Added to NRHP: July 27, 2005

The lighthouse at Fourteen Foot Shoal was named to note that the lake is only 14 feet (4.3 m) deep at this point, which is a hazard to navigation, ships and mariners.

This light is located at the northern end of Lake Huron, Michigan, US, where it is necessary for boats heading to Chicago to pass through a narrow strait and still avoid shallow water. The most common path is to go south of Bois Blanc Island (Michigan). In this channel, the Poe Reef Light marks the northern end of the safe channel and the Fourteen Foot Shoal light marks the southern side of the channel.

== History ==
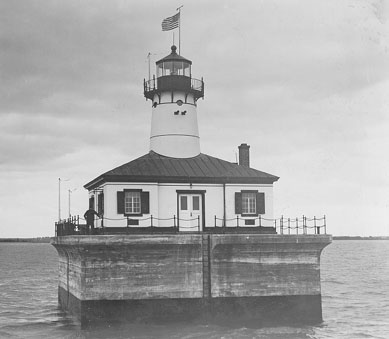
Fourteen Foot Shoal Light ca. 1950

The United States Lighthouse Service intended from the time of design that this light would be automated (possibly the first such instance) and operated by radio control from the nearby Poe Reef Light which is 3.5 miles (5.6 km) away; the keeper's house was never intended to be used as a residence. In 1925 a temporary acetylene buoy was installed there and construction of the permanent light began in 1929 such that the light could begin operation in 1930.

The original light was a fourth-order Fresnel lens. The focal plane is 56 feet (17 m). It now has a 9.8-inch (250 mm) acrylic optic Fresnel lens, and assuming it is properly installed and adjusted, has a maximum visible range of 9 nmi (17 km). A diaphone fog horn is attached.

== Current status and getting there ==
It is in U.S. Coast Guard District 9, and is still an active aid to navigation.

In 2002 the crew of the Cutter USCGC Mackinaw (WAGB-83) painted and refurbished the light.

The light has been added to the National Register of Historic Places; but is not on the state registry, although it was determined to be eligible by the Michigan State Historic Preservation Office.

A private boat is, of course, the best way to see this light close up. Short of that, Nautical North Family Adventures of Cheboygan passes by it on daily shipwreck tours, Sheplers Ferry Service out of Mackinaw City offers periodic lighthouse cruises in the summer season. Its "Eastbound Tour" includes passes by Round Island Light, Bois Blanc Island and Light, Poe Reef Light and Fourteen Foot Shoal. Schedules and rates are available from Shepler's. Boat narration is provided by the Great Lakes Lightkeepers Association.

A distant view can be had from the Cheboygan Crib Light and the Cheboygan State Park.

On May 15, 2012, the National Park Service made the light available for ownership transfer under the National Historic Lighthouse Preservation Act.

On September 30, 2017, the GSA ended its public auction transferring ownership to the Lake Huron Lighthouse Preservation Society Inc., a Michigan nonprofit organization managed by Jerry Persons and Joseph Niewiek.
