= Cordwood Point =

Coordinates: 45.664°N 84.330°W

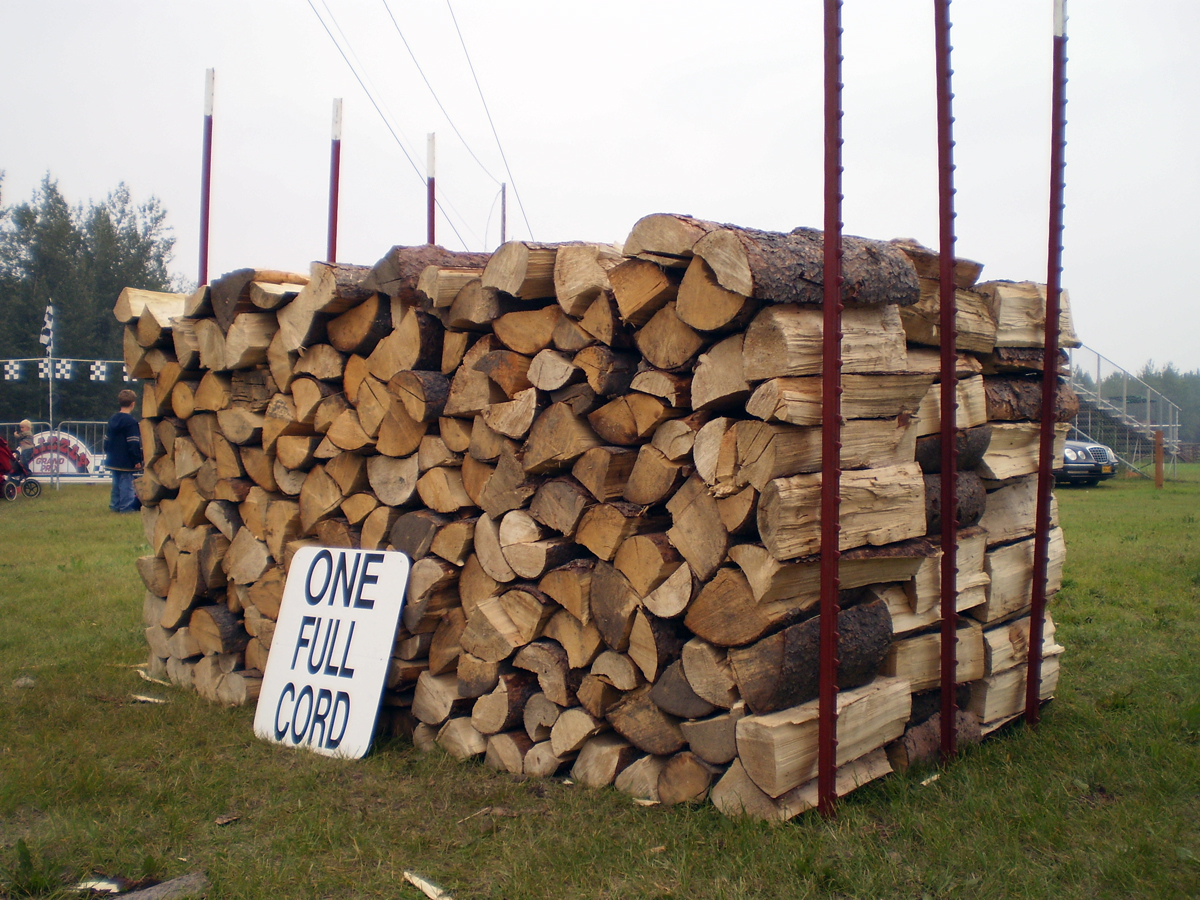
A cord of wood

Cordwood Point is a promontory of Cheboygan County that extends out into Lake Huron. Located 6.5 miles (10.5 km) east of Cheboygan, it marks the east end of the South Channel, the southernmost navigational channel of the Straits of Mackinac. The point has been subdivided into real estate for cabins and summer residences. U.S. Highway 23 serves the point and its small settlement.

The point's name reflects the need of pioneer steamboats to be fueled with cordwood. Small steamboats would stop here at now-long-vanished wharves and fuel up. Later technology moved the primary fuel supply of Lake Huron steamboats from wood to coal, and the cordwood trade dwindled and died. When the county was organized into townships, Cordwood Point became part of Benton Township.

Poe Reef Light, the midchannel lighthouse in the South Channel, stands 2.6 miles (4.2 km) northwest of Cordwood Point.
