= Bois Blanc Pines School District =

School district in Michigan

Address
- 100 Sioux Avenue Point Aux Pins, Mackinac County, Michigan, 49775; United States

District information
- Grades: Kindergarten-8
- President: Jim Gilligan
- Vice-president: Rick Navarre
- Superintendent: Dr. Angie McArthur
- Schools: 1
- Budget: $181,000 2022-2023 expenditures
- NCES District ID: 2606300

Students and staff
- Students: 6 (2024-2025)
- Teachers: 1 (on an FTE basis) (2024-2025)
- Staff: 2.41 FTE (2024-2025)
- Student–teacher ratio: 6:1 (2025-2026)

Other information
- Website: boisblanc.eupschools.org

Bois Blanc Pines School District is a public school district located in Bois Blanc Township in the U.S. state of Michigan. The district had an enrollment of six students for the 2024–25 school year It ranks as the smallest district in the state in terms of enrollment and among the smallest in the nation. The district contains one school, Pines School Elementary, which is a one-room schoolhouse that provides K–8 primary education. It is one of the last functioning one-room schoolhouses in the state of Michigan.

== Location ==
The school district serves the entirety of Bois Blanc Township on Bois Blanc Island in Lake Huron. The district contains one school located at 100 Sioux Avenue (or Lime Kiln Point Road) in the unincorporated community of Pointe Aux Pins on the southern coast of the island at 45°44′03.7″N 84°28′43.0″W. The district is conterminous with Bois Blanc Township, which covers a land area of 35.11 square miles (90.93 km^{2}) and had a population of 100 at the 2020 census.

The district is part of the Eastern Upper Peninsula Intermediate School District. It is one of only four insular school districts in the state of Michigan, along with Beaver Island Community School, Grosse Ile Township Schools, and Mackinac Island School District.

== History ==
The district's only building, Pines School Elementary, was built in 1936.

As an insular municipality, Bois Blanc Township has largely remained a retirement community and resort destination with very few permanent residents. It is consistently ranked as one of the least-populated municipalities in the state, as well as being one of the most remote and inaccessible. It recorded its lowest population of 25 at the 1970 census and more recently 95 at the 2010 census and 100 at the 2020 census.

Prior to 1993, Michigan public schools earned revenue primarily through property taxes. Bois Blanc Township contained around 300 taxable residences that were primarily summer cottages. Almost the entire source of income revenue for the district came from taxing these non-permanent residencies. However, in 1994, state law changed to significantly reduce property tax allocation to public education and instead increased sales tax revenues, which the township earned very little. Additionally, the state implemented a new state-funded compensation rate to be determined by the number of students enrolled in a district. At the time, Bois Blanc Pines School District had an enrollment of only five students and an annual operating cost of $75,000—half of which paid the salary to the district's only teacher.

Because of the school's financial constraints, it immediately began running a deficit, and it was in danger of closing by the end of the decade. State lawmakers saw the need to allocate more funding to Bois Blanc Pines School District despite its low enrollment, but a proposal to extend extra funding to the small district was vetoed by Governor John Engler. Because of the township's remoteness, a merger with a mainland school district was largely implausible—necessitating the township to maintain its own independent school district, despite very low enrollment and sources of revenue.

=== Recent history ===
The Bois Blanc Pines School District remained open, despite financial hardships due to changes in the state's educational revenue policies. The district's only building, Pines School Elementary, serves students from kindergarten through eighth grade. The district does not provide secondary education after the eighth grade. When a student reaches ninth grade, they attend Cheboygan Area Schools on the mainland in Cheboygan. The school district pays the expenses of ferry transportation and housing for the student to continue their education at Cheboygan High School. Very few school-aged children live in the township. In 2000, the township recorded only four residents under the age of 14.

In order to increase its revenue, Bois Blanc Pines School District is an "out-of-formula district" that is allowed to keep its non-homestead tax revenue on properties not permanently occupied. By doing so, the district does not collect grant money from the state but does receive state educational funding in other forms. In 2015–16, the district spent $63,749 per student with an enrollment of only two. For comparison, the average spending-per-student in the state of Michigan was $9,996 per student. Because of its very low population, the district often ranks near the top in spending money per student in their budget. In 2016–17, the district spent $64,229 each for two students, which was the second highest spending-per-student after Wells Township School in Marquette County, which enrolled 10 students at $64,494 per student.

In the 2018–19 and 2019–20 school year, the district allocated $61,502 per student, which again ranked the district highest of the state's 827 school districts.

In 2019–20, the district received $15,916 per student from the state as part of the Foundation Allowance revenue program, which by far ranked Bois Blanc Pines School District as the highest recipient in the state under the program. The district paid its lone teacher $53,267 per year, which is below the state teaching average salary of $62,170. For the 2024–25 school year, the school district had one teacher and six students.
