= Sheboygan =

Sheboygan may refer to:

== Places in Wisconsin ==
- Sheboygan, Wisconsin, city
- Sheboygan (town), Wisconsin, town
- Sheboygan County, Wisconsin, county
- Sheboygan Falls, Wisconsin, city
- Sheboygan Falls (town), Wisconsin, town
- Sheboygan River

== See also ==
- Cheboygan, Michigan
- Cheboygan (disambiguation)
- Sheberghan, Jowzjan Province, Afghanistan
- The Creature That Ate Sheboygan, a science fiction board game
