= Bois Blanc Township, Michigan =

- Civil township
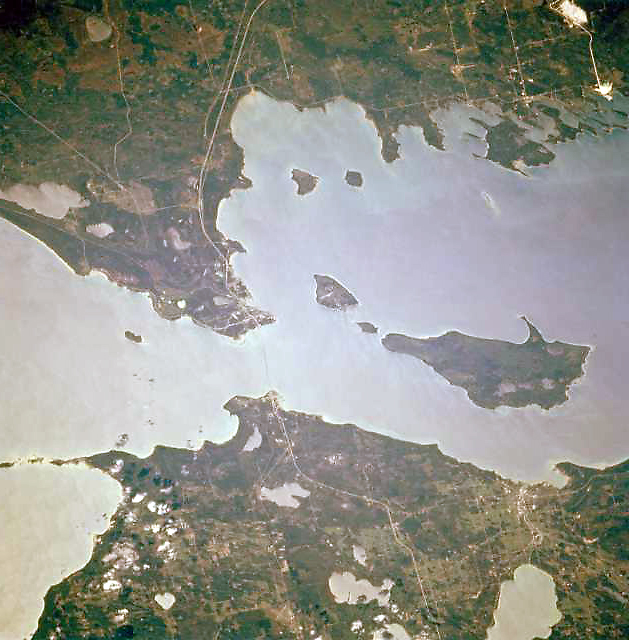
- Satellite view of the Straits of Mackinac (Bois Blanc Township is the largest island)

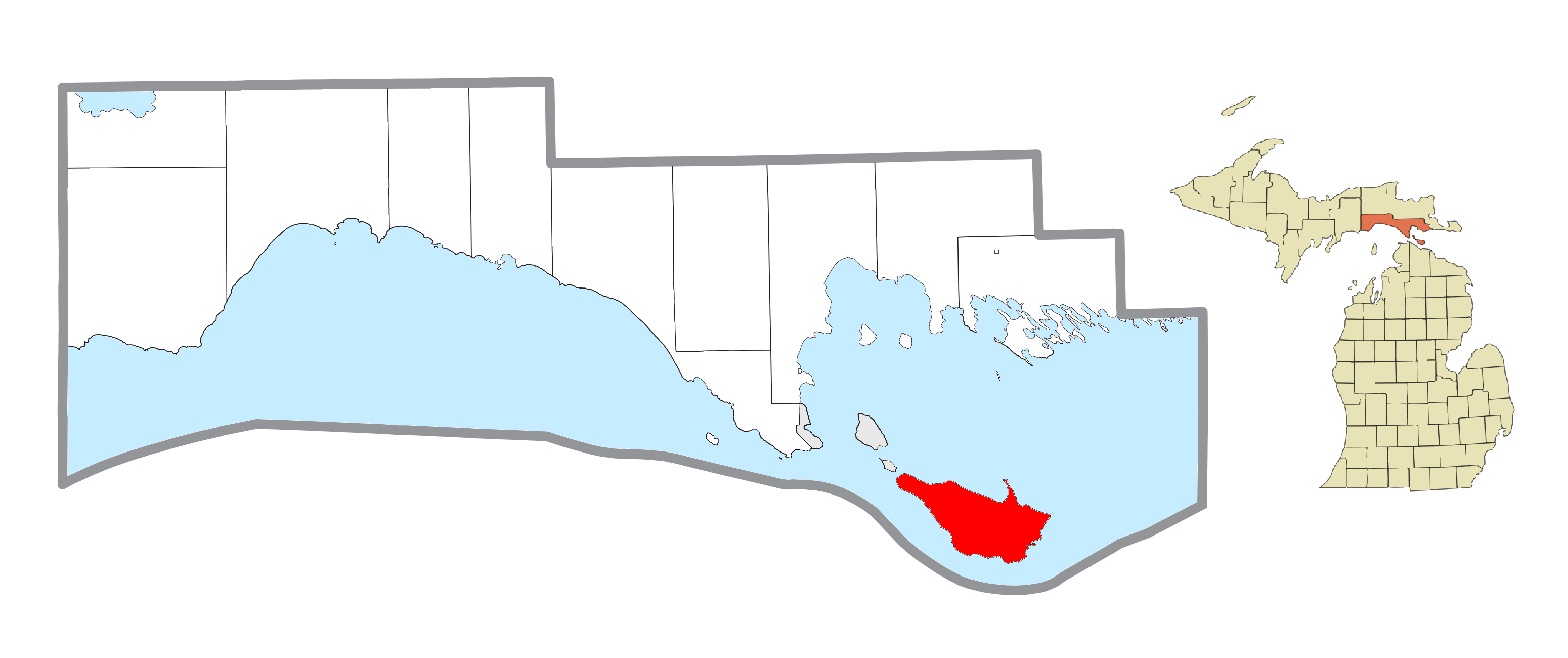
- Location within Mackinac County

- Location within the state of Michigan Bois Blanc Township (the United States)
- Coordinates: 45°45′30″N 84°27′54″W
- Country: United States
- State: Michigan
- County: Mackinac
- Established: 1895

Government
  - Supervisor: Brent Sharpe
  - Clerk: Diane Akright

Area
  - Total: 48.72 sq mi (126.18 km^{2})
  - Land: 35.11 sq mi (90.93 km^{2})
  - Water: 13.61 sq mi (35.25 km^{2})
- Elevation: 607 ft (185 m)

Population (2020)
  - Total: 100
  - Density: 2.85/sq mi (1.10/km^{2})
- Time zone: UTC-5 (Eastern (EST))
  - Summer (DST): UTC-4 (EDT)
- ZIP code(s): 49775 (Pointe Aux Pins)
- Area code: 231
- FIPS code: 26-09500
- GNIS feature ID: 1625960
- Website: Official website

Bois Blanc Township (/bɔɪz ˈblæŋk/ boyz BLANK) is a civil township of Mackinac County in the U.S. state of Michigan. The population was 100 at the 2020 census. The insular township occupies Bois Blanc Island, as well as some smaller outlying islands within Lake Huron. The nearby Round Island is administered by the city of Mackinac Island.

The township is served by Bois Blanc Pines School District, which is the smallest school district in terms of enrollment in the state of Michigan and among the nation. The district had an enrollment of six students for the 2026–27 school year.

== History ==
"Bois Blanc" is French for "white wood". The name is commonly thought to be a reference to either: (a) the paper birch, or more likely (b) the basswood, called "bois blanc" in other contexts. The basswood's white underbark was extensively used by Native Americans and French-speaking fur traders for cordage, including the sewing up of canoes and the manufacture of webbing for snowshoes. Bois Blanc is in the traditional lands of the Mackinac Bands of Chippewa and Ottawa Indians.

Bois Blanc was ceded by the local Anishinaabe (Chippewa) to the U.S. federal government with the Treaty of Greenville in 1795 by Chippewa Chief Menehwehna. After extensive use as a source of kilned lime and firewood for Mackinac Island and other local frontier settlements, Bois Blanc was settled in the late 1800s as a summer resort community. The Bois Blanc Light lighthouse (1867) survives on the northern shore of the island; it is no longer in service as a lighthouse and is not open to the public.

== Geography ==
According to the U.S. Census Bureau, the township has a total area of 48.72 square miles (126.18 km^{2}), of which 35.11 square miles (90.93 km^{2}) is land and 13.61 square miles (35.25 km^{2}) (27.94%) is water.

The township is located on the eastern end of the Straits of Mackinac directly north of the city of Cheboygan. It is politically and geographically part of the state's Upper Peninsula. While the rest of the Upper Peninsula uses the area code 906, Bois Blanc Township is the only municipality in the Upper Peninsula that uses the area code 231. Bois Blanc Township is one of only seven municipalities in the state of Michigan to consist entirely of islands, including Grosse Ile Township, Drummond Township, St. James Township, Mackinac Island, Peaine Township, and Sugar Island Township.

The township should not be confused with another Bois Blanc Island, which is a Canadian island in the Detroit River much further to the south. That island is also nicknamed "Boblo."

=== Communities ===
- Bois Blanc Island is a historic settlement on the island. Its native name of Mikobiminiss means "white wood" from the simple French translation, and the township would later share the same name. A post office name Bois Blanc began operating on the island on December 12, 1884. It was closed from June 19, 1886 until June 15, 1888; it was respelled as Boisblanc on October 19, 1895.
- Pointe Aux Pins is an unincorporated community on the southern coast of Bois Blanc Island at 45°43′57″N 84°28′40″W. The plat of this resort community was recorded in 1888 by the Bois Blanc Island Land Company of Jackson. The Pointe Aux Pins post office was established on May 15, 1889. It was briefly closed from October 25, 1889 until being restored on May 29, 1890. The name comes from French translation for its location in the pine forest area. The Pointe Aux Pins post office uses the 49775 ZIP Code that serves an area conterminous with the township. It is the only post office for the township, while the name Bois Blanc Island can also be used for mail delivery.
- Sand Bay is a former lumber settlement developed around a sawmill and general store operated by the E. H. Stafford Manufacturing Company. A post office in Sand Bay began operating on November 12, 1909 but has long been disestablished.

== Demographics ==
Historical population
Census	Pop.	Note	%±
1900	225		—
1910	219		−2.7%
1920	68		−68.9%
1930	76		11.8%
1940	80		5.3%
1950	42		−47.5%
1960	45		7.1%
1970	28		−37.8%
1980	62		121.4%
1990	59		−4.8%
2000	71		20.3%
2010	95		33.8%
2020	100		5.3%
U.S. Decennial Census

As of the census of 2000, there were 71 people, 42 households, and 17 families residing in the township. The population density was 2.0 inhabitants per square mile (0.77/km^{2}). There were 420 housing units at an average density of 11.9 per square mile (4.6/km^{2}). The racial makeup of the township was 100.00% White. However, about 2,000 people visit the island. Only about 71 people stay year-round. By the 2020 census, its population grew to 100.

In 2000, there were 42 households, out of which 7.1% had children under the age of 18 living with them, 35.7% were married couples living together, 2.4% had a female householder with no husband present, and 59.5% were non-families. 47.6% of all households were made up of individuals, and 11.9% had someone living alone who was 65 years of age or older. The average household size was 1.69 and the average family size was 2.41.

In the township the population was spread out, with 7.0% under the age of 18, 2.8% from 18 to 24, 11.3% from 25 to 44, 56.3% from 45 to 64, and 22.5% who were 65 years of age or older. The median age was 57 years. For every 100 females, there were 102.9 males. For every 100 females age 18 and over, there were 106.3 males.

In 2000, the median income for a household in the township was $40,833, and the median income for a family was $46,250. Males had a median income of $23,750 versus $0 for females. The per capita income for the township was $27,131. There were no families and 3.8% of the population living below the poverty line, including no under eighteens and 14.3% of those over 64. The 2021 estimates determined its median household income grew to $69,167.

== Transportation ==
The sparsely populated township contains no paved roads. A maintained county road extends from the island's northeast corner to the far western tip. There are numerous unmaintained roads and trails. Commercial access to the island is provided by ferry connections with Cheboygan through a dock at Pointe aux Pins. The township is also served by a paved airstrip, Bois Blanc Island Airport, in the interior of the island with facilities for private planes.
