= Bois Blanc Light =

Lighthouse in Michigan, United States

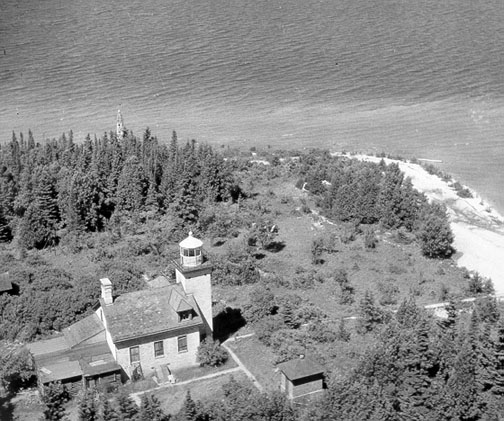
- 1867 Bois Blanc Lighthouse (showing 1924 steel tower)
- Location: Bois Blanc Island, Michigan
- Coordinates: 45.811°N 84.422°W

Tower
- Construction: yellow brick
- Height: 38 feet (12 m)
- Shape: square
- Markings: Natural w/white lantern

Light
- First lit: 1867
- Deactivated: 1924
- Focal height: 53 feet (16 m)
- Lens: Fourth order Fresnel Lens
- Range: 11.7 nautical miles; 21.7 kilometres (13.5 mi)
- Characteristic

Bois Blanc Light can refer to one of five lighthouses erected on Bois Blanc Island, Michigan, in Lake Huron. Two of the lighthouses are currently standing. The lighthouse and surrounding property are privately owned and closed to the public.

== History ==
The original structure, built in 1829, was the second lighthouse constructed on Lake Huron. Kept by the Ward family, the 1829 light was the young-adult home of future industrialist Eber Brock Ward. Due to rising water levels, the lighthouse became unstable, and eventually collapsed on December 9, 1837. The lighthouse was rebuilt in the summer of 1839, further inland from the original structure. Eventually this structure also became dilapidated, and a new lighthouse was constructed in 1867.

This light was decommissioned in 1924 and boarded up, being replaced by an automated acetylene light atop a 35-foot (11 m) tall black steel skeleton tower to the east of the old light. The old station property and buildings were sold to Earl J. Coffey on August 24, 1925, and some time thereafter the steel skeletal tower was replaced by the currently operational cylindrical D9 tower with solar-powered 7.9-inch (200 mm) acrylic optic, which is basically a tube with a light on the top. It is functional, but spartan.

== Legacy ==
The 1867 lighthouse is now owned by the Martin and Reinhart Jahn families, who have gone to great lengths in restoring the historic structure, which was in severely deteriorated condition when they took ownership. The structures on the site are a remarkably complete set, and also include the old life saving station, a brick outhouse, a brick oil shed, and a cement boathouse on the South side of the island.

The light is listed on the state inventory of historic structures.

A private boat is, of course, the best way to see this light close up. Short of that, Shepler's Ferry Service out of Mackinaw City offers periodic lighthouse cruises in the summer season. Its "Eastbound Tour" includes passes by Round Island Light, Bois Blanc Island and Lighthouse, Poe Reef Light and Fourteen Foot Shoal Light. Schedules and rates are available from Shepler's.

It is also possible to do a seaplane tour of the Mackinac Straits to see the lights in the area.

== Specialized Further reading ==
- Brisson, Steven C. (Mackinac State Historic Parks chief curator). Old Mackinac Point Lighthouse: A History & Pictorial Souvenir (1/29/2008).
- "A Tour of the Lights of the Straits." Michigan History 70 (Sep/Oct 1986), pp. 17–29.
