= Twin Lakes (Bois Blanc) =

Lake on Bois Blanc Island, Michigan, United States of America

- Location within Michigan Location within the United States
- Location: Bois Blanc Island Lake Huron
- Coordinates: 45°44′56″N 84°27′10″W
- Type: Lake
- Basin countries: United States
- Surface area: 680 acres (2.8 km^{2})
- Max. depth: 10 to 11 feet (3.0 to 3.4 m)
- Surface elevation: 607 ft (185 m)

Twin Lakes is a 680-acre (2.8 km^{2}) lake on Bois Blanc, an island in Lake Huron in the U.S. state of Michigan. The lake, which consists of two almost-completely-separated sheets of water virtually bisected by a near-isthmus, is one of the largest lakes in Michigan that is situated entirely inside an island in a larger lake. Twin Lakes itself contains several smaller islands within the body of water. Twin Lakes is in the eastern half of the island, located slightly more than one mile (1.6 km) north of Pointe aux Pins, the Bois Blanc island dock and settlement.

Twin Lakes is surrounded by wetland. About 75% of the lake's shoreline is owned by the State of Michigan, largely as siltland or lowland brush. The lake is relatively shallow, with a maximum depth of 10 to 11 feet (3.0 to 3.4 m). For fisheries management purposes, the Michigan Department of Natural Resources deployed gill nets in July 2012 to see which fish were found in the lake. The lake was found to be populated by large quantities of panfish, with the most common species being pumpkinseed sunfish. Brown bullhead and walleye were noted. The lake drains through Sucker Creek into Lake Huron.

== See also ==
- Siskiwit Lake
