= Beaver Island Head Light =

Lighthouse in Michigan, United States

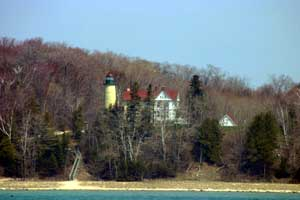
- Beaver Island Head Light (waterside view)
- Location: Beaver Island, Charlevoix County, Michigan
- Coordinates: 45°34′35″N 85°34′21″W

Tower
- Constructed: 1858
- Foundation: reinforced concrete
- Construction: brick
- Height: 46 feet (14 m)
- Shape: cylindrical (attached Victorian lightkeeper house)
- Markings: yellow (natural) w/grey lantern and parapet, red roof
- Heritage: National Register of Historic Places listed place, Michigan State Historic Site

Light
- First lit: 1858
- Deactivated: 1962
- Focal height: 103 feet (31 m)
- Lens: 14 Lewis lamps and reflectors
- Range: 16 nautical miles (30 km; 18 mi)
- Beaver Island Light Station
- U.S. National Register of Historic Places
- Michigan State Historic Site
- Location: East Side Drive; Peaine Township, Michigan
- NRHP reference No.: 78001495

Significant dates
- Added to NRHP: December 29, 1978
- Designated MSHS: April 5, 1974

The Beaver Head Light is located high on a bluff on the southern tip of Beaver Island. Boats trying to navigate North on Lake Michigan need to carefully work their way between Beaver Island and Gray's Reef.

The 46-foot (14 m) cylindrical tower was built in 1858, to replace an 1852 tower. The decagonal lantern room offers panoramic vistas of the Lake. The tower is open to the public from 8:00 a.m. though 9:00 p.m. during the summer.

In 1866, the attached yellow brick lighthouse keeper's dwelling was constructed. A frame addition was added to the keepers quarters to accommodate assistant keepers.

In 1915, the 22-by-40-foot (6.7 m × 12.2 m) fog signal building was constructed. Other outbuildings on the grounds including an oil house, garage and storage building and outhouse.

A radio beacon was placed in 1962, at which time the station was decommissioned and declared surplus. That same year, the original Fourth Order Fresnel lens was removed and placed in the dwelling, where it can still be seen.

In 1975, the Charlevoix Public Schools purchased the site for $1.00. After some vandalism was incurred, in 1978 the District founded an alternative school for youth aged 16–21. The school district has operated an Environmental and Vocational Educational Center in the keepers dwelling. Maintenance and restoration of the structure is part of the curriculum. Beginning in 1978, recurrent summer work/study programs greatly restored the station, which was then opened as a school.

In 2003, a grant was obtained to repair spalling of the exterior brick work on the fog signal building. A state grant awarded two years later provided $23,000 for oil house restoration.

The light station is listed on National Register of Historic Places (reference #78001495). It is also on the State List/Inventory.

== See also ==
- Beaver Island Harbor Light
