= Cheboygan State Park =

State park in Cheboygan County, Michigan, United States

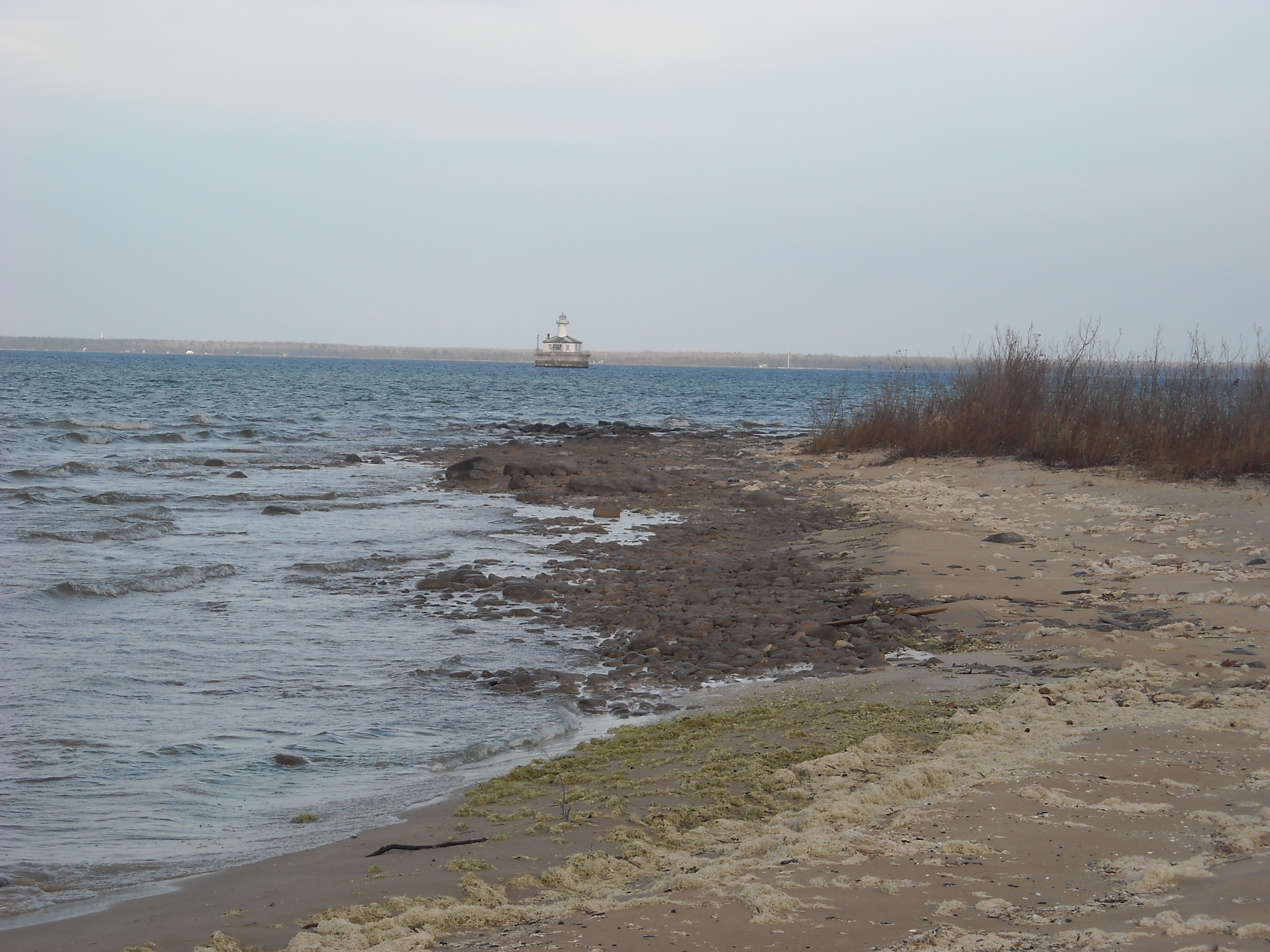
- Park shore and Fourteen Foot Shoal Light

- Location within Michigan Location within the United States
- Interactive map of Cheboygan State Park
- Location: Benton Township, Cheboygan County, Michigan, United States
- Nearest city: Cheboygan, Michigan
- Coordinates: 45°40′08″N 84°25′15″W
- Area: 1,250 acres (510 ha)
- Elevation: 587 feet (179 m)
- Established: 1960
- Administrator: Michigan Department of Natural Resources
- Website: Official website

Cheboygan State Park is a 1,250-acre (510 ha) public recreation area on Lake Huron in Cheboygan County, Michigan, United States. The state park offers nearly 4 miles (6.4 km) of shoreline with opportunities for swimming, fishing, boating, and hiking in addition to views of the Fourteen Foot Shoal Light, the ruins of the 1859 Cheboygan Point Light, and a distant view of the Poe Reef Light, some six miles to the northeast.

== History ==
Today's Cheboygan State Park was officially created in 1960, when "a portion of the Black Lake State Forest was transferred from the Forestry Division to the Parks Division." (Note: The current Cheboygan State Park is the second state park unit bearing this name. In 1921, eight acres known as O’Brien's Grove just outside the Cheboygan city limits, not at the present site of Cheboygan State Park, was accepted by the Michigan State Parks Commission. From 1921 to 1945, a 15-acre Cheboygan State Park, originally referred to as O'Brien's Grove, existed on East Lincoln Avenue in the City of Cheboygan, now the site of the Cheboygan County Fairgrounds. The State of Michigan deeded the former Cheboygan State Park to the County of Cheboygan in 1945 for fair purposes.)

Earlier, in 1930, the U.S. Lighthouse Service had gifted the 59-acre (24 ha) site of the Cheboygan Point Light to the state for use as a public park. (Note: After the shuttered Cheboygan Main Light fell victim to vandals and the elements, it was demolished by the Coast Guard in the 1940s.) Then, in 1956, the Federal Bureau of Recreation as part of a survey of the state's coastline identified Lighthouse Point and the Duncan Bay Beach area as the site of a potential state park. The future park site was given the initial name of "Poe Reef State Park Site." Two years later, the Michigan DNR constructed the 13-acre Duncan Bay State Forest Campground at the location. Four years later in 1962, the DNR elevated the entire 1,250 acres (510 ha) site as a new Cheboygan State Park, with the state forest campground becoming the campground for the new state park.

== Activities and amenities ==
The park offers swimming, fishing on Duncan Bay and Elliot Creek, a carry-in boat launch, picnicking facilities, campsites, cabins and lodge, metal detecting, and hunting. Park trails ranging in length from one-half mile to one and three-quarters miles are used by hikers, mountain bikers, and cross-country skiers. Trails both skirt Lake Huron and plunge into the more remote interior areas.
