= Benton Township, Cheboygan County, Michigan =

Benton Township, Michigan
- Civil township
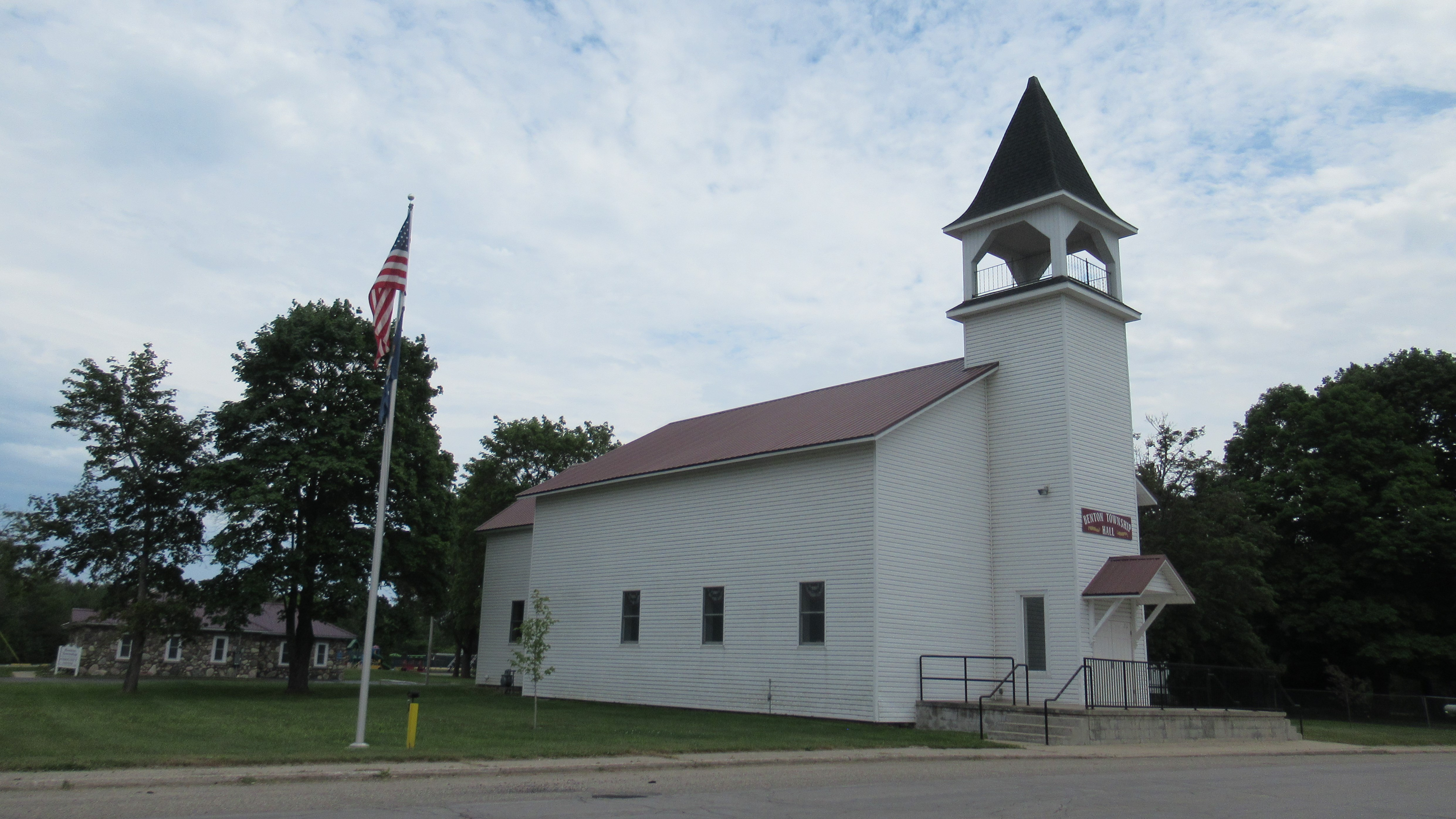
- Benton Township Hall

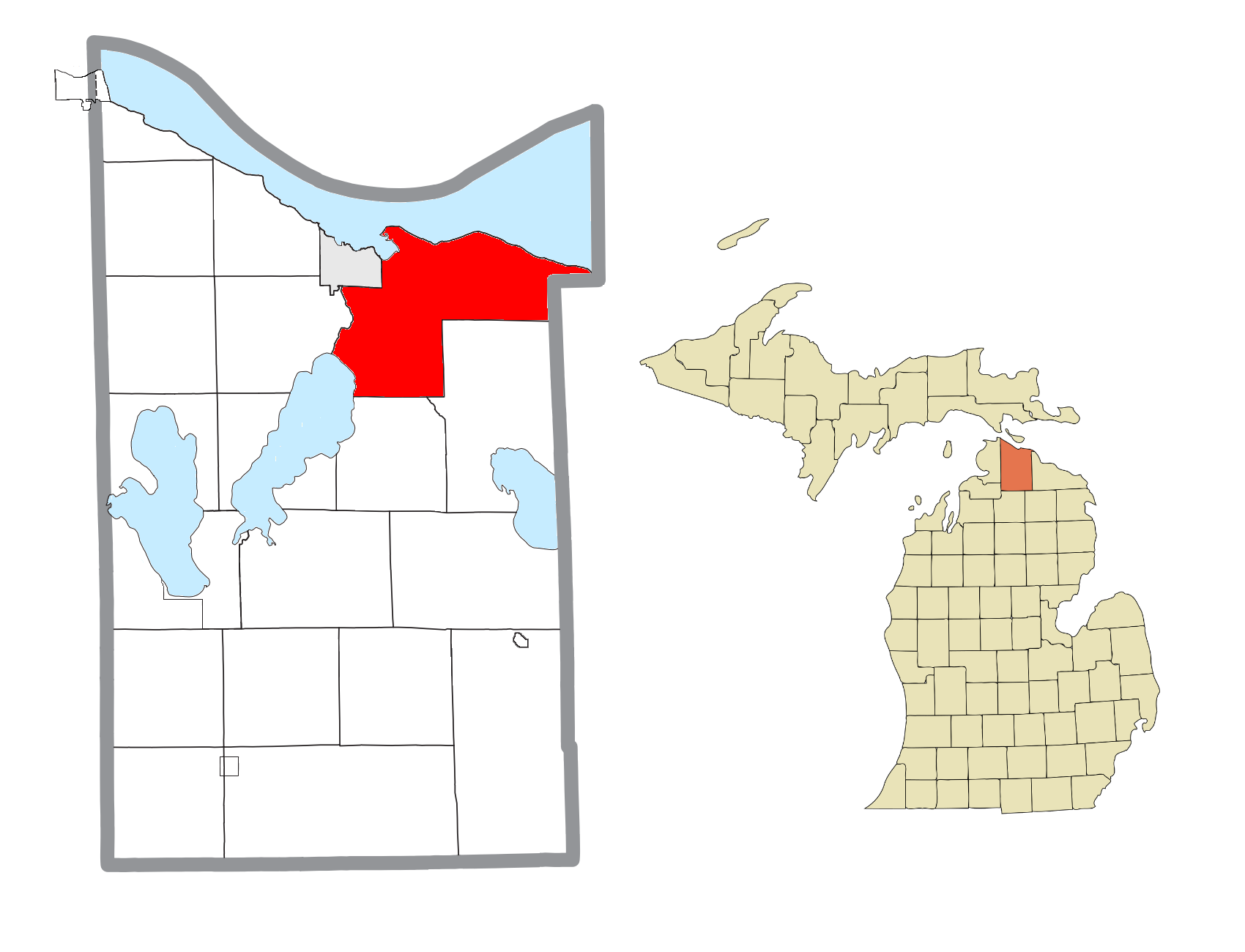
- Location within Cheboygan County

- Location within the state of Michigan Location within the United States
- Coordinates: 45°36′12″N 84°24′47″W
- Country: United States
- State: Michigan
- County: Cheboygan
- Established: 1871

Government
  - Supervisor: Bruce Brandt
  - Clerk: Carol Neumann

Area
  - Total: 62.39 sq mi (161.59 km^{2})
  - Land: 58.66 sq mi (151.93 km^{2})
  - Water: 3.73 sq mi (9.66 km^{2})
- Elevation: 720 ft (220 m)

Population (2020)
  - Total: 3,133
  - Density: 53.4/sq mi (20.6/km^{2})
- Time zone: UTC-5 (Eastern (EST))
  - Summer (DST): UTC-4 (EDT)
- ZIP code(s): 49721 (Cheboygan)
- Area code: 231
- FIPS code: 26-07420
- GNIS feature ID: 1625916
- Website: Official website

Benton Township is a civil township of Cheboygan County in the U.S. state of Michigan. As of the 2020 census, the township population was 3,133.

== History ==
Benton Township was first organized on March 25, 1871. At that time, it was a small area surrounding Duncan Bay, including the village of Cheboygan. In 1887, Benton expanded to a larger portion of the original Duncan Township.

== Geography ==
Benton Township occupies the northeast corner of Cheboygan County, and is bordered to the north by the South Channel of the Straits of Mackinac opening out into Lake Huron. Presque Isle County is to the east, and Mackinac County is to the north. The city of Cheboygan borders the township on the northwest. The southwest corner of the township is in Mullett Lake, the outlet of which, the Cheboygan River, forms the western border of the township up to the city of Cheboygan. The Black River enters the township from the south and flows northwest to the Cheboygan River at the township's western border.

U.S. Highway 23 follows the northern edge of the township at varying distances from Lake Huron, leading west into Cheboygan and southeast to Rogers City. M-33 runs north–south across the southwest portion of the township, near Mullett Lake.

Unincorporated communities in the township include Cordwood Point along the Lake Huron shoreline, Mullett Lake Woods and Orchard Beach along Mullett Lake, and Alverno near the southern border of the township. Cheboygan State Park is in the northwest corner of the township along the South Channel and Duncan Bay.

According to the United States Census Bureau, the township has a total area of 62.4 square miles (161.6 km^{2}), of which 58.6 square miles (151.9 km^{2}) is land and 3.7 square miles (9.7 km^{2}), or 5.97%, is water.

== Demographics ==
As of the census of 2000, there were 3,080 people, 1,248 households, and 894 families residing in the township. The population density was 52.5 inhabitants per square mile (20.3/km^{2}). There were 1,627 housing units at an average density of 27.7 per square mile (10.7/km^{2}). The racial makeup of the township was 94.12% White, 0.03% African American, 3.60% Native American, 0.23% Asian, 0.06% Pacific Islander, 0.06% from other races, and 1.88% from two or more races. Hispanic or Latino of any race were 0.58% of the population.

There were 1,248 households, out of which 29.3% had children under the age of 18 living with them, 62.7% were married couples living together, 6.3% had a female householder with no husband present, and 28.3% were non-families. 24.8% of all households were made up of individuals, and 10.5% had someone living alone who was 65 years of age or older. The average household size was 2.44 and the average family size was 2.89.

In the township the population was spread out, with 23.6% under the age of 18, 5.7% from 18 to 24, 27.1% from 25 to 44, 27.5% from 45 to 64, and 16.0% who were 65 years of age or older. The median age was 42 years. For every 100 females, there were 103.6 males. For every 100 females age 18 and over, there were 102.5 males.

The median income for a household in the township was $37,818, and the median income for a family was $43,900. Males had a median income of $30,662 versus $21,714 for females. The per capita income for the township was $21,130. About 6.0% of families and 8.8% of the population were below the poverty line, including 12.2% of those under age 18 and 7.2% of those age 65 or over.
