= Whiskey Island (Lake Michigan) =

Island in Michigan, United States

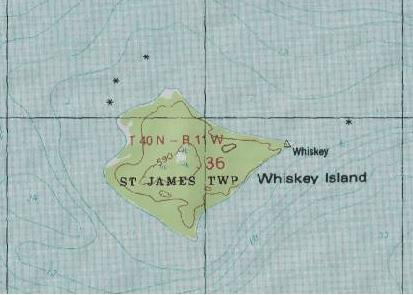
- Topographic map

- Location within Michigan

Geography
- Location: Lake Michigan
- Coordinates: 45°48′40″N 85°36′40″W
- Area: 0.375 sq mi (0.97 km^{2})
- Highest elevation: 594 ft (181.1 m)

Administration
- United States
- State: Michigan
- County: Charlevoix County
- Township: St. James Township

Demographics
- Population: Uninhabited

Whiskey Island (also spelled Whisky Island) is an island in northern Lake Michigan, part of the Beaver Island archipelago. It is about 3/8 sq mi (1 km^{2}) in area. Although unininhabited, it is politically part of St. James Township, Charlevoix County, Michigan

A shoal off the island was the site of the loss of the schooner Chandler J. Wells on 20 November 1884. She was carrying lumber from Manistique, Michigan to Buffalo, New York.
