= Beaver Island Harbor Light =

Lighthouse in Michigan, United States

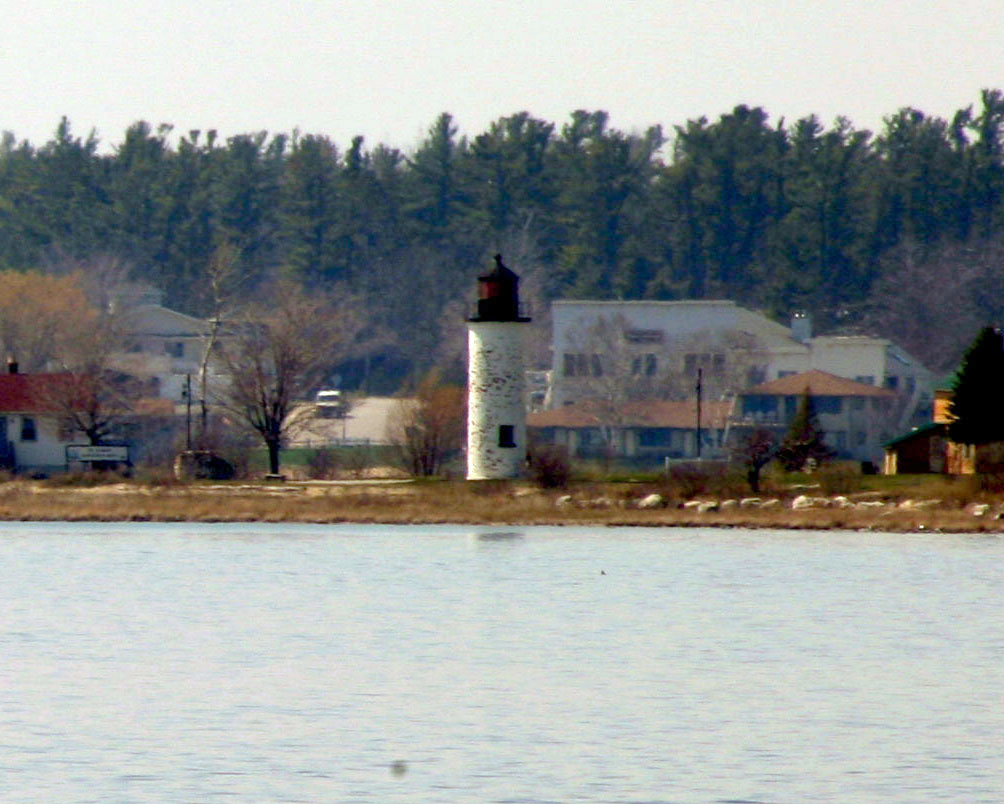
- Whiskey Point (St. James Harbor, Beaver Island)
- Location: Beaver Island; St. James, Michigan; United States
- Coordinates: 45°44′34″N 85°30′31″W

Tower
- Constructed: 1856 (original tower); 1870 (current tower)
- Automated: 1927
- Height: 41 feet (12 m)
- Shape: Cylindrical
- Markings: White (Originally yellow) w/ black lantern

Light
- First lit: 1870
- Focal height: 38 feet (12 m)
- Lens: Fourth Order Fresnel
- Range: 10 nautical miles (19 km; 12 mi)
- Characteristic: ISO Red 6 seconds Light obscured from 127°30′ to 199°30
- Beaver Island Light Station
- U.S. National Register of Historic Places
- Nearest city: St. James, Michigan
- Area: 64.2 acres (26.0 ha)
- NRHP reference No.: 78001495
- Added to NRHP: December 29, 1978

Beaver Island Harbor Light (or St. James Light) is a lighthouse located in St. James, Michigan, on the northern end of Beaver Island on Lake Michigan. It has also been called "St. James Harbor Light" and "Whiskey Point Light". It is associated with a U.S. Coast Guard station, which was formerly a lifesaving station. The tower is constructed of Cream City Brick.

Whiskey Point was originally named for the 1838 fur trading post that operated on the point, and for the commodity that was the post's chief item of sale. Soon afterward in the 1850s, St. James's Harbor on Beaver Island became established as a safe haven in a storm (an event quite common on Lake Michigan). The light was thus a natural extension of the emergency usage. The original light was constructed in 1856, and the light currently in use was constructed in 1870.

At this time, the harbor is used by the Beaver Island ferry, so the light is still an active aid to navigation.

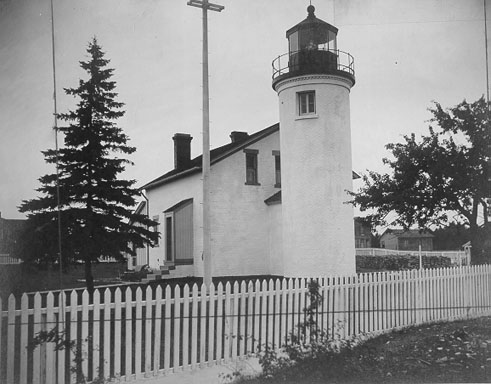
U.S. Coast Guard Archive Photo

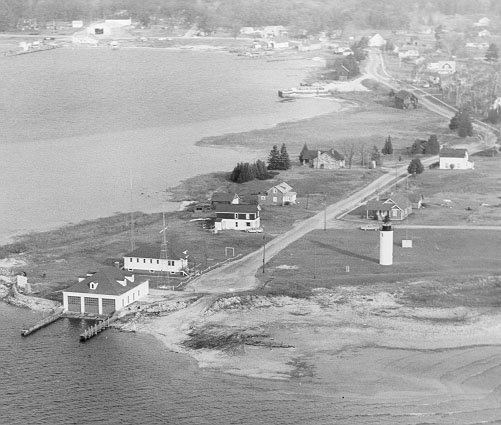
Station without Keeper's Quarters, U.S. Coast Guard Archive Photo

== See also ==
- Beaver Island Head Light
