= Beaver Island Community School =

School district in Michigan

Beaver Island Community Schools

Address
- 37895 Kings Highway Beaver Island, Charlevoix, Michigan, 49782; United States

District information
- Motto: Customized learning in a unique island community.
- Grades: Pre-Kindergarten-12
- Superintendent: Wil Cwikiel
- Schools: 1
- Budget: $2,328,000 2021-2022 expenditures
- NCES District ID: 2604350

Students and staff
- Students: 50 (2024-2025)
- Teachers: 8.66 (on an FTE basis) (2024-2025)
- Staff: 19.18 FTE (2024-2025)
- Student–teacher ratio: 5.77 (2024-2025)

Other information
- Website: www.beaverisland.k12.mi.us

Beaver Island Community School is a public school district in Charlevoix County, Michigan. It serves Peaine Township and St. James Township, which are located on Beaver Island.

The district consists of a single school serving all grades. Wil Cwikiel, the superintendent, also serves as the school's principal. The school has 50 students as of the 2024-2025 school year, down from 96 students during the 1999-2000 school year due to declining birth rates. A unique challenge for the school is that due to its small size, small fluctuations in enrollment have a large impact on funding. The school board has seven members elected to four-year terms.

== History ==
The district was founded in 1898. At one time, there were two one-room schoolhouses in the district, but the schools consolidated in town around the mid-20th Century. Because few teachers would live on such a remote island, Catholic nuns were employed by the school, although instruction was secular. In 1974, the school hired the first full-time teacher who was not a nun. By that time, the school board planned to ultimately replace the nuns with lay teachers.

As of 1985, honor-roll students with perfect attendance were treated to McDonald's hamburgers four times a year, but the meals had to be flown in from Charlevoix.

In 2007, voters approved a nearly $4 million bond issue to build an addition and improve the school building.

=== Historic enrollment ===
- 1956: 4 graduates.
- 1962: 64 students.
- 1974: 55 students, including 7 seniors.
- 1983: 65 students and 5 full-time teachers.
- 1985: 75 in September, 63 in June.
- 1999: 96 students
- 2024-2025: 50 students
