= Grosse Ile Township Schools =

School district in Michigan

Address
- 23276 East River Road Grosse Ile Township, Wayne County, Michigan, 48138; United States

District information
- Grades: Pre-Kindergarten-12
- Superintendent: Audrie Kalisz
- Schools: 4
- Budget: $26,693,000 2022-2023 expenditures
- NCES District ID: 2617220

Students and staff
- Students: 1,493 (2024-2025)
- Teachers: 89.24 (on an FTE basis) (2024-2025)
- Staff: 198.42 FTE (2024-2025)
- Student–teacher ratio: 16.73 (2024-2025)

Other information
- Website: www.gischools.org

Grosse Ile Township Schools is a public school district in Metro Detroit. It serves Grosse Ile Township, located on Grosse Ile, an island in the Detroit River.

== History ==
A school has been located on Grosse Ile since at least 1895, when it was mentioned in the Detroit Free Press. The newspaper endorsed the principal of the school, Miss Frannie Gray, for school commissioner of Wayne County. She was not successful in the election. A new school building opened on April 15, 1901.

Known as Grosse Ile Central School, the district's next school was built in 1911. It was described in the newspaper as "a three-story building of white pressed brick and stone. Besides rooms for the regular subjects, the building is to contain departments for manual training, domestic science, kindergarten and an excellent gymnasium." As of 1915, the school was considered the best in the state by Michigan deputy superintendent of public instruction. It had 165 students total, and 25 students in the school's high school department. The school faced East River Road, and the current middle school was built behind it. It was demolished in 1999.

An evaluation of the school's curriculum and teaching methods was conducted in 1925 by the University of Michigan, and its students were given a series of tests. The study provides a snapshot of the school at that point in time. It found that the intelligence of Grosse Ile students was "normal or slightly above" and that "Grosse Ile has a teaching staff with better preparation and more successful experience than is usually found in a school of its size." The report concluded: "It seems that two factors are largely responsible for the high level of achievement in Grosse Ile, viz., the high quality of the teachers, and the excessive stress on the formal aspects of the teaching of the subjects."

The school used contemporary teaching methods of the period, such as memorization and recitation. The study also noted shortcomings, including the lack of teaching reading for enjoyment and the need for "a more adequate supply of blocks, a better sand table, and a better work table" in the kindergarten.

The current high school was built in the 1950s. Additions and renovations were completed in 2008.

Two bond issues passed in November 2022 to consolidate elementary schools in the Park Lane building and improve other district facilities. Meridian Elementary closed at the end of the 2024-2025 school year and the renovated Grosse Ile Elementary opened in the former Park Lane Elementary building in fall 2025.

== Schools ==
Schools in Grosse Ile Township Schools district
School	Address	Notes
Grosse Ile High School	7800 Grays Drive, Grosse Ile	Grades 9–12
Grosse Ile Middle School	23270 East River Road, Grosse Ile	Grades 6–8
Grosse Ile Elementary	21610 Parke Lane, Grosse Ile	Grades PreK-5
