= Mackinac Island School District =

School district in Michigan

Coordinates: 45.8478°N 84.6241°W

Mackinac Island Public School
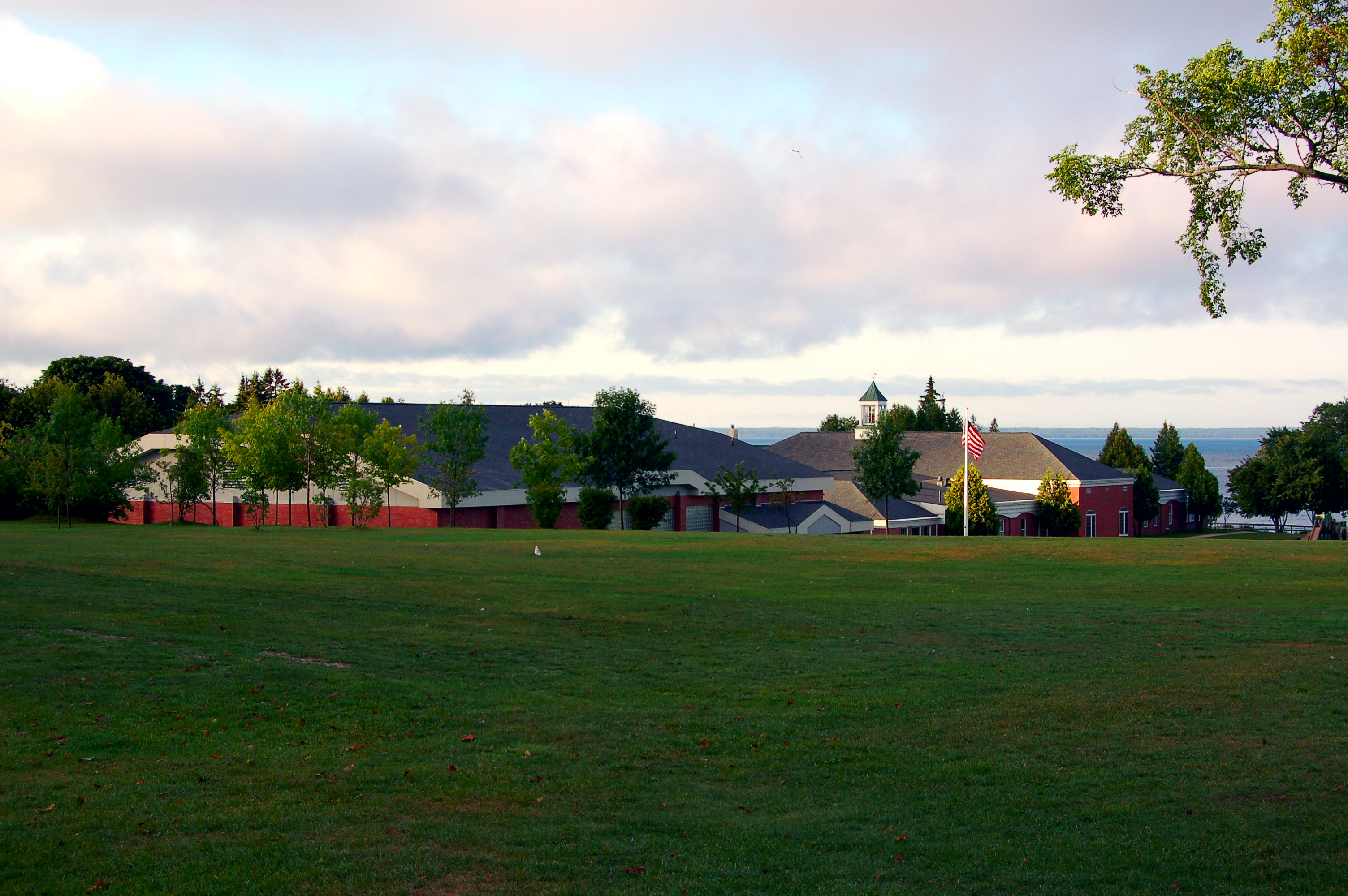
- Mackinac Island Public School

Location
- 7846 Main Street (M-185); Mackinac Island, Michigan 49757

Information
- Established: 1848; 178 years ago
- NCES School ID: 262223005938
- President: Jason St. Onge
- Principal and superintendent: Kelly Lipovsky
- Teaching staff: 9.71 (on an FTE basis)
- Grades: Pre-K – 12
- Enrollment: 63 (2024-25)
- Student to teacher ratio: 5.36
- Colors: Royal Blue; White
- Athletics conference: Northern Lights League
- Team name: "Lakers"
- District area: 4.35 sq mi (11.27 km^{2}) (land); 18.84 sq mi (48.80 km^{2}) (total)
- Website: Mackinac Island School District

Mackinac Island School District is a public school district serving the city of Mackinac Island in the U.S. state of Michigan. The school district operates one school, Mackinac Island Public School (MIPS). Mackinac Island School District includes all of Mackinac Island and the uninhabited Round Island. The district was established in 1848.

== Overview ==
It is governed by a school board of seven elected members. The district operates one school, Mackinac Island Public School, on Lake Shore Drive, which enrolled 63 students in the 2024-25 school year. There are 10 teachers employed at the school, as well as 6 other staff members. The original structure of the present school building was completed in 1969 and consists of seven classrooms, an office, a kitchen and a multipurpose room that was used as a gymnasium and cafeteria. In 1970 a portable classroom (which is still used as a storage building) was purchased and in 1974-75 a group of students constructed an industrial arts building which was attached to the portable classroom. The Mackinac Island Public School has recently undergone additional modifications to the building. In 1992 a library and a science room were added to the main building. In 2000 a full size gym equipped with locker rooms and a balcony, which is used as a weight room, were added to the northeast end of the school. The office was relocated, a computer lab and a classroom were added and many of the original classrooms were remodeled. These recent additions have more than doubled the size of the school. In 2020 a new gym floor was installed and the roof was replaced. The school's basketball, soccer, volleyball, track, cross country, and golf athletic teams, the Lakers, play in Michigan's Northern Lights League with other rural, island-based and small-enrollment schools in far northern Michigan.

Mackinac Island's Lakers have a traditional rivalry with the teams fielded by Lake Michigan's Beaver Island. The two islands have had an antagonistic relationship since the 1850s. With 20 pupils enrolled in ninth through twelfth grade eligible for varsity athletic competition in the 2022–2023 school year, Mackinac Island Public School is the second smallest public school, and eighth smallest overall, of the Michigan High School Athletic Association's 760 member high schools.

MIPS operated the Thomas W. Ferry School, named after former U.S. Senator Thomas W. Ferry, from 1867 until 1960–1961. The Ferry School met in the historic wood-frame Indian Dormitory. After state lawmakers asked the Island to build a brick school building, MIPS constructed a new structure built to meet standards of health and safety. The Mackinac Island Public School opened for instruction on September 11, 1961.

In the fall and spring students walk or ride bicycles to school because MIPS has no school bus, as traditional motor vehicles are banned on the island. In winter many take snowmobiles. For transportation on the mainland, such as for sports games, the district has a school bus stored in St. Ignace.

== Demographics ==
The demographic breakdown of Mackinac Island's 52 students enrolled in 2021–22 was:

- Female – 51.9%
- Male – 48.1%
- American Indian/Alaska Native – 9.6%
- Asian – 1.9%
- Black – 1.9%
- Hispanic – 5.8%
- White – 76.9%
- Two or more races – 3.8%
