= Bois Blanc Island (Michigan) =

Island in Lake Huron, Mackinac County, Michigan, US

Native name: Wigobiminniss
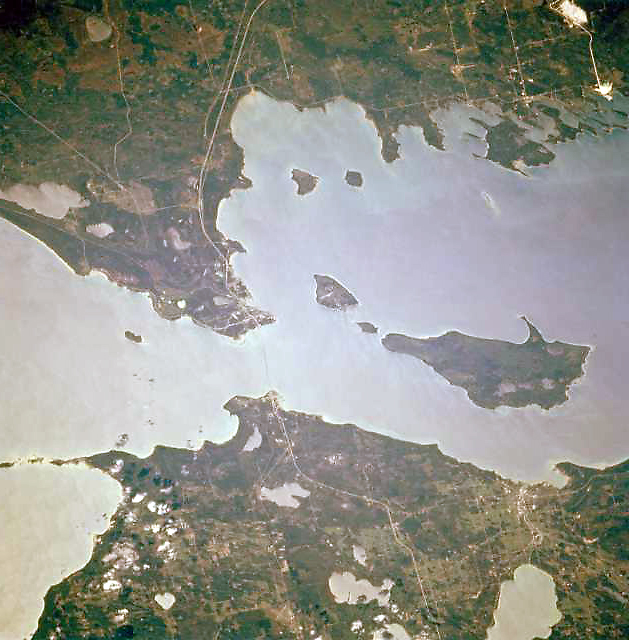
- Bois Blanc Island is the largest island on the right.

- Location within Michigan

Geography
- Location: Lake Huron near the Straits of Mackinac
- Coordinates: 45°46′30″N 84°28′44″W
- Area: 34 sq mi (88 km^{2})
- Highest elevation: 692 ft (210.9 m)

Administration
- United States
- State: Michigan
- County: Mackinac County
- Township: Bois Blanc Township

Demographics
- Population: 100 (2020)

Bois Blanc Island (/bɔɪz ˈblæŋk/ boyz BLANK) is an island in Lake Huron within Bois Blanc Township, Mackinac County, Michigan. The island covers about 34 sq mi (88 km^{2}) and is about 12 miles (19 km) long, 6 miles (9.6 km) wide and has 6 lakes. It lies southeast of Mackinac Island and almost due north of the city of Cheboygan.

"Bois Blanc" is French for "white wood". The name is commonly thought to be a reference to either: (a) the paper birch, or more likely (b) the basswood, called "bois blanc" in other contexts. The basswood's white underbark was extensively used by Native Americans and French-speaking fur traders for cordage, including the sewing up of canoes and the manufacture of webbing for snowshoes. The French Canadian colloquial term for "inner bark" was bois blanc. The Native Americans themselves have a name for Bois Blanc Island and the meaning is the same as the Canadian name. It is called Wigobiminiss. Wigobi or wicopy signifies "tying bark" or "inner bark". Miniss means "island".

"Boblo" is an English corruption of the French pronunciation of the name. Several islands with the same name dot the Great Lakes, and nearly all are known as "Boblo" or "Bob-lo" by the local populations.

== History ==
Juntunen points

Bone harpoons

Bone awls

The island’s Juntunen site excavations have yielded features, human burials, prehistoric artifacts, animal bone, and plant remains.

The excavators recorded 25 stratigraphic layers which represented 6 occupations and 3 phases with 2 intermediate phases where the site was apparently unoccupied for extended periods of time:

- Mackinac Phase, c. 800 A.D. – 910 A.D., occupations A and B, stratigraphic layers I–XIV
- Intermediate I Phase, c. 910 A.D. – 1000 A.D., occupation C, stratigraphic layer XV–XV
- Bois Blanc Phase, c. 1000 A.D. – 1200 A.D., occupation D, stratigraphic layers XVI–XIX
- Intermediate II Phase, c. 1200 A.D. – 1250 A.D., stratigraphic layers XX–XXI
- Juntunen Phase, c. 1250 A.D. – 1400 A.D., occupations E and F, stratigraphic layers XXII–XXV

Excluding the intermediate phases, the sequence is generalized as: Mackinac Phase, c. 800 A.D.-1000 A.D.; Bois Blanc Phase 1000 A.D.-1200 A.D.; Juntunen Phase 1200-1400 A.D.

Bois Blanc was ceded by the local Anishinaabe (Chippewa) as "an extra and voluntary gift" to the U.S. federal government with the Treaty of Greenville in 1795. The cession for the area, Article 3, item 13 of the treaty states: "The post of Michilimackinac, and all the land on the island on which that post stands, and the main land adjacent, of which the Indian title has been extinguished by gifts or grants to the French or English governments; and a piece of land on the main to the north of the island, to measure six miles, on Lake Huron, or the strait between lakes Huron and Michigan, and to extend three miles back from the water of the lake or strait; and also, the Island De Bois Blane, being an extra and voluntary gift of the Chippewa nation." The treaty ceded most of Ohio and a slice of Indiana to the government, as well as sixteen strategic sites well within Indian territory, on waterways in the future states of Michigan, Ohio, Indiana and Illinois.

During the War of 1812, U.S. Navy Captain Arthur Sinclair's fleet took shelter at the island while waiting to attack the British at Fort Mackinac. In 1880 the island provided a haven to alleged murderer Henry English who escaped from Pennsylvania authorities before his trial; he was apprehended on Bois Blanc by Pinkerton agents. Later, he was returned to Pennsylvania and acquitted.

In 1827, the United States mapped the island. The United States Life Saving Service established a life-saving station at Walker's Point in 1890. A few years earlier the Pointe Aux Pins Association was formed. After extensive use as a source of kilned lime and firewood for Mackinac Island and other local frontier settlements, Bois Blanc was settled in the late 19th century as a summer resort community. The island contains extensive Lake Huron shoreline and a pair of adjoined fishing lakes in the interior of the island, Twin Lakes. In 1908, on behalf of the association, President Walter B. Webb hired the Mason L. Brown Company, a Detroit surveying firm, to map and record the Pointe Aux Pins subdivision. Pointe Aux Pins was the first resort community on the island. Much of Bois Blanc Island is state-owned forest land containing White and Norway pines that tower 200 feet (61 m) tall. As recently as the 1950s, Bois Blanc provided lumber to Mackinac Island where woodcutting is prohibited.

Bois Blanc Island was without electric service until 1964, when the Presque Isle Electric & Gas Co-Op completed a project to install a continuous 3.7-mile underwater cable from Point Nipigon to Bois Blanc. At that time, there were approximately 200 structures on the island. An electric service upgrade in 1999 replaced the original cable with two submarine cables spanning the Straits of Mackinac.

== Transportation ==
Private and commercial motor vehicles are brought to and from Bois Blanc Island by ferry. There are no paved roads. However, a maintained county road extends from the island's northeast corner to the far western tip. Fire Tower Road bisects the island and is also the route used for public access to Twin Lakes and Lake Thompson, Bois Blanc's largest inland lakes. There are numerous un-maintained roads and trails.

Plaunt Transportation is the sole provider of ferry services for the island. Ferries sail daily when the straits are not frozen over from Cheboygan to Pointe Aux Pins. Kristen D is a ferry which operates between Cheboygan and Bois Blanc Island. The ferry can accommodate 16 vehicles.

The island is served by Bois Blanc Island Airport, a paved landing strip located on the island (Airport Code 6Y1, elev. 664').

During some winters, an ice road is marked by cut evergreen trees, allowing travel over the ice between the island and the mainland. The route generally runs from Pries Landing on the mainland, to Sand Bay on Bois Blanc.
