= Waters, Michigan =

- Unincorporated community
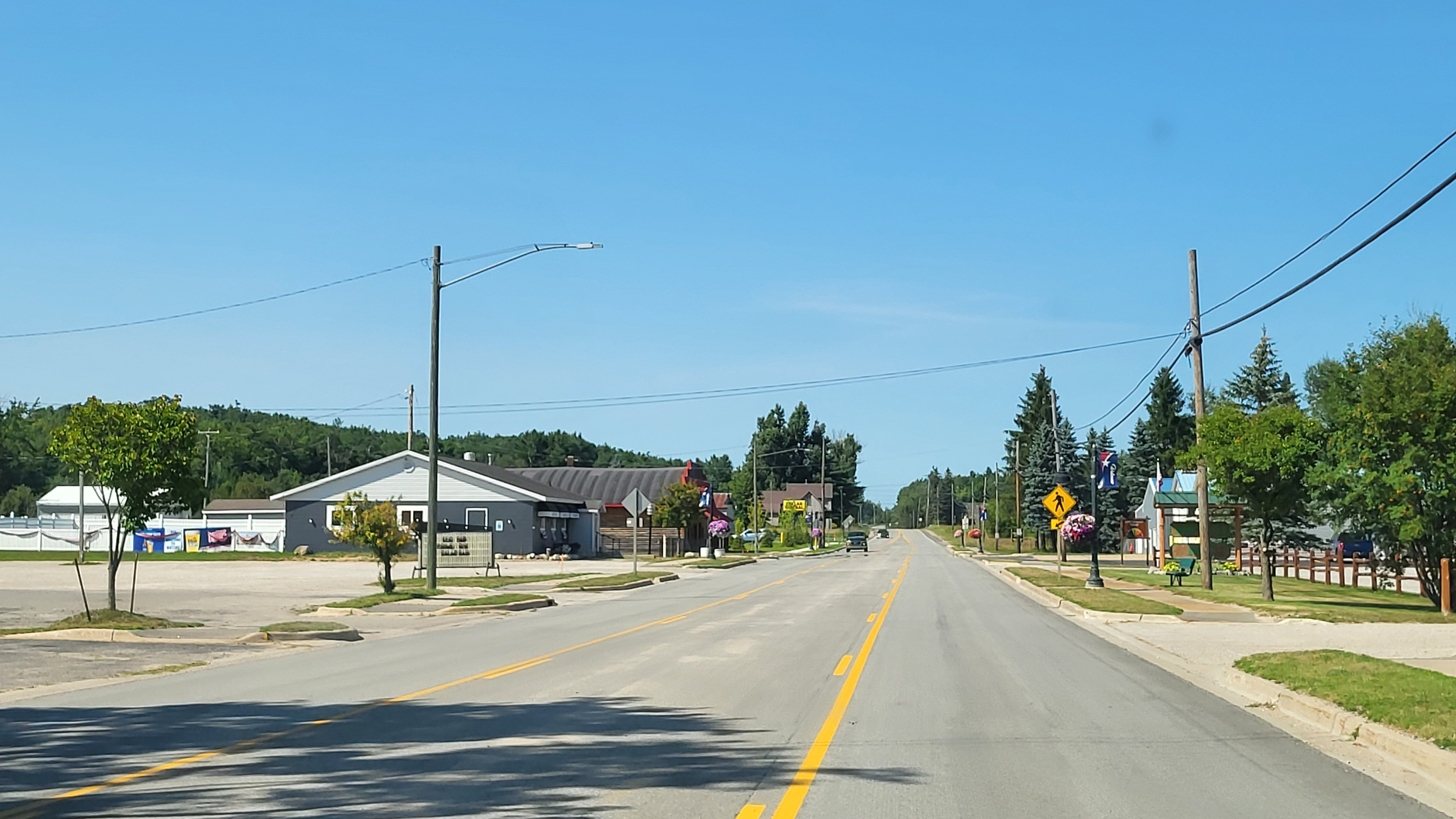
- Looking north along South Old Highway 27

- Location within the state of Michigan Location within the United States
- Coordinates: 44°52′47″N 84°41′55″W
- Country: United States
- State: Michigan
- County: Otsego
- Township: Otsego Lake
- Settled: 1873
- Elevation: 1,263 ft (385 m)
- Time zone: UTC-5 (Eastern (EST))
  - Summer (DST): UTC-4 (EDT)
- ZIP code(s): 49733 (Frederic); 49735 (Gaylord); 49797
- Area code: 989
- GNIS feature ID: 1615853

Waters is an unincorporated community in southern Otsego County in the U.S. state of Michigan. The community is located within Otsego Lake Township.

As an unincorporated community, Waters has no legally defined boundaries or population statistics of its own but does have its own post office with the 49797 ZIP Code, which is primarily used for post office box services.

== Geography ==
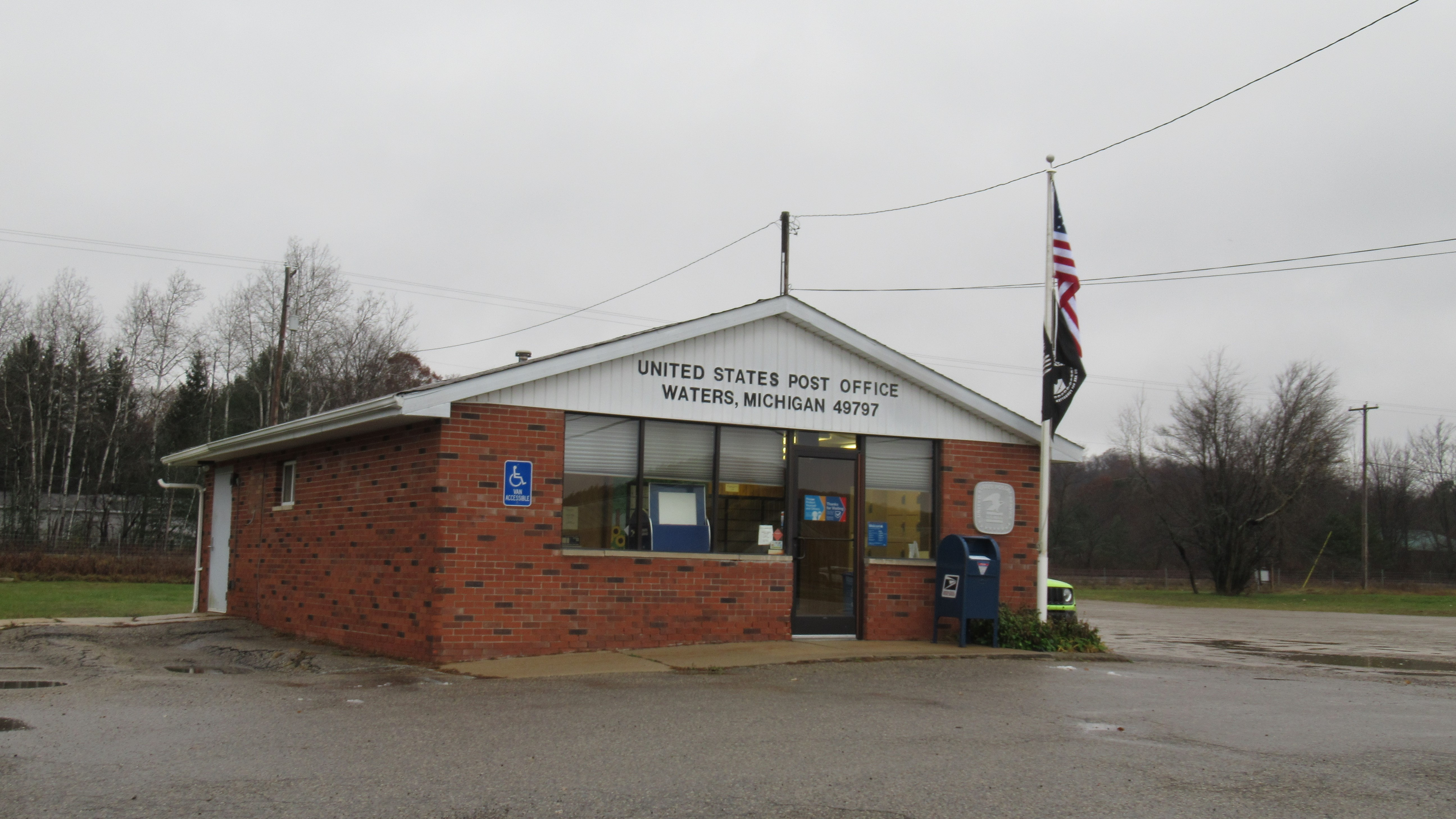
U.S. Post Office in Waters

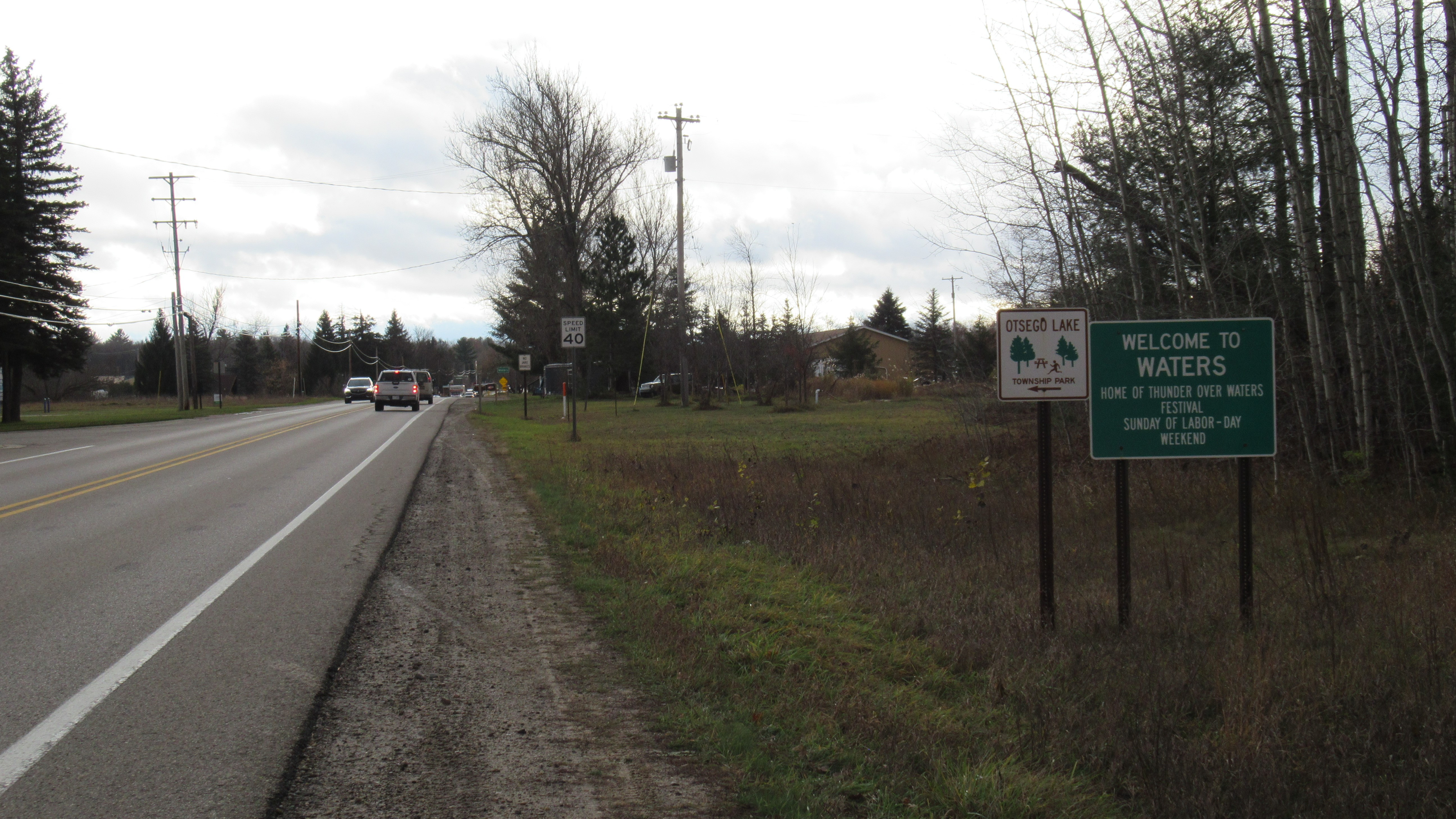
Road signage along S. Old Highway 27

Waters is a rural community in Otsego County in Northern Michigan about 10 miles (16 km) south of the city of Gaylord. The community is located in southwest Otsego Lake Township just north of the county line with Crawford County. Waters sits at an elevation of 1,263 feet (385 m) above the sea level.

Interstate 75 passes along the eastern side of Waters, and the community is directly accessible via exit 270 (Marlette Road). The community is centered along South Old Highway 27, which was formerly designated as part of the northern segment of U.S. Route 27. Other nearby unincorporated communities include Arbutus Beach and Otsego Lake to the north, Farrar Landing to the east, and Forbush Corner and Frederic to the south in Crawford County. Camp Grayling is located just to the southeast.

The community is surrounded by many lakes. The largest lake within the vicinity is Big Bradford Lake, while Little Bradford Lake is just to the north of the larger lake. Lake Marjory and Horseshoe Lake are on the southeast side of the community. Heart Lake and Hatch Lake are located to the north. Otsego Lake is located further north outside of the community. There are numerous other lakes in the area, which is why the community itself may have been named Waters. Portions of the surrounding forest area are part of the Gaylord Unit of the Mackinaw State Forest, while the areas directly south of the county line are part of the Grayling Unit of the Au Sable State Forest. The Michigan Department of Natural Resources manages two public boat launches near the community. Lake Marjory and Heart Lake have boating access sites, and both are only suitable for smaller vessels.

The Otsego Lake Township Fire Department is located in Waters at 10499 South Old Highway 27. The township hall is also located within the community just to the south of the fire station at 10584 South Old Highway 27. Right next door to the township hall, the Waters post office is located at 10568 South Old Highway 27. The post office uses the 49797 ZIP Code, which is the second-highest numeric ZIP Code in the Lower Peninsula after the village of Wolverine to the north, which uses the 49799 ZIP Code. The post office does not have a delivery area and is only used for postal services and post office boxes. The community and surrounding area are instead served by the Gaylord 49735 ZIP Code, while areas to the southeast are served by the Frederic 49733 ZIP Code.

The North Central State Trail passes through Waters along the former rail lines of the Michigan Central Railroad. The trail begins nearby at Bradford Lake Drive in the southernmost portion of Otsego Lake Township and travels north for 75 miles (121 km) to the northern end of the Lower Peninsula in Mackinaw City. Otsego Lake Township Park, also known as Memorial Park, is a 9.0-acre (3.6 ha) park located in northern Waters. The community is served by Gaylord Community Schools to the north in the city of Gaylord.

== History ==
=== Lumber community ===
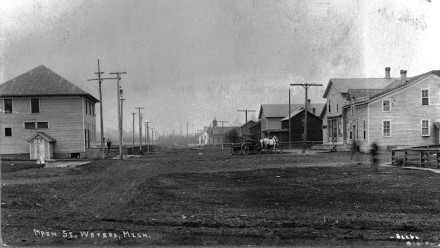
Historic photo of Main Street

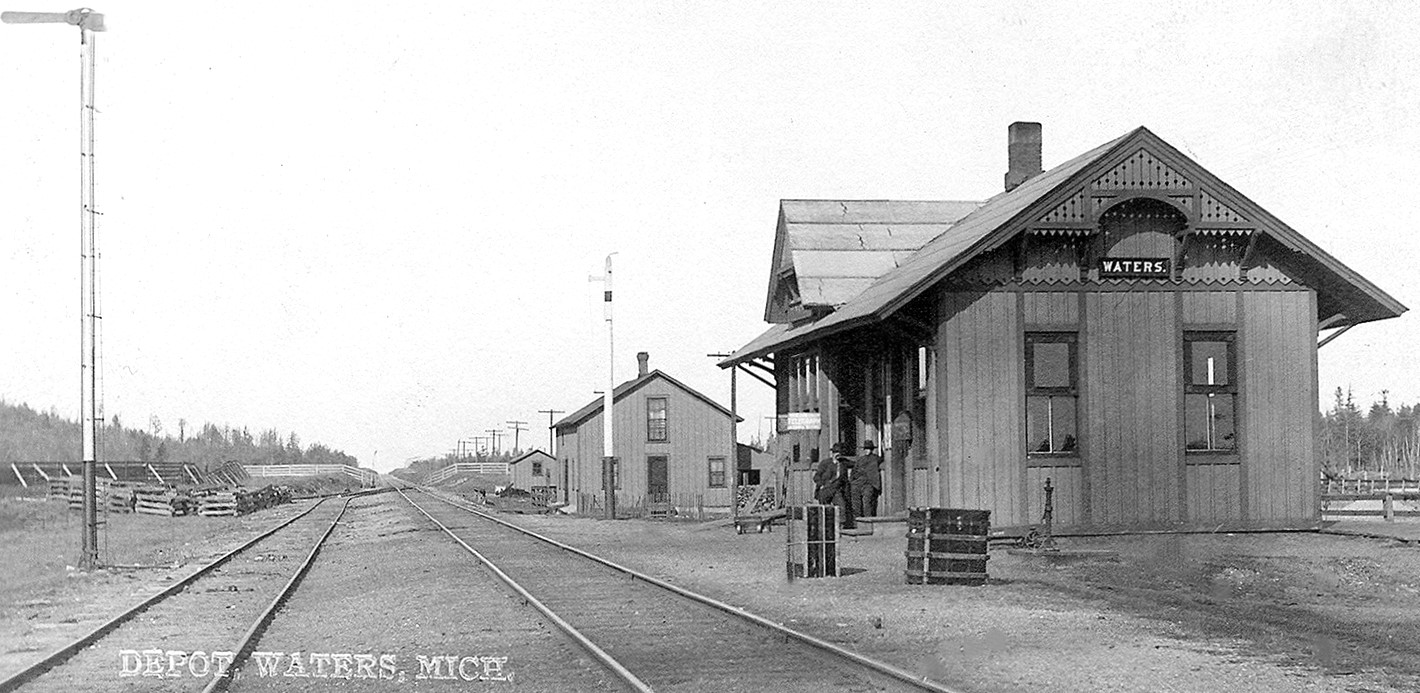
Former train depot in Waters

The community of Waters was settled as early as 1873 and became one of the first communities in Otsego County, which was created in 1840 but not formally organized at the time. The new community was part of Otsego Lake Township, which at the time occupied the southern eight survey townships. When the county was formally organized in 1875, the larger township was eventually divided into four other townships. The community received a post office under the name Bradford Lake on July 18, 1876. The name was chosen due to its location along the northern shores of Bradford Lake, and it developed as a sawmill settlement under the ownership of numerous lumber companies. The railroad station was originally called Wright's (or Wright's Lake) along the Jackson, Lansing, and Saginaw Railroad branch of the Michigan Central Railroad. It was named after the Wright-Wells Lumber Company that began operating in the area. By 1877, the community had about 75 permanent residents, and the company operated several mills, a general store, and hotel.

The post office was renamed Waters on December 21, 1885 and was aptly named after the abundance of lakes in the area. However, the name may also be derived from O. Waters, who was a railway agent for the Michigan Central Railroad. After 1890, the community began to decline as many residents moved further north. In 1891, Henry Stephens moved north from St. Helen and established his lumber company, which returned the community to profitability.

By 1899, Waters consisted of about 100 homes, the Michigan Central Railroad train depot, post office, church, school, general store, and numerous buildings serving the lumber companies. By 1905, the community had a population of around 300, but the lumber resources were quickly running low. The lumber yards near Bradford Lake and Little Bradford Lake were used as storage facilities, and two major fires destroyed the lumber yards. In 1911, the first fire destroyed over 27 million feet (8.2 million meters) of lumber valued at $425,000 ($13.8 million in 2024 dollars). The yards were restocked but burned again in 1914. Due to the depletion of the lumber resources by that time, the facilities were not rebuilt, and the lumber industry began leaving Waters within the next few years. After the lumber industry declined, the community transitioned into farming and tourism. Popular activities in the area included baseball, tennis courts, hunting, and fishing. However, without the lumber industry, many residents left Waters, and the community dwindled. The nearby communities of Deward and Haakwood suffered a similar fate, although those communities never recovered. In 1917, the community had a population of around 50 but soon after was nearly deserted. At one time, Waters also contained its own school.

=== Tom Stephens and the bottle fence ===
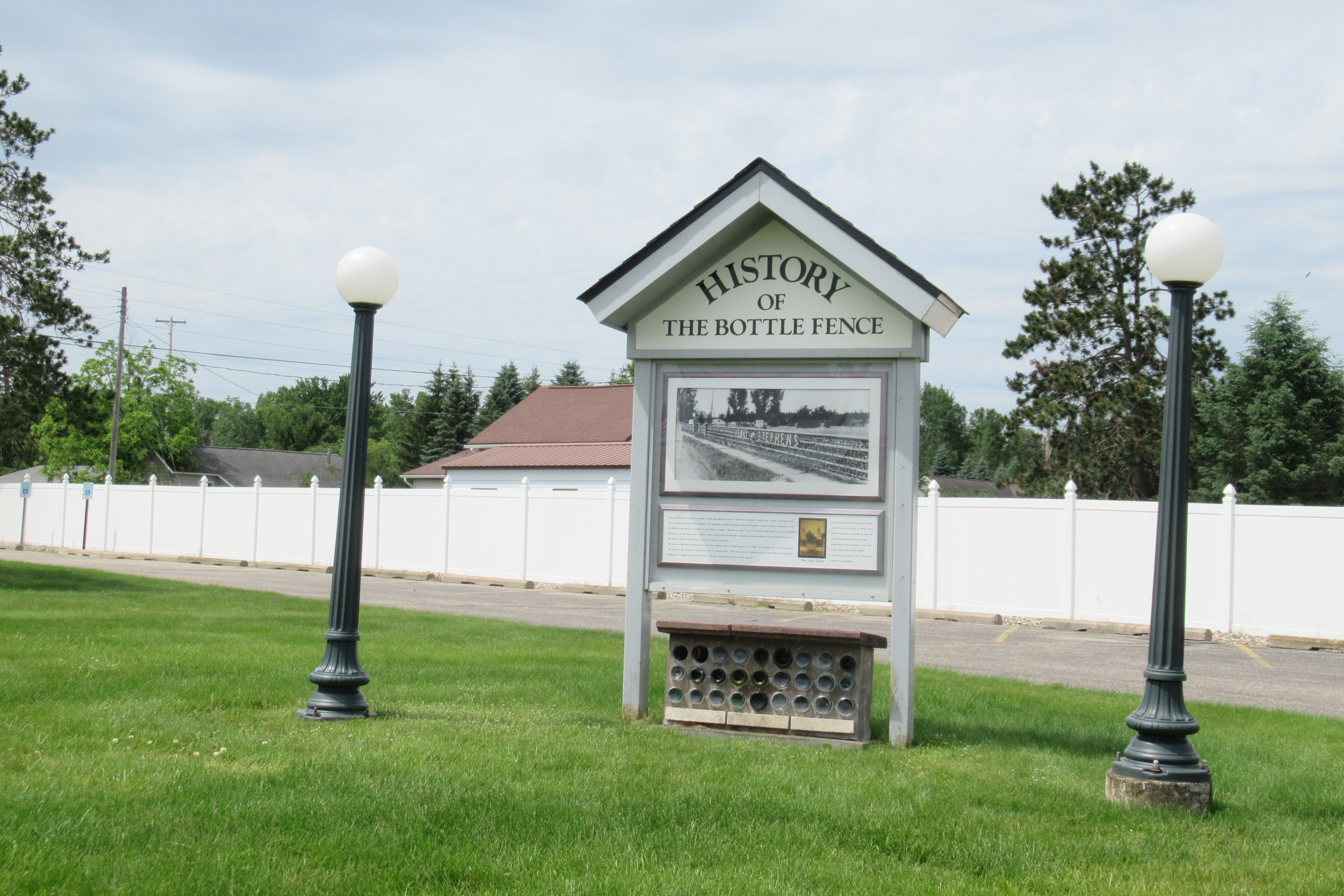
A historic memorial for the bottle fence

Henry Stephens moved to Waters in 1891 and built a very profitable lumber company that helped redevelop the community. His grandson, Henry "Tom" Stephens III eventually inherited the large family fortune and moved to Waters in 1912. He constructed the largest barn in Michigan at the time, which also served as his estate and venue for lavish events.

Between 1914 and 1916, Stephens constructed a bottle fence that eventually grew to be about 200 feet (61 m) long and four feet (1.2 meters) tall. The fence was constructed with glass bottles, many of which were alcohol bottles. In an effort to collect as many bottles as possible, he offered cash to children who brought him bottles for the fence. This allegedly led to children rummaging through the landfill, stealing bottles from local businesses, and dumping out their parents' alcohol supplies just to have empty bottles to sell to Stephens. He also contributed many of his own alcohol bottles for the construction of his fence. The reason for the fence is dubious and may have been built by Stephens as a memorial for the hard-drinking lumberjacks or as a memorial for his father. When Stephens also crafted his own name in large letters on the wall, it may have been due to his own egotism.

Stephens sold his fledgling lumber company in 1916 to the Helper Brothers of Bay City, who began dismantling the lumber facilities in the community and reselling the assets, which marked the end of the lumber era in Waters. Stephens left Waters in 1917. He died near Detroit in 1932 at the age of 48 after having spent most of his family's wealth.

The bottle fence became a local landmark, but it deteriorated over time. It was rumored that Stephens hid money in some of the bottles in the fence, and the fence became vandalized and broken, as well as being used as target practice by careless hunters. Because it was too close to the newly constructed Interstate 75, it was moved from its original location but later demolished. Stephens' barn remained standing and became the Heart Lake Club, which was later converted into the Waters Inn. The structure burned down in 1972. In 1974, the community built a replica of the bottle fence, but it was also eventually torn down and buried by 1996. The unusual fence and its history was feature on Ripley's Believe It or Not!. The property of the former barn and replica bottle fence is now occupied by the Otsego Lake Township Fire Department. The only remaining relic of the bottle fence is a small exhibit and plaque erected in 2000 near the township hall.

=== Otsego Base Ball Club ===
Aside from the lumber industry, Tom Stephens also delved into professional sports by founding the Otsego Base Ball Club, which became a famous traveling independent baseball team. He built a luxurious baseball field in Waters and another one just to the north in Gaylord, and the two fields were regarded as the finest in Northern Michigan. Using his wealth, Stephens recruited many professional players, and the Otsegos became one of the most dominant teams in the state. Stephens himself also served as manager for the team. In 1914, the Otsegos even recruited professional Detroit Tigers player Ty Cobb. Although Cobb only played in one game for the Otsegos, Stephens allegedly paid Cobb $1,000 for his performance. For comparison, Cobb only earned $2,250 for an entire season contract with the Tigers. Other professional recruits included Frank Bowerman, Urban Shocker, Red Oldham, and George Mullin. The team became a big draw as they traveled around the state, ultimately defeating a team in Ypsilanti for the championship in 1914.

Stephens was proud of the successes of the team and even had a team pennant flag flown above his barn. In a charity exhibition game, the Otsego traveled to Navin Field to play against the Tigers after the end of the 1914 Major League Baseball season, in which Cobb had just won another batting title. Many Otsego County residents traveled to Detroit to watch the game, and Stephens heavily hyped the event by bringing in a band to perform. The Tigers won the game 4–0. As evident in photos by the Otsego County Historical Society, Cobb returned on some occasions in later years to play for the Otsegos. Many of the historic records of the Otsego Base Ball Club have been lost in a fire.

=== Recent history ===
Waters is known for the hometown of Ray Muscott, who in 1916 received the first American patent for a snow-vehicle using the now familiar format of rear tracks and front skis. It became very popular at the time and still appears on modern-day snowmobiles.

In 1926, U.S. Route 27 was created and routed to run directly through the community of Waters going north to Mackinaw City. The creation of this highway allowed Waters to recover slightly after several years of decline after the lumber industry ended. In 1927, Remi and Edna Schotte purchased 1,800 acres (7.3 km^{2}) of land in Waters, which at that time had become virtually deserted. Through their efforts, they kept the post office in operation. Members of the family served as postmaster for the next 30 years. They revitalized the town by operating a saloon, hardware store, and salvaging the leftover lumber from Bradford Lake. They later donating land to the township for the Otsego Lake Township Park and fire station.

U.S. Route 27 was eventually truncated and partially replaced with Interstate 75, in which the segment running from Waters to Gaylord opened in July 1962. Interstate 75 was constructed slightly east of the community, while the original segment of U.S. Route 27 was turned over to local control; it is currently named Old Highway 27 and is the main roadway through the community. The Michigan Central Railroad line has since been removed and converted into the North Central State Trail. A parallel rail line operated by Lake State Railway continues to run through Waters, although the community no longer contains a train depot.

In 2008, the community hosted the first Thunder Over Waters Festival, which has since been held annually over Labor Day weekend. In 2025, the event held its 18th annual festival, which is a gathering meant to bring together the community with a parade, food, raffles, and crafts.

During the tornado outbreak of November 17, 2013, an EF0 tornado was confirmed to have formed just southeast of Waters and traveled across Interstate 75 for a short distance. It was the northernmost confirmed tornado during the outbreak, which spawned 77 tornadoes across seven states.
