= Gaylord Community Schools =

School district in Michigan

Address
- 615 South Elm Avenue Gaylord, Otsego, Michigan, 49735; United States

District information
- Grades: Pre-Kindergarten-12
- Superintendent: Mandy Bolen
- Schools: 5
- Budget: $40,523,000 2021-2022 expenditures
- NCES District ID: 2615730

Students and staff
- Students: 2,747 (2024-2025)
- Teachers: 158.82 (on an FTE basis) (2024-2025)
- Staff: 338.69 FTE (2024-2025)
- Student–teacher ratio: 17.3 (2024-2025)

Other information
- Website: www.gaylordschools.com

Gaylord Community Schools is a public school district in Northern Michigan. In Otsego County, it serves Gaylord, Bagley Township, Elmira Township, Hayes Township, and parts of the townships of Chester, Dover, Livingston, and Otsego Lake. It also serves part of Warner Township in Antrim County.

== History ==
Otsego County's first school opened in 1873. By 1877, the population of Gaylord had grown enough for a school district to be established. In 1883, the district built its first dedicated school building. In 1886, the first class graduated Gaylord High School. Another school building, this one containing all twelve grades, opened in 1890.

In 1933, the Civil Works Administration, a New Deal job creation program, began erecting a 2,000-seat gymnasium for Gaylord High School. It was completed in 1936 by its successor program, the Works Progress Administration.

The present Gaylord High School, designed by the architecture firm Fanning Howey, opened in fall 1994, replacing a high school built in 1954. The old high school became Gaylord Intermediate School.

== Schools ==
Schools in Gaylord Community Schools district
School	Address	Notes
Gaylord High School	90 Livingston Blvd., Gaylord	Grades 9–12
Gaylord Middle School	600 E. Fifth Street, Gaylord	Grades 7–8
Gaylord Intermediate School	240 E. Fourth Street, Gaylord	Grades 4–6
North Ohio Elementary	912 North Ohio Avenue, Gaylord	Grades K-3
South Maple Elementary	650 E. Fifth Street, Gaylord	Grades K-3
GCS Preschool	615 S. Elm Avenue, Gaylord	Preschool
