= Heart Lake (Michigan) =

Lake in the state of Michigan, United States

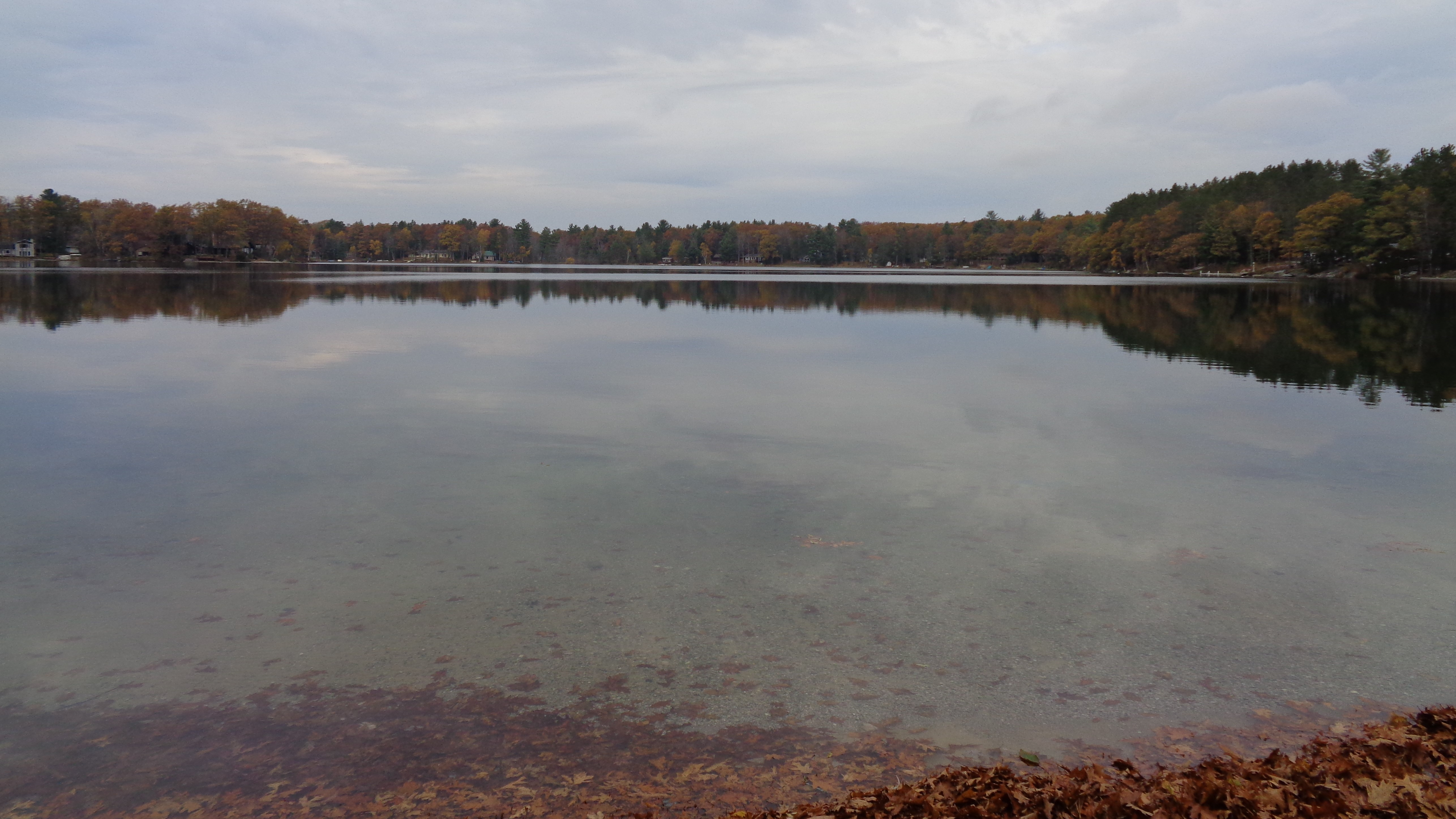
- View from E. Heart Lake Road access point

- Location within the state of Michigan
- Location: Otsego County, Michigan
- Coordinates: 44°53′34″N 84°41′33″W
- Type: Kettle lake
- Basin countries: United States
- Surface area: 63 acres (0.3 km^{2})
- Max. depth: 123 ft (37 m)
- Surface elevation: 1,257 feet (383 m)
- Islands: none
- Settlements: Otsego Lake Township

Heart Lake, Michigan is located in Otsego County in northern Michigan, about nine miles (14 km) south of Gaylord, just west of Interstate 75.

Heart Lake is so named due to its irregular shape of a valentine heart.

Heart Lake comprises about 63 acres (0.3 km^{2}), has a maximum depth of 123 feet (37 m). The lake is a classic example of a kettle lake, many of which dot the landscape in this area. The lake holds healthy populations of splake, rainbow trout, bass, northern pike, and perch, and is popular with area fishermen. While surrounded mostly by private residences, there is one public access point along East Heart Lake Road, which is maintained by the nearby Otsego Lake State Park.

== See also ==
- List of lakes in Michigan
