= KGLR =

KGLR may refer to:

- the ICAO code for Gaylord Regional Airport, in Otsego County, Michigan, United States
- Green Light Radio (KGLR), an unlicensed radio station broadcasting in Boulder, Colorado, United States
- KGLR-LD, a low-power television station (channel 35) licensed to serve Sparks, Nevada, United States
- KGLR-LP, a defunct low-power television station (channel 30) formerly licensed to Lubbock, Texas, United States
- KJOC (FM), a radio station (93.5 MHz) licensed to Bettendorf, Iowa, United States, which briefly held the KGLR callsign in 1990
