= Livingston, Michigan =

Livingston may refer to the following places in the U.S. state of Michigan:

- Livingston County, Michigan
- Livingston Township, Michigan, in Otsego County
- An unincorporated community in Lake Charter Township, Michigan, Berrien County
