= 1964 United States presidential election in Michigan =

American presidential election

- November 3, 1964

All 21 Michigan votes to the Electoral College
- Turnout: 68.8% ▼

Nominee	Lyndon B. Johnson	Barry Goldwater
Party	Democratic	Republican
Home state	Texas	Arizona
Running mate	Hubert Humphrey	William E. Miller
Electoral vote	21	0
Popular vote	2,136,615	1,060,152
Percentage	66.70%	33.10%
County results
Johnson
50–60%
60–70%
70–80%
Goldwater
50–60%
President before election
Lyndon B. Johnson
Democratic
Elected President
Lyndon B. Johnson
Democratic

The 1964 United States presidential election in Michigan took place on November 3, 1964, as part of the 1964 United States presidential election. Voters chose 21 representatives, or electors, to the Electoral College, who voted for president and vice president.

Michigan was won by incumbent President Lyndon B. Johnson (D–Texas), with 66.70% of the popular vote, against Senator Barry Goldwater (R–Arizona), with 33.10% of the popular vote. As of the 2024 presidential election, this is the last election in which Livingston County, Allegan County, Antrim County, Grand Traverse County, Midland County, Ionia County, St. Joseph County, Barry County, Newaygo County, Hillsdale County, Emmet County, and Otsego County voted for the Democratic candidate.

Kent, Berrien, Clinton, Eaton, Jackson, and Leelanau counties would not vote Democratic again until 2008. This is also the best Democratic performance in a presidential election in Michigan to date. Michigan was Johnson's 8th best state, and best in the Midwest.

== Results ==
1964 United States presidential election in Michigan
Party	Candidate	Votes	%
Democratic	Lyndon B. Johnson (inc.)	2,136,615	66.70%
Republican	Barry Goldwater	1,060,152	33.10%
Socialist Workers	Clifton DeBerry	3,817	0.12%
Socialist Labor	Eric Hass	1,704	0.05%
Prohibition	E. Harold Munn	669	0.02%
Write-in	Scattering	145	0.00%
Total votes		3,203,102	100.00%

=== Results by county ===
County	Lyndon B. Johnson Democratic		Barry Goldwater Republican		All Others Various		Margin		Total votes cast
County	#	%	#	%	#	%	#	%	Total votes cast
Alcona	1,611	57.23%	1,199	42.59%	5	0.18%	412	14.64%	2,815
Alger	2,743	73.05%	1,010	26.90%	2	0.05%	1,733	46.15%	3,755
Allegan	11,934	51.45%	11,223	48.39%	37	0.16%	711	3.06%	23,194
Alpena	7,508	65.45%	3,954	34.47%	10	0.09%	3,554	30.98%	11,472
Antrim	2,684	55.19%	2,172	44.66%	7	0.14%	512	10.53%	4,863
Arenac	2,436	63.24%	1,413	36.68%	3	0.08%	1,023	26.56%	3,852
Baraga	2,568	68.74%	1,160	31.05%	8	0.21%	1,408	37.69%	3,736
Barry	8,102	59.36%	5,509	40.36%	39	0.29%	2,593	19.00%	13,650
Bay	29,754	71.34%	11,896	28.52%	56	0.13%	17,858	42.82%	41,706
Benzie	1,983	54.15%	1,674	45.71%	5	0.14%	309	8.44%	3,662
Berrien	33,653	55.94%	26,387	43.86%	122	0.20%	7,266	12.08%	60,162
Branch	7,858	60.29%	5,110	39.21%	66	0.51%	2,748	21.08%	13,034
Calhoun	32,939	63.31%	18,987	36.50%	99	0.19%	13,952	26.81%	52,025
Cass	8,789	59.62%	5,925	40.19%	28	0.19%	2,864	19.43%	14,742
Charlevoix	3,757	58.45%	2,664	41.44%	7	0.11%	1,093	17.01%	6,428
Cheboygan	4,028	63.12%	2,342	36.70%	11	0.17%	1,686	26.42%	6,381
Chippewa	6,537	61.33%	4,098	38.45%	23	0.22%	2,439	22.88%	10,658
Clare	2,927	56.32%	2,258	43.45%	12	0.23%	669	12.87%	5,197
Clinton	8,932	60.20%	5,891	39.70%	14	0.09%	3,041	20.50%	14,837
Crawford	1,464	67.78%	696	32.22%	0	0.00%	768	35.56%	2,160
Delta	10,046	69.25%	4,434	30.56%	27	0.19%	5,612	38.69%	14,507
Dickinson	7,921	70.12%	3,365	29.79%	11	0.10%	4,556	40.33%	11,297
Eaton	12,590	58.41%	8,919	41.38%	46	0.21%	3,671	17.03%	21,555
Emmet	4,197	60.50%	2,731	39.37%	9	0.13%	1,466	21.13%	6,937
Genesee	100,346	67.40%	48,311	32.45%	221	0.15%	52,035	34.95%	148,878
Gladwin	2,725	58.19%	1,941	41.45%	17	0.36%	784	16.74%	4,683
Gogebic	7,945	70.19%	3,350	29.60%	24	0.21%	4,595	40.59%	11,319
Grand Traverse	7,475	54.59%	6,198	45.26%	20	0.15%	1,277	9.33%	13,693
Gratiot	7,383	57.78%	5,369	42.02%	26	0.20%	2,014	15.76%	12,778
Hillsdale	6,564	50.15%	6,420	49.05%	106	0.81%	144	1.10%	13,090
Houghton	9,761	65.99%	5,024	33.97%	6	0.04%	4,737	32.02%	14,791
Huron	7,349	53.93%	6,263	45.96%	14	0.10%	1,086	7.97%	13,626
Ingham	53,685	61.83%	32,965	37.97%	179	0.21%	20,720	23.86%	86,829
Ionia	10,362	64.31%	5,698	35.36%	53	0.33%	4,664	28.95%	16,113
Iosco	4,336	61.56%	2,704	38.39%	4	0.06%	1,632	23.17%	7,044
Iron	6,011	71.36%	2,399	28.48%	13	0.15%	3,612	42.88%	8,423
Isabella	7,040	60.03%	4,672	39.84%	15	0.13%	2,368	20.19%	11,727
Jackson	28,219	57.30%	20,940	42.52%	88	0.18%	7,279	14.78%	49,247
Kalamazoo	40,789	59.89%	27,100	39.79%	215	0.32%	13,689	20.10%	68,104
Kalkaska	1,220	58.54%	861	41.31%	3	0.14%	359	17.23%	2,084
Kent	86,860	56.42%	66,830	43.41%	269	0.17%	20,030	13.01%	153,959
Keweenaw	860	69.64%	374	30.28%	1	0.08%	486	39.36%	1,235
Lake	1,978	71.41%	791	28.56%	1	0.04%	1,187	42.85%	2,770
Lapeer	8,595	58.77%	6,012	41.11%	17	0.12%	2,583	17.66%	14,624
Leelanau	2,369	53.22%	2,074	46.60%	8	0.18%	295	6.62%	4,451
Lenawee	16,815	59.50%	11,385	40.29%	60	0.21%	5,430	19.21%	28,260
Livingston	9,698	58.99%	6,723	40.89%	20	0.12%	2,975	18.10%	16,441
Luce	1,459	62.59%	871	37.37%	1	0.04%	588	25.22%	2,331
Mackinac	2,748	58.26%	1,967	41.70%	2	0.04%	781	16.56%	4,717
Macomb	131,450	74.47%	44,684	25.31%	387	0.22%	86,766	49.16%	176,521
Manistee	5,520	65.37%	2,918	34.56%	6	0.07%	2,602	30.81%	8,444
Marquette	14,045	67.86%	6,615	31.96%	36	0.17%	7,430	35.90%	20,696
Mason	5,993	60.87%	3,842	39.02%	11	0.11%	2,151	21.85%	9,846
Mecosta	4,214	54.89%	3,454	44.99%	9	0.12%	760	9.90%	7,677
Menominee	7,119	66.64%	3,545	33.19%	18	0.17%	3,574	33.45%	10,682
Midland	12,587	58.13%	9,020	41.65%	48	0.22%	3,567	16.48%	21,655
Missaukee	1,288	41.89%	1,786	58.08%	1	0.03%	-498	-16.19%	3,075
Monroe	26,528	69.61%	11,499	30.17%	84	0.22%	15,029	39.44%	38,111
Montcalm	8,970	63.27%	5,181	36.55%	26	0.18%	3,789	26.72%	14,177
Montmorency	1,369	61.23%	863	38.60%	4	0.18%	506	22.63%	2,236
Muskegon	36,769	62.28%	22,146	37.51%	119	0.20%	14,623	24.77%	59,034
Newaygo	5,457	52.48%	4,931	47.42%	11	0.11%	526	5.06%	10,399
Oakland	182,797	61.44%	114,025	38.33%	686	0.23%	68,772	23.11%	297,508
Oceana	3,773	55.95%	2,958	43.87%	12	0.18%	815	12.08%	6,743
Ogemaw	2,812	63.55%	1,609	36.36%	4	0.09%	1,203	27.19%	4,425
Ontonagon	3,485	67.67%	1,658	32.19%	7	0.14%	1,827	35.48%	5,150
Osceola	2,891	50.81%	2,779	48.84%	20	0.35%	112	1.97%	5,690
Oscoda	930	54.04%	784	45.55%	7	0.41%	146	8.49%	1,721
Otsego	2,245	64.85%	1,214	35.07%	3	0.09%	1,031	29.78%	3,462
Ottawa	20,151	45.05%	24,512	54.79%	72	0.16%	-4,361	-9.74%	44,735
Presque Isle	3,565	66.80%	1,770	33.16%	2	0.04%	1,795	33.64%	5,337
Roscommon	2,345	57.56%	1,722	42.27%	7	0.17%	623	15.29%	4,074
Saginaw	45,309	61.58%	28,146	38.25%	127	0.17%	17,163	23.33%	73,582
Sanilac	6,266	45.16%	7,590	54.71%	18	0.13%	-1,324	-9.55%	13,874
Schoolcraft	2,675	65.63%	1,397	34.27%	4	0.10%	1,278	31.36%	4,076
Shiawassee	13,676	63.60%	7,786	36.21%	41	0.19%	5,890	27.39%	21,503
St. Clair	24,662	59.09%	17,011	40.76%	62	0.15%	7,651	18.33%	41,735
St. Joseph	9,284	55.85%	7,307	43.96%	32	0.19%	1,977	11.89%	16,623
Tuscola	9,374	55.45%	7,509	44.42%	22	0.13%	1,865	11.03%	16,905
Van Buren	11,336	58.12%	8,120	41.63%	48	0.25%	3,216	16.49%	19,504
Washtenaw	42,089	62.00%	25,595	37.70%	206	0.30%	16,494	24.30%	67,890
Wayne	831,674	75.97%	260,901	23.83%	2,149	0.20%	570,773	52.14%	1,094,724
Wexford	4,414	59.28%	3,016	40.50%	16	0.21%	1,398	18.78%	7,446
Totals	2,136,615	66.70%	1,060,152	33.10%	6,335	0.20%	1,076,463	33.60%	3,203,102

==== Counties that flipped from Republican to Democratic ====
- Alcona
- Allegan
- Alpena
- Antrim
- Arenac
- Barry
- Benzie
- Berrien
- Branch
- Calhoun
- Cass
- Charlevoix
- Cheboygan
- Chippewa
- Clare
- Clinton
- Crawford
- Eaton
- Emmet
- Genesee
- Gladwin
- Grand Traverse
- Gratiot
- Hillsdale
- Huron
- Ingham
- Ionia
- Iosco
- Isabella
- Jackson
- Kalamazoo
- Kalkaska
- Kent
- Keweenaw
- Lake
- Lapeer
- Leelanau
- Lenawee
- Livingston
- Luce
- Mackinac
- Manistee
- Mason
- Mecosta
- Midland
- Montcalm
- Montmorency
- Muskegon
- Newaygo
- Oakland
- Oceana
- Ogemaw
- Ontonagon
- Osceola
- Oscoda
- Otsego
- Presque Isle
- Roscommon
- Saginaw
- Schoolcraft
- Shiawassee
- St. Clair
- St. Joseph
- Tuscola
- Van Buren
- Washtenaw
- Wexford

== See also ==
- United States presidential elections in Michigan
