= Otsego Lake (Michigan) =

Lake in Otsego County, Michigan, U.S.

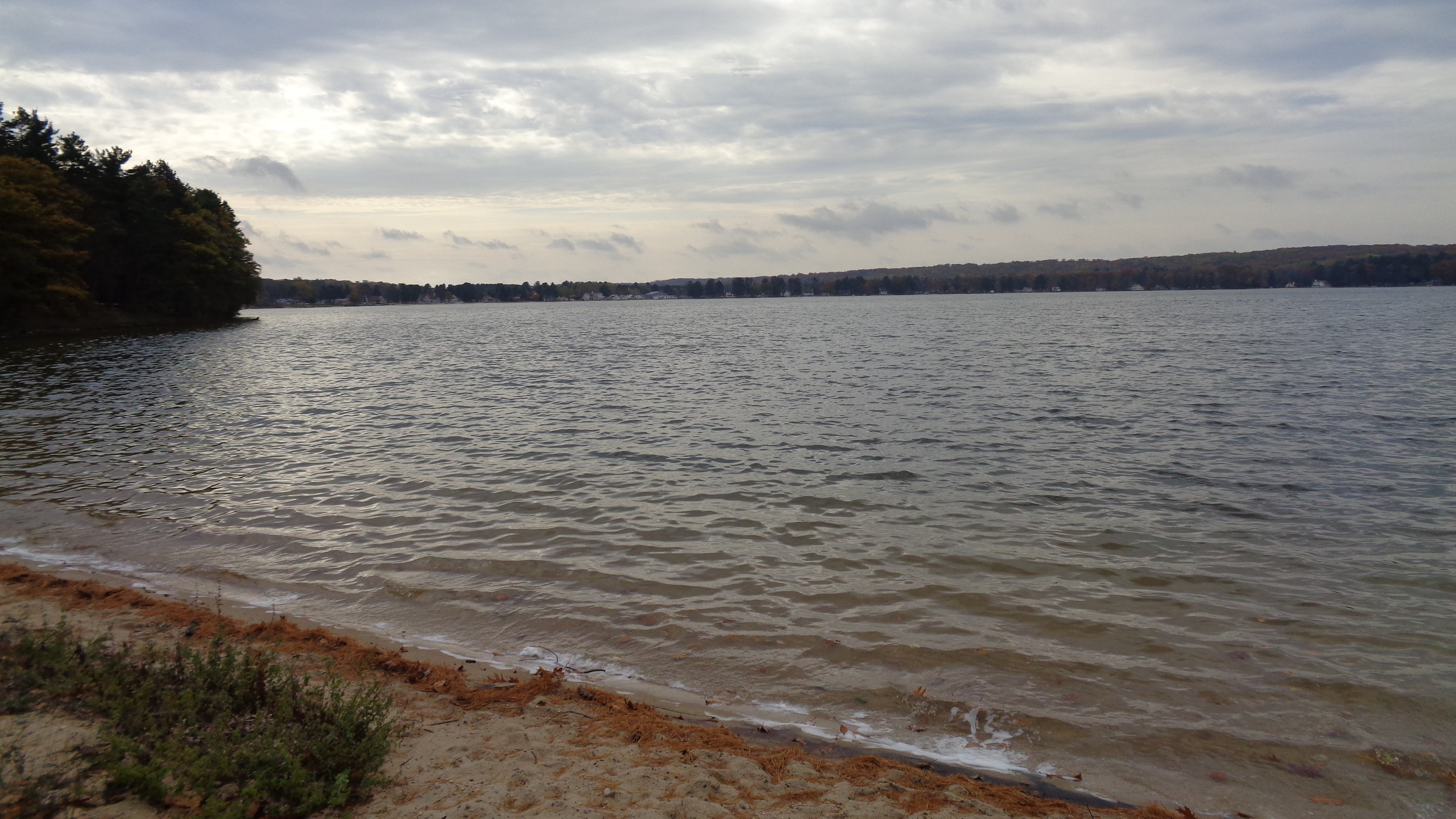
- View from Otsego Lake State Park

- Location within the state of Michigan Otsego Lake (the United States)
- Location: Otsego County, Michigan
- Coordinates: 44°57′20″N 84°41′32″W
- Type: Lake
- Basin countries: United States
- Max. length: 5.0 mi (8 km)
- Max. width: 0.99 mi (1.6 km)
- Surface area: 3.08 sq mi (7.98 km^{2})
- Average depth: 8 ft (2.4 m)
- Max. depth: 23 ft (7.0 m)
- Surface elevation: 1,270 ft (390 m)

bathymetric map of Otsego Lake

Otsego Lake (/ɒtˈsiːɡoʊ/ ot-SEE-goh) is located in northwest Michigan at 44°57′20″N 84°41′32″W, south of the city of Gaylord in Otsego County. The lake spans the boundary between Otsego Lake Township to the south and Bagley Township to the north. Otsego Lake State Park is located on the southeast shore of the lake and Otsego County Park is on the northwest shore. The lake has many private cottages and homes with direct access to the lake and parks.

== History ==
Otsego Lake was the long-time summer residence of Arthur Compton. Compton received the Nobel Prize for physics in 1927 for his work with X-rays and what later became known as the "Compton effect". During World War II, he was a key figure in the Manhattan Project that developed the first nuclear weapons. In the late 1950s, noted American architect and Frank Lloyd Wright protege, William Adair Bernoudy, designed Compton's retirement home on the lake directly across from Otsego Lake State Park.

== Dimensions ==
Otsego Lake is 1,972 acres (7.98 km^{2}), and 5 miles (8.0 km) long and 1 mile (1.6 km) at its widest. In general, it is a shallow lake averaging about 6–8 feet in most places, with a maximum depth of approximately 23 feet (7.0 m) in a few spots. The bottom shoal composed of sand and light gravel forms many "drop-offs" and holes. The lake is full of vegetation which is submerged at the bottom of the lake with very little floating vegetation.

== Lake activities ==
There are an abundance of boats that frequent the lake during the busy times of year which bring along many skiers and boarders, as well as many tubing activities. Fisherman can also be seen scattered throughout the lake as well as the occasional seaplane.

== Fish ==
The following fish can be found in the lake and are subject to fishing:

- Muskelunge
- Lake Sturgeon
- Northern pike
- Largemouth bass
- Smallmouth bass
- Rock bass
- Bluegill
- Yellow perch
- Pumpkinseed sunfish
- Walleye

== See also ==
- List of lakes in Michigan
