= Otsego Lake State Park =

Park in Michigan, United States

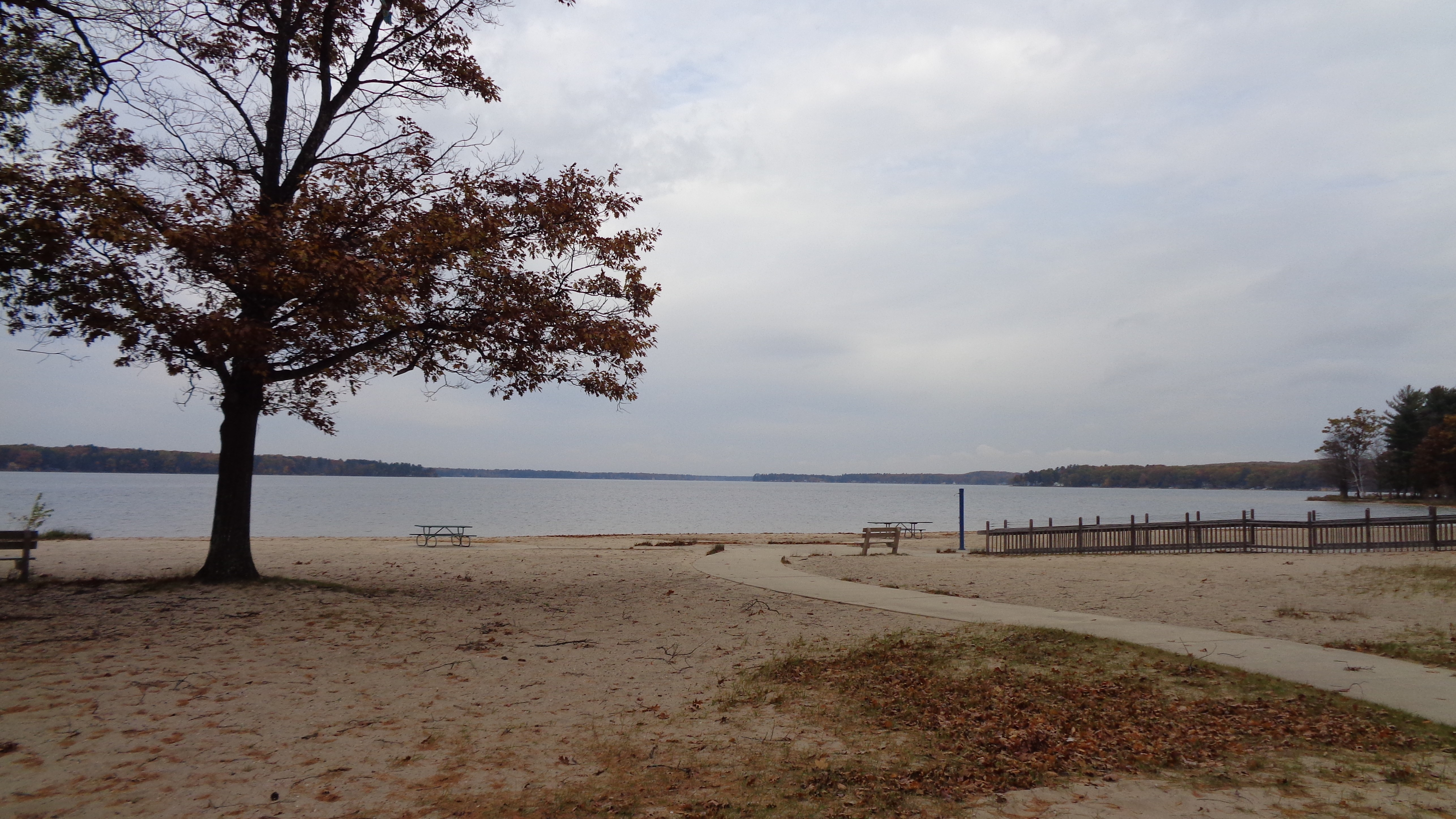
- Beachfront along Otsego Lake

- Location within Michigan Location within the United States
- Location: Otsego County, Michigan, United States
- Nearest city: Gaylord, Michigan
- Coordinates: 44°55′58″N 84°41′20″W
- Area: 62 acres (25 ha)
- Elevation: 1,293 feet (394 m)
- Established: 1920
- Administrator: Michigan Department of Natural Resources
- Designation: Michigan state park
- Website: Official website

Otsego Lake State Park is a public recreation area covering 62 acres (25 ha) on the southeast shore of Otsego Lake in Otsego Lake Township, Otsego County, Michigan.

== History ==
The park was among 13 parks established in 1920 following the creation of the Michigan State Parks Commission in 1919. Improvements made by the Civilian Conservation Corps in the 1930s included a wood-frame bathhouse constructed in 1934.

== Activities and amenities ==
The park offers fishing, swimming, picnicking facilities, boat launch, and 155-site campground.
