= Gaylord Regional Airport =

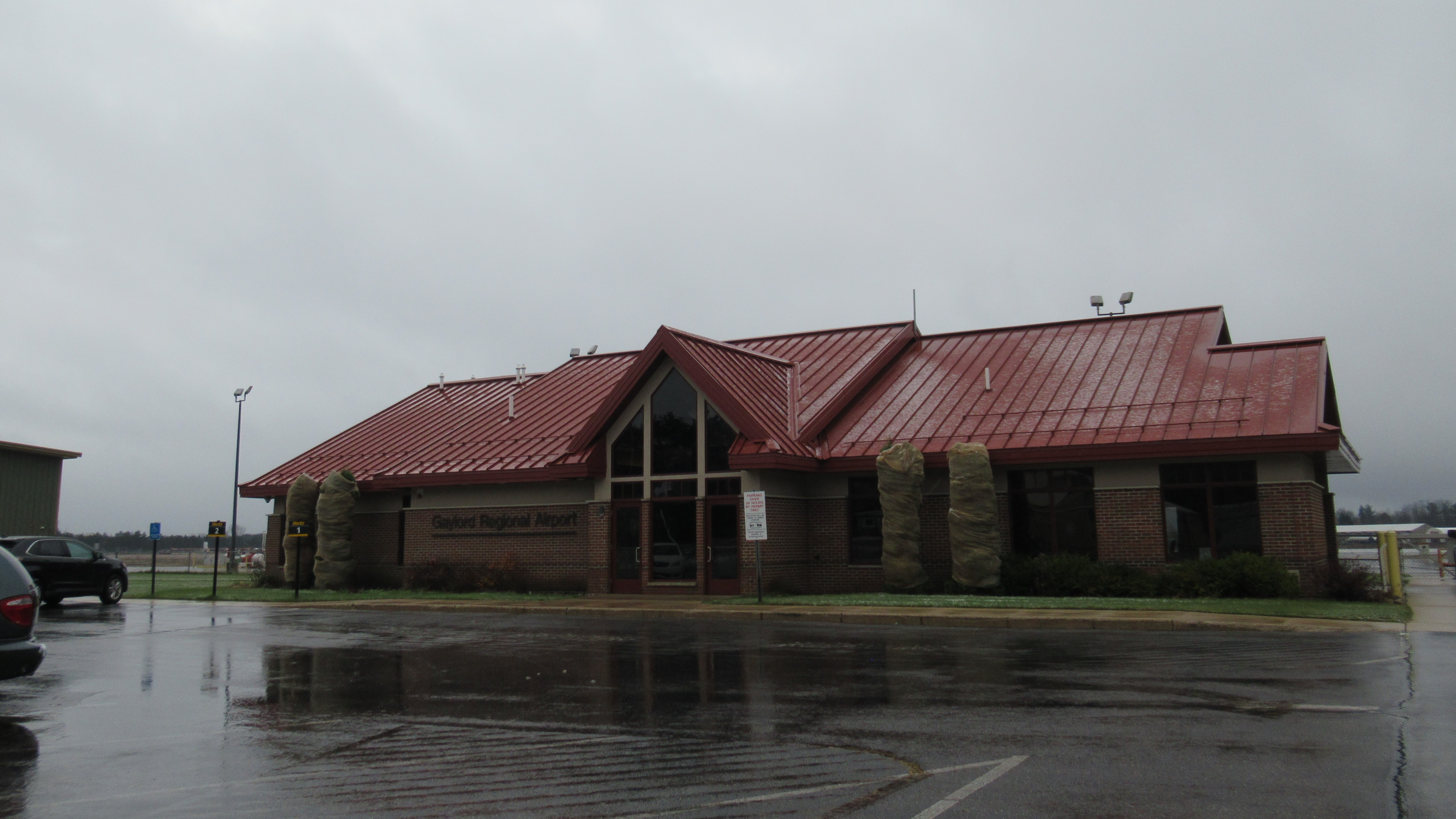
- Main terminal building
- IATA: GLR; ICAO: KGLR; FAA LID: GLR

Summary
- Airport type: Public
- Owner: County of Otsego
- Serves: Gaylord, Michigan
- Elevation AMSL: 1,328 ft (405 m)
- Coordinates: 45°00′47″N 084°42′12″W

Map
- Location of airport in Michigan GLR (the United States)

Runways
Direction	Length		Surface
Direction	ft	m	Surface
9/27	6,579	2,005	Asphalt
18/36	4,200	1,280	Asphalt

Statistics (2020)
- Aircraft operations: 10,000
- Based aircraft: 25
- Source: Federal Aviation Administration

Gaylord Regional Airport (IATA: GLR, ICAO: KGLR, FAA LID: GLR) is a county-owned, public-use airport located in Bagley Township one nautical mile (1.2 mi; 1.9 km) southwest of the central business district of Gaylord, Michigan, United States. It is included in the Federal Aviation Administration (FAA) National Plan of Integrated Airport Systems for 2017–2021, in which it is categorized as a local general aviation facility.

== Facilities and aircraft ==
Gaylord Regional Airport covers an area of 1,572 acres (636 ha) at an elevation of 1,328 feet (405 m) above mean sea level. It has two asphalt runways: 9/27 is 6,579 by 150 feet (2,005 by 46 m) and 18/36 is 4,200 by 75 feet (1,280 by 23 m).

For the 12-month period ending December 31, 2020, the airport had about 10,000 aircraft operations, or 27 per day. It was composed entirely of general aviation. For the same time period, there are 25 aircraft based on the field: 16 single-engine and 7 multi-engine airplanes, 1 jet, and 1 helicopter.

The airport is staffed seven days a week from 7:00 a.m. until 5:00 p.m. It is listed as a tier one airport in all categories of the Michigan Airport System Plan. The airport is accessible by road from Van Tyle Road, and is close to M-32 and Interstate 75.

The airport has one fixed base operator. It offers fuel, ground handling, refreshments, a conference room, a shower, snooze rooms, a lounge, office space, and more.

== Accidents & Incidents ==
- On October 24, 2000, a Piper PA-28 impacted trees and terrain while flying the Instrument Landing System approach to the airport. The cause of the accident was found to be the pilot's failure to maintain proper glideslope and localizer alignment during a precision approach, the pilot's decision to continue the flight below decision height without executing a missed approach, and the pilot's failure to maintain altitude clearance.

== See also ==
- List of airports in Michigan
