= Green Light Radio =

Unlicensed radio station in Colorado, US

Green Light Radio (KGLR) is an unlicensed radio station broadcasting in Boulder, Colorado on the FM radio frequency 93.1 MHz (was on 95.3 MHz between 2008 and 2012). This loosely organized group of volunteers utilize a "cat and mouse" method of broadcasting in order to dodge accountability to the Federal Communications Commission (FCC). The station founders believe each community should have control over what appears on its waves".
