= Livingston Township, Michigan =

- Civil township
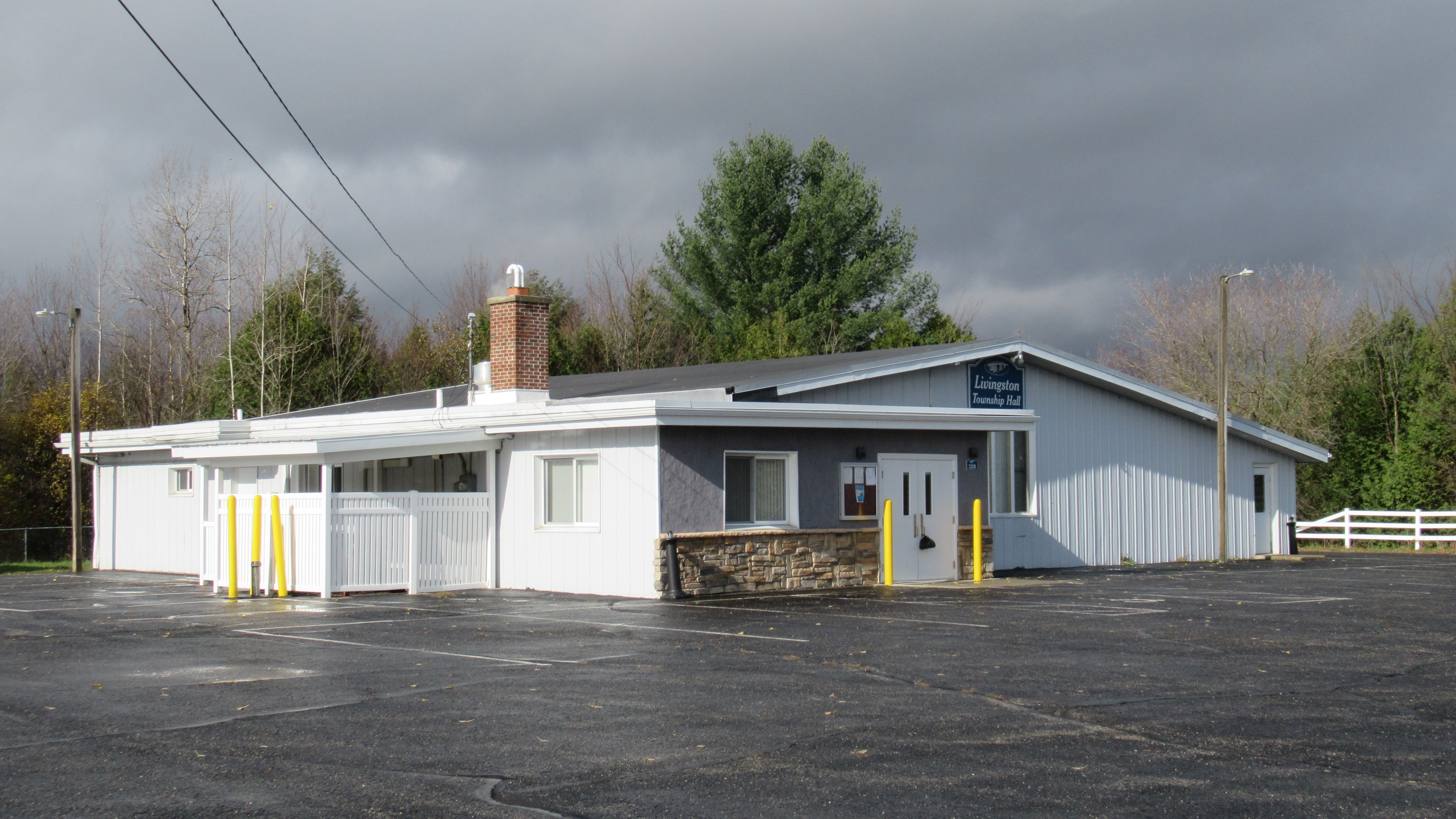
- Livingston Township Hall

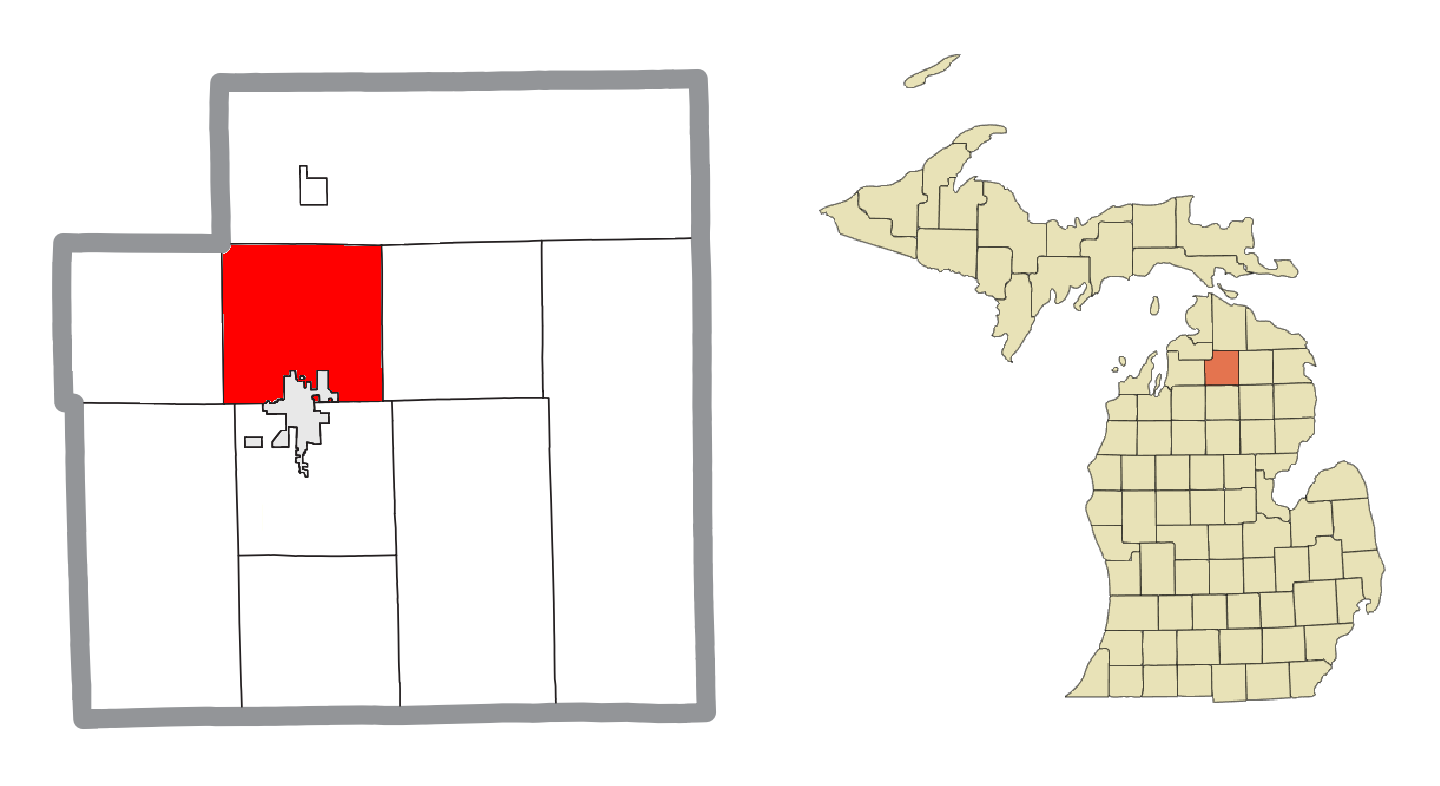
- Location within Otsego County

- Location within the state of Michigan Location within the United States
- Coordinates: 45°03′57″N 84°40′40″W
- Country: United States
- State: Michigan
- County: Otsego
- Established: 1875

Government
  - Supervisor: Norm Brecheisen
  - Clerk: Elizabeth Mench

Area
  - Total: 34.06 sq mi (88.21 km^{2})
  - Land: 33.77 sq mi (87.46 km^{2})
  - Water: 0.69 sq mi (1.79 km^{2})
- Elevation: 1,230 ft (375 m)

Population (2020)
  - Total: 2,652
  - Density: 78.53/sq mi (30.32/km^{2})
- Time zone: UTC-5 (Eastern (EST))
  - Summer (DST): UTC-4 (EDT)
- ZIP code(s): 49735 (Gaylord); 49795 (Vanderbilt)
- Area code: 989
- FIPS code: 26-48140
- GNIS feature ID: 1626632
- Website: https://livingstontownshipmi.gov/

Livingston Township is a civil township of Otsego County in the U.S. state of Michigan. The population was 2,652 at the 2020 census.

== Communities ==
- Logan was a small settlement on the boundary between Livingston and Corwith Townships, about six miles north of Gaylord, formed around the sawmill and general store of the Yuill Brothers. It was a station on the Mackinaw division of the Michigan Central Railroad. A post office operated from May 1880 until August 1883.

== Geography ==
According to the U.S. Census Bureau, the township has a total area of 34.06 square miles (88.21 km^{2}), of which 33.77 square miles (87.46 km^{2}) is land and 0.69 square miles (1.79 km^{2}) (2.03%) is water.

== Demographics ==
As of the census of 2000, there were 2,339 people, 839 households, and 668 families residing in the township. The population density was 69.0 inhabitants per square mile (26.6/km^{2}). There were 935 housing units at an average density of 27.6 units per square mile (10.7 units/km^{2}). The racial makeup of the township was 97.35% White, 0.09% African American, 0.60% Native American, 0.51% Asian, 0.09% from other races, and 1.37% from two or more races. Hispanic or Latino of any race were 0.30% of the population.

There were 839 households, out of which 39.3% had children under the age of 18 living with them, 69.7% were married couples living together, 7.4% had a female householder with no husband present, and 20.3% were non-families. 17.3% of all households were made up of individuals, and 5.5% had someone living alone who was 65 years of age or older. The average household size was 2.77 and the average family size was 3.11.

In the township the population was spread out, with 28.5% under the age of 18, 6.6% from 18 to 24, 29.2% from 25 to 44, 25.4% from 45 to 64, and 10.2% who were 65 years of age or older. The median age was 38 years. For every 100 females, there were 100.6 males. For every 100 females age 18 and over, there were 99.0 males.

The median income for a household in the township was $51,293, and the median income for a family was $55,156. Males had a median income of $37,222 versus $22,436 for females. The per capita income for the township was $21,798. About 2.2% of families and 2.9% of the population were below the poverty line, including 3.1% of those under age 18 and 3.1% of those age 65 or over.
