= Chester Township, Otsego County, Michigan =

Chester Township, Michigan
- Civil township
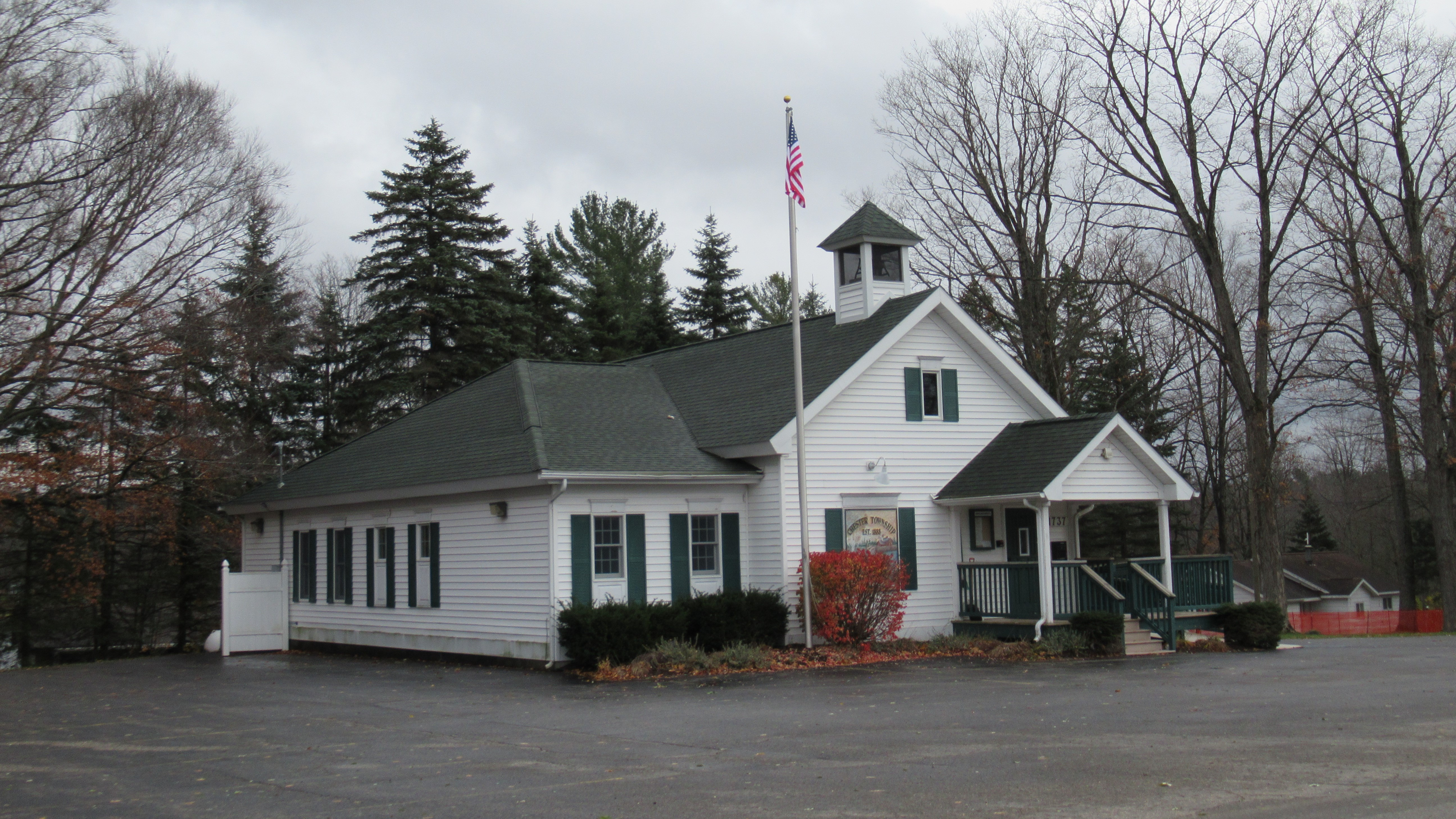
- Chester Township Hall

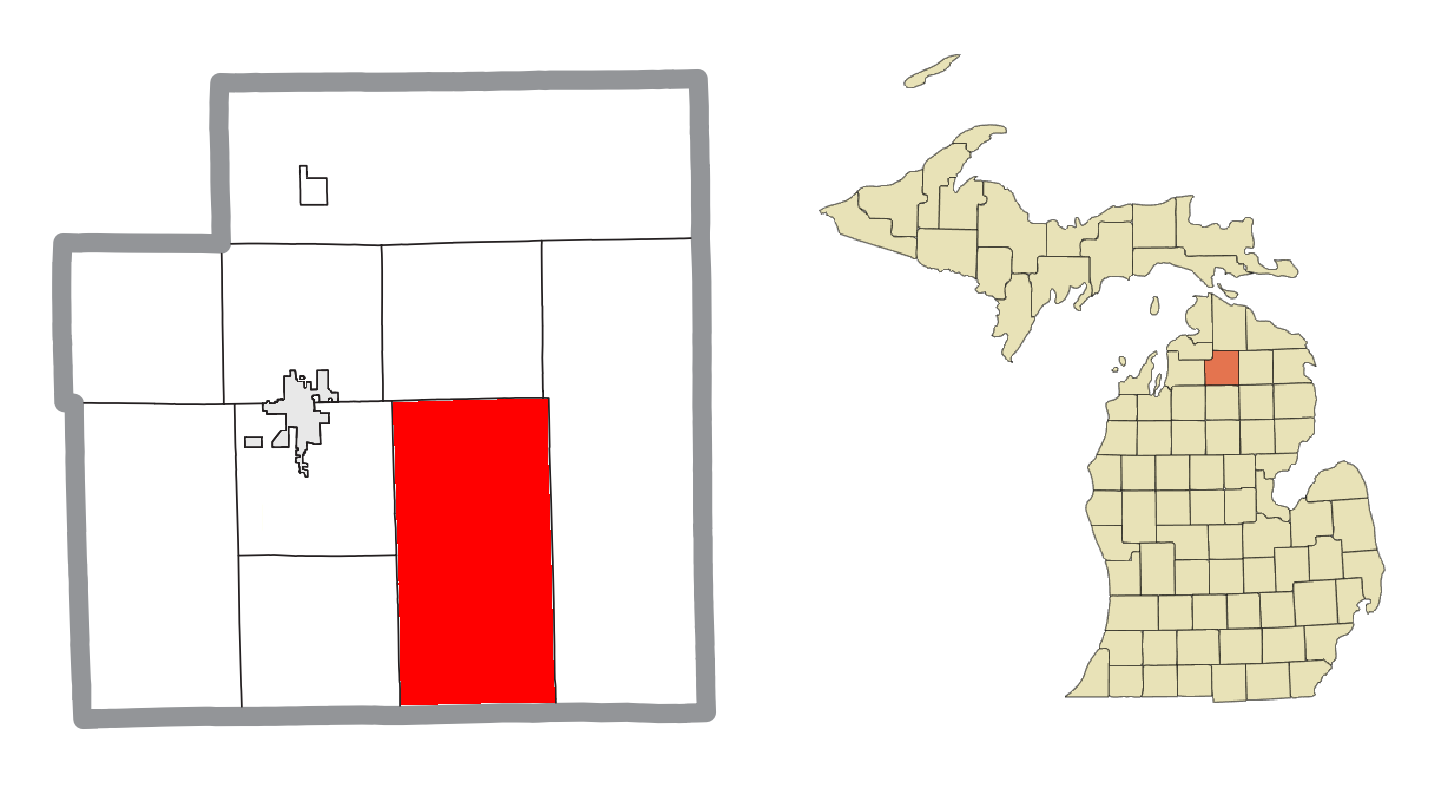
- Location within Otsego County

- Location within the state of Michigan Location within the United States
- Coordinates: 44°55′25″N 84°32′26″W
- Country: United States
- State: Michigan
- County: Otsego
- Established: 1888

Government
  - Supervisor: Bonny Miller
  - Clerk: Melissa Szymanski

Area
  - Total: 68.74 sq mi (178.04 km^{2})
  - Land: 67.56 sq mi (174.98 km^{2})
  - Water: 1.18 sq mi (3.06 km^{2})
- Elevation: 1,266 ft (386 m)

Population (2020)
  - Total: 1,300
  - Density: 19/sq mi (7.4/km^{2})
- Time zone: UTC-5 (Eastern (EST))
  - Summer (DST): UTC-4 (EDT)
- ZIP code(s): 49735 (Gaylord); 49751 (Johannesburg)·
- Area code: 989
- FIPS code: 26-15280
- GNIS feature ID: 1626072
- Website: https://www.chester-township.com/

Chester Township is a civil township of Otsego County in the U.S. state of Michigan. The population was 1,300 at the 2020 census.

== Communities ==
- Farrar Landing is an unincorporated community located on the township line with Otsego Lake Township along Chub Creek at 44°52′36″N 84°36′16″W.
- Lower Chub Landing is an unincorporated community located within the township along Chub Creek at 44°53′27″N 84°35′04″W.
- Whites Landing is an unincorporated community located within the township at 44°54′26″N 84°34′21″W.

== Geography ==
According to the U.S. Census Bureau, the township has a total area of 68.74 square miles (178.04 km^{2}), of which 67.56 square miles (174.98 km^{2}) is land and 1.18 square miles (3.06 km^{2}) (1.72%) is water.

== Demographics ==
As of the census of 2000, there were 1,265 people, 481 households, and 370 families residing in the township. The population density was 18.7 inhabitants per square mile (7.2/km^{2}). There were 858 housing units at an average density of 12.7 per square mile (4.9/km^{2}). The racial makeup of the township was 99.21% White, 0.24% African American, 0.08% Asian, 0.08% from other races, and 0.40% from two or more races. Hispanic or Latino of any race were 0.08% of the population.

There were 481 households, out of which 34.5% had children under the age of 18 living with them, 65.7% were married couples living together, 7.3% had a female householder with no husband present, and 22.9% were non-families. 19.8% of all households were made up of individuals, and 7.9% had someone living alone who was 65 years of age or older. The average household size was 2.63 and the average family size was 3.01.

In the township the population was spread out, with 26.1% under the age of 18, 7.4% from 18 to 24, 29.5% from 25 to 44, 23.3% from 45 to 64, and 13.8% who were 65 years of age or older. The median age was 37 years. For every 100 females, there were 102.4 males. For every 100 females age 18 and over, there were 104.6 males.

The median income for a household in the township was $42,368, and the median income for a family was $47,011. Males had a median income of $34,286 versus $20,302 for females. The per capita income for the township was $18,479. About 4.9% of families and 5.0% of the population were below the poverty line, including 6.7% of those under age 18 and 2.3% of those age 65 or over.
