= Otsego Lake Township, Michigan =

- Civil township
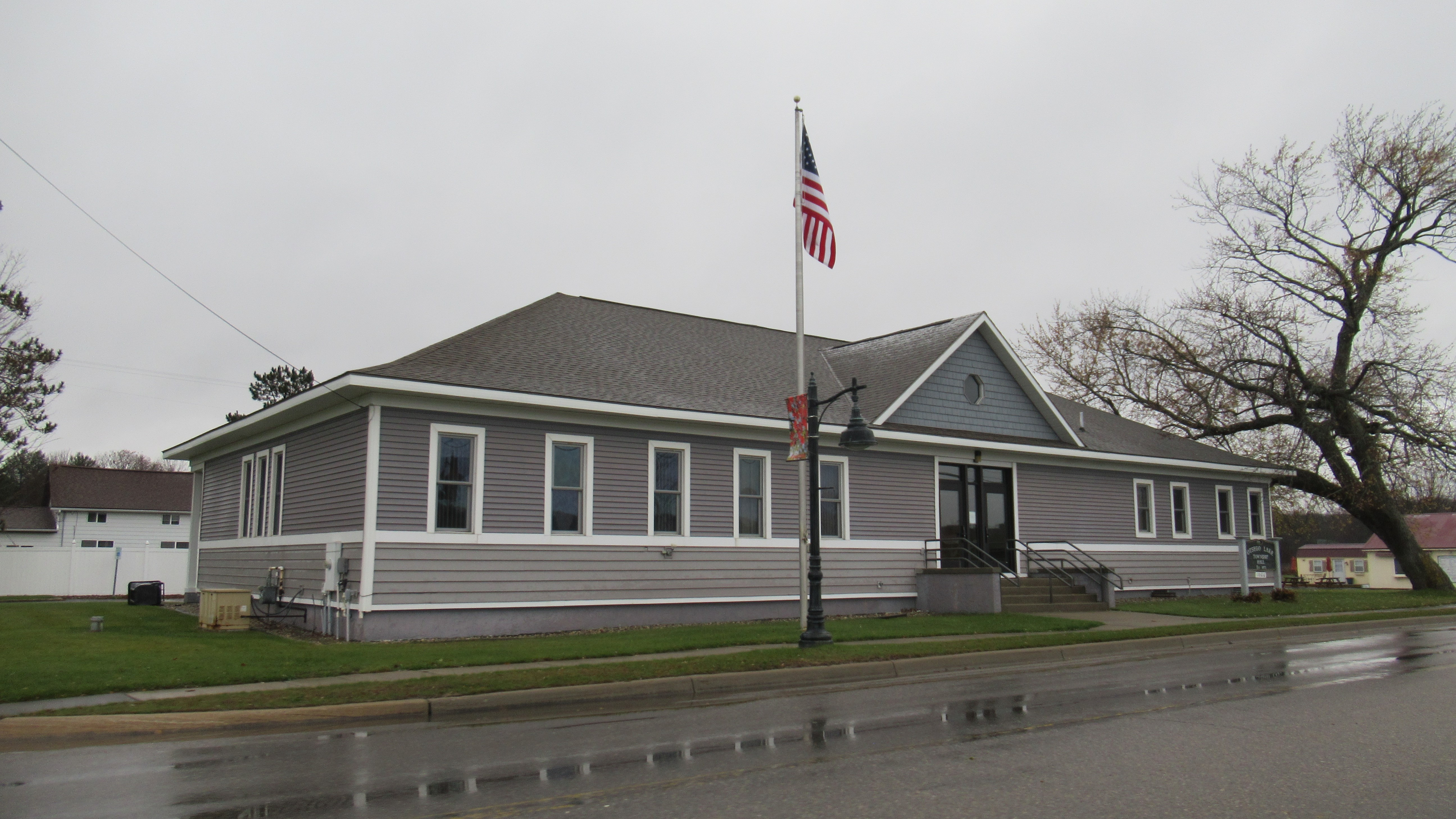
- Otsego Lake Township Hall in Waters

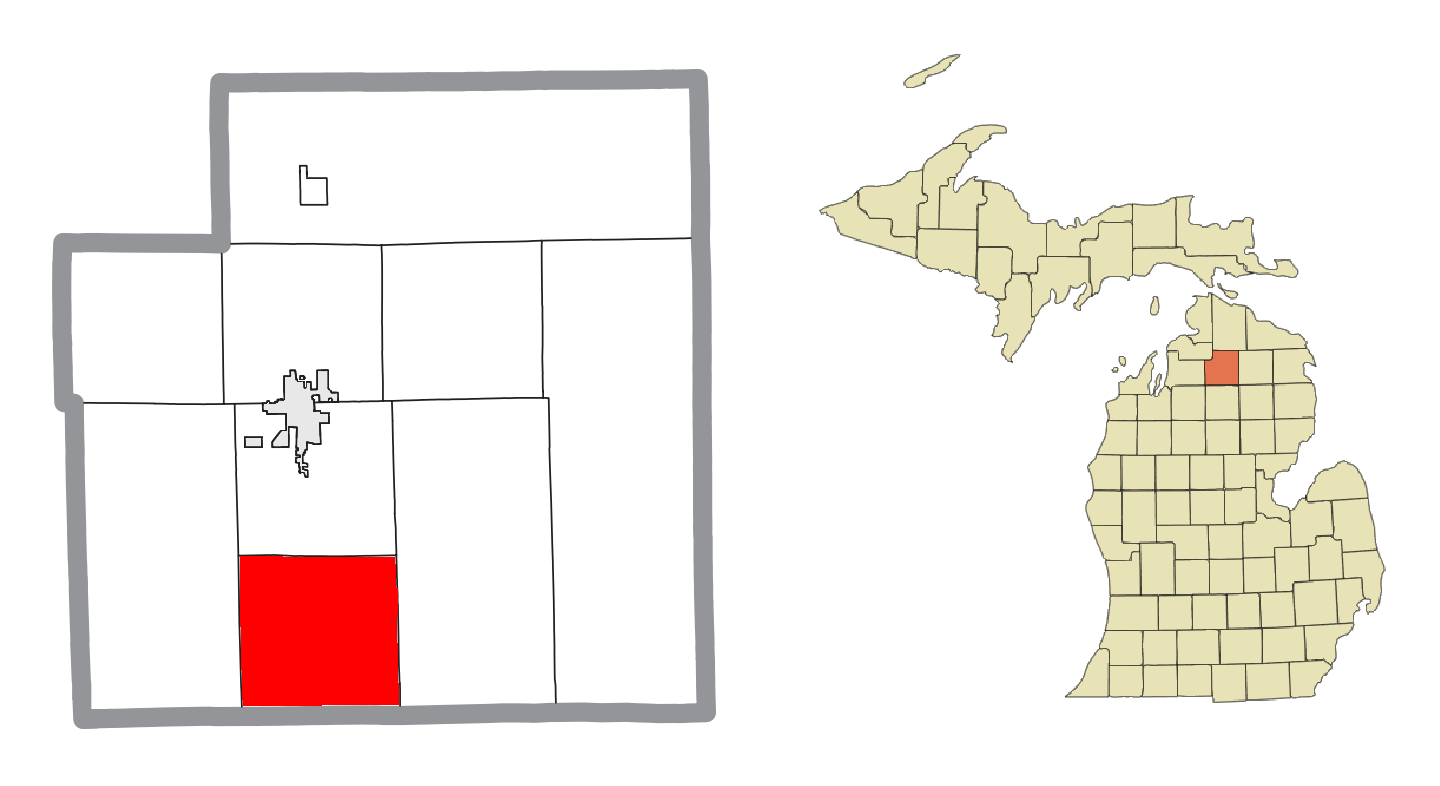
- Location within Otsego County

- Location within the state of Michigan Location within the United States
- Coordinates: 44°54′13″N 84°40′14″W
- Country: United States
- State: Michigan
- County: Otsego
- Established: 1875

Government
  - Supervisor: Dave Matelski
  - Clerk: Mary Brown

Area
  - Total: 35.42 sq mi (91.74 km^{2})
  - Land: 32.72 sq mi (84.74 km^{2})
  - Water: 2.70 sq mi (6.99 km^{2})
- Elevation: 1,421 ft (433 m)

Population (2020)
  - Total: 2,857
  - Density: 87.32/sq mi (33.71/km^{2})
- Time zone: UTC-5 (Eastern (EST))
  - Summer (DST): UTC-4 (EDT)
- ZIP code(s): 49733 (Frederic); 49735 (Gaylord); 49797 (Waters)
- Area code: 989
- FIPS code: 26-61680
- GNIS feature ID: 1626870
- Website: Official website

Otsego Lake Township is a civil township of Otsego County in the U.S. state of Michigan. The population was 2,857 at the 2020 census.

The township takes its name from Otsego Lake, in which the southern half is within the township. Otsego Lake State Park is located in the township on the southeast shore of the lake.

== Communities ==
- Artubus Beach is an unincorporated community located on the township line with Bagley Township on the eastern shores of Otsego Lake at 44°56′46″N 84°41′00″W. It was settled as a small resort community, and its name comes from both its shoreline on Otsego Lake and the abundant Arbutus in the nearby woods.
- Farrar Landing is an unincorporated community located on the township line with Chester Township along Chub Creek at 44°52′36″N 84°36′16″W.
- Otsego Lake is an unincorporated community located within the township at the southern end of Otsego Lake at 44°55′01″N 84°41′33″W. It is centered along the junction of county highways C-38 and F-38 just east of Interstate 75. The community was settled along the Jackson, Lansing and Saginaw Railroad in 1872 and was named after the lake. A post office opened on July 23, 1873 and operated until February 15, 1932. The community served briefly as the first county seat of Otsego County from 1875 to 1877.
- Waters is an unincorporated community located in the southwestern portion of the township at 44°52′47″N 84°41′55″W.

== Geography ==
According to the U.S. Census Bureau, the township has a total area of 35.42 square miles (91.74 km^{2}), of which 32.72 square miles (84.74 km^{2}) is land and 2.70 square miles (6.99 km^{2}) (7.62%) is water.

== Demographics ==
As of the census of 2000, there were 2,532 people, 1,070 households, and 786 families residing in the township. The population density was 77.3 inhabitants per square mile (29.8/km^{2}). There were 2,028 housing units at an average density of 61.9 per square mile (23.9/km^{2}). The racial makeup of the township was 98.30% White, 0.12% African American, 0.36% Native American, 0.04% from other races, and 1.18% from two or more races. Hispanic or Latino of any race were 0.32% of the population.

There were 1,070 households, out of which 26.4% had children under the age of 18 living with them, 64.6% were married couples living together, 5.2% had a female householder with no husband present, and 26.5% were non-families. 22.1% of all households were made up of individuals, and 9.6% had someone living alone who was 65 years of age or older. The average household size was 2.37 and the average family size was 2.74.

In the township the population was spread out, with 22.3% under the age of 18, 4.4% from 18 to 24, 25.0% from 25 to 44, 27.8% from 45 to 64, and 20.5% who were 65 years of age or older. The median age was 44 years. For every 100 females, there were 107.0 males. For every 100 females age 18 and over, there were 101.1 males.

The median income for a household in the township was $44,351, and the median income for a family was $50,403. Males had a median income of $36,927 versus $24,375 for females. The per capita income for the township was $23,350. About 4.5% of families and 6.5% of the population were below the poverty line, including 10.4% of those under age 18 and 2.7% of those age 65 or over.

== Images ==
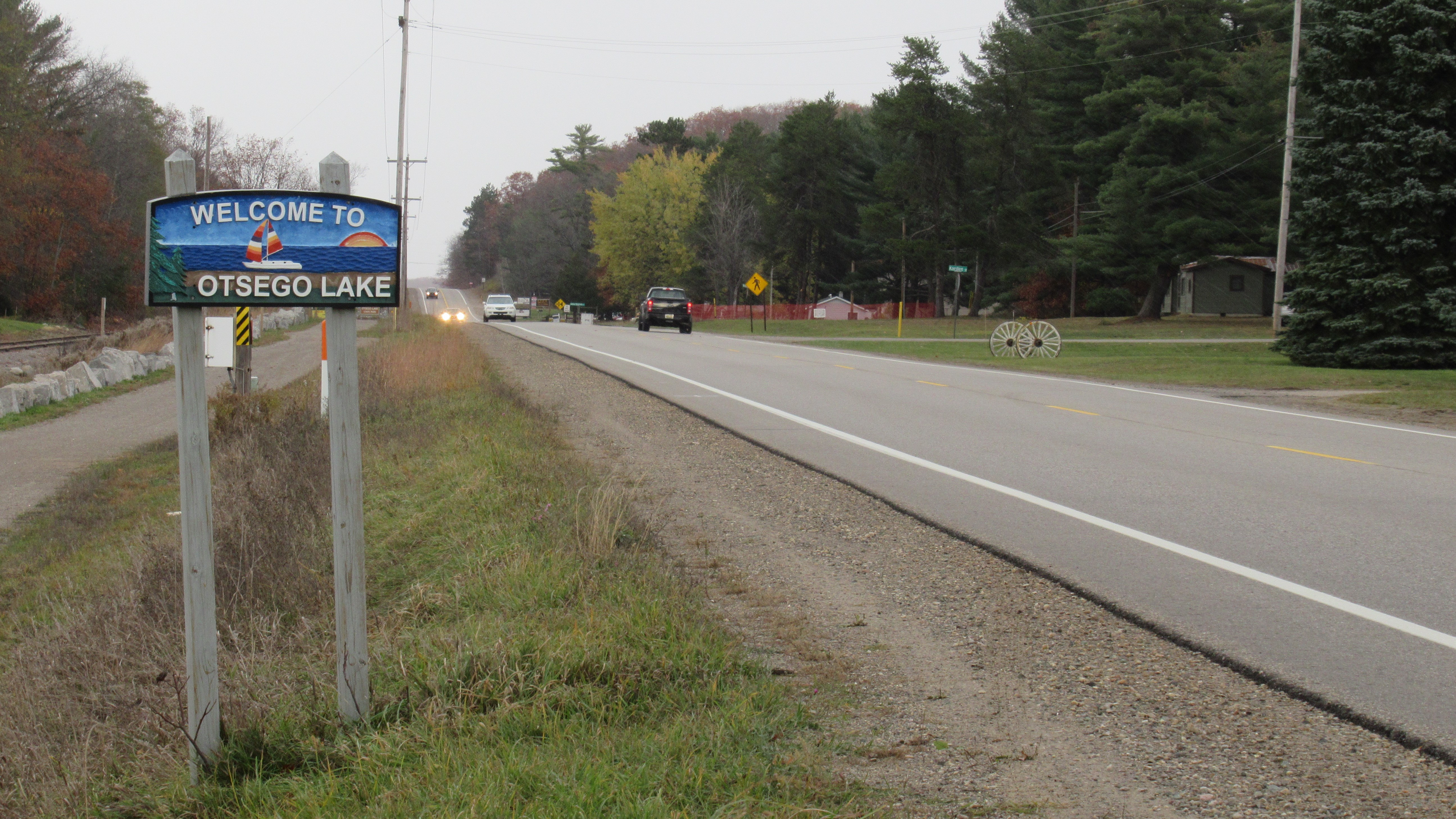
Community of Otsego Lake

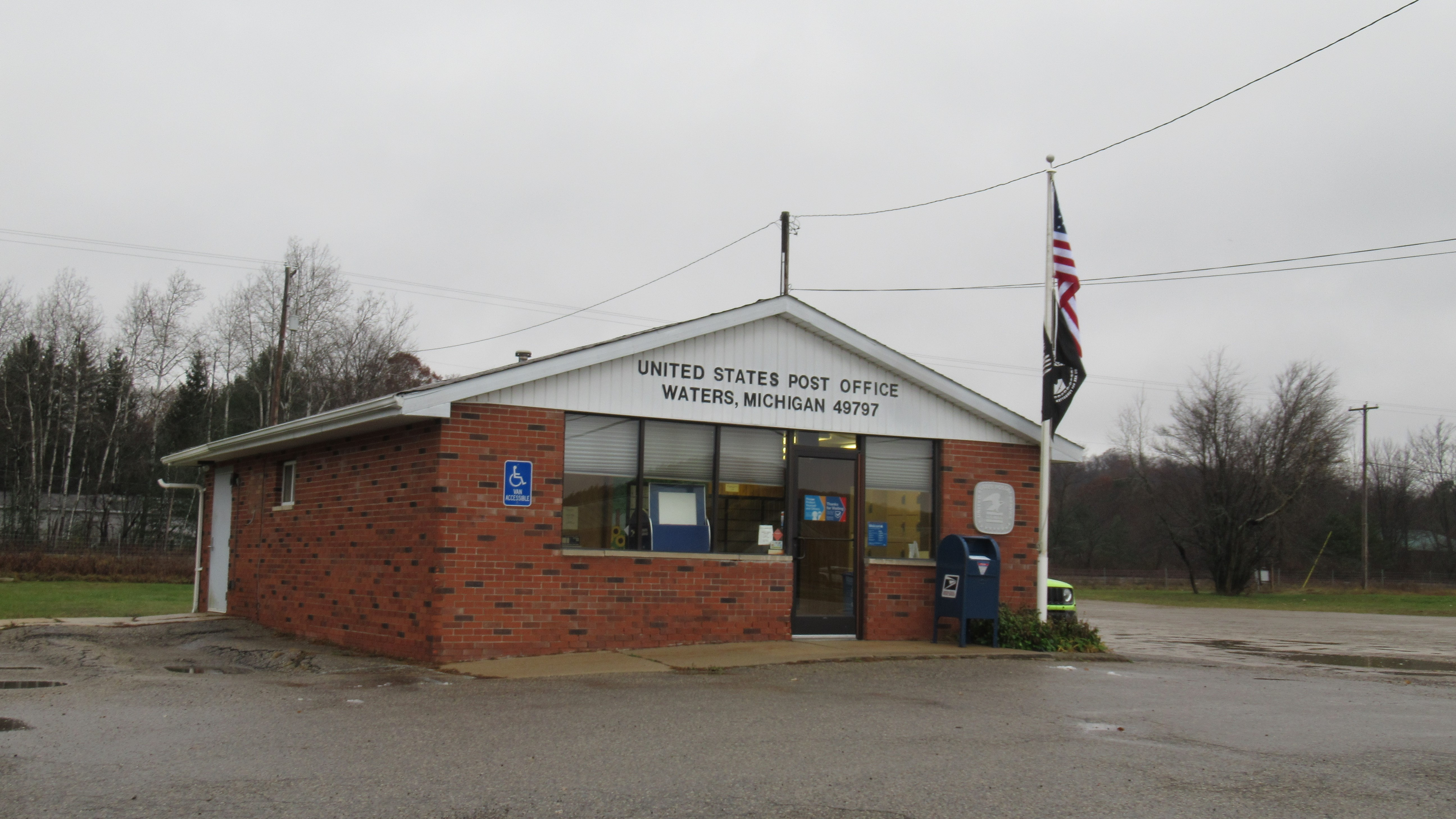
U.S. Post Office in Waters

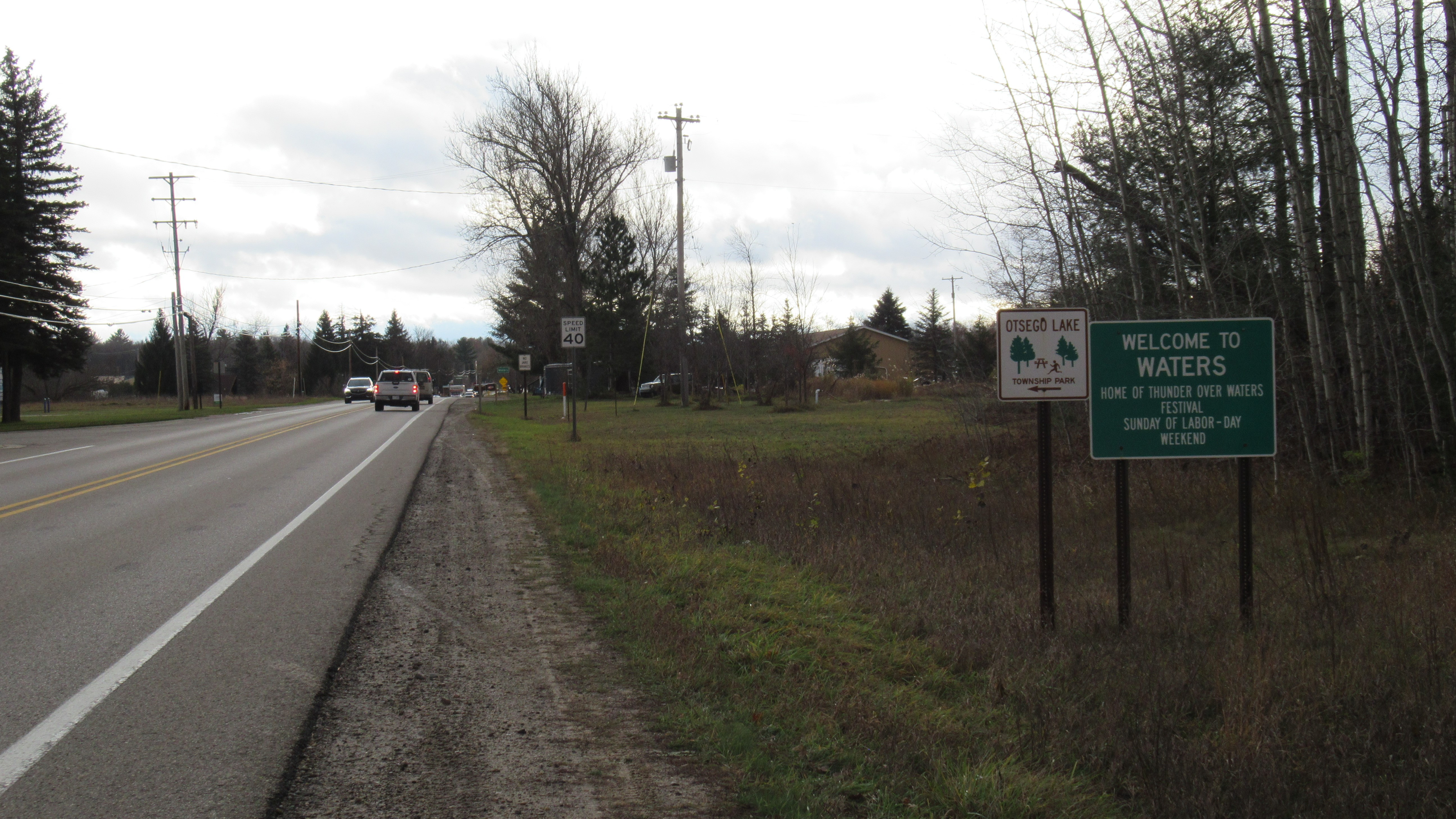
Waters signage along Old Highway 27
