= Bagley Township, Michigan =

- Civil township
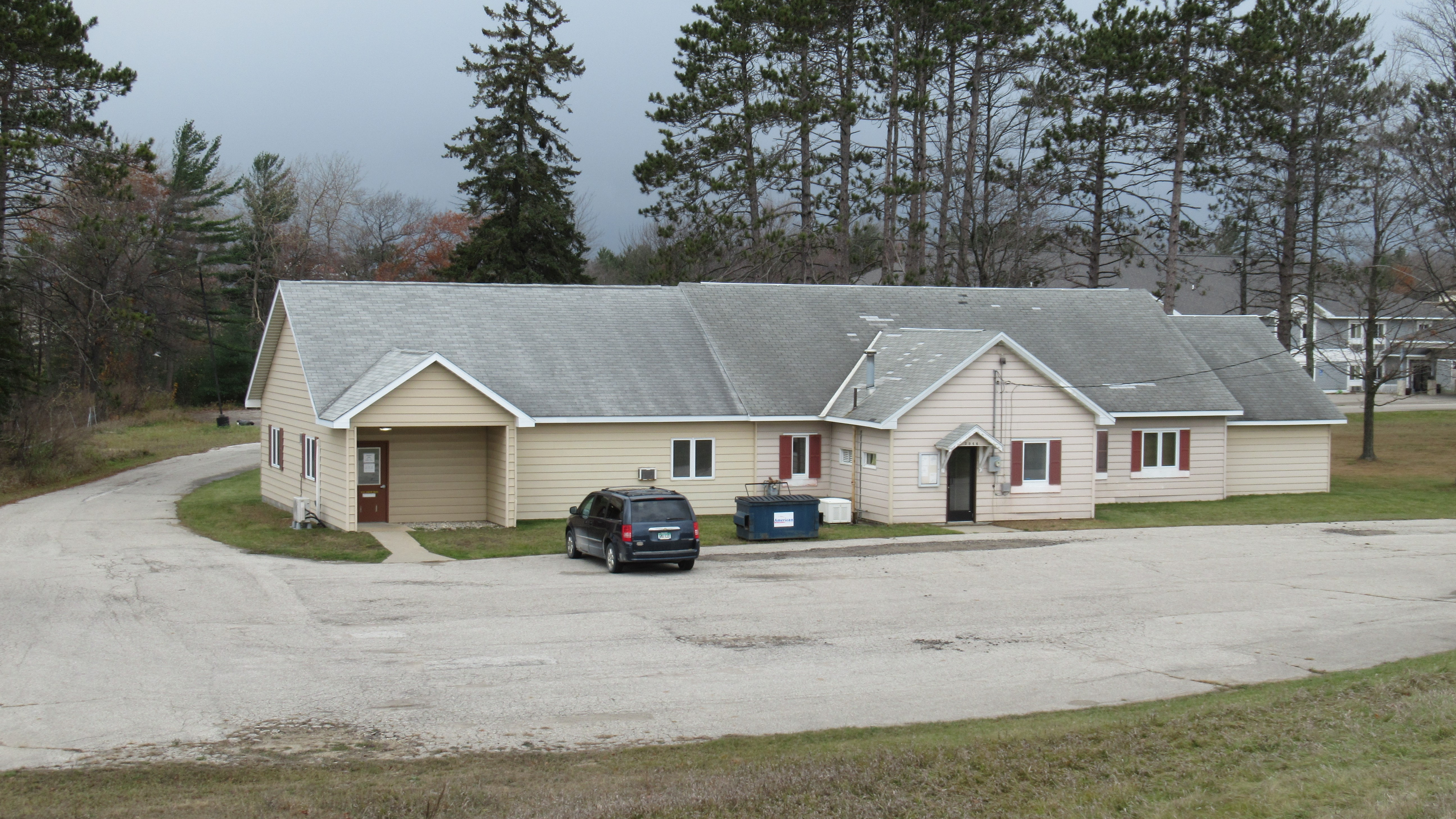
- Bagley Township Hall

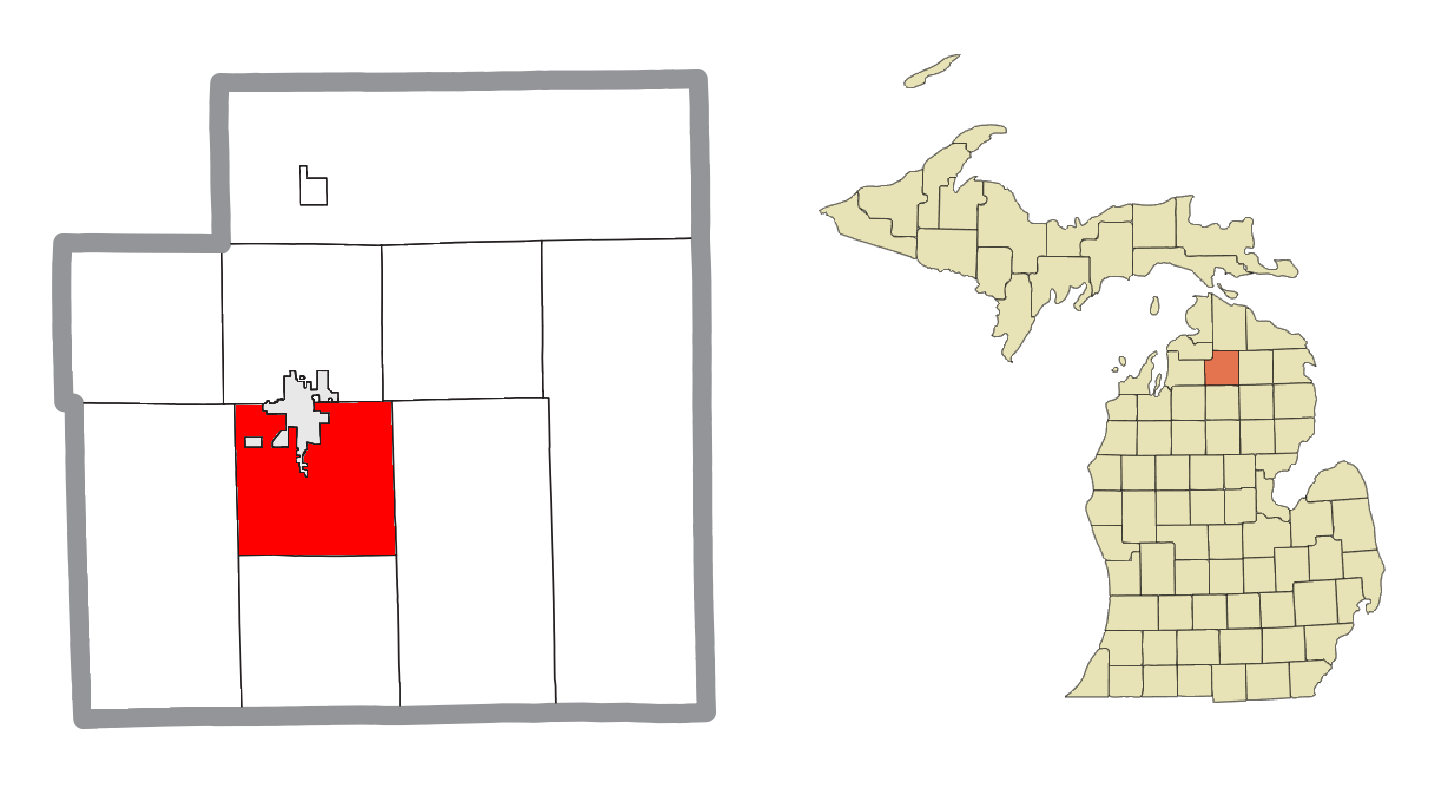
- Location within Otsego County

- Location within the state of Michigan Location within the United States
- Coordinates: 44°58′59″N 84°39′34″W
- Country: United States
- State: Michigan
- County: Otsego
- Established: 1882

Government
  - Supervisor: Michelle Noirot
  - Clerk: James Szymanski

Area
  - Total: 30.68 sq mi (79.46 km^{2})
  - Land: 28.10 sq mi (72.78 km^{2})
  - Water: 2.58 sq mi (6.68 km^{2})
- Elevation: 1,306 ft (398 m)

Population (2020)
  - Total: 5,867
  - Density: 208.8/sq mi (80.61/km^{2})
- Time zone: UTC-5 (Eastern (EST))
  - Summer (DST): UTC-4 (EDT)
- ZIP code(s): 49735 (Gaylord)
- Area code: 989
- FIPS code: 26-04780
- GNIS feature ID: 1625873
- Website: https://bagleytownshipmi.gov/

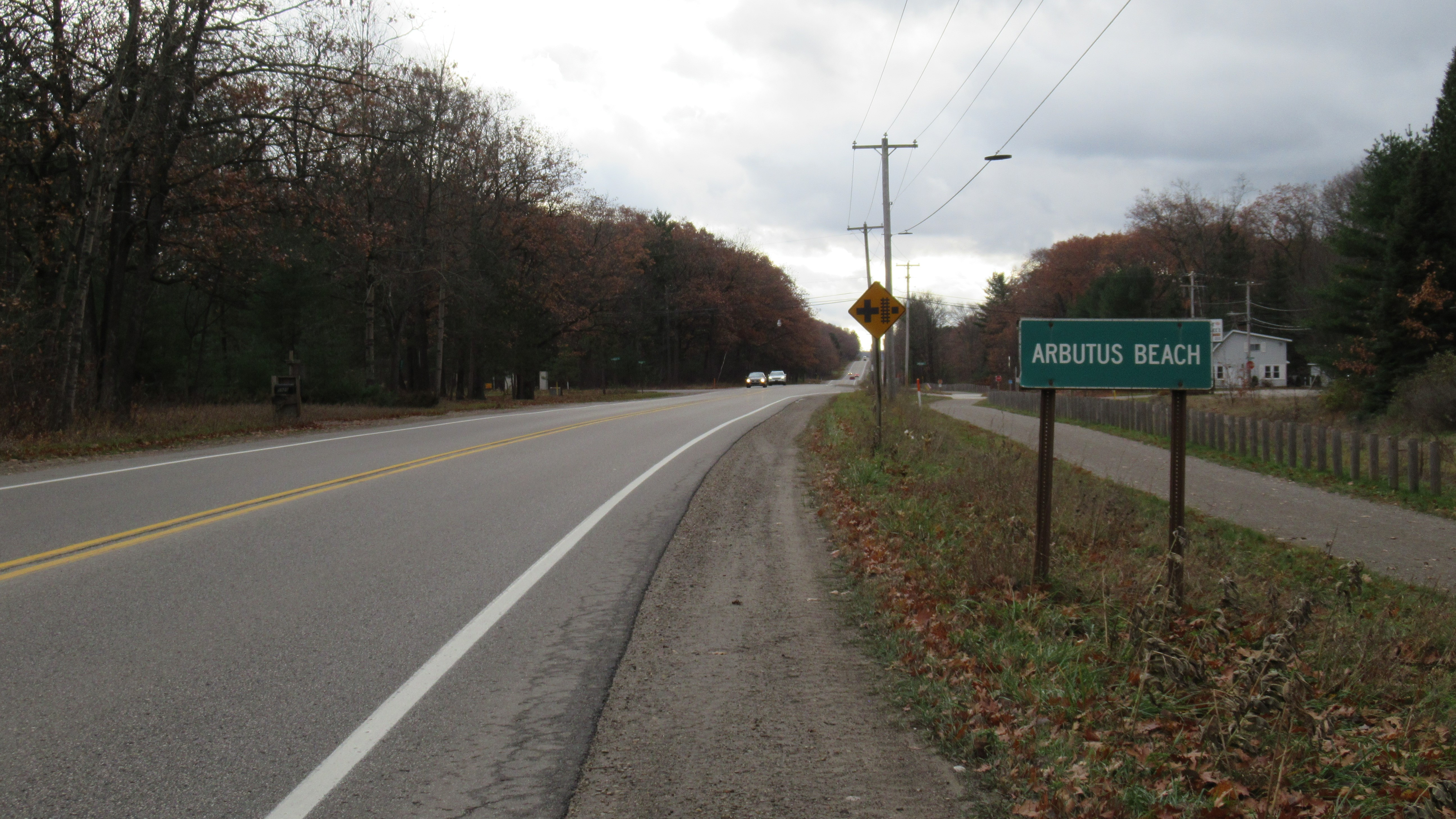
Unincorporated community of Arbutus Beach along Old Highway 27

Bagley Township is a civil township of Otsego County in the U.S. state of Michigan. The population was 5,867 at the 2020 census.

== Communities ==
- Arbutus Beach is an unincorporated community located on the township line with Otsego Lake Township on the eastern shores of Otsego Lake at 44°56′46″N 84°41′00″W. It was settled as a small resort community, and its name comes from both its shoreline on Otsego Lake and the abundant Arbutus in the nearby woods.
- Eyedylwild Beach is an unincorporated community located on the eastern shores of Otsego Lake at 44°57′43″N 84°42′15″W.
- Oak Grove is an unincorporated community located within the township along the northeast coast of Otsego Lake at 44°58′21″N 84°40′57″W. The community was settled by Oris Farrar and named after the numerous oak trees in the area.
- Pearll City is an unincorporated community located within the township at the northern end of Otsego Lake at 44°58′55″N 84°41′01″W.
- Salling or Sallings was a community established as a station on the Michigan Central Railroad in 1887.

== Geography ==
According to the U.S. Census Bureau, the township has a total area of 30.68 square miles (79.46 km^{2}), of which 28.10 square miles (72.78 km^{2}) is land and 2.58 square miles (6.68 km^{2}) (8.41%) is water.

== Demographics ==
As of the census of 2000, there were 5,838 people, 2,189 households, and 1,613 families residing in the township. The population density was 203.9 inhabitants per square mile (78.7/km^{2}). There were 3,019 housing units at an average density of 105.5 per square mile (40.7/km^{2}). The racial makeup of the township was 97.48% White, 0.22% African American, 0.55% Native American, 0.34% Asian, 0.02% Pacific Islander, 0.12% from other races, and 1.27% from two or more races. Hispanic or Latino of any race were 0.77% of the population.

There were 2,189 households, out of which 37.9% had children under the age of 18 living with them, 59.4% were married couples living together, 10.1% had a female householder with no husband present, and 26.3% were non-families. 20.4% of all households were made up of individuals, and 6.6% had someone living alone who was 65 years of age or older. The average household size was 2.66 and the average family size was 3.08.

In the township the population was spread out, with 28.8% under the age of 18, 7.0% from 18 to 24, 30.4% from 25 to 44, 23.1% from 45 to 64, and 10.6% who were 65 years of age or older. The median age was 36 years. For every 100 females, there were 100.3 males. For every 100 females age 18 and over, there were 98.1 males.

The median income for a household in the township was $44,205, and the median income for a family was $50,727. Males had a median income of $36,723 versus $21,388 for females. The per capita income for the township was $21,116. About 5.8% of families and 6.1% of the population were below the poverty line, including 5.9% of those under age 18 and 9.6% of those age 65 or over.
