= Otsego County, Michigan =

County in Michigan, United States

- County
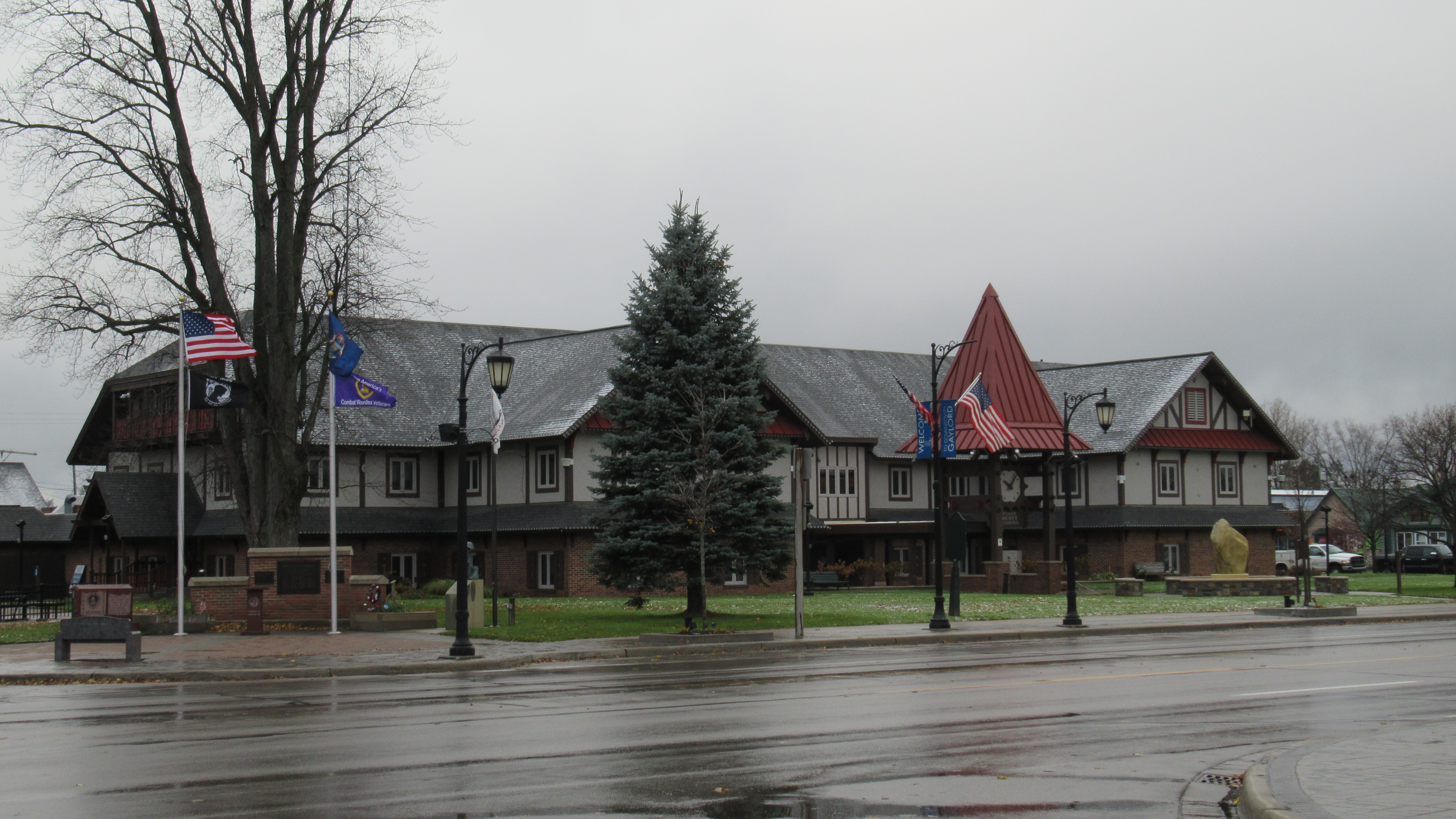
- Otsego County Building in Gaylord

- Seal

- Location within the U.S. state of Michigan
- Coordinates: 45°01′N 84°37′W
- Country: United States
- State: Michigan
- Created: 1840
- Organized: 1875
- Seat: Gaylord
- Largest city: Gaylord

Area
  - Total: 526 sq mi (1,360 km^{2})
  - Land: 514 sq mi (1,330 km^{2})
  - Water: 11 sq mi (28 km^{2}) 2.1%

Population (2020)
  - Total: 25,091
  - Estimate (2025): 26,080 ▲
  - Density: 47/sq mi (18/km^{2})
- Time zone: UTC−5 (Eastern)
  - Summer (DST): UTC−4 (EDT)
- Congressional district: 1st
- Website: otsegocountymi.gov

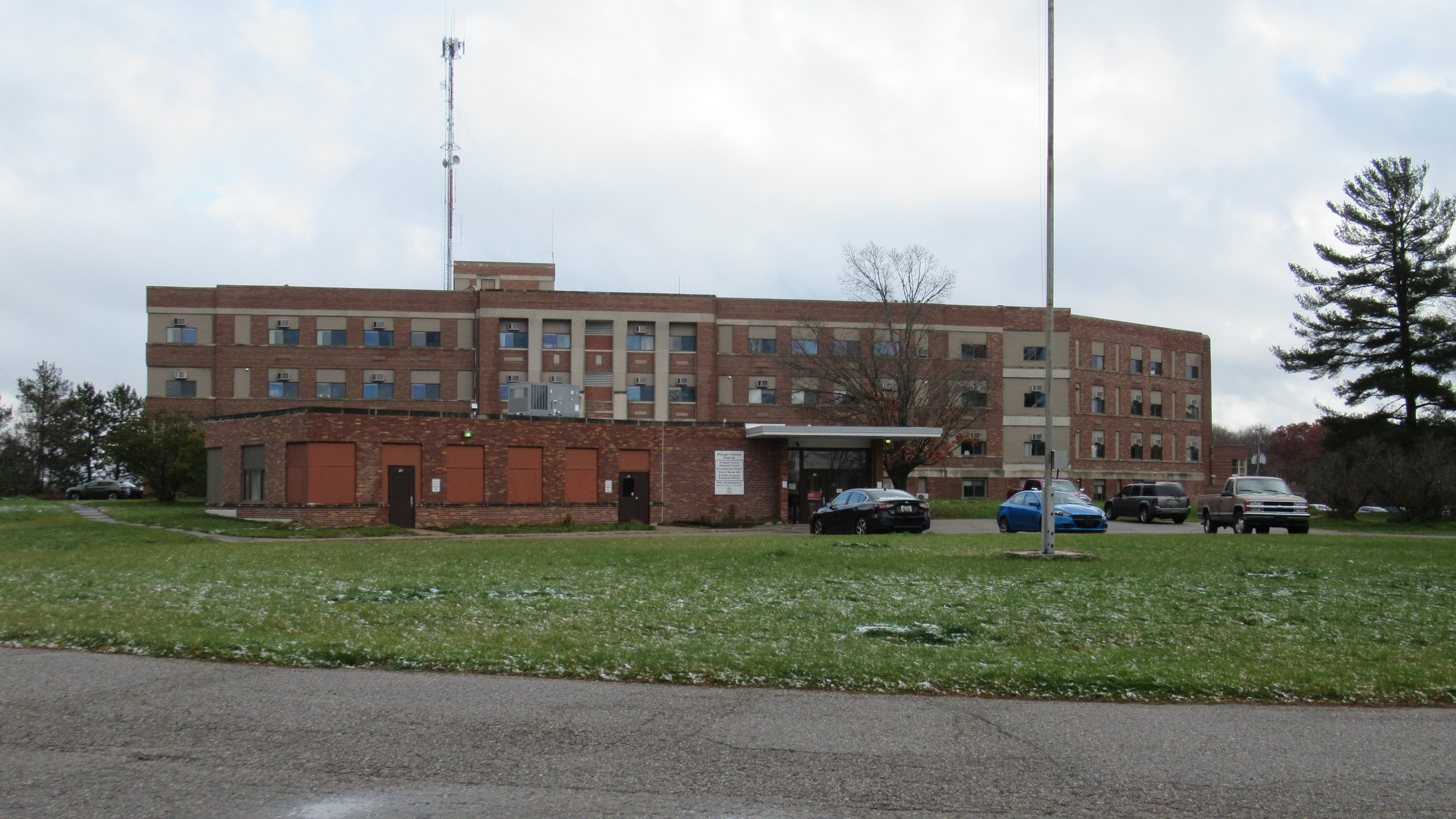
Otsego County District Court in Gaylord

Otsego County (/ɒtˈsiːɡoʊ/ ot-SEE-goh), formerly known as Okkuddo County, is a county located in the U.S. state of Michigan. As of the 2020 census, the population was 25,091. The county seat is Gaylord. The county was founded in 1840 and organized in 1875.

== Etymology ==
Otsego may be a Native American name meaning 'place of the rock'. However, an alternative theory is that it derives from a lake and a county in New York state, which are said to bear the name derived from a Mohawk word meaning either 'clear water' or 'meeting place'. It may be a neologism coined by Henry Schoolcraft, who was a borrower of words and pieces of words from many languages (including Arabic, Greek, Latin, and various American Indian languages). See List of Michigan county name etymologies.

== History ==
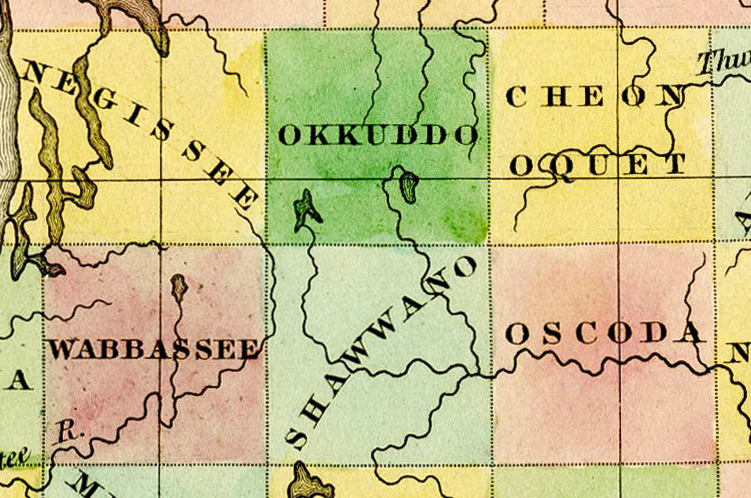
A detail from A New Map of Michigan with its Canals, Roads & Distances (1842) by Henry Schenck Tanner, showing Otsego County as Okkuddo County, its name from 1840 to 1843. Several nearby counties are also shown with names that later changed.

The county was created in 1840 as Okkuddo County (meaning 'sickly water', although the reason for using a name with such a negative meaning is lost). The name was changed to Otsego in 1843, possibly named after the county in New York, with the name ultimately deriving from a Mohawk or Oneida word meaning 'place of the rock'. It was organized in 1875. On May 20, 2022, an EF3 tornado struck the county seat of Gaylord killing two and injuring 44 while causing major damage to the downtown business district and severely damaging a mobile home park.

== Geography ==
According to the United States Census Bureau, the county has a total area of 526 square miles (1,360 km^{2}), of which 515 square miles (1,330 km^{2}) is land and 11 square miles (28 km^{2}) (2.1%) is water. It is the fifth-smallest county by total area in Michigan. Although it is located on Michigan's Lower Peninsula, Otsego County is considered to be part of Northern Michigan.

Otsego County has more than 370 lakes, mostly in the southern part of the county. Otsego Lake is the county's largest and has a surface area of 1,972 acres (7.98 km^{2}). Other large lakes in the southern part of the county include Big Lake, Big Bear Lake, Buhl Lake, Crapo Lake, Dixon Lake, Douglas Lake, Guthrie Lake, Heart Lake, Lake Tecon, Manuka Lake, Opal Lake, Pencil Lake, and Turtle Lake. The larger lakes in the northern part of the county are Five Lakes, Hardwood Lake, Lake Twenty Seven, and Pickerel Lake. Many of these are so-called 'kettle lakes,' formed by the melting of blocks of glacial ice, left as the glacier retreated, which created a depression in the soil.

Glaciers shaped the area, creating a unique regional ecosystem. A large portion of the area is the Grayling outwash plain, a broad outwash plain including sandy ice-disintegration ridges; jack pine barrens, some white pine-red pine forest, and northern hardwood forest. Large lakes were created by glacial action.

Headwaters of the Au Sable, Black, Manistee, Pigeon, and Sturgeon Rivers are in Otsego County. The Au Sable River watershed is the county's largest watershed.

=== Adjacent counties ===
- Cheboygan County – north
- Montmorency County – east
- Oscoda County – southeast
- Crawford County – south
- Kalkaska County – southwest
- Antrim County – west
- Charlevoix County – northwest

== Demographics ==
Historical population
Census	Pop.	Note	%±
1880	1,974		—
1890	4,272		116.4%
1900	6,175		44.5%
1910	6,552		6.1%
1920	6,043		−7.8%
1930	5,554		−8.1%
1940	5,827		4.9%
1950	6,435		10.4%
1960	7,545		17.2%
1970	10,422		38.1%
1980	14,993		43.9%
1990	17,957		19.8%
2000	23,301		29.8%
2010	24,164		3.7%
2020	25,091		3.8%
2025 (est.)	26,080	▲	3.9%
US Decennial Census; 1790-1960 1900-1990; 1990-2000 2010-2018

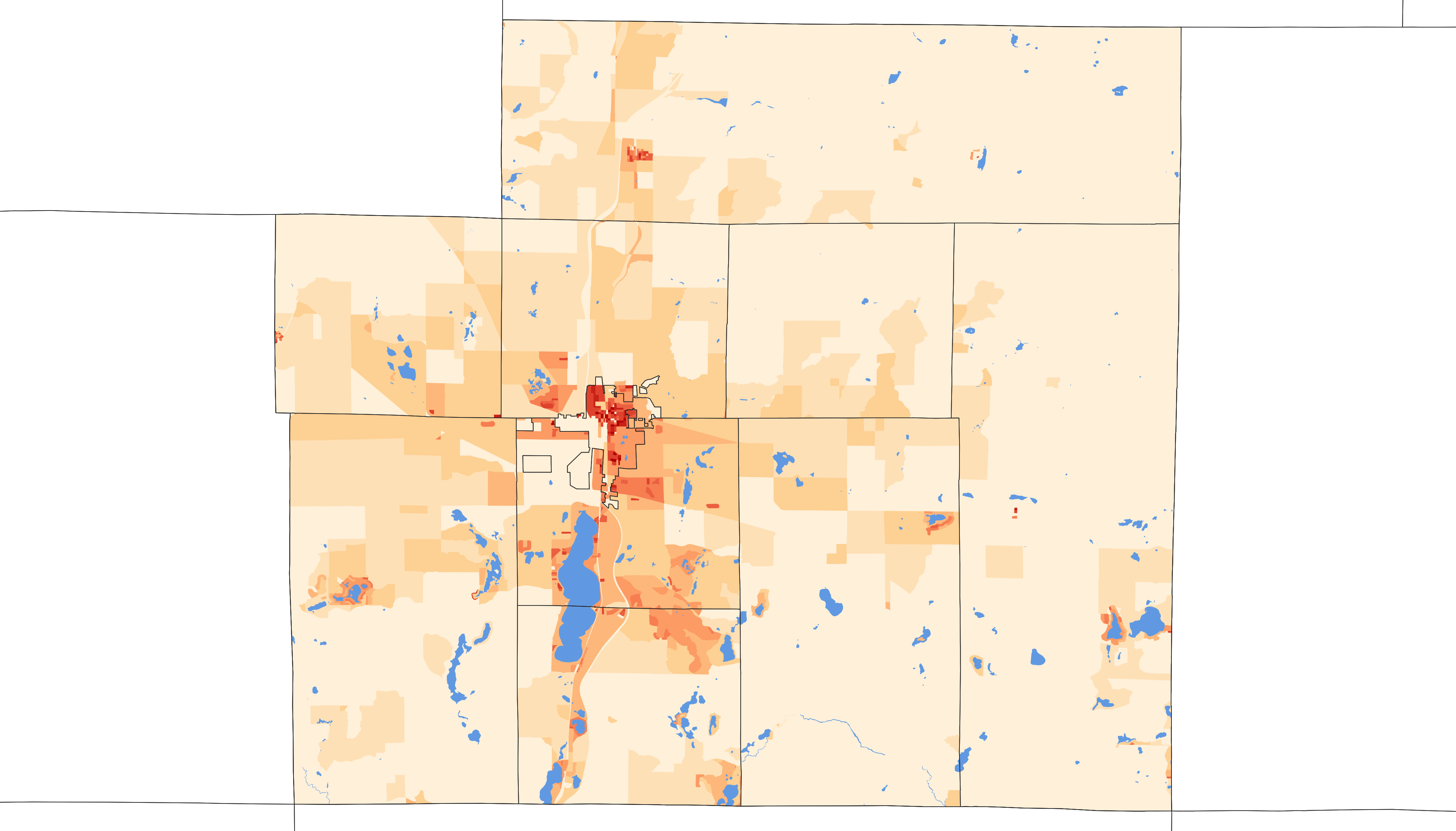
2020 population density of Otsego County MI by census block

=== Racial and ethnic composition ===
Otsego County, Michigan – Racial and ethnic composition Note: the US Census treats Hispanic/Latino as an ethnic category. This table excludes Latinos from the racial categories and assigns them to a separate category. Hispanics/Latinos may be of any race.
Race / Ethnicity (NH = Non-Hispanic)	Pop 1980	Pop 1990	Pop 2000	Pop 2010	Pop 2020	% 1980	% 1990	% 2000	% 2010	% 2020
White alone (NH)	14,848	17,682	22,603	23,186	23,156	99.03%	98.47%	97.00%	95.95%	92.29%
Black or African American alone (NH)	6	18	42	78	100	0.04%	0.10%	0.18%	0.32%	0.40%
Native American or Alaska Native alone (NH)	29	103	136	151	151	0.19%	0.57%	0.58%	0.62%	0.60%
Asian alone (NH)	56	82	79	92	91	0.37%	0.46%	0.34%	0.38%	0.36%
Native Hawaiian or Pacific Islander alone (NH)	x	x	9	11	0	x	x	0.04%	0.05%	0.00%
Other race alone (NH)	5	5	5	3	60	0.03%	0.03%	0.02%	0.01%	0.24%
Mixed race or Multiracial (NH)	x	x	252	344	1,087	x	x	1.08%	1.42%	4.33%
Hispanic or Latino (any race)	49	67	175	299	446	0.33%	0.37%	0.75%	1.24%	1.78%
Total	14,993	17,957	23,301	24,164	25,091	100.00%	100.00%	100.00%	100.00%	100.00%

=== 2020 census ===
As of the 2020 census, the county had a population of 25,091. The median age was 45.3 years. 20.7% of residents were under the age of 18 and 21.9% of residents were 65 years of age or older. For every 100 females there were 100.1 males, and for every 100 females age 18 and over there were 98.3 males age 18 and over.

The racial makeup of the county was 92.9% White, 0.4% Black or African American, 0.7% American Indian and Alaska Native, 0.4% Asian, <0.1% Native Hawaiian and Pacific Islander, 0.5% from some other race, and 5.1% from two or more races. Hispanic or Latino residents of any race comprised 1.8% of the population.

33.8% of residents lived in urban areas, while 66.2% lived in rural areas.

There were 10,407 households in the county, of which 26.3% had children under the age of 18 living in them. Of all households, 50.3% were married-couple households, 18.4% were households with a male householder and no spouse or partner present, and 23.1% were households with a female householder and no spouse or partner present. About 27.8% of all households were made up of individuals and 13.3% had someone living alone who was 65 years of age or older.

There were 14,861 housing units, of which 30.0% were vacant. Among occupied housing units, 76.7% were owner-occupied and 23.3% were renter-occupied. The homeowner vacancy rate was 1.7% and the rental vacancy rate was 5.6%.

=== 2000 census ===
As of the 2000 United States census, there were 23,301 people, 8,995 households, and 6,539 families residing in the county. The population density was 45 people per square mile (17 people/km^{2}). There were 13,375 housing units at an average density of 26 per square mile (10/km^{2}).

In 2000, the racial makeup of the county was 97.51% White, 0.18% Black or African American, 0.62% Native American, 0.34% Asian, 0.04% Pacific Islander, 0.15% from other races, and 1.16% from two or more races. 0.75% of the population were Hispanic or Latino of any race. 22.1% were of German, 17.6% Polish, 10.5% Irish, 9.9% English and 9.4% American ancestry. 96.8% spoke English and 1.3% Polish as their first language.

There were 8,995 households, out of which 34.10% had children under the age of 18 living with them, 60.40% were married couples living together, 8.30% had a female householder with no husband present, and 27.30% were non-families. 22.50% of all households were made up of individuals, and 9.10% had someone living alone who was 65 years of age or older. The average household size was 2.56 and the average family size was 3.00.

The county population contained 26.80% under the age of 18, 7.00% from 18 to 24, 28.50% from 25 to 44, 24.00% from 45 to 64, and 13.70% who were 65 years of age or older. The median age was 38 years. For every 100 females there were 98.60 males. For every 100 females age 18 and over, there were 96.70 males.

In 2000, the median income for a household in the county was $40,876, and the median income for a family was $46,628. Males had a median income of $34,413 versus $21,204 for females. The per capita income for the county was $19,810. About 5.30% of families and 6.80% of the population were below the poverty line, including 7.50% of those under age 18 and 7.10% of those age 65 or over.

== Government ==
Otsego County voters have been reliably Republican from the start. They have selected the Republican Party nominee in 89% of national elections (32 of 36) since 1884.

=== Political culture ===
United States presidential election results for Otsego County, Michigan
Year	Republican		Democratic		Third party(ies)	
Year	No.	%	No.	%	No.	%
1884	485	52.95%	410	44.76%	21	2.29%
1888	573	52.81%	434	40.00%	78	7.19%
1892	525	47.60%	531	48.14%	47	4.26%
1896	859	59.41%	560	38.73%	27	1.87%
1900	1,020	67.95%	436	29.05%	45	3.00%
1904	1,239	78.82%	266	16.92%	67	4.26%
1908	864	72.48%	276	23.15%	52	4.36%
1912	448	42.79%	194	18.53%	405	38.68%
1916	531	49.17%	519	48.06%	30	2.78%
1920	874	64.03%	466	34.14%	25	1.83%
1924	1,144	73.81%	249	16.06%	157	10.13%
1928	1,049	68.52%	476	31.09%	6	0.39%
1932	1,006	40.35%	1,377	55.23%	110	4.41%
1936	1,102	45.03%	1,280	52.31%	65	2.66%
1940	1,353	54.56%	1,119	45.12%	8	0.32%
1944	1,259	57.70%	912	41.80%	11	0.50%
1948	1,392	60.00%	888	38.28%	40	1.72%
1952	1,941	68.88%	865	30.70%	12	0.43%
1956	1,930	63.74%	1,095	36.16%	3	0.10%
1960	1,944	56.04%	1,521	43.85%	4	0.12%
1964	1,214	35.07%	2,245	64.85%	3	0.09%
1968	1,871	49.33%	1,661	43.79%	261	6.88%
1972	2,854	58.93%	1,912	39.48%	77	1.59%
1976	3,155	53.01%	2,724	45.77%	73	1.23%
1980	3,771	53.70%	2,666	37.96%	586	8.34%
1984	4,639	68.27%	2,117	31.16%	39	0.57%
1988	4,620	63.31%	2,635	36.11%	43	0.59%
1992	3,393	36.85%	3,129	33.99%	2,685	29.16%
1996	3,638	43.73%	3,351	40.28%	1,331	16.00%
2000	6,108	58.14%	4,034	38.40%	363	3.46%
2004	7,470	60.70%	4,674	37.98%	163	1.32%
2008	6,752	53.39%	5,634	44.55%	261	2.06%
2012	7,011	58.96%	4,681	39.37%	199	1.67%
2016	8,266	65.55%	3,556	28.20%	788	6.25%
2020	9,779	66.19%	4,743	32.10%	253	1.71%
2024	10,693	66.95%	5,052	31.63%	226	1.42%

United States Senate election results for Otsego County, Michigan1
Year	Republican		Democratic		Third party(ies)	
Year	No.	%	No.	%	No.	%
2024	10,323	65.59%	4,978	31.63%	438	2.78%

Michigan Gubernatorial election results for Otsego County
Year	Republican		Democratic		Third party(ies)	
Year	No.	%	No.	%	No.	%
2022	7,422	59.35%	4,818	38.53%	265	2.12%

The county government operates the jail, maintains rural roads, operates the major local courts, records deeds, mortgages, and vital records, administers public health regulations, and participates with the state in the provision of social services. The county board of commissioners controls the budget and has limited authority to make laws or ordinances. In Michigan, most local government functions – police and fire, building and zoning, tax assessment, street maintenance, etc. – are the responsibility of individual cities and townships.

=== Elected officials ===
- Prosecuting Attorney: Michael A. Rola
- Sheriff: Matthew Nowicki
- County Clerk/Register of Deeds: Susan I. DeFeyter
- County Treasurer: Paula Wright
- County Surveyor: Ronald C. Brand

(information as of September 2005)

== Media ==
The Gaylord Herald Times is the newspaper of record for Otsego County. It is published twice weekly, and is the oldest surviving business. It was founded in 1875, the year that the county was organized.

== Communities ==
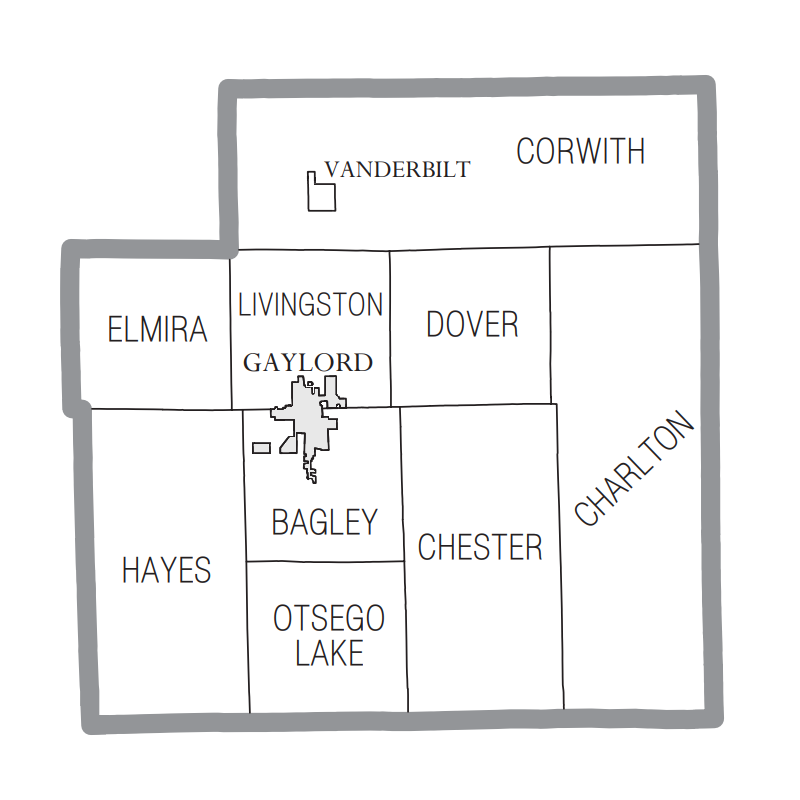
U.S. Census data map showing local municipal boundaries within Otsego County. Shaded areas represent incorporated cities.

=== City ===
- Gaylord (county seat)

=== Village ===
- Vanderbilt

=== Civil townships ===
- Bagley Township
- Charlton Township
- Chester Township
- Corwith Township
- Dover Township
- Elmira Township
- Hayes Township
- Livingston Township
- Otsego Lake Township

=== Unincorporated communities ===
- Arbutus Beach
- Elmira (partial)
- Eyedylwild Beach
- Farrar Landing
- Green Timbers
- Hetherton (partial)
- Johannesburg
- Lower Chub Landing
- Oak Grove
- Otsego Lake
- Pearll City
- Sparr
- Vienna Corners (partial)
- Waters
- Whites Landing

== Transportation ==
=== State-maintained highways ===
- I-75 is a north–south freeway the runs through central Otsego County, bypassing Gaylord to the west. The route serves as Michigan's major north–south thoroughfare, cities such as Detroit, Flint, and Saginaw with Northern Michigan and the Upper Peninsula.
  - BL I-75 is a loop route serving businesses and tourists in the city of Gaylord. It shares a short concurrency with M-32.
- M-32 is an east–west route, running across much of the width of the northern Lower Peninsula. Including Gaylord, the highway serves communities such as East Jordan, Elmira, Johannesburg, Atlanta, Hillman, and Alpena.
- US 27 is a former highway that was removed from Otsego County in 1961. The route has since been supplanted by I-75, and is today referred to as "Old 27".

=== County-designated highways ===
- C-38 is an east–west route that connects the community of Otsego Lake to US Highway 131 (US 131) at Mancelona.
- C-42 is an east–west route serving as a cutoff between M-32 near Gaylord and US 131 at Alba.
- C-48 is an east–west route in northwest Otsego County, connecting Boyne Falls and eastern Charlevoix County to Old US 27 and Vanderbilt.
- F-01 is a north–south route running along the Otsego–Montmorency county line.
- F-38 is an east–west route serving southeastern Otsego County and the Montmorency County community of Lewiston.
- F-42 serves as a southern bypass of Gaylord, running parallel to M-32.
- F-44 parallels M-32 to the north, east of Gaylord.
- F-97 is a north–south route that serves southern Otsego County, and extends south into Crawford, Roscommon, and Gladwin counties.

=== Airport ===
Gaylord Regional Airport – on SW edge of Gaylord, owned and operated by Otsego County, is a General Utility Airport. It is listed as a tier one airport in all categories of the Michigan Airport System Plan.

== See also ==
- List of Michigan State Historic Sites in Otsego County, Michigan
- National Register of Historic Places listings in Otsego County, Michigan
