= Michigan's 37th Senate district =

American legislative district

Michigan's 37th State Senate district
Senator
John Damoose; R–Harbor Springs
- Demographics: 88% White; 0.8% Black; 2.7% Hispanic; 0.6% Asian; 2.6% Native American; 0.4% Other; 5% Multiracial
- Population (2024): 262,682

Michigan's 37th Senate district is one of 38 districts in the Michigan Senate. The 37th district was created with the adoption of the 1963 Michigan Constitution, as the previous 1908 state constitution only permitted 34 senatorial districts. It has been represented by Republican John Damoose since 2023, succeeding fellow Republican Wayne Schmidt.

== Geography ==
District 38 encompasses the entirety of Antrim, Charlevoix, Cheboygan, Emmet, Grand Traverse, Leelanau, and Presque Isle counties as well as parts of Chippewa and Mackinac counties.

=== 2011 Apportionment Plan ===
District 37, as dictated by the 2011 Apportionment Plan, covered the northernmost parts of the Lower Peninsula and the eastern end of the Upper Peninsula, including all of Antrim, Charlevoix, Cheboygan, Chippewa, Emmet, Grand Traverse, Luce, and Mackinac Counties. Communities in the district included Traverse City, Sault Ste. Marie, Petoskey, Cheboygan, Boyne City, St. Ignace, Kingsley, Elk Rapids, Charlevoix, East Jordan, Newberry, Garfield Township, East Bay Township, Blair Township, and Long Lake Township.

The district was located entirely within Michigan's 1st congressional district, and overlapped with the 104th, 105th, 106th, 107th, and 109th districts of the Michigan House of Representatives. The district bordered Canada, as well as three Great Lakes: Huron, Michigan, and Superior.

== List of senators ==
Senator	Party	Dates	Residence	Notes
Thomas F. Schweigert	Republican	1965–1970	Petoskey	
Robert William Davis	Republican	1971–1978	Gaylord	
Mitch Irwin	Democratic	1979–1990	Sault Ste. Marie	
George A. McManus Jr.	Republican	1991–1994	Traverse City	
Walter H. North	Republican	1995–2002	St. Ignace	
Jason Allen	Republican	2003–2010	Traverse City	
Howard Walker	Republican	2011–2014	Traverse City	
Wayne Schmidt	Republican	2015–2022	Traverse City	
John Damoose	Republican	2023–present	Harbor Springs	

== Recent election results ==
=== 2020s ===
2026 Michigan Senate election
Primary election
Party	Candidate	Votes	%
General election
Republican	John Damoose (incumbent)	80,139	54.45
Democratic	Kate Gallup	67,027	45.55
Total votes		147,166	100
Republican hold			

2022 Michigan Senate election, District 37
Primary election
Party	Candidate	Votes	%
Republican	John Damoose	18,286	41.0
Republican	Triston Cole	13,520	30.3
Republican	George Ranville	7,596	17.0
Republican	William Hindle	5,245	11.8
Total votes		44,647	100
Democratic	Barbara Conley	25,466	86.4
Democratic	Jim Schmidt	2,304	7.8
Democratic	Randy Bishop	1,702	5.8
Total votes		29,472	100
General election
Republican	John Damoose	79,125	55.5
Democratic	Barbara Conley	61,069	42.8
Libertarian	Zachary Dean	2,468	1.7
Total votes		142,662	100
Republican hold			

=== 2018 ===
2018 Michigan Senate election, District 37
Primary election
Party	Candidate	Votes	%
Republican	Wayne Schmidt (incumbent)	27,693	80.0
Republican	Jim Gurr	6,924	20.0
Total votes		34,617	100
General election
Republican	Wayne Schmidt (incumbent)	73,338	58.9
Democratic	Jim Page	51,076	41.1
Total votes		124,414	100
Republican hold			

=== 2014 ===
2014 Michigan Senate election, District 37
Primary election
Party	Candidate	Votes	%
Republican	Wayne Schmidt	19,107	55.5
Republican	Greg MacMaster	15,312	44.5
Total votes		34,419	100
Democratic	Phil Bellfy	4,620	51.5
Democratic	Jimmy Schmidt	4,346	48.5
Total votes		8,966	100
General election
Republican	Wayne Schmidt	54,981	61.1
Democratic	Phil Bellfy	35,037	38.9
Total votes		90,018	100
Republican hold			

=== Federal and statewide results ===
Year	Office	Results
2020	President	Trump 56.3 – 42.0%
2018	Senate	James 54.9 – 42.9%
2018	Governor	Schuette 53.1 – 43.8%
2016	President	Trump 57.7 – 36.7%
2014	Senate	Land 51.0 – 45.0%
2014	Governor	Snyder 57.7 – 39.5%
2012	President	Romney 56.2 – 42.7%
2012	Senate	Stabenow 48.5 – 48.1%

== Historical district boundaries ==
Map	Description	Apportionment Plan	Notes
	Alger County (part); Burt Township; Grand Island Township; Munising; Munising Township; Alpena County; Antrim County (part); Banks Township; Central Lake Township; Chestonia Township; Echo Township; Forest Home Township; Jordan Township; Kearney Township; Mancelona Township; Star Township; Torch Lake Township; Warner Township; Charlevoix County; Cheboygan County; Chippewa County; Delta County; Emmet County; Luce County; Mackinac County; Montmorency County; Otsego County; Presque Isle County; Schoolcraft County	1964 Apportionment Plan	
	Alcona County; Alger County (part); Au Train Township (part); Limestone Township; Mathias Township; Munising Township (part); Alpena County; Antrim County (part); Excluding; Custer Township; Charlevoix County; Cheboygan County; Chippewa County; Crawford County; Delta County (part); Baldwin Township; Bay de Noc Township; Brampton Township; Cornell Township; Ensign Township; Escanaba Township (part); Fairbanks Township; Garden Township; Maple Ridge Township; Masonville Township; Nahma Township; Emmet County; Iosco County (part); Alabaster Township; Au Sable Township; Baldwin Township; East Tawas; Grant Township; Oscoda Township; Sherman Township; Tawas City; Tawas Township; Wilber Township; Kalkaska County (part); Bear Lake Township; Garfield Township; Luce County; Mackinac County; Montmorency County; Oscoda County; Otsego County; Presque Isle County; Schoolcraft County (part); Excluding; Seney Township	1972 Apportionment Plan	
	Antrim County; Charlevoix County; Cheboygan County; Chippewa County; Delta County; Emmet County; Grand Traverse County; Luce County; Mackinac County; Otsego County; Schoolcraft County	1982 Apportionment Plan	
	Alcona County; Alger County; Alpena County; Charlevoix County; Cheboygan County; Chippewa County; Emmet County; Iosco County; Luce County; Mackinac County; Montmorency County; Oscoda County; Presque Isle County; Schoolcraft County	1992 Apportionment Plan	
	Antrim County; Charlevoix County; Cheboygan County; Chippewa County; Emmet County; Grand Traverse County; Mackinac County; Presque Isle County	2001 Apportionment Plan	
	Antrim County; Charlevoix County; Cheboygan County; Chippewa County; Emmet County; Grand Traverse County; Luce County; Mackinac County	2011 Apportionment Plan	
