= Elk River Chain of Lakes Watershed =

Drainage basin in Michigan, United States

The Elk River Chain of Lakes Watershed, commonly known as the Chain of Lakes, is a 75-mile-long (121 km) waterway consisting of numerous lakes and connecting rivers in the northwestern Lower Peninsula of the U.S. state of Michigan. The watershed empties via the Elk River in Elk Rapids into the East Arm of Grand Traverse Bay, a bay of Lake Michigan.

The watershed includes 500 square miles (1,300 km^{2}) in Antrim, Charlevoix, Grand Traverse, and Kalkaska counties. The watershed includes a series of 14 lakes and interconnecting rivers. From the uppermost lake in the chain, Beals Lake in Echo Township, Antrim County, the water flows 55 miles (89 km) and drops 40 feet (12 m) in elevation. It has over 200 miles (320 km) of shoreline and almost 60 square miles (160 km^{2}) of water surface area.

== Geography ==
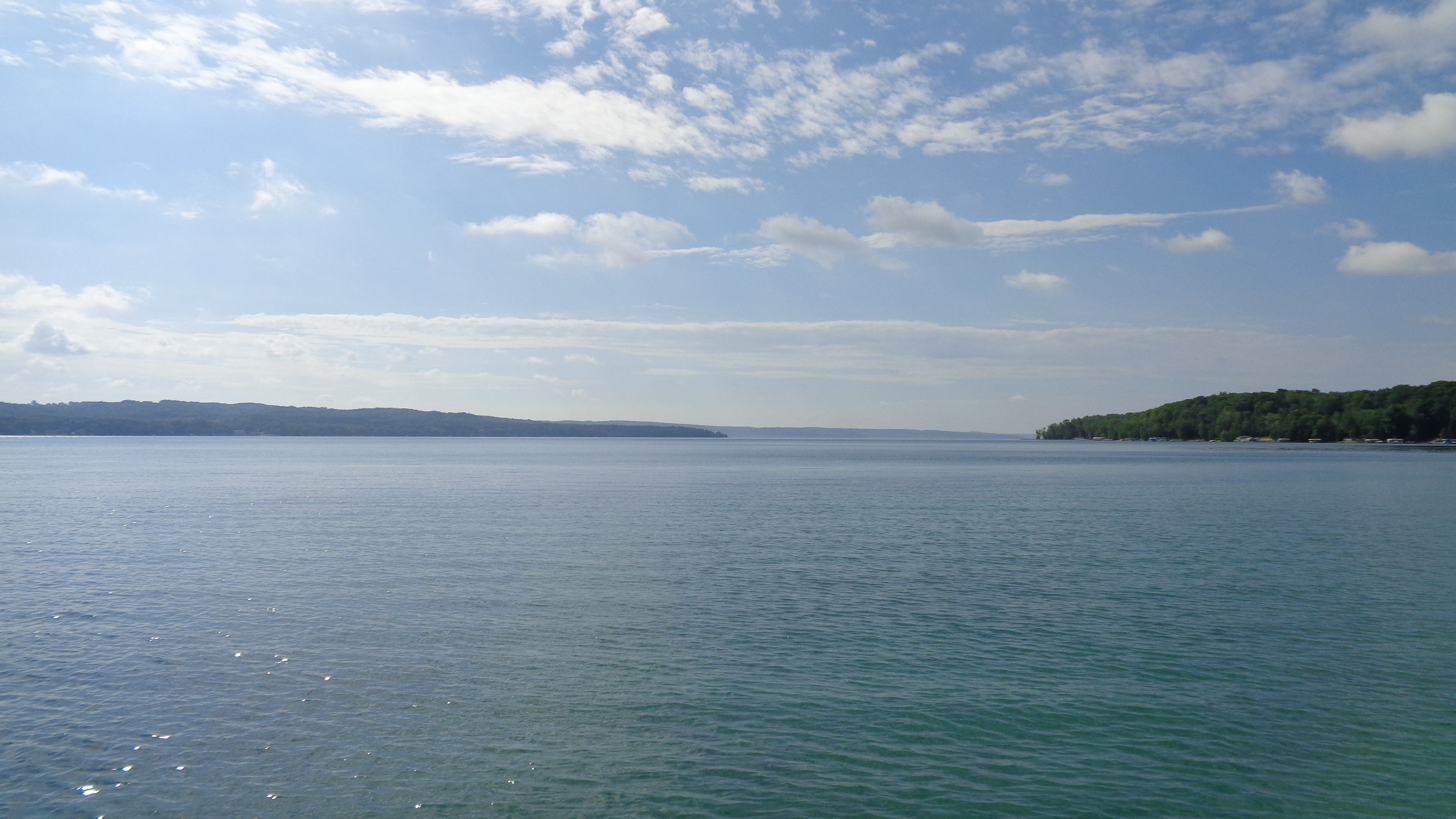
Torch Lake is the second-largest and deepest inland lake in Michigan.

The chain of lakes system begins with the upper stage of the Intermediate River, which rises in hill country at 45°00′20″N 85°04′45″W in the northwest corner of Chestonia Township in central Antrim County. From here, the waterway traverses a number of small lakes flowing north, then making a sharp turn near the village of Ellsworth, flows south through a narrow valley, paralleling the tracks of the Pere Marquette Railroad, until emptying into Intermediate Lake. The outlet of Intermediate Lake converges with the Cedar River in the village of Bellaire, gaining considerable volume. Now a river of substantial flow, it continues south into 1,700-acre (6.9 km^{2}) Lake Bellaire. Leaving the lake, the stream becomes the Grass River, winding for some two miles (3.2 km) through the scenic Grass River Natural Area before emptying into Clam Lake. Clam Lake in turn empties directly into Torch Lake. At over 18,000 acres (73 km^{2}) in size, Torch Lake is the largest body of water in the system. The waterway, now clarified after traversing the immense depths of the lake, continues south through the Torch River, joins with the Rapid River, a major tributary, and empties into Lake Skegemog, a 2,500-acre (10 km^{2}) lake that is studded with large stump fields, the result of the flooding of timberlands when the lake level was raised several feet by the construction of the dam at the terminus of the system. Lake Skegemog, which is the meeting point of Grand Traverse, Kalkaska and Antrim counties, is conjoined at its western end to 7,700-acre (31 km^{2}) Elk Lake, the second-largest and final lake in the system. The outflow of Elk Lake, the Elk River, flows a short distance to a power dam in the town of Elk Rapids, then out into the east arm of the Grand Traverse Bay of Lake Michigan at 44°54′06″N 85°24′49″W. For most of its length, the chain is navigable by small boat, broken up only by a dam in Bellaire. Larger boats are able to navigate between Elk Rapids and Torch Lake.

== History ==
Various tribes of primarily Ojibwa Native Americans inhabited the region when the first white settlers began to arrive in the middle of the 19th century to attempt farming. The thin soils and short, cool summers made traditional farming difficult, and the region remained sparsely settled until the 1880s, when lumber interests began exploiting the region's vast tracts of white pine forests. The waterway provided an excellent means of transporting logs down to sawmills located along the way. The arrival of the railroads in the 1890s accelerated lumbering and other economic activities, and brought in visitors from distant places, who marveled at the natural beauty of lakes and rivers of the chain, turning it into a major destination for vacationers from downstate and elsewhere. Scores of resorts cropped up on the shorelines of all the major lakes of the system, catering to fisherman and wild-life enthusiasts. By 1910, the lumber era had all but passed, and many once prosperous towns and villages in the area went into decline. Many of the region's farmers, having failed to get decent yields of traditional crops, either moved on, or turned to cultivation of fruit crops, most notably cherries, as the area's sandy soil and cool lake climate were found to be favorable for growing such produce. Fruit farming and tourism became, and remain, the leading economic activities of the region. The chain is also a recreational hub, including boating and the Chain of Lakes Water Trail, hosted by Paddle Antrim.

== Rivers and lakes in the watershed ==
The 14 lakes (numbered) and connecting waterways in the chain of lakes are highlighted in bold. Other tributaries are in normal text

- **Elk River**
  - 1) **Elk Lake**
    - Williamsburg Creek
      - Bissell Pond
        - Bissell Creek
    - Battle Creek
    - 2) **Lake Skegemog**
      - Barker Creek
      - Desmond Creek
      - **Torch River**
        - Rapid River
          - Rugg Pond (also known as Antrim Pond)
            - Little Rapid River
        - 3) **Torch Lake**
          - Spencer Creek
          - Eastport Creek
          - Wilkinson Creek (also Wilkenson Creek)
          - 4) **Clam Lake**
            - Finch Creek
              - Crow Creek
            - **Grass River**
              - Cold Creek
              - Shanty Creek
              - 5) **Lake Bellaire**
                - Grass Creek
                - **Intermediate River**
                  - Cedar River
                    - Blair Lake
                    - North Branch Cedar River
                    - Woolcott Creek
                  - 6) **Intermediate Lake**
                    - Openo Creek
                    - Fisk Creek
                    - 7) **Hanley Lake**
                      - **Green River**
                        - Ogletree Creek
                          - Kitty Ann Creek
                          - Toad Lake
                            - Toad Creek
                              - Mud Lake
                                - Little Torch Lake
                        - 8) **Ben-way Lake**
                          - Benway Creek
                          - 9) **Wilson Lake**
                            - Vonstraten Creek
                              - King Creek
                              - Eaton Lake
                            - 10) **Ellsworth Lake**
                              - Skinner Creek
                                - Skinner Lake
                                - Marion Creek
                              - 11) St. Clair Lake
                                - St. Clair Creek
                                  - Lyman Creek
                                    - Lymans Lake (also Lyman Lake)
                                - 12) Sixmile Lake
                                  - Liscon Creek
                                    - Ranney Creek
                                  - Vance Creek
                                  - **Dingman River**
                                    - Smith Creek
                                    - 13) Scotts Lake
                                      - Beal Creek
                                      - 14) Beals Lake
                                        - **Intermediate River**
                                          - Spence Creek
                                          - Taylor Creek
                                          - Seamon Creek
                                          - Hitchcock Creek

== Cities, villages, and townships in the watershed ==
The Elk River Chain of Lakes Watershed includes all or portions of the following cities, villages, and townships:

- Antrim County
  - Banks Township
  - Bellaire
  - Central Lake
  - Central Lake Township
  - Chestonia Township
  - Custer Township
  - Echo Township
  - Ellsworth
  - Elk Rapids
  - Forest Home Township
  - Helena Township
  - Kearney Township
  - Mancelona Township
  - Milton Township
  - Star Township
  - Torch Lake Township
  - Warner Township
- Charlevoix County
  - Marion Township
  - Norwood Township
  - South Arm Township
- Grand Traverse County
  - Whitewater Township
- Kalkaska County
  - Clearwater Township
  - Cold Springs Township
  - Kalkaska
  - Kalkaska Township
  - Rapid River Township
- Otsego County
  - Elmira Township

== See also ==
- Inland Waterway (Michigan)
- List of lakes in Michigan
