= Jordan River (Michigan) =

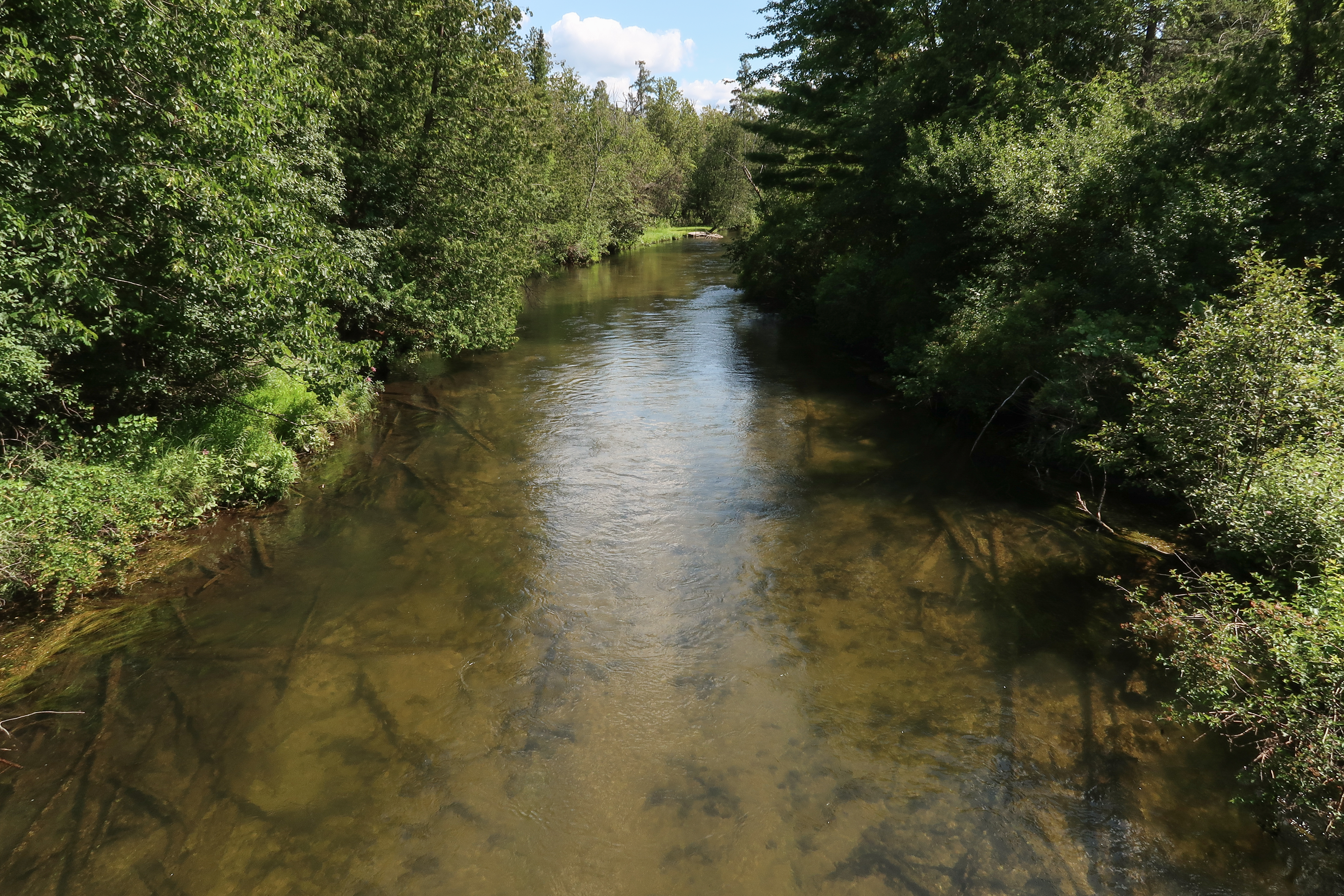
- The Jordan River in Jordan Township

- Location of the mouth of the Jordan River in Michigan

Location
- Country: United States
- State: Michigan
- Counties: Antrim, Charlevoix

Physical characteristics
- Source
  - location: Warner Township
  - coordinates: 45°04′28″N 84°54′28″W
  - elevation: 1,190 feet (360 m)
- Mouth: Lake Charlevoix
  - location: East Jordan
  - coordinates: 45°09′13″N 85°07′48″W
  - elevation: 590 feet (180 m)
- Length: 24.9 miles (40.1 km)
- Basin size: 100,000 acres (400 km^{2})

Basin features
- Tributaries
  - left: Green River
  - right: Deer Creek

The Jordan River is a 24.9-mile-long (40.1 km) stream in the northwestern part of the Lower Peninsula in the U.S. state of Michigan. It is the largest tributary of Lake Charlevoix. The Jordan's headwaters rise from springs in the upper Jordan River Valley northeast of Mancelona in Antrim County. The Jordan River was the first river to be designated in Michigan's Natural Rivers Program.

The Jordan River is well known for its world-class brook trout fishing and for its scenic canoe trips. The headwaters are accessible by many foot and ATV trails.

== Course ==
The Jordan River begins in central Warner Township in northeast Antrim County. It winds generally to the southwest, cutting across the northwest corner of Star Township before flowing west through northern Chestonia Township. It then turns to the north, flowing through Jordan Township, the northeast corner of Echo Township, then into South Arm Township in Charlevoix County and emptying into the south arm of Lake Charlevoix in East Jordan.

== Tributaries ==
- (right) Jones Creek
- (left) Deer Creek
  - Patricia Lake
  - (left) Healeys Trout Pond
  - (right) Marvon Creek
  - (right) Eaton Creek
  - (right) Warner Creek
    - (left) Hog Creek
    - O'Brien Pond
  - (right) Collins Creek
  - Deer Lake
- (right) Bennett Creek
  - Mud Lake
- (left) Todd Creek
- (right) Bartholemew Creek
- (left) Severance Creek
- (left) Webster Creek
- (left) Gook Creek
- (right) Lilak Creek
- (right) Martin Creek
- (left) Mill Creek
- (left) Sutton Creek
- (right) Cokirs Creek, also known as Kocher Creek
- (left) Scott Creek
- (left) Tutstone Creek
- (right) Green River
- (right) Stevens Creek
- (right) Landslide Creek
  - (right) Cascade Creek
- (right) Section Thirteen Creek
- (right) Six Tile Creek

== Drainage basin ==
The Jordan River system drains all or portions of the following cities, villages and townships:

- Antrim County
  - Echo Township
  - Chestonia Township
  - Jordan Township
  - Star Township
  - Warner Township
- Charlevoix County
  - Boyne Valley Township
  - East Jordan
  - South Arm Township
  - Wilson Township

== See also ==
- List of rivers in Michigan
