= Cedar River (Antrim County, Michigan) =

Location
- Country: United States

Physical characteristics
- Source
  - location: Chestonia Township
- Mouth
  - location: Intermediate River
  - elevation: 614 ft (187 m)

Basin features
- River system: Elk River Chain of Lakes Watershed

Cedar River is an 11.6-mile-long (18.7 km) stream in Antrim County in the U.S. state of Michigan and is part of the Elk River Chain of Lakes Watershed, a tributary of Lake Michigan.

The Cedar River rises in southwest Chestonia Township at and flows mostly to the west into the Intermediate River in Bellaire at .

The North Branch Cedar River rises along the boundary between Chestonia and Kearney townships at and flows southwest into the main branch about a mile east of Bellaire at .

== Tributaries ==
From the mouth:

- Blair Lake
- (left) North Branch Cedar River
- (left) Woolcott Creek
- (right) Scotts Spring

== Drainage basin ==
The Cedar River drains portions of the following in Antrim County:

- City of Bellaire
- Chestonia Township
- Custer Township
- Kearney Township
- Mancelona Township
