= Mancelona Public Schools =

School district in Michigan

Address
- 112 St. Johns Avenue Mancelona, Antrim County, Michigan, 49659; United States

District information
- Grades: PreKindergarten–12
- Superintendent: Dr. Tina Frollo
- Schools: 3
- Budget: $12,319,000 2021-2022 expenditures
- NCES District ID: 2622350

Students and staff
- Students: 777 (2024-2025)
- Teachers: 47.57 (on an FTE basis) (2024-2025)
- Staff: 125.51 FTE (2024-2025)
- Student–teacher ratio: 16.33 (2024-2025)
- District mascot: Ironmen

Other information
- Website: www.mancelonaschools.org

Mancelona Public Schools is a public school district in Northern Michigan. In Antrim County, it serves Mancelona, Helena Township, Mancelona Township, and parts of the townships of Chestonia and Custer. In Kalkaska County, it serves parts of the townships of Cold Springs and Rapid River. The Northwest Educational Services, formerly the Traverse Bay Area Intermediate School District (TBAISD), serves the district.

== History ==
The first school in Mancelona was built in 1875. A larger school was built adjacent to it in 1882, and for a time both buildings were used. A new high school was built in 1930. The 1875 building was destroyed by fire in April 1947.

A new elementary school was built in 1951, and the high school received an addition in 1955. Later in the 1950s, the 1882 school was torn down.

Voters passed bond issues in 1997 ($15.995 million) and 2022 ($19.485 million) to build and renovate schools in the district.

== Schools ==
Schools in Mancelona Public Schools district
School	Address	Notes
Manelona High School	9300 West Limits Road, Mancelona	Grades 9–12
Mancelona Middle School	112 St. Johns Road, Mancelona	Grades 5–8
Mancelona Elementary	231 West Limits Road, Mancelona	Grades PreK-4
