= Antrim County =

Antrim County may refer to

- County Antrim in Northern Ireland
- Antrim County, Michigan, which was named after the county in Ireland.
