= Grass River =

Grass River or Grasse River may refer to:

- Grass River (Michigan), USA
- Grasse River, New York, USA
- Grass River (Manitoba), a tributary of the Nelson River in Canada
  - Grass River Provincial Park, Manitoba, Canada
