= 1929–30 Michigan State Normal Hurons men's basketball team =

American college basketball season

1929–30 Michigan State Normal Hurons men's basketball

Michigan Collegiate Conference Champions
- Conference: Michigan Collegiate Conference
- Record: 7–8 (3–1 MCC)
- Head coach: Elton Rynearson (9th season)
- Assistant coach: Warren Watson
- Home arena: Gymnasium

The 1929–30 Michigan State Normal Hurons men's basketball team represented the Michigan State Normal School, now Eastern Michigan University, in the 1929–30 NCAA men's basketball season. The team finished with a record of 7–8. The team was led by ninth year head coach Elton Rynearson and assistant coach Warren Watson. Whitney was the team Captain. They were the Michigan Collegiate Conference Champions, the first championship in school history. Giles was the teams leading scorer.

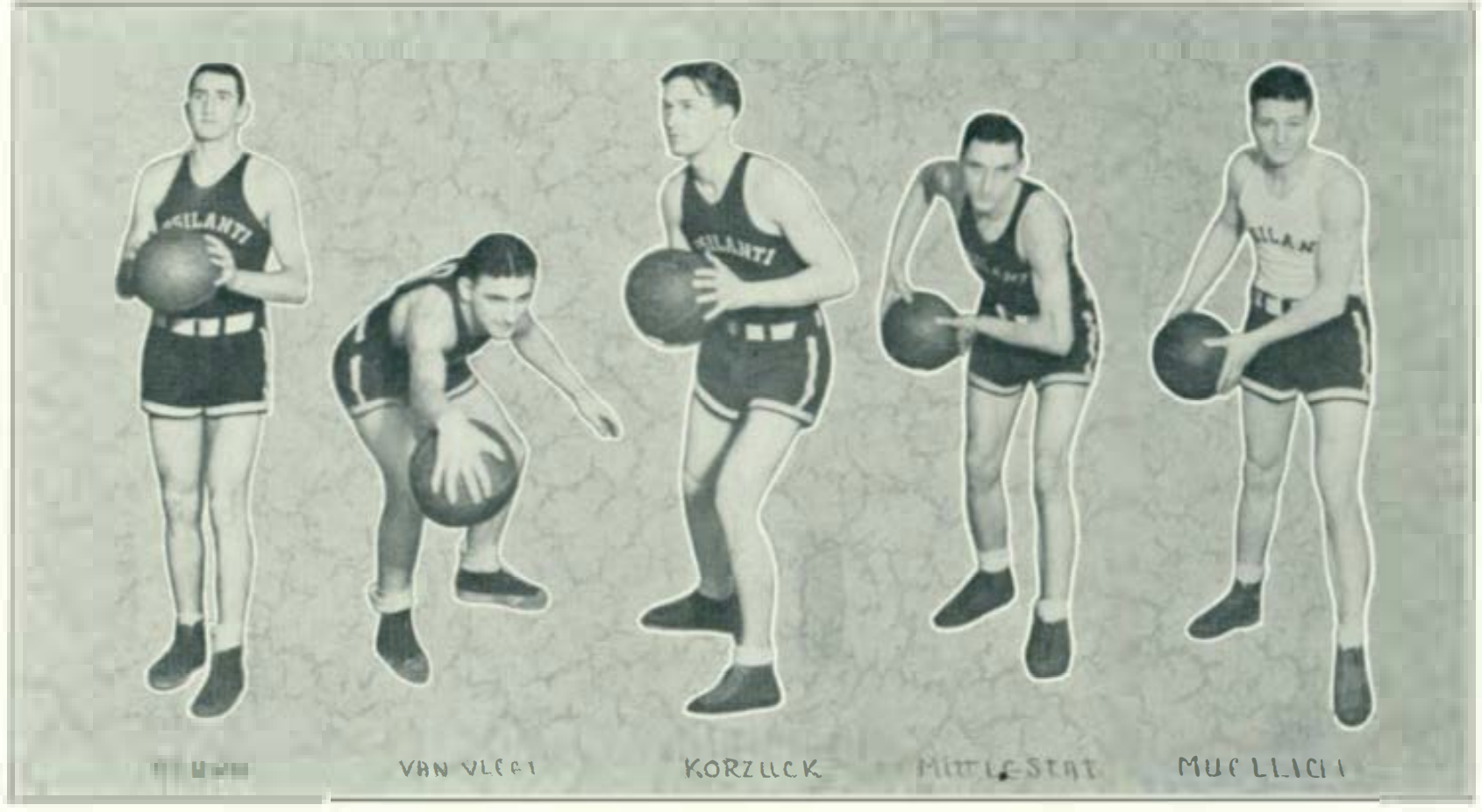
1930 EMU Basketball team picture 1

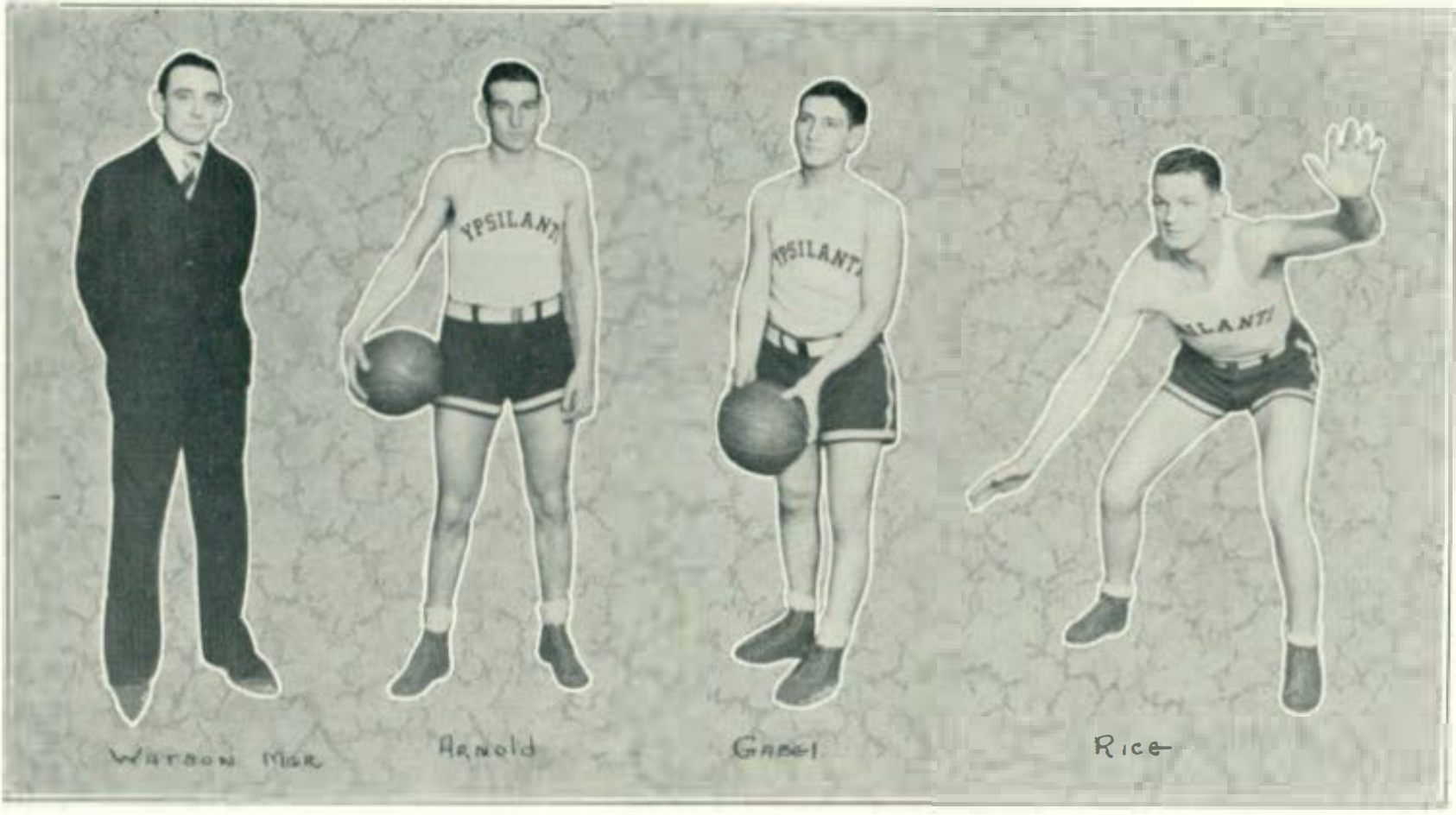
1930 EMU Basketball Team Picture 2

== Roster ==
Number	Name	Position	Class	Hometown
	Howard Leach	Guard	Sophomore	
	Cyrenus Korzuck	Guard	Sophomore	
	Arnold	Forward	Sophomore	
	Allan Giles	Forward	Senior	
	Howard Chanter		Junior	Jackson, MI
	Whitney	Guard	Senior	
	Ed Gabel	Forward	Sophomore	
	Gordon Rice	Center	Junior	Flint, MI
	George Muellich	Guard	Junior	
	Marvin Mittlestat	Center	Junior	
	William H. VanFleet	Forward	Senior	Detroit, MI
	Brown	Center		
	Kenneth DeLong		Junior	Alma, MI
	Joseph Moran		Senior	Alba, MI

== Schedule ==
Date time, TV	Opponent	Result	Record	Site (attendance) city, state
Non-conference regular season
*	Alumni	L 22-32	0–1	Gymnasium; Ypsilanti, MI
January 11, 1930*	Michigan “B”	L 29-35	0–2	Gymnasium; Ypsilanti, MI
January 15, 1930*	St. Mary's	L 23-42	0–3	Gymnasium; Ypsilanti, MI
January 17, 1930	Wayne State	L 21-29	0-4 (0-1)	Gymnasium; Ypsilanti, MI
January 21,1930*; 7:30	at Michigan “B”	L 22-25	0-5	Fielding H. Yost Field House; Ann Arbor, MI
January 24, 1930	at Central Michigan	W 22-18	1–5 (1-1)	Central Hall (1,200); Mount Pleasant, MI
January 27, 1930*	at Adrian	L 25-31	1–6	Adrian, MI
January 30, 1930*	St. Mary's	L 32-34	1-7	Gymnasium; Ypsilanti, MI
February 6, 1930 (Game was postponed)	Western Michigan			Gymnasium; Ypsilanti, MI
February 8, 1930	Central Michigan	W 28-26	2-7 (2-1)	Gymnasium; Ypsilanti, MI
February 13, 1930*	Adrian	W 26-22 ^{OT}	3–7	Gymnasium; Ypsilanti, MI
February 15, 1930*	Oberlin	L 22-27	3–8	Gymnasium; Ypsilanti, MI
February 20, 1930*	Illinois Tech	W 35-20	4–8	Gymnasium; Ypsilanti, MI
February 26, 1930	Wayne State	W 24-22	5–8 (3-1)	Gymnasium; Ypsilanti, MI
*	Northern Michigan	W 44-39	6–8	Gymnasium; Ypsilanti, MI
February 28, 1930	at Illinois Tech	W 31-26	7–8	Chicago, IL
March 4, 1930	at Western Michigan			East Hall Gymnasium; Kalamazoo, MI
*Non-conference game. (#) Tournament seedings in parentheses. All times are in Eastern Time.

== Game Notes ==
=== January 24, 1930 ===
First game with new bleachers.
