= Alba, Michigan =

- Census-designated place (CDP) & unincorporated community
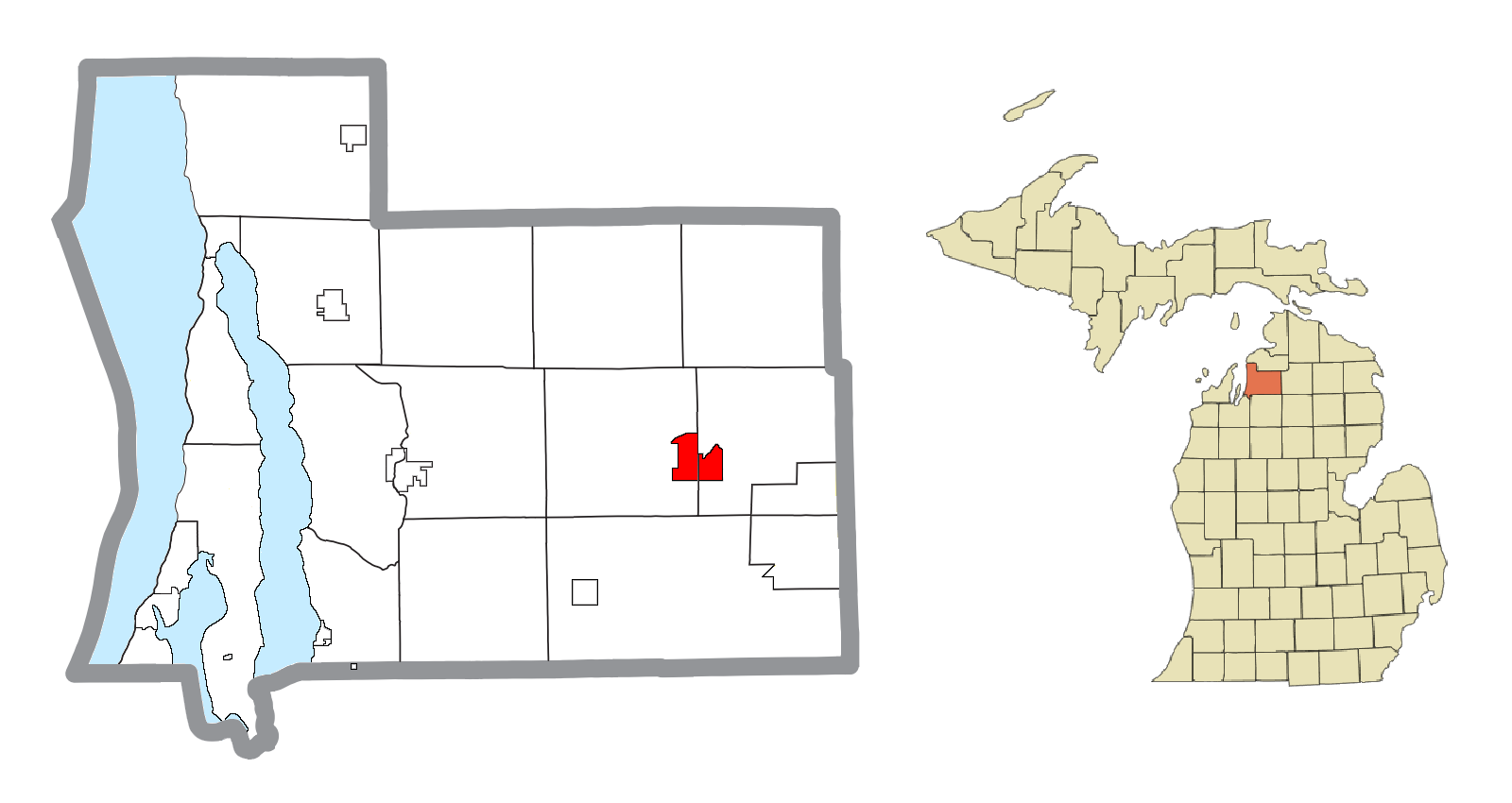
- Location within Antrim County

- Location within the state of Michigan Alba (the United States)
- Coordinates: 44°58′29″N 84°58′07″W
- Country: United States
- State: Michigan
- County: Antrim
- Townships: Chestonia and Star
- Established: 1876

Area
  - Total: 2.73 sq mi (7.07 km^{2})
  - Land: 2.73 sq mi (7.07 km^{2})
  - Water: 0 sq mi (0.00 km^{2})
- Elevation: 1,178 ft (359 m)

Population (2020)
  - Total: 287
  - Density: 105.3/sq mi (40.66/km^{2})
- Time zone: UTC-5 (Eastern (EST))
  - Summer (DST): UTC-4 (EDT)
- ZIP code(s): 49611
- Area code: 231
- GNIS feature ID: 619894

Alba is an unincorporated community and census-designated place (CDP) located in Antrim County in the U.S. state of Michigan. The population was 287 at the 2020 census.

Located just north of Mancelona along U.S. Route 131, Alba is divided between Star Township on the east and Chestonia Township on the west.

== History ==
Alba was first settled as a flag station named Cascade along the Grand Rapids and Indiana Railroad in 1876. At the time, it was part of Forest Home Township, Michigan. A post office opened on December 4, 1877, and the village was platted the next year. The name was changed to Alba in 1884 after local entertainer Alba Haywood.

The community of Alba was listed as a newly-organized census-designated place for the 2010 census, meaning it now has officially defined boundaries and population statistics for the first time.

== Geography ==
According to the U.S. Census Bureau, the Alba CDP has an area of 2.73 square miles (7.07 km^{2}), all land.

== Demographics ==
Alba consists of 128 households, of which the median income is $79,808. The employment rate is 84.2%. The population of Alba is approximately 94% White, 0.6% Black, 0.3% Hispanic or Latino, and 3.4% are two or more races

Historical population
Census	Pop.	Note	%±
2010	295		—
2020	287		−2.7%
U.S. Decennial Census
