= Jordan Township, Michigan =

- Civil township
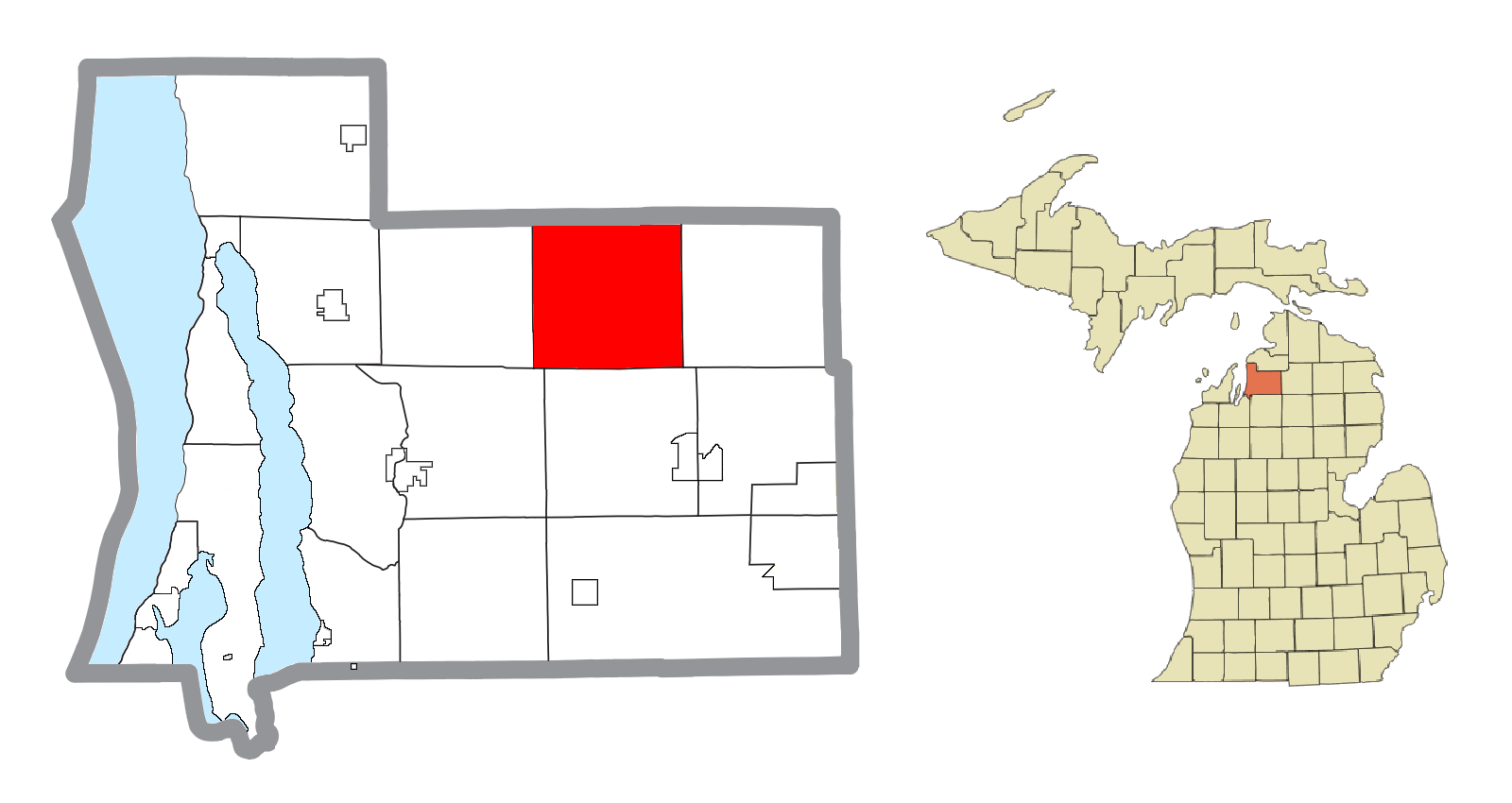
- Location within Antrim County

- Location within the state of Michigan Jordan Township (the United States)
- Coordinates: 45°04′35″N 85°03′15″W
- Country: United States
- State: Michigan
- County: Antrim

Government
  - Supervisor: Suzan 'Sue' Falco
  - Clerk: Amy Smith
  - Treasurer: Rebekah Meads

Area
  - Total: 35.2 sq mi (91.2 km^{2})
  - Land: 35.1 sq mi (90.9 km^{2})
  - Water: 0.15 sq mi (0.4 km^{2})
- Elevation: 856 ft (261 m)

Population (2020)
  - Total: 887
  - Density: 25.3/sq mi (9.76/km^{2})
- Time zone: UTC-5 (Eastern (EST))
  - Summer (DST): UTC-4 (EDT)
- ZIP code(s): 49659 (Mancelona); 49712 (Boyne City); 49727 (East Jordan)
- Area code: 231
- FIPS code: 26-41960
- GNIS feature ID: 1626544
- Website: Official website

Jordan Township is a civil township of Antrim County in the U.S. state of Michigan. The population was 887 at the 2020 census.

== Geography ==
According to the United States Census Bureau, the township has a total area of 35.2 square miles (91.2 km^{2}), of which 35.1 square miles (90.9 km^{2}) is land and 0.15 square miles (0.4 km^{2}), or 0.41%, is water.

== Communities ==
Chestonia 45°03′37″N 85°04′39″W was a town that once stood near the present-day junction of M-66 and East Old State Road. The town was founded when the Detroit and Charlevoix Railroad built a station at the town site. A post office was built near the depot and continued to operate until the 1960s. Today, Chestonia is but a ghost of its former self. No structures from the original town still stand, and the railroad grade is barely noticeable through the overgrowth of trees and weeds.

== Demographics ==
As of the census of 2000, there were 875 people, 323 households, and 240 families residing in the township. The population density was 24.8 inhabitants per square mile (9.6/km^{2}). There were 433 housing units at an average density of 12.3 per square mile (4.7/km^{2}). The racial makeup of the township was 96.00% White, 0.11% African American, 1.83% Native American, 0.69% Pacific Islander, and 1.37% from two or more races. Hispanic or Latino of any race were 1.14% of the population.

There were 323 households, out of which 36.8% had children under the age of 18 living with them, 60.7% were married couples living together, 7.7% had a female householder with no husband present, and 25.4% were non-families. 20.4% of all households were made up of individuals, and 8.7% had someone living alone who was 65 years of age or older. The average household size was 2.71 and the average family size was 3.08.

In the township the population was spread out, with 27.2% under the age of 18, 8.2% from 18 to 24, 30.5% from 25 to 44, 25.4% from 45 to 64, and 8.7% who were 65 years of age or older. The median age was 36 years. For every 100 females, there were 101.6 males. For every 100 females age 18 and over, there were 110.2 males.

The median income for a household in the township was $38,229, and the median income for a family was $41,250. Males had a median income of $29,886 versus $18,875 for females. The per capita income for the township was $16,420. About 10.6% of families and 12.9% of the population were below the poverty line, including 15.5% of those under age 18 and 2.2% of those age 65 or over.
