= Grass River (Michigan) =

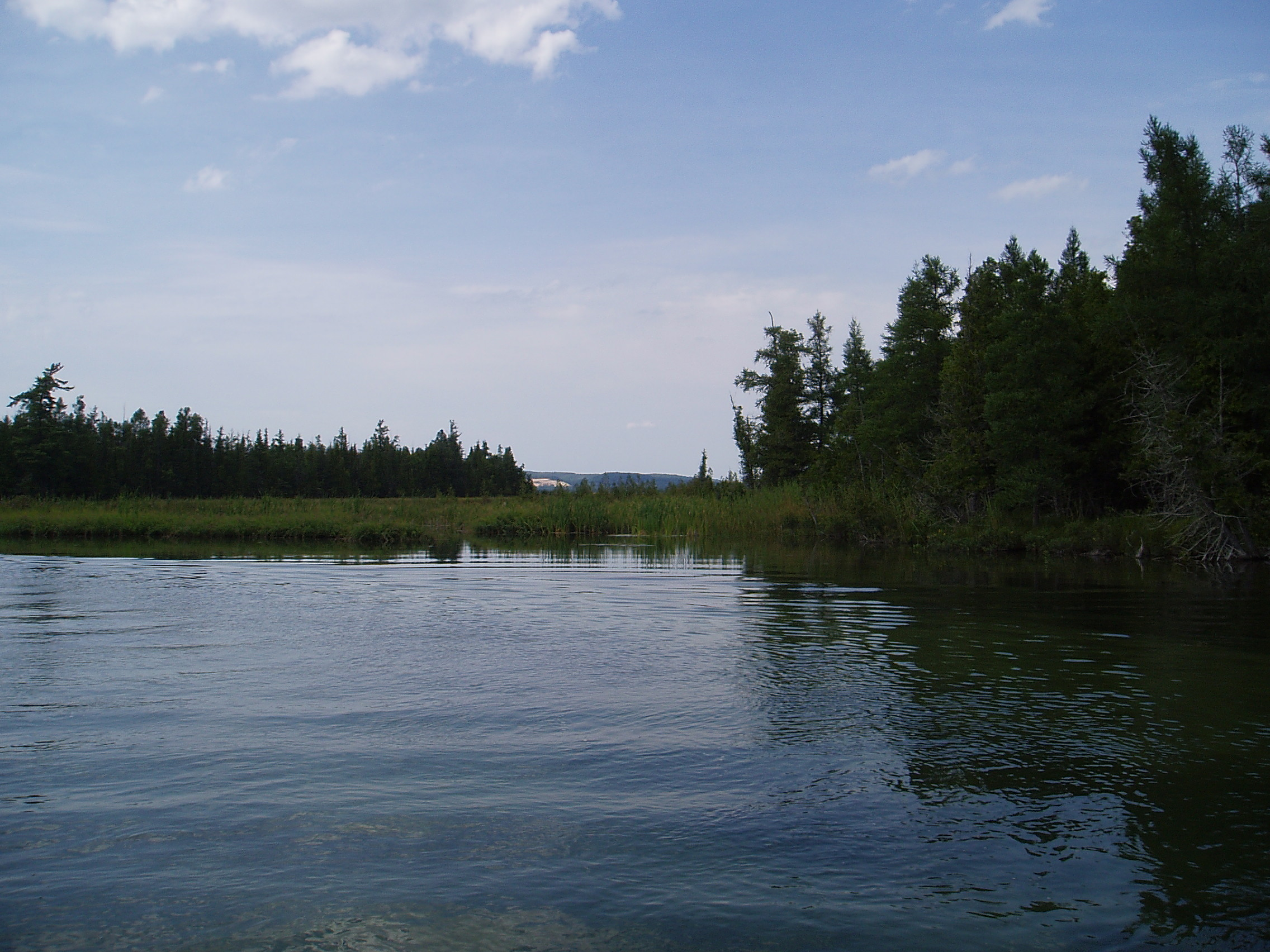
- Grass River Michigan

Physical characteristics
- Source
  - location: Lake Bellaire
  - coordinates: 44.94°N 85.21111°W
- Mouth
  - location: Clam Lake, Michigan
  - coordinates: 44.91722°N 85.22283°W
- Length: 2.3 mi (3.7 km)

The Grass River is a 2.3-mile-long (3.7 km) river in Antrim County in the U.S. state of Michigan. It is part of the Elk River Chain of Lakes Watershed that begins in northern Antrim County with Intermediate Lake, which is connected by the Intermediate River with Lake Bellaire. The Grass River flows from Lake Bellaire into Clam Lake, which in turn drains into Torch Lake via the short Clam River. Torch Lake itself is drained by the Torch River, which flows into Lake Skegemog, which opens into Elk Lake. Elk Lake flows into the east arm of Grand Traverse Bay at Elk Rapids.

The Grass River Natural Area is a park of 1,502 acres (6.08 km^{2}) of wetlands and wildlife habitat purchased since 1969 by the non-profit group Grass River Natural Area, Inc. There are 1.5 miles (2.4 km) of boardwalk trails, bridges, and observation platforms that provide easy access to river, stream, lake and wetlands. There are hiking trails with a total length of 7.5 miles (12.1 km), including the 2.2 miles (3.5 km) Grass River Natural Area Rail-Trail. This rail trail uses converted roadbed built in the late 1800s by the Chicago and West Michigan Railroad, and operated until the 1980s by the Chesapeake and Ohio Railway.

== See also ==
- Elk River Chain of Lakes Watershed
