= Milton Township, Antrim County, Michigan =

Milton Township, Michigan
- Civil township
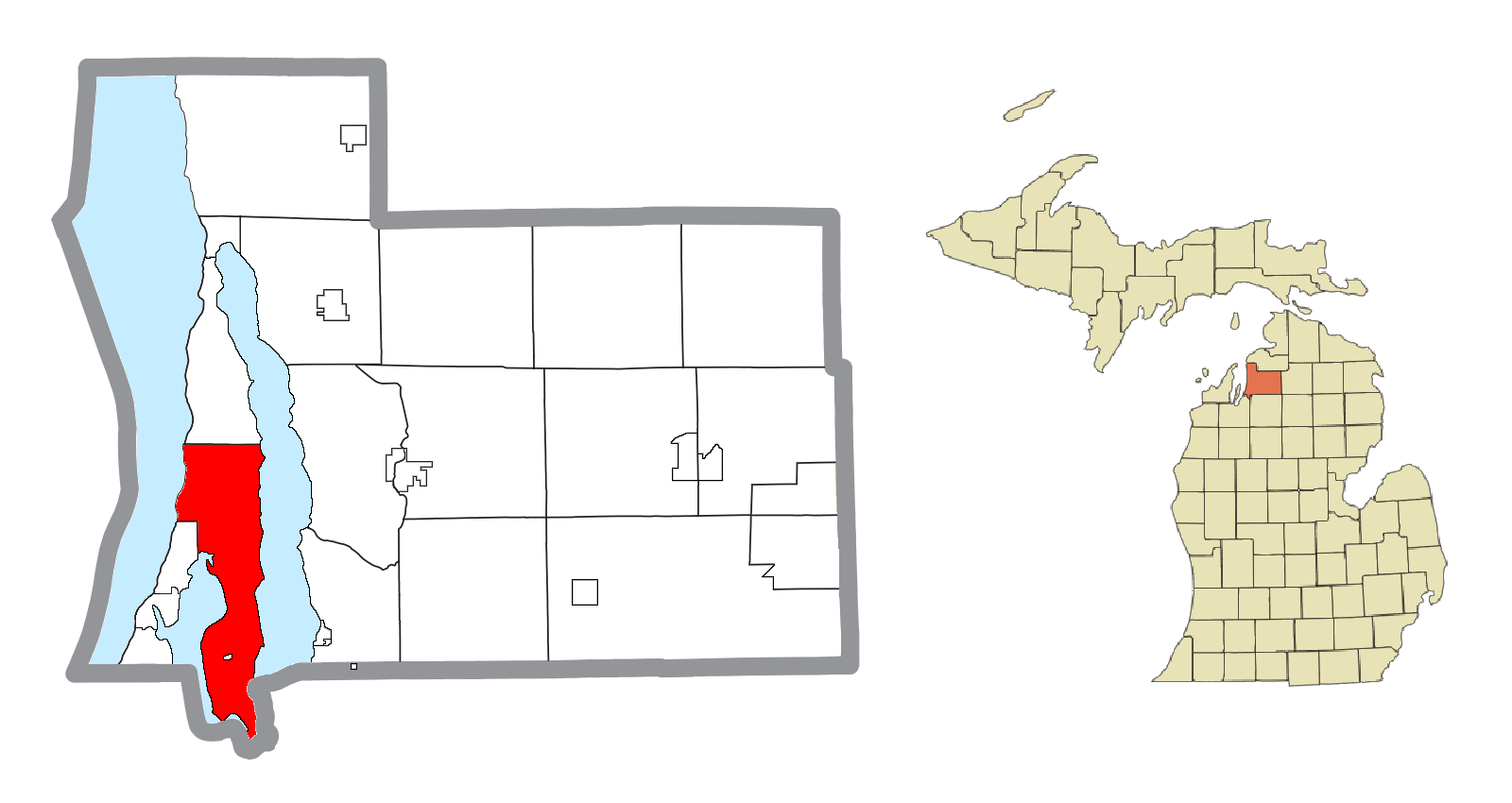
- Location within Antrim County

- Location within the state of Michigan Milton Township (the United States)
- Coordinates: 44°54′37″N 85°20′28″W
- Country: United States
- State: Michigan
- County: Antrim

Government
  - Supervisor: Lon Bargy
  - Clerk: Sandra Ball

Area
  - Total: 43.7 sq mi (113.1 km^{2})
  - Land: 25.6 sq mi (66.2 km^{2})
  - Water: 18.1 sq mi (46.9 km^{2})
- Elevation: 633 ft (193 m)

Population (2020)
  - Total: 2,355
  - Density: 92.1/sq mi (35.6/km^{2})
- Time zone: UTC-5 (Eastern (EST))
  - Summer (DST): UTC-4 (EDT)
- ZIP code(s): 49648 (Kewadin); 49676 (Rapid City)
- Area code: 231
- FIPS code: 26-54440
- GNIS feature ID: 1626747
- Website: Official website

Milton Township is a civil township of Antrim County in the U.S. state of Michigan. The population was 2,355 at the 2020 census.

== Communities ==
- Elgin was the name of a post office in this township from 1875 until 1881.
- Grand Traverse Band of Ottawa and Chippewa Indians occupies a small territory within Milton Township.
- Kewadin is an unincorporated community at 44°55′43″N 85°22′23″W. The Kewadin post office with ZIP code 49648 also serves large portions of Milton Township and Torch Lake Township. The Kewadin post office opened June 4, 1883.

== Geography ==
According to the United States Census Bureau, this northern Michigan township has a total area of 43.7 square miles (113.1 km^{2}), of which 25.6 square miles (66.2 km^{2}) is land and 18.1 square miles (46.9 km^{2}), or 41.46%, is water.

== Demographics ==
As of the census of 2000, there were 2,072 people, 850 households, and 651 families residing in the township. The population density was 80.2 inhabitants per square mile (31.0/km^{2}). There were 1,577 housing units at an average density of 61.0 per square mile (23.6/km^{2}). The racial makeup of the township was 96.33% White, 0.05% African American, 2.27% Native American, 0.19% Asian, 0.68% from other races, and 0.48% from two or more races. Hispanic or Latino of any race were 1.59% of the population.

There were 850 households, out of which 27.3% had children under the age of 18 living with them, 68.0% were married couples living together, 6.1% had a female householder with no husband present, and 23.3% were non-families. 20.2% of all households were made up of individuals, and 9.1% had someone living alone who was 65 years of age or older. The average household size was 2.42 and the average family size was 2.77.

In the township the population was spread out, with 21.9% under the age of 18, 4.5% from 18 to 24, 22.7% from 25 to 44, 30.4% from 45 to 64, and 20.5% who were 65 years of age or older. The median age was 46 years. For every 100 females, there were 102.3 males. For every 100 females age 18 and over, there were 97.1 males.

The median income for a household in the township was $44,890, and the median income for a family was $50,568. Males had a median income of $37,578 versus $23,942 for females. The per capita income for the township was $26,817. About 3.2% of families and 5.0% of the population were below the poverty line, including 4.9% of those under age 18 and 1.5% of those age 65 or over.
