= Antrim County, Michigan =

County in Michigan, United States

- County
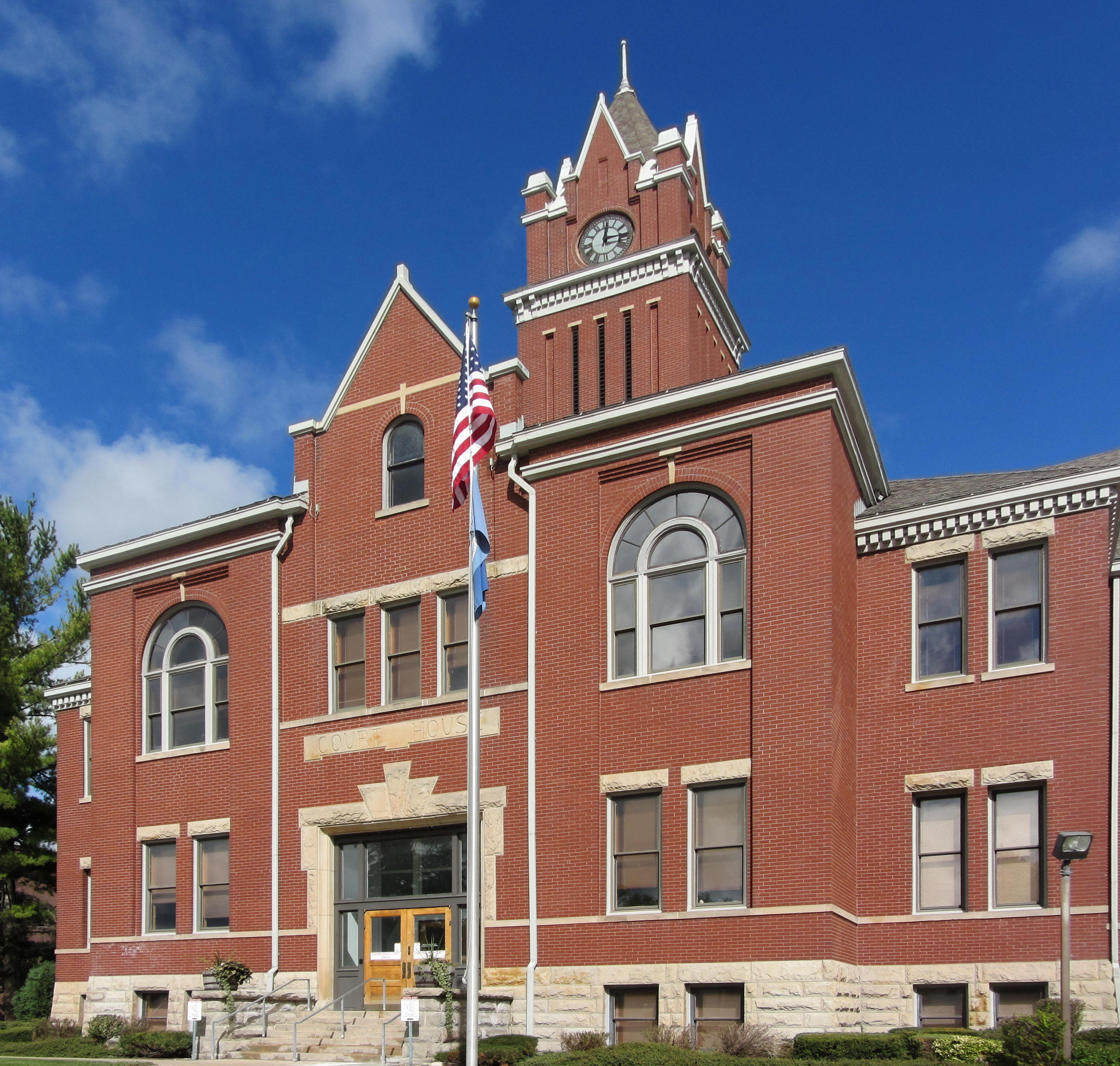
- Antrim County Courthouse

- Location within the U.S. state of Michigan
- Coordinates: 45°01′N 85°11′W
- Country: United States
- State: Michigan
- Authorized: 1840
- Organized: 1863
- Named for: County Antrim
- Seat: Bellaire
- Largest village: Elk Rapids

Area
  - Total: 602 sq mi (1,560 km^{2})
  - Land: 476 sq mi (1,230 km^{2})
  - Water: 126 sq mi (330 km^{2}) 21%

Population (2020)
  - Total: 23,431
  - Estimate (2025): 24,698 ▲
  - Density: 49.2/sq mi (19.0/km^{2})
- Time zone: UTC−5 (Eastern)
  - Summer (DST): UTC−4 (EDT)
- Congressional district: 1st
- Website: https://www.antrimcountymi.gov/

Antrim County (/ˈæntrəm/ AN-trəm) is a county located in the U.S. state of Michigan. As of the 2020 census, the population was 23,431. The county seat is Bellaire. The name is taken from County Antrim in Northern Ireland. Antrim County is home to Torch Lake, Michigan's deepest and second-largest inland lake. Torch Lake, famous for its clear and blue waters, is part of the Chain of Lakes Watershed, most of which lies within Antrim County. The county is bordered to the west by Grand Traverse Bay, a bay of Lake Michigan.

== History ==
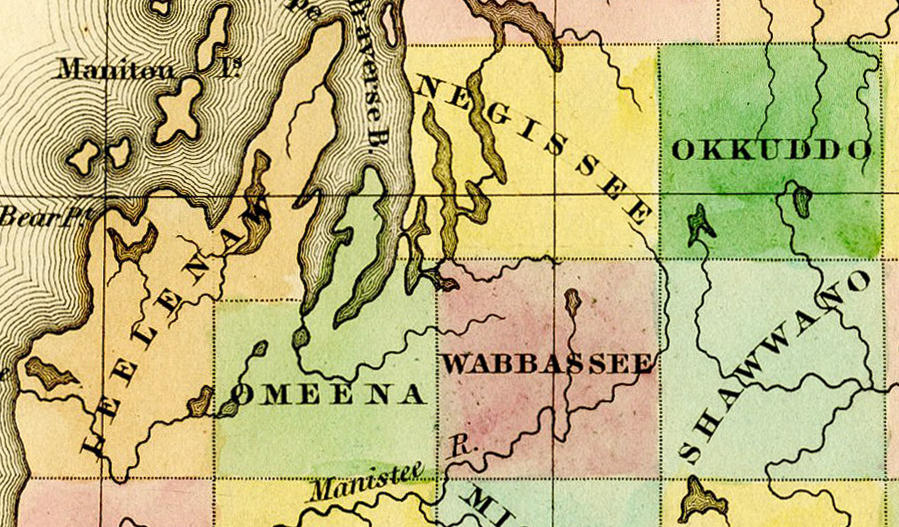
A detail from A New Map of Michigan with its Canals, Roads & Distances (1842) by Henry Schenck Tanner, showing Antrim County during the period when it was named Meegisee County, its name from 1840 to 1843. The name is misspelled as "Negissee" on the map. Several nearby counties are also shown with names that would later be changed.

Map of the Chain of Lakes, the watershed of which dominates much of western Antrim County.

Meegisee County (/miːɡəsi/ MEE-gə-see) was separated from Michilimackinac County as an unorganized county in 1840. It took its name from a Chippewa chief who signed the 1821 Treaty of Chicago and the 1826 Treaty of Mississinewas. Meegisee also derives from the Ojibwe migizi, meaning bald eagle. The county was renamed Antrim County in 1843, one of the Irish names given to five renamed Michigan counties at that time, supposedly in deference to the increasing number of settlers of Irish heritage in Michigan at that time. In the text of the 1843 legislative act, the name was misspelled as "Antim". In 1851, for governmental purposes, Antrim County was attached to Grand Traverse County.

Separate county government was organized in 1863. The county seat was originally located in Elk Rapids, but was moved to Bellaire in 1904 after 25 years of litigation. In 1950 its population was 10,721.

YMCA Camp Hayo-Went-Ha, the oldest American summer camp that sits on its original site, was opened on the shore of Torch Lake in Central Lake Township in 1904.

Antrim County, which has reliably elected Republicans, was in national headlines during the 2020 presidential election because the unofficial tally showed Biden surprisingly ahead on election night. When the County Clerk realized that it was caused by human error, she corrected the tally before submitting to the Secretary of State for certification. Nonetheless, this error and a related lawsuit have been cited in multiple election conspiracies.

== Geography ==
According to the U.S. Census Bureau, the county has a total area of 602 square miles (1,560 km^{2}), of which 476 square miles (1,230 km^{2}) is land and 126 square miles (330 km^{2}) (21%) is water.

Antrim County is flanked to the west by Grand Traverse Bay, a bay of Lake Michigan. Most of the bodies of water within the Chain of Lakes, including Torch Lake, are within Antrim County.

=== Lakes ===
- Lake Arthur
- Bass Lake
- Bates Lake
- Beals Lake
- Lake Bellaire
- Benway Lake
- Birch Lake
- Boat Lake
- Browning Lake
- Carpenter Lake
- Clam Lake
- Eaton Lake
- Elk Lake
- Ellsworth Lake
- Finn Lake
- Grass Lake
- Green Lake
- Hanley Lake
- Harwood Lake
- Hawk Lake
- Henry Lake
- Intermediate Lake
- Lake of the Woods
- Lime Lake
- Little Torch Lake
- Lyman Lake
- Maplehurst Lake
- Moblo Lake
- Mud Lake
- Scotts Lake
- Six Mile Lake
- Lake Skegemog
- Skinner Lake
- Smith Lake
- St. Clair Lake
- Thayer Lake
- Toad Lake
- Torch Lake
- Wetzel Lake
- Wilson Lake

=== Rivers ===
- Boyne River
- Cedar River
- Dingman River
- Elk River
- Grass River
- Green River
- Intermediate River
- Jordan River
- Manistee River
- Torch River

=== Adjacent counties ===
By land

- Charlevoix County (north)
- Otsego County (east)
- Crawford County (southeast)
- Kalkaska County (south)
- Grand Traverse County (southwest)

By water

- Leelanau County (west)

== Communities ==
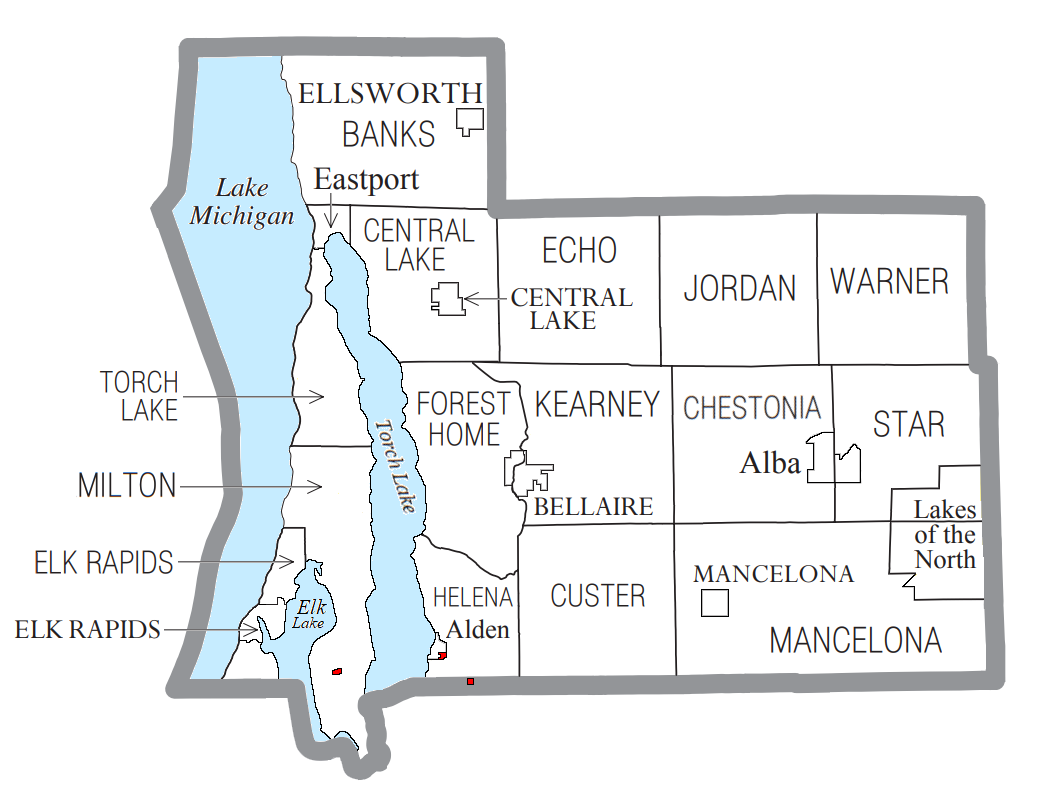
U.S. Census data map showing local municipal boundaries within Antrim County, as well as CDP boundaries. The small red sections denote territory of the Grand Traverse Indian Reservation.

=== Villages ===
- Bellaire (county seat)
- Central Lake
- Elk Rapids
- Ellsworth
- Mancelona

=== Civil townships ===
- Banks Township
- Central Lake Township
- Chestonia Township
- Custer Township
- Echo Township
- Elk Rapids Township
- Forest Home Township
- Helena Township
- Jordan Township
- Kearney Township
- Mancelona Township
- Milton Township
- Star Township
- Torch Lake Township
- Warner Township

=== Census-designated places ===
- Alba
- Alden
- Eastport
- Lakes of the North

=== Unincorporated communities ===
- Antrim
- Atwood
- Chestonia
- Clam River
- Creswell
- Elmira
- Finkton
- Green River
- Kewadin
- North Arms
- Pleasant Valley
- Snowflake
- Torch Lake
- Torch River
- Wetzel

=== Ghost towns ===
- Antrim City
- Comfort
- Elgin
- Essex

=== Indian reservations ===
- Grand Traverse Indian Reservation, which has territories in five counties, occupies two small sections within Helena Township and one section in Milton Township.

== Demographics ==
Historical population
| Census | Pop. | Note | %± |
|---|---|---|---|
| 1860 | 179 | | — |
| 1870 | 1,985 | | 1,008.9% |
| 1880 | 5,237 | | 163.8% |
| 1890 | 10,413 | | 98.8% |
| 1900 | 16,568 | | 59.1% |
| 1910 | 15,692 | | −5.3% |
| 1920 | 11,543 | | −26.4% |
| 1930 | 9,979 | | −13.5% |
| 1940 | 10,964 | | 9.9% |
| 1950 | 10,721 | | −2.2% |
| 1960 | 10,373 | | −3.2% |
| 1970 | 12,612 | | 21.6% |
| 1980 | 16,194 | | 28.4% |
| 1990 | 18,185 | | 12.3% |
| 2000 | 23,110 | | 27.1% |
| 2010 | 23,580 | | 2.0% |
| 2020 | 23,431 | | −0.6% |
| 2025 (est.) | 24,698 | ▲ | 5.4% |
US Decennial Census; 1790-1960 1900-1990; 1990-2000 2010-2018

=== Racial and ethnic composition ===
Antrim County, Michigan – Racial and ethnic composition Note: the US Census treats Hispanic/Latino as an ethnic category. This table excludes Latinos from the racial categories and assigns them to a separate category. Hispanics/Latinos may be of any race.
| Race / Ethnicity (NH = Non-Hispanic) | Pop 1980 | Pop 1990 | Pop 2000 | Pop 2010 | Pop 2020 | % 1980 | % 1990 | % 2000 | % 2010 | % 2020 |
|---|---|---|---|---|---|---|---|---|---|---|
| White alone (NH) | 15,969 | 17,829 | 22,235 | 22,546 | 21,743 | 98.61% | 98.04% | 96.21% | 95.61% | 92.80% |
| Black or African American alone (NH) | 15 | 23 | 42 | 35 | 39 | 0.09% | 0.13% | 0.18% | 0.15% | 0.17% |
| Native American or Alaska Native alone (NH) | 119 | 210 | 236 | 224 | 192 | 0.73% | 1.15% | 1.02% | 0.95% | 0.82% |
| Asian alone (NH) | 20 | 24 | 35 | 47 | 70 | 0.12% | 0.13% | 0.15% | 0.20% | 0.30% |
| Native Hawaiian or Pacific Islander alone (NH) | x | x | 22 | 8 | 18 | x | x | 0.10% | 0.03% | 0.08% |
| Other race alone (NH) | 6 | 3 | 4 | 11 | 55 | 0.04% | 0.02% | 0.02% | 0.05% | 0.23% |
| Mixed race or Multiracial (NH) | x | x | 252 | 305 | 855 | x | x | 1.09% | 1.29% | 3.65% |
| Hispanic or Latino (any race) | 65 | 96 | 284 | 404 | 459 | 0.40% | 0.53% | 1.23% | 1.71% | 1.96% |
| Total | 16,194 | 18,185 | 23,110 | 23,580 | 23,431 | 100.00% | 100.00% | 100.00% | 100.00% | 100.00% |

=== 2020 census ===
As of the 2020 census, the county had a population of 23,431. The median age was 52.1 years. 17.6% of residents were under the age of 18 and 28.1% of residents were 65 years of age or older. For every 100 females there were 100.3 males, and for every 100 females age 18 and over there were 100.0 males age 18 and over.

The racial makeup of the county was 93.5% White, 0.2% Black or African American, 0.9% American Indian and Alaska Native, 0.3% Asian, 0.1% Native Hawaiian and Pacific Islander, 0.6% from some other race, and 4.5% from two or more races. Hispanic or Latino residents of any race comprised 2.0% of the population.

<0.1% of residents lived in urban areas, while 100.0% lived in rural areas.

There were 10,147 households in the county, of which 21.6% had children under the age of 18 living in them. Of all households, 53.6% were married-couple households, 18.6% were households with a male householder and no spouse or partner present, and 21.0% were households with a female householder and no spouse or partner present. About 27.6% of all households were made up of individuals and 14.7% had someone living alone who was 65 years of age or older.

There were 17,538 housing units, of which 42.1% were vacant. Among occupied housing units, 85.0% were owner-occupied and 15.0% were renter-occupied. The homeowner vacancy rate was 1.4% and the rental vacancy rate was 16.1%.

=== 2010 census ===
As of the 2010 United States census, there were 23,580 people, 9,890 households, and 6,925 families in the county.

== Government ==
Antrim County has been reliably Republican since its organization. Since 1884 its voters have selected the Republican Party nominee in 94% (34 of 36) of the national elections through 2024.

United States presidential election results for Antrim County, Michigan
| Year | Republican | | Democratic | | Third party(ies) | |
| Year | No. | % | No. | % | No. | % |
|---|---|---|---|---|---|---|
| 1884 | 1,066 | 58.44% | 721 | 39.53% | 37 | 2.03% |
| 1888 | 1,305 | 56.74% | 881 | 38.30% | 114 | 4.96% |
| 1892 | 1,140 | 52.17% | 814 | 37.25% | 231 | 10.57% |
| 1896 | 1,886 | 58.05% | 1,228 | 37.80% | 135 | 4.16% |
| 1900 | 2,575 | 74.90% | 729 | 21.20% | 134 | 3.90% |
| 1904 | 2,608 | 82.90% | 436 | 13.86% | 102 | 3.24% |
| 1908 | 2,020 | 73.21% | 574 | 20.80% | 165 | 5.98% |
| 1912 | 603 | 24.22% | 450 | 18.07% | 1,437 | 57.71% |
| 1916 | 1,336 | 53.91% | 932 | 37.61% | 210 | 8.47% |
| 1920 | 2,260 | 77.53% | 518 | 17.77% | 137 | 4.70% |
| 1924 | 2,246 | 76.79% | 371 | 12.68% | 308 | 10.53% |
| 1928 | 2,756 | 84.46% | 484 | 14.83% | 23 | 0.70% |
| 1932 | 2,308 | 55.51% | 1,686 | 40.55% | 164 | 3.94% |
| 1936 | 2,391 | 51.89% | 2,032 | 44.10% | 185 | 4.01% |
| 1940 | 3,027 | 66.48% | 1,497 | 32.88% | 29 | 0.64% |
| 1944 | 2,626 | 67.66% | 1,206 | 31.07% | 49 | 1.26% |
| 1948 | 2,588 | 67.24% | 1,129 | 29.33% | 132 | 3.43% |
| 1952 | 3,533 | 76.50% | 1,046 | 22.65% | 39 | 0.84% |
| 1956 | 3,623 | 72.34% | 1,376 | 27.48% | 9 | 0.18% |
| 1960 | 3,398 | 67.26% | 1,647 | 32.60% | 7 | 0.14% |
| 1964 | 2,172 | 44.66% | 2,684 | 55.19% | 7 | 0.14% |
| 1968 | 3,002 | 59.23% | 1,690 | 33.35% | 376 | 7.42% |
| 1972 | 4,068 | 64.77% | 2,000 | 31.84% | 213 | 3.39% |
| 1976 | 4,369 | 58.11% | 3,032 | 40.33% | 117 | 1.56% |
| 1980 | 4,706 | 56.26% | 2,909 | 34.78% | 749 | 8.96% |
| 1984 | 5,726 | 69.18% | 2,507 | 30.29% | 44 | 0.53% |
| 1988 | 5,231 | 61.95% | 3,159 | 37.41% | 54 | 0.64% |
| 1992 | 3,984 | 39.88% | 3,431 | 34.34% | 2,576 | 25.78% |
| 1996 | 4,630 | 45.85% | 4,226 | 41.85% | 1,242 | 12.30% |
| 2000 | 6,780 | 58.92% | 4,329 | 37.62% | 398 | 3.46% |
| 2004 | 8,379 | 61.52% | 5,072 | 37.24% | 168 | 1.23% |
| 2008 | 7,506 | 54.19% | 6,079 | 43.89% | 267 | 1.93% |
| 2012 | 7,917 | 60.00% | 5,107 | 38.70% | 171 | 1.30% |
| 2016 | 8,469 | 61.97% | 4,448 | 32.55% | 750 | 5.49% |
| 2020 | 9,748 | 61.03% | 5,960 | 37.32% | 264 | 1.65% |
| 2024 | 10,341 | 61.25% | 6,330 | 37.49% | 212 | 1.26% |

United States Senate election results for Antrim County, Michigan1
| Year | Republican | | Democratic | | Third party(ies) | |
| Year | No. | % | No. | % | No. | % |
|---|---|---|---|---|---|---|
| 2024 | 10,136 | 60.58% | 6,178 | 36.92% | 418 | 2.50% |

Michigan Gubernatorial election results for Antrim County
| Year | Republican | | Democratic | | Third party(ies) | |
| Year | No. | % | No. | % | No. | % |
|---|---|---|---|---|---|---|
| 2022 | 7,827 | 55.85% | 5,937 | 42.36% | 250 | 1.78% |

Antrim County operates the County jail, maintains rural roads, operates the major local courts, records deeds, mortgages, and vital records, administers public health regulations, and participates with the state in the provision of social services. The county board of commissioners controls the budget and has limited authority to make laws or ordinances. In Michigan, most local government functions – police and fire, building and zoning, tax assessment, street maintenance etc. – are the responsibility of individual cities and townships.

=== Elected officials ===
- Prosecuting Attorney: Wilson Brott
- Sheriff: Kevin S. Hoch
- County Clerk: Victoria Bishop
- County Treasurer: Sherry A. Comben
- Register of Deeds: Patty Niepoth
- Drain Commissioner: Leslie Meyers
- County Surveyor: Scott Papineau

(information as of March 2025)

== Education ==
The Northwest Education Services, based in Traverse City, services the students in the county along with those of Benzie, Grand Traverse, Leelanau, and Kalkaska. The intermediate school district offers regional special education services, early education and English learner programs, and technical career pathways for students of its districts.

Antrim County is served by the following regular public school districts:

- Alba Public Schools
- Bellaire Public Schools
- Boyne City Public Schools
- Boyne Falls Public School District
- Central Lake Public Schools
- Charlevoix Public Schools
- East Jordan Public Schools
- Elk Rapids Schools
- Ellsworth Community Schools
- Gaylord Community Schools
- Mancelona Public Schools

Antrim County has the one private school, the Ebenezer Christian School (Christian).

== Transportation ==
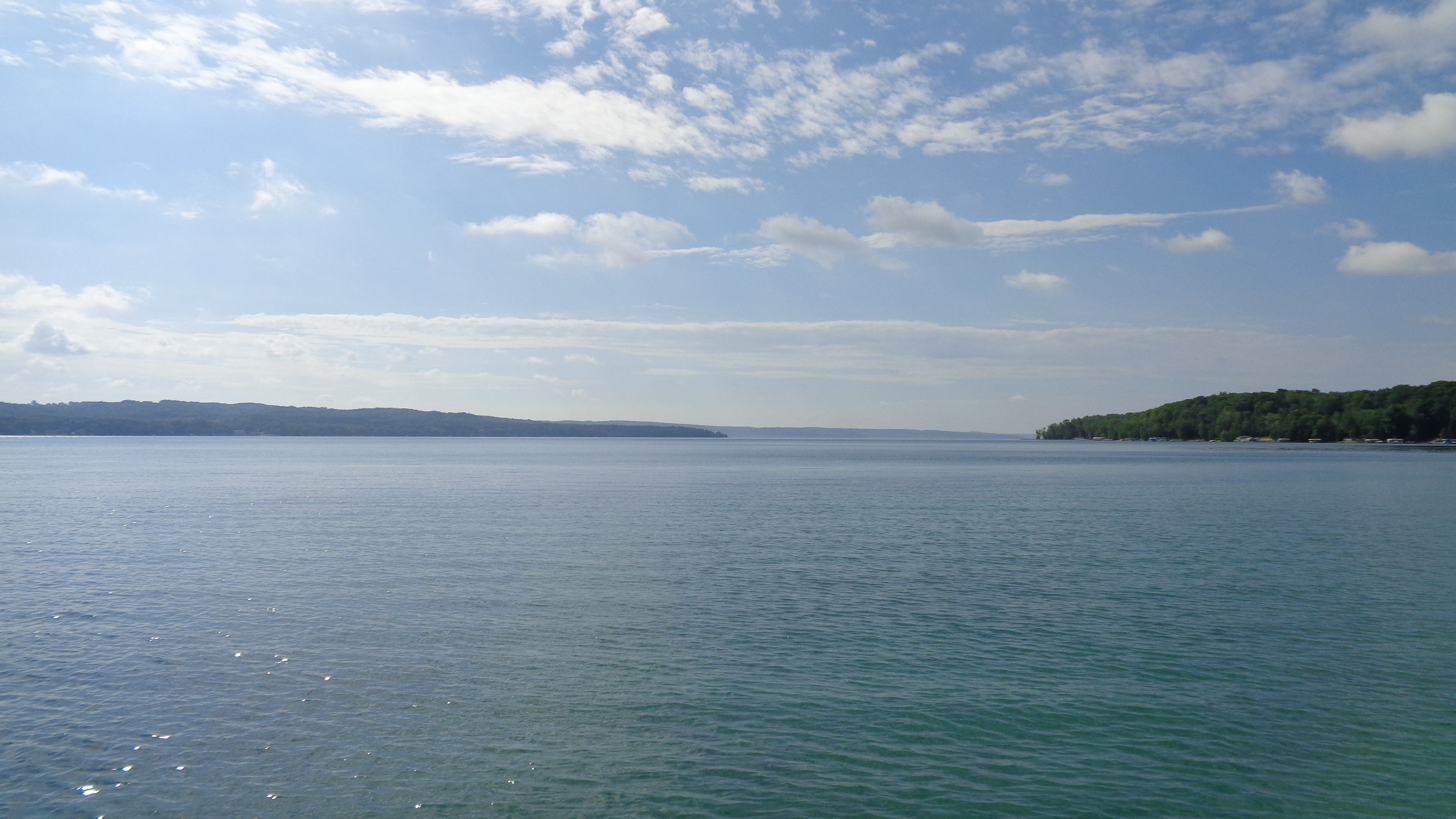
View of Torch Lake.

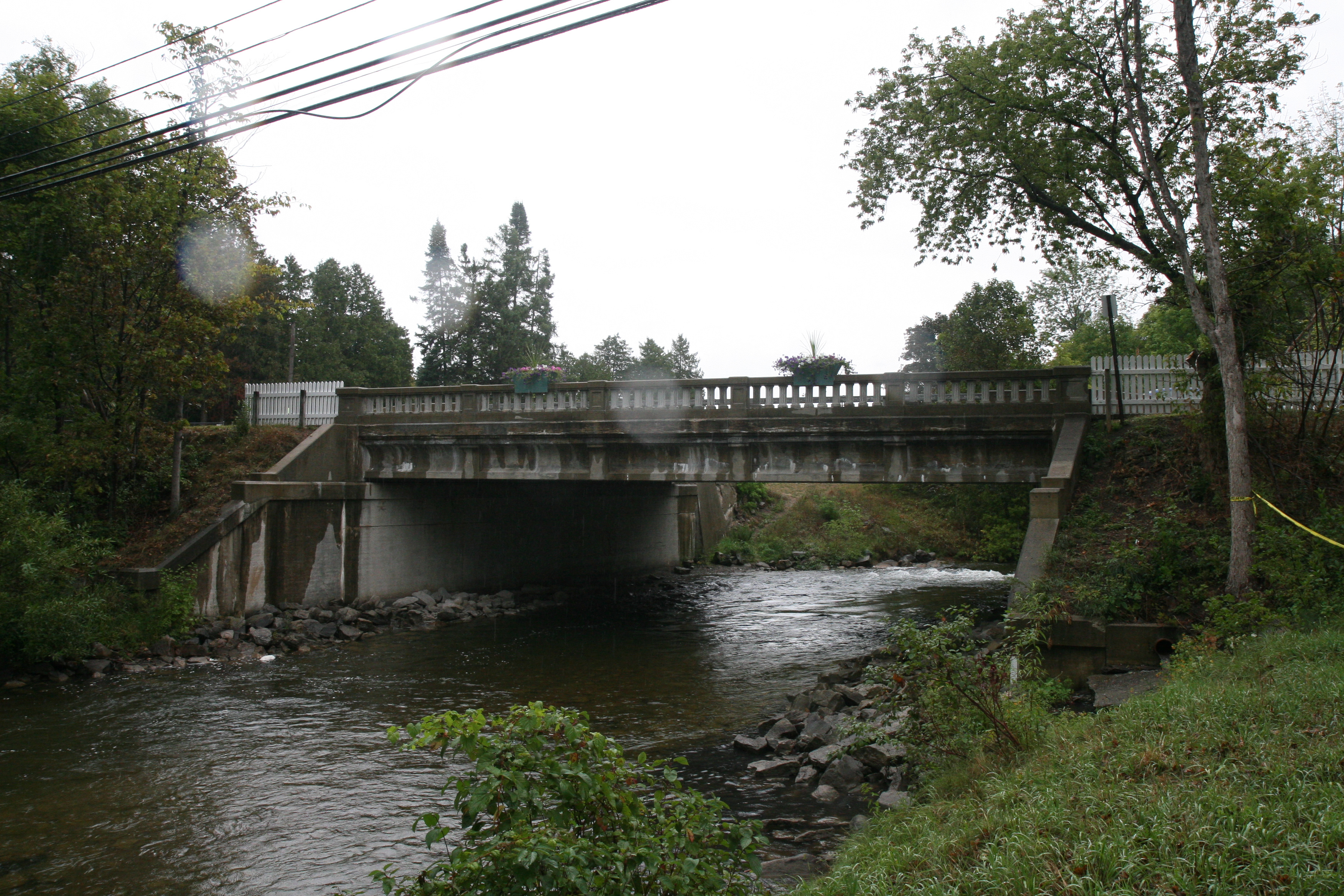
M-88 bridge over the Intermediate River in Bellaire.

=== State-maintained highways ===
- US 31 is a north–south highway that runs along the shore of Grand Traverse Bay in western Antrim County, passing through the communities of Elk Rapids, Torch Lake, Eastport, and Atwood. South of Antrim County, US 31 enters Traverse City, and continues further south along the Lake Michigan, passing cities such as Manistee, Ludington, Muskegon, Grand Haven, Holland, and Benton Harbor. North of Antrim County, US 31 passes through Charlevoix and Petoskey before terminating at Interstate 75 south of Mackinaw City.
- US 131 in Antrim County follows a largely southwest–northeast route in the pastoral east of the county, passing through the communities of Mancelona and Alba. Following a north–south route further inland than US 31, the highway passes through cities to the south such as Kalamazoo, Grand Rapids and Cadillac. North of Antrim County, the highway terminates at US 31 in Petoskey.
- M-32 is an east–west highway in northeastern Antrim County. The highway begins at East Jordan, just north of the Antrim County line, and continues east toward Elmira, Gaylord, Atlanta, Hillman, and Alpena. In Antrim County, M-32 shares a brief concurrency with US 131.
- M-66 is a north–south highway that runs through central Antrim County. The highway enters from the south via a concurrency with US 131. At Mancelona, M-66 takes on an independent route, running north to East Jordan before terminating at US 31 at Charlevoix. South of Antrim County, M-66 runs through communities such as Sturgis, Battle Creek, Ionia, Lake City, and Kalkaska.
- M-88 is an s-shaped highway, signed as an east–west route, that runs entirely within Antrim County. The highway serves to connect Antrim County's interior villages, Bellaire and Central Lake, with US 31 at Eastport and US 131/M-66 at Mancelona.

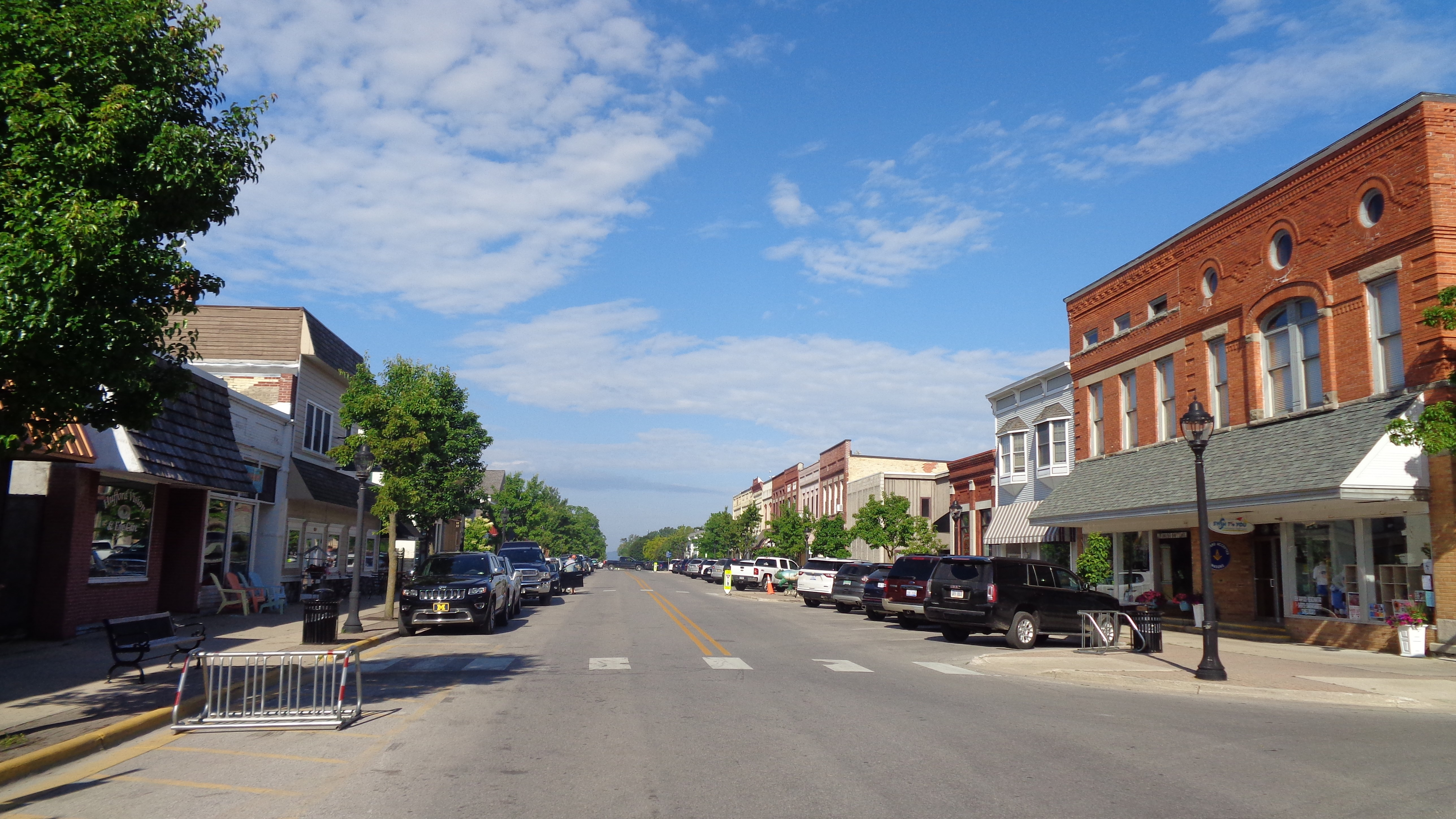
Downtown Elk Rapids.

=== County-designated highways ===
- C-38 serves as an easterly extension of M-88. The highway begins at US 131/M-66 in Mancelona, and continues east to Otsego County.
- C-42 serves as a cutoff between US 131 at Alba and M-32 west of Gaylord in Otsego County.
- C-48 is an east–west route in northwest Antrim County, connecting US 31 near Atwood to the village of Ellsworth and M-66 at East Jordan.
- C-65 is a north–south route in northern Antrim County, connecting Ellsworth to US 31 in Charlevoix County.
- C-73 is a short route in northeastern Antrim County, serving as a direct route between M-32 and M-75 near Boyne City.

=== Airports ===
- Antrim County Airport - county-owned public-use airport, northeast of Bellaire, for general aviation. One paved runway. No airline service.

== See also ==
- List of Michigan State Historic Sites in Antrim County, Michigan
- National Register of Historic Places listings in Antrim County, Michigan
