= Mancelona, Michigan =

Village in Antrim County, Michigan, US

- Village
- Village of Mancelona
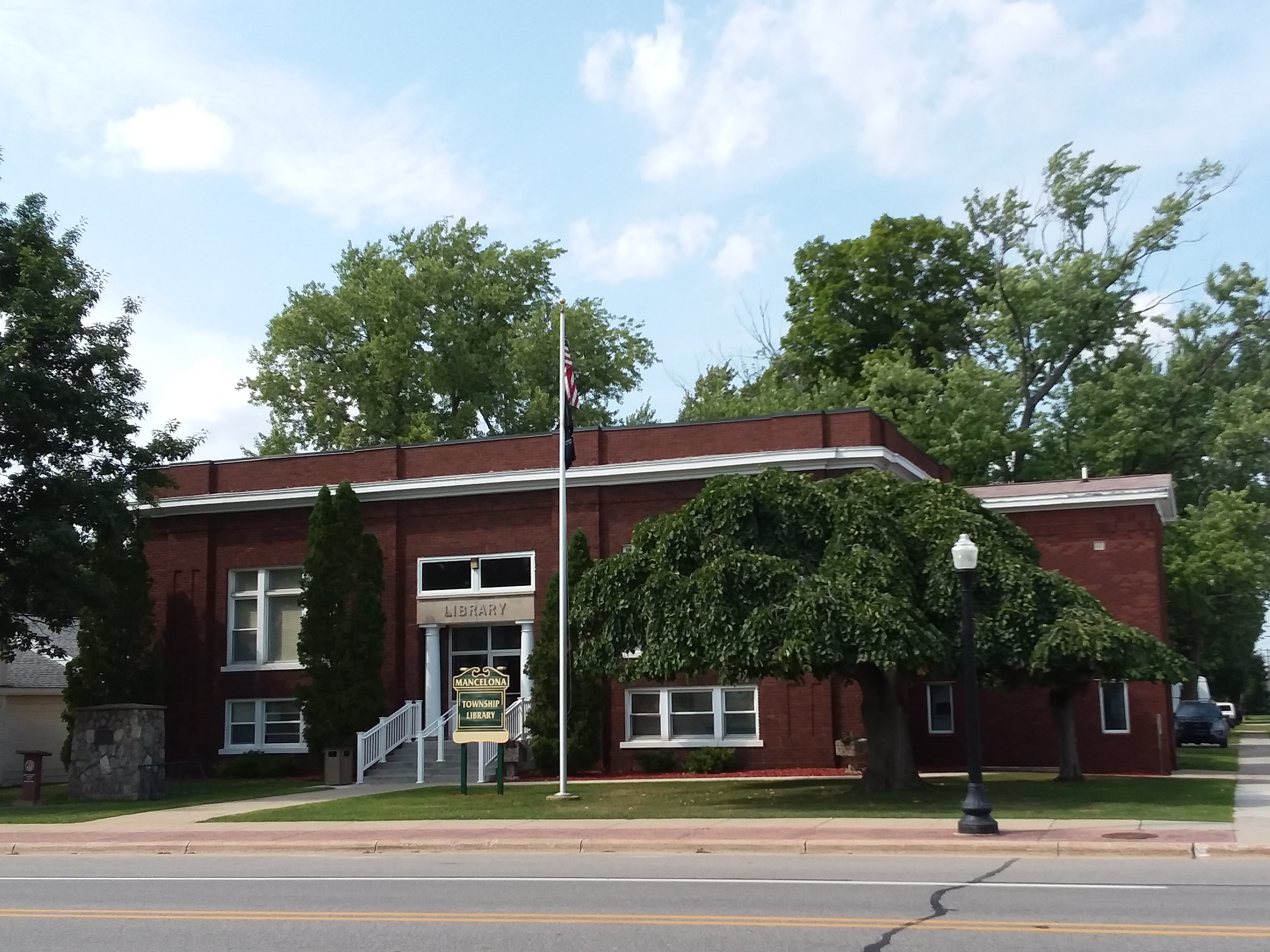
- Mancelona Township Library

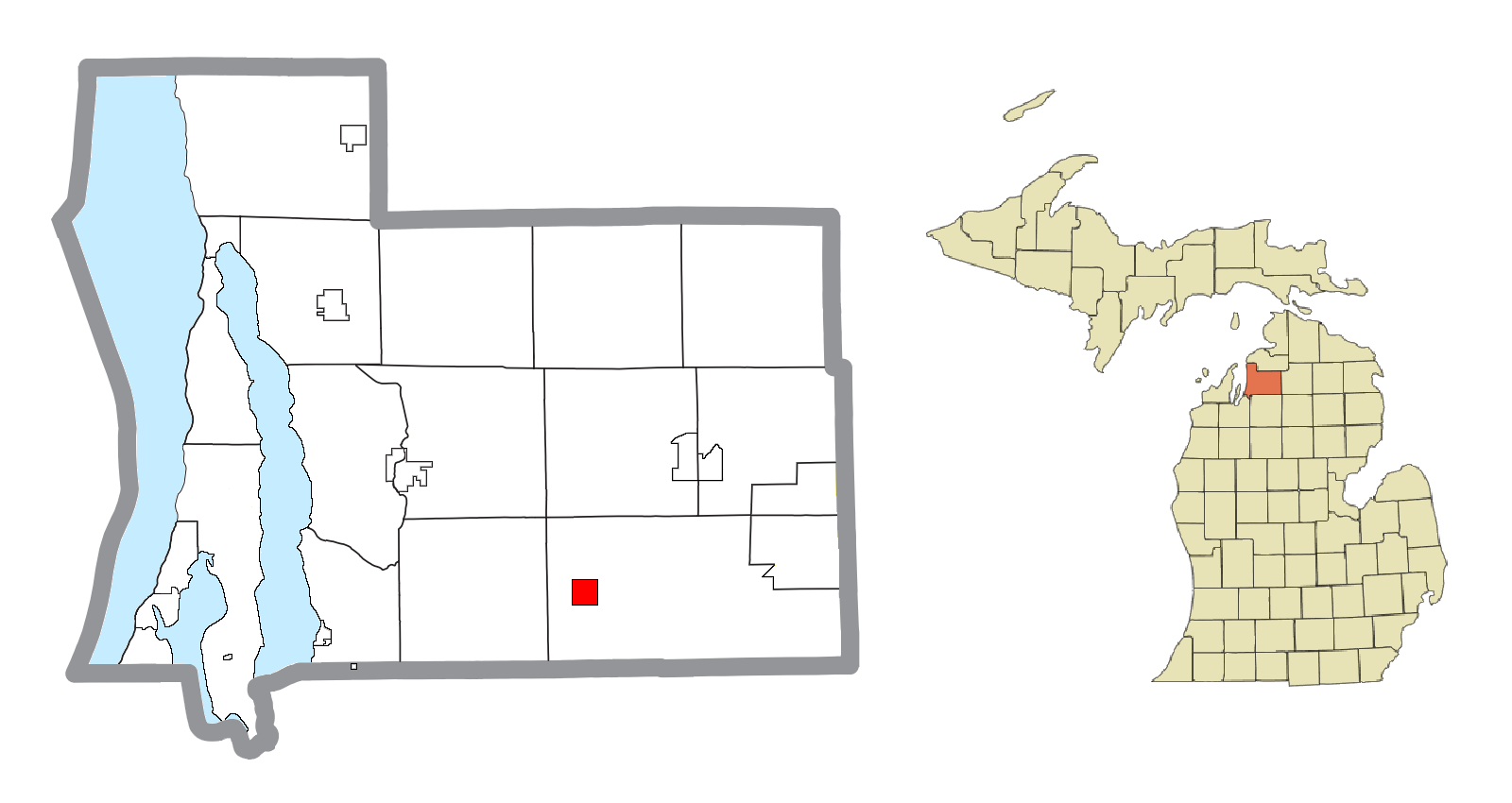
- Location within Antrim County

- Location within the state of Michigan
- Coordinates: 44°54′14″N 85°03′38″W
- Country: United States
- State: Michigan
- County: Antrim
- Township: Mancelona
- Incorporated: 1889
- Named after: Mancelona Andress

Government
  - Type: Village council
  - President: Mike Allison
  - Clerk: Maureen Naumcheff

Area
  - Total: 1.00 sq mi (2.60 km^{2})
  - Land: 1.00 sq mi (2.60 km^{2})
  - Water: 0 sq mi (0.00 km^{2})
- Elevation: 1,125 ft (343 m)

Population (2020)
  - Total: 1,344
  - Density: 1,339.9/sq mi (517.35/km^{2})
- Time zone: UTC-5 (Eastern (EST))
  - Summer (DST): UTC-4 (EDT)
- ZIP code(s): 49659
- Area code: 231
- FIPS code: 26-50620
- GNIS feature ID: 0631374
- Website: www.villageofmancelona.org

Mancelona (/mænˌsəˈloʊnə/ man-sə-LOW-nə) is a village in the Northern Lower Peninsula of the U.S. state of Michigan. Part of Mancelona Township, the village is located within Antrim County. Its population was 1,344 at the 2020 census.

== History ==
In 1869, Perry Andress established a homestead in the area, naming it after his daughter, Mancelona Andress. Two years later, the Township of Mancelona was established, and named after her as well. In 1872, an extension of the Grand Rapids and Indiana Railroad was extended through the area, and a station called Mancelona was established.

== Geography ==
According to the United States Census Bureau, the village has a total area of 1.00 square mile (2.59 km^{2}), all of it land. The village is located at 44°54′08″N 85°03′39″W.

Mancelona is known for its close proximity to many bodies of water, including the Jordan River, and the Elk River Chain of Lakes Watershed, especially Torch Lake.

== Demographics ==
Historical population
Census	Pop.	Note	%±
1880	105		—
1890	1,205		1,047.6%
1900	1,226		1.7%
1910	1,200		−2.1%
1920	1,214		1.2%
1930	1,143		−5.8%
1940	1,173		2.6%
1950	1,000		−14.7%
1960	1,141		14.1%
1970	1,255		10.0%
1980	1,432		14.1%
1990	1,370		−4.3%
2000	1,408		2.8%
2010	1,390		−1.3%
2020	1,344		−3.3%
U.S. Decennial Census

=== 2010 census ===
As of the census of 2010, there were 1,390 people, 518 households, and 349 families residing in the village. The population density was 1,390.0 inhabitants per square mile (536.7/km^{2}). There were 594 housing units at an average density of 594.0 per square mile (229.3/km^{2}). The racial makeup of the village was 95.1% White, 1.1% Native American, and 3.7% from two or more races. Hispanic or Latino people of any race were 0.9% of the population.

There were 518 households, of which 40.2% had children under the age of 18 living with them, 40.9% were married couples living together, 19.3% had a female householder, 7.1% had a male householder, and 32.6% were other-families. 25.9% of all households were made up of individuals, and 10.4% had someone living alone who was 65 years of age or older. The average household size was 2.68 and the average family size was 3.19.

The median age in the village was 34.1 years. 29.6% of residents were under the age of 18; 10.2% were between the ages of 18 and 24; 24.9% were from 25 to 44; 23.2% were from 45 to 64; and 12.1% were 65 years of age or older. The gender makeup of the village was 47.3% male and 52.7% female.

=== 2000 census ===
As of the census of 2000, there were 1,408 people, 535 households, and 367 families residing in the village. The population density was 1,420.7 inhabitants per square mile (548.5/km^{2}). There were 582 housing units at an average density of 587.3 per square mile (226.8/km^{2}). The racial makeup of the village was 95.60% White, 0.36% African American, 1.35% Native American, 0.07% Asian, 0.71% from other races, and 1.92% from two or more races. Hispanic or Latino of any race were 2.20% of the population.

There were 535 households, out of which 36.1% had children under the age of 18 living with them, 46.7% were married couples living together, 15.1% had a female householder with no husband present, and 31.4% were non-families. 25.6% of all households were made up of individuals, and 13.8% had someone living alone who was 65 years of age or older. The average household size was 2.62 and the average family size was 3.07.

In the village, the population was spread out, with 28.9% under the age of 18, 9.9% from 18 to 24, 28.2% from 25 to 44, 21.2% from 45 to 64, and 11.8% who were 65 years of age or older. The median age was 33 years. For every 100 females, there were 89.0 males. For every 100 females age 18 and over, there were 87.1 males.

The median income for a household in the village was $29,583, and the median income for a family was $32,375. Males had a median income of $25,313 versus $18,917 for females.

== Education ==
Mancelona Public Schools operates public schools. Mancelona teams are known as the "Ironmen".

== Major highways ==
- US 131 traverses the town southwest to northeast. Northeast of Mancelona, the highway continues through the towns of Alba, Boyne Falls, and Walloon Lake, before ending at US 31 in downtown Petoskey. To the southwest, US 131 runs through Kalkaska and Fife Lake before turning due south and converting to a freeway, continuing south toward Cadillac, Grand Rapids, and Kalamazoo.
- M-66 is another north–south highway running through Mancelona. To the north, M-66 runs through East Jordan before terminating at Charlevoix. To the south, M-66 runs with US 131 to Kalkaska, but continues south to the east of US 131, running through smaller communities like Lake City, Marion, and eventually, Ionia and Sturgis.
- M-88 is an east–west highway that has its eastern terminus in downtown Mancelona. M-88 is entirely within Antrim County, running through the communities of Bellaire and Central Lake before terminating at US 31 in Eastport.
- C-38 is an east–west county-designated highway that serves as an eastward extension of M-88. East of Mancelona, C-38 enters Otsego County.
