= Echo Township, Michigan =

- Civil township
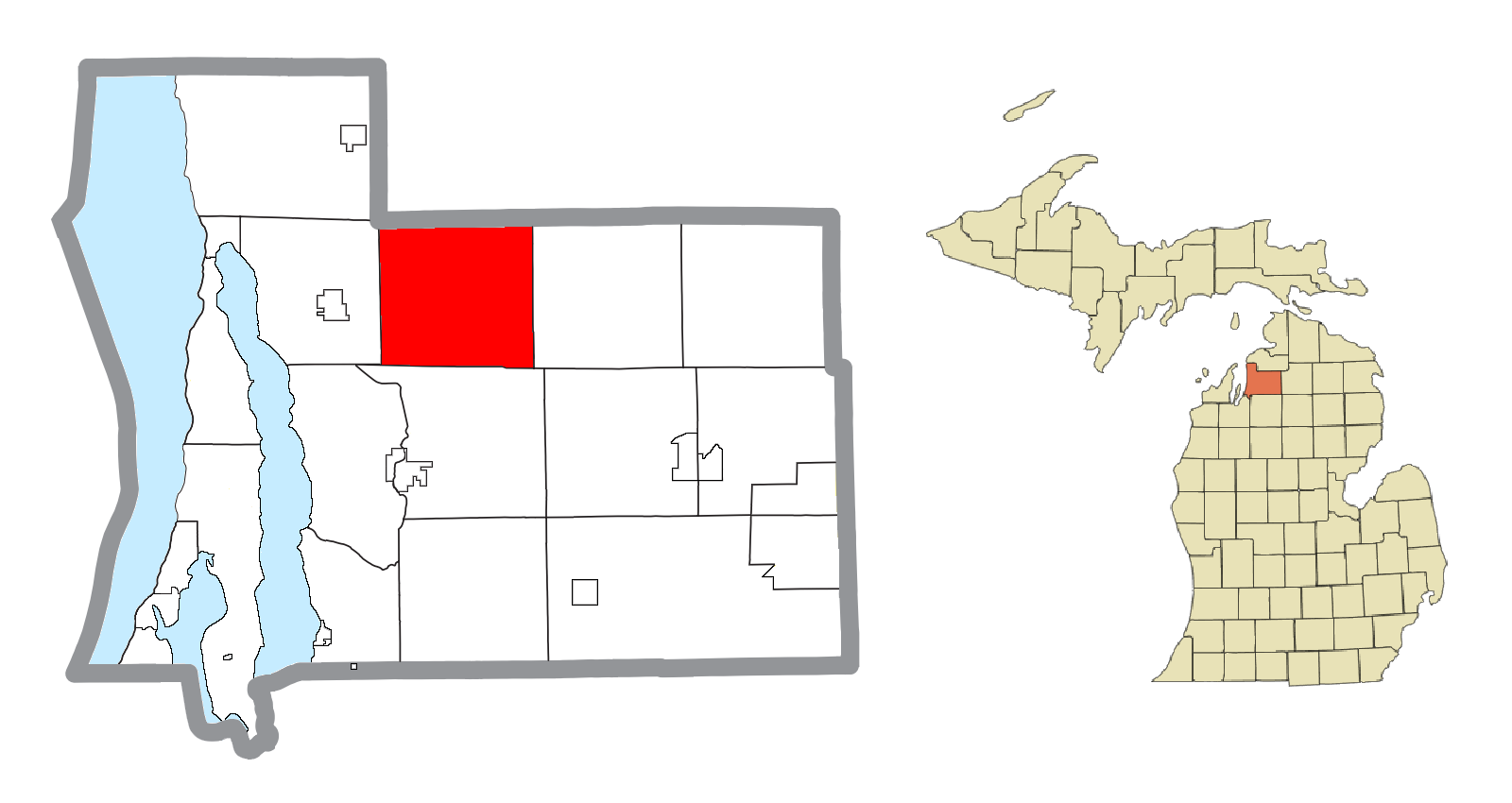
- Location within Antrim County

- Location within the state of Michigan Echo Township (the United States)
- Coordinates: 45°04′58″N 85°09′29″W
- Country: United States
- State: Michigan
- County: Antrim
- Organized: March 20, 1875

Government
  - Supervisor: William Derenzy
  - Clerk: Carolyn Barnett

Area
  - Total: 35.4 sq mi (91.6 km^{2})
  - Land: 34.9 sq mi (90.3 km^{2})
  - Water: 0.50 sq mi (1.3 km^{2})
- Elevation: 961 ft (293 m)

Population (2020)
  - Total: 952
  - Density: 27.3/sq mi (10.5/km^{2})
- Time zone: UTC-5 (Eastern (EST))
  - Summer (DST): UTC-4 (EDT)
- ZIP code(s): 49622 (Central Lake); 49727 (East Jordan)
- Area code: 231
- FIPS code: 26-24640
- GNIS feature ID: 1626213
- Website: https://echotownship.org/

Echo Township is a civil township of Antrim County in the U.S. state of Michigan.

Echo Township is located in Michigan with a population of 943. Echo Township is in Antrim County. Living in Echo Township offers residents a suburban rural mix feel and most residents own their homes. Many families and retirees live in Echo Township and residents tend to be conservative.

As of the 2020 census, the township population was 952. As of the 2023 census, there were 943 people residing in the township. The median age was 46.6 years and the median income $37,938.

== Communities ==
Pleasant Valley is an unincorporated community in the township at 45°03′28″N 85°09′37″W.

== Geography ==
According to the United States Census Bureau, the township has a total area of 35.4 square miles (91.6 km^{2}), of which 34.9 square miles (90.3 km^{2}) is land and 0.50 square miles (1.3 km^{2}), or 1.45%, is water.

== Demographics ==
As of the census of 2000, there were 928 people, 355 households, and 272 families residing in the township. The population density was 26.6 inhabitants per square mile (10.3/km^{2}). There were 522 housing units at an average density of 15.0 per square mile (5.8/km^{2}). The racial makeup of the township was 97.41% White, 0.11% African American, 1.08% Native American, and 1.40% from two or more races. Hispanic or Latino of any race were 0.22% of the population.

There were 355 households, out of which 30.7% had children under the age of 18 living with them, 66.5% were married couples living together, 5.6% had a female householder with no husband present, and 23.1% were non-families. 20.3% of all households were made up of individuals, and 7.9% had someone living alone who was 65 years of age or older. The average household size was 2.61 and the average family size was 2.95.

In the township the population was spread out, with 26.1% under the age of 18, 7.0% from 18 to 24, 26.9% from 25 to 44, 27.5% from 45 to 64, and 12.5% who were 65 years of age or older. The median age was 38 years. For every 100 females, there were 102.2 males. For every 100 females age 18 and over, there were 100.6 males.

The median income for a household in the township was $36,406, and the median income for a family was $40,500. Males had a median income of $31,193 versus $20,272 for females. The per capita income for the township was $15,427. About 7.0% of families and 8.6% of the population were below the poverty line, including 8.6% of those under age 18 and 11.5% of those age 65 or over.
