= Star Township, Michigan =

- Civil township
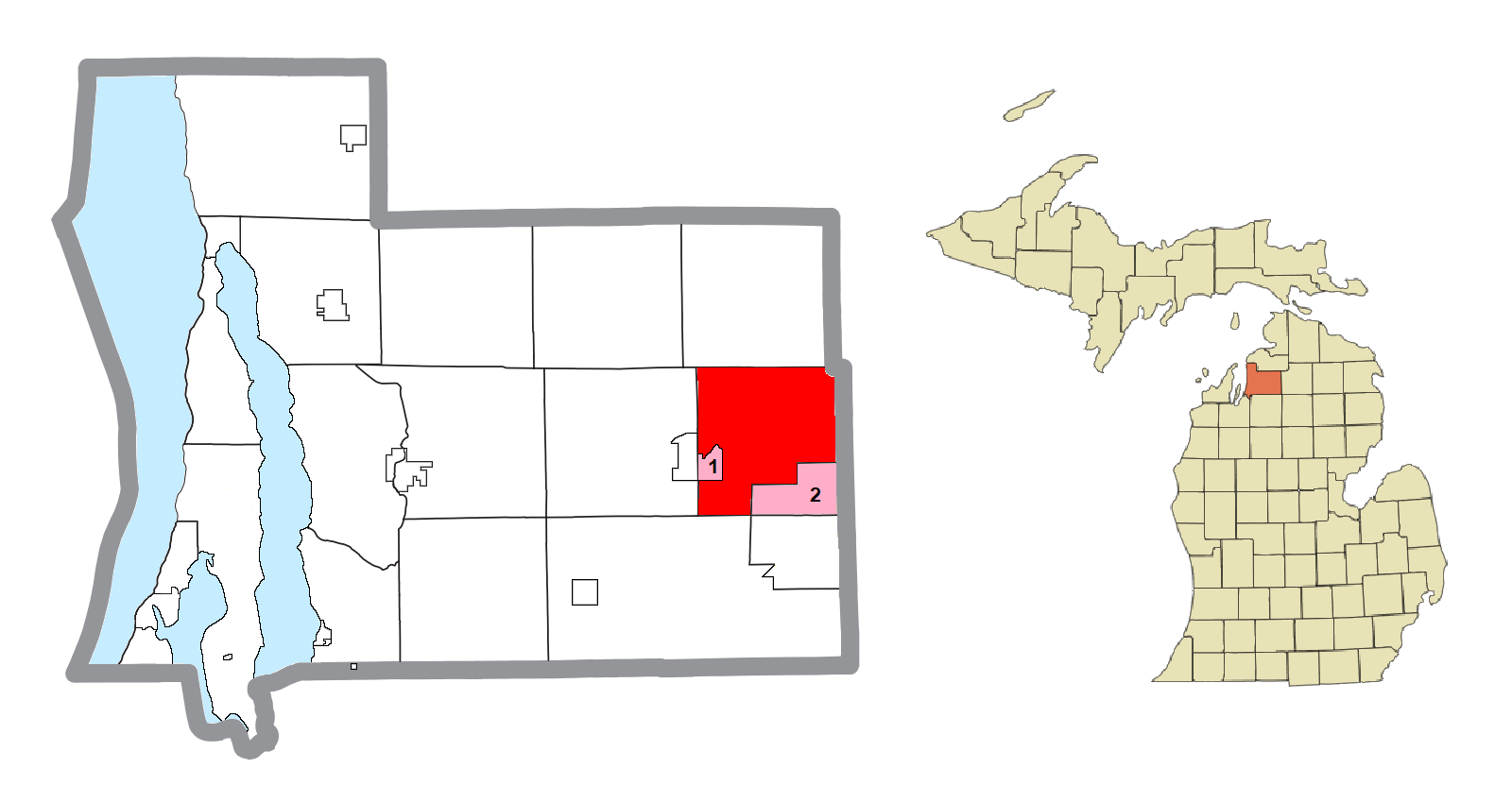
- Location within Antrim County and portions of the administered communities of Alba (1) and Lakes of the North (2)

- Location within the state of Michigan Star Township (the United States)
- Coordinates: 44°57′38″N 84°54′05″W
- Country: United States
- State: Michigan
- County: Antrim
- Organized: 1881

Government
  - Supervisor: Robert D. Marsh
  - Clerk: Phyllis Hoogerhyde
  - Treasurer: Tammi Fuller

Area
  - Total: 34.5 sq mi (89.3 km^{2})
  - Land: 34.4 sq mi (89.1 km^{2})
  - Water: 0.077 sq mi (0.2 km^{2})
- Elevation: 1,257 ft (383 m)

Population (2020)
  - Total: 1,028
  - Density: 29.9/sq mi (11.5/km^{2})
- Time zone: UTC-5 (Eastern (EST))
  - Summer (DST): UTC-4 (EDT)
- ZIP code(s): 49730 (Elmira)
- Area code: 231
- FIPS code: 26-76260
- GNIS feature ID: 1627123
- Website: Official website

Star Township is a civil township of Antrim County in the U.S. state of Michigan. The population was 1,028 at the 2020 census.

== Communities ==
- Alba is an unincorporated community and census-designated place located partially within Star Township. The western portion of the community extends into Chestonia Township.
- Lakes of the North is an unincorporated community and census-designated place located partially within Star Township. The southern portion of the community extends into Mancelona Township.

== Geography ==
According to the United States Census Bureau, the township has a total area of 34.5 square miles (89.3 km^{2}), of which 34.4 square miles (89.1 km^{2}) is land and 0.077 square miles (0.2 km^{2}), or 0.21%, is water.

== Demographics ==
As of the census of 2000, there were 745 people, 295 households, and 220 families residing in the township. The population density was 21.8 per square mile (8.4/km^{2}). There were 532 housing units at an average density of 15.6 per square mile (6.0/km^{2}). The racial makeup of the township was 97.72% White, 1.21% Native American, 0.27% from other races, and 0.81% from two or more races. Hispanic or Latino of any race were 0.94% of the population.

There were 295 households, out of which 27.5% had children under the age of 18 living with them, 66.8% were married couples living together, 4.7% had a female householder with no husband present, and 25.4% were non-families. 21.4% of all households were made up of individuals, and 9.8% had someone living alone who was 65 years of age or older. The average household size was 2.53 and the average family size was 2.93.

In the township the population was spread out, with 24.0% under the age of 18, 8.5% from 18 to 24, 25.2% from 25 to 44, 25.6% from 45 to 64, and 16.6% who were 65 years of age or older. The median age was 38 years. For every 100 females, there were 99.2 males. For every 100 females age 18 and over, there were 96.5 males.

The median income for a household in the township was $37,500, and the median income for a family was $41,618. Males had a median income of $32,321 versus $17,917 for females. The per capita income for the township was $17,896. About 4.5% of families and 6.7% of the population were below the poverty line, including 12.8% of those under age 18 and 2.6% of those age 65 or over.
