= Custer Township, Antrim County, Michigan =

Custer Township, Michigan
- Civil township
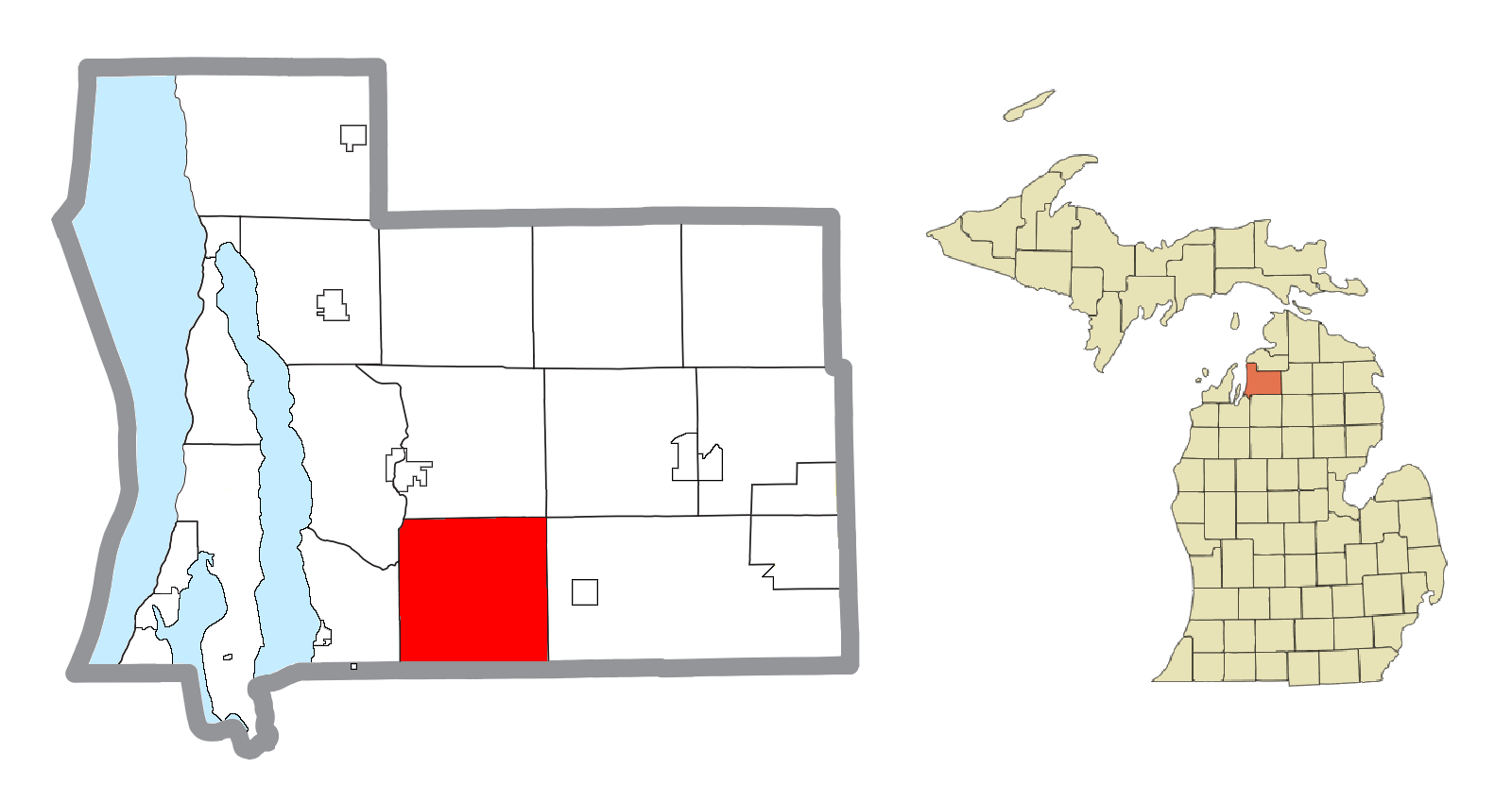
- Location within Antrim County

- Location within the state of Michigan Custer Township (the United States)
- Coordinates: 44°55′14″N 85°09′30″W
- Country: United States
- State: Michigan
- County: Antrim

Government
  - Supervisor: Roxann Flake
  - Clerk: Stacy Simon

Area
  - Total: 35.2 sq mi (91.2 km^{2})
  - Land: 34.7 sq mi (89.9 km^{2})
  - Water: 0.50 sq mi (1.3 km^{2})
- Elevation: 892 ft (272 m)

Population (2020)
  - Total: 1,150
  - Density: 33.1/sq mi (12.8/km^{2})
- Time zone: UTC-5 (Eastern (EST))
  - Summer (DST): UTC-4 (EDT)
- ZIP code(s): 49612 (Alden); 49615 (Bellaire); 49659 (Mancelona)
- Area code: 231
- FIPS code: 26-19400
- GNIS feature ID: 1626151
- Website: Official website

Custer Township is a civil township of Antrim County in the U.S. state of Michigan. The population was 1,150 at the 2020 census.

== Geography ==
According to the United States Census Bureau, the township has a total area of 35.2 square miles (91.2 km^{2}), of which 34.7 square miles (89.9 km^{2}) is land and 0.50 square miles (1.3 km^{2}), or 1.40%, is water.

== Demographics ==
As of the census of 2000, there were 988 people, 397 households, and 294 families residing in the township. The population density was 28.4 inhabitants per square mile (11.0/km^{2}). There were 914 housing units at an average density of 26.3 per square mile (10.2/km^{2}). The racial makeup of the township was 97.06% White, 0.51% Native American, 0.20% Asian, 0.40% Pacific Islander, and 1.82% from two or more races. Hispanic or Latino of any race were 0.51% of the population.

There were 397 households, out of which 29.0% had children under the age of 18 living with them, 64.5% were married couples living together, 6.3% had a female householder with no husband present, and 25.7% were non-families. 21.9% of all households were made up of individuals, and 9.1% had someone living alone who was 65 years of age or older. The average household size was 2.49 and the average family size was 2.90.

In the township, the population was spread out, with 23.5% under the age of 18, 4.6% from 18 to 24, 25.0% from 25 to 44, 31.4% from 45 to 64, and 15.6% who were 65 years of age or older. The median age was 43 years. For every 100 females, there were 100.8 males. For every 100 females age 18 and over, there were 101.6 males.

The median income for a household in the township was $41,645, and the median income for a family was $46,458. Males had a median income of $32,283 versus $22,356 for females. The per capita income for the township was $19,643. About 4.1% of families and 6.3% of the population were below the poverty line, including 10.0% of those under age 18 and 8.3% of those age 65 or over.
