= Kearney Township, Michigan =

- Civil township
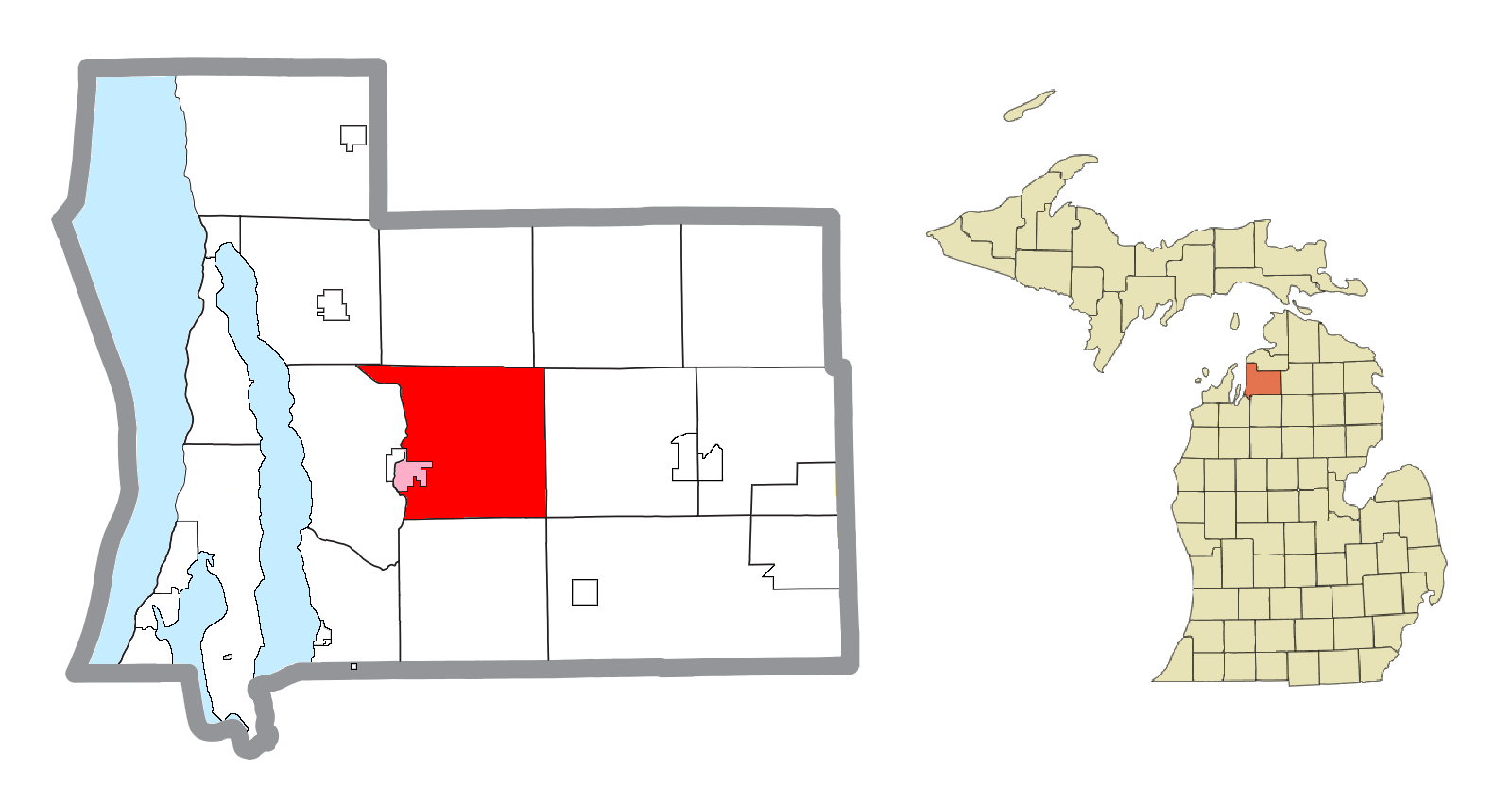
- Location within Antrim County (red) and an administered portion of the Bellaire village (pink)

- Location within the state of Michigan Kearney Township (the United States)
- Coordinates: 44°58′33″N 85°10′26″W
- Country: United States
- State: Michigan
- County: Antrim

Government
  - Supervisor: Ed Niepoth
  - Clerk: Michelle D. Valuet
  - Treasurer: Joyce Hagood

Area
  - Total: 35.3 sq mi (91.3 km^{2})
  - Land: 34.2 sq mi (88.7 km^{2})
  - Water: 1.0 sq mi (2.6 km^{2})
- Elevation: 699 ft (213 m)

Population (2020)
  - Total: 1,780
  - Density: 52.0/sq mi (20.1/km^{2})
- Time zone: UTC-5 (Eastern (EST))
  - Summer (DST): UTC-4 (EDT)
- ZIP code(s): 49615 (Bellaire); 49622 (Central Lake); 49727 (East Jordan)
- Area code: 231
- FIPS code: 26-42400
- GNIS feature ID: 1626553
- Website: kearneytownship.org

Kearney Township is a civil township of Antrim County in the U.S. state of Michigan. The population was 1,780 at the 2020 census. A portion of the village of Bellaire is located within the township.

== Geography ==
According to the United States Census Bureau, the township has a total area of 35.3 square miles (91.3 km^{2}), of which 34.2 square miles (88.7 km^{2}) is land and 1.0 square mile (2.6 km^{2}), or 2.87%, is water.

== Demographics ==
As of the census of 2000, there were 1,764 people, 661 households, and 464 families residing in the township. The population density was 51.5 inhabitants per square mile (19.9/km^{2}). There were 932 housing units at an average density of 27.2 per square mile (10.5/km^{2}). The racial makeup of the township was 97.17% White, 0.28% African American, 0.57% Native American, 0.06% Asian, 0.40% from other races, and 1.53% from two or more races. Hispanic or Latino of any race were 1.59% of the population.

There were 661 households, out of which 32.5% had children under the age of 18 living with them, 54.3% were married couples living together, 11.8% had a female householder with no husband present, and 29.8% were non-families. 25.6% of all households were made up of individuals, and 10.0% had someone living alone who was 65 years of age or older. The average household size was 2.41 and the average family size was 2.89.

In the township the population was spread out, with 24.4% under the age of 18, 7.1% from 18 to 24, 26.9% from 25 to 44, 20.9% from 45 to 64, and 20.7% who were 65 years of age or older. The median age was 40 years. For every 100 females, there were 91.9 males. For every 100 females age 18 and over, there were 89.2 males.

The median income for a household in the township was $36,058, and the median income for a family was $45,677. Males had a median income of $35,391 versus $21,739 for females. The per capita income for the township was $19,106. About 5.8% of families and 8.1% of the population were below the poverty line, including 7.8% of those under age 18 and 11.8% of those age 65 or over.
