= Chestonia Township, Michigan =

- Civil township
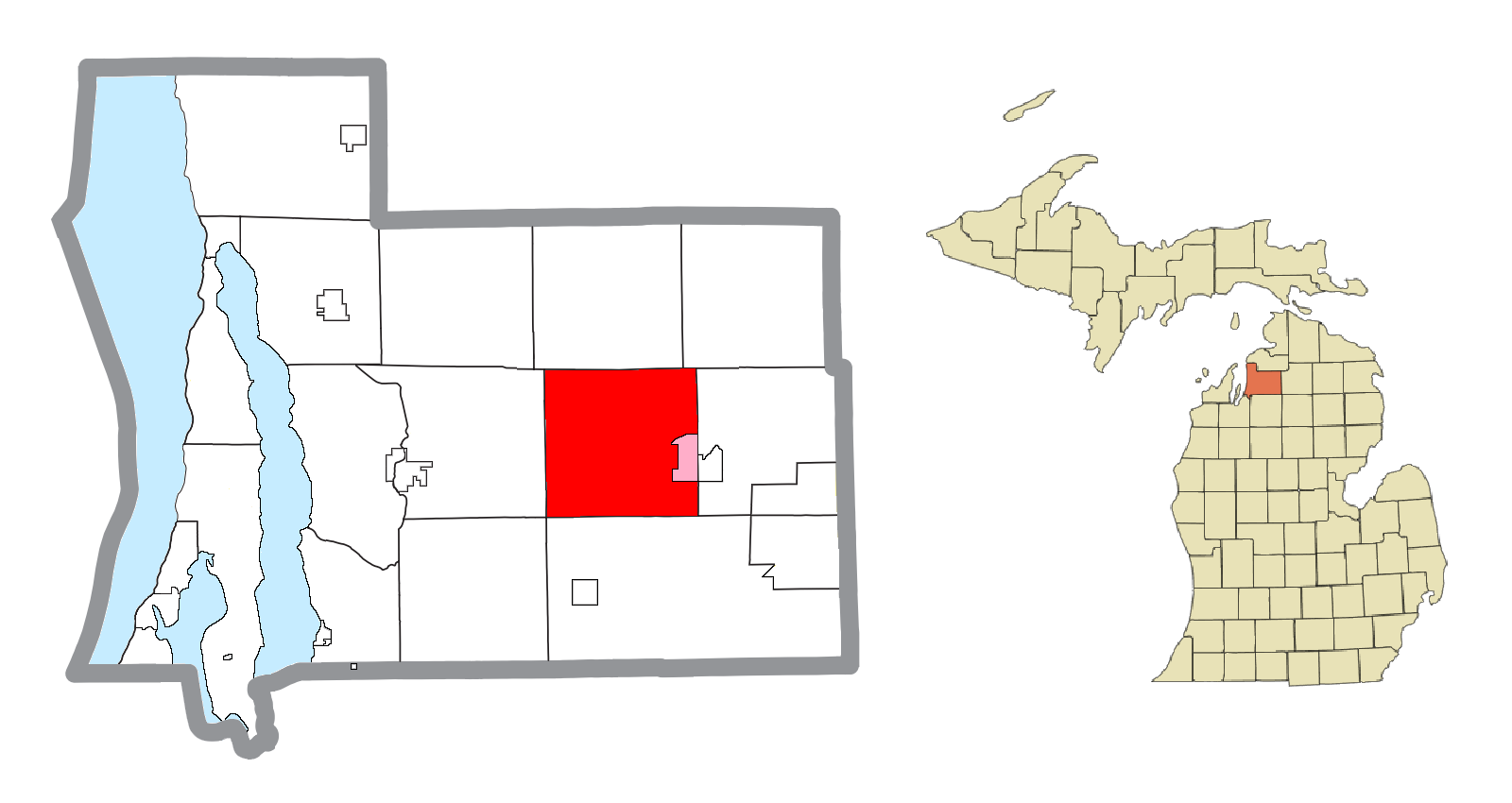
- Location within Antrim County (red) and an administered portion of the Alba community (pink)

- Location within the state of Michigan Chestonia Township (the United States)
- Coordinates: 44°58′32″N 85°02′14″W
- Country: United States
- State: Michigan
- County: Antrim
- Established: 1874

Government
  - Supervisor: Roy A. Wicht
  - Clerk: Nancy J. Shepard
  - Treasurer: Debra Sutherland

Area
  - Total: 35.5 sq mi (92.0 km^{2})
  - Land: 35.3 sq mi (91.4 km^{2})
  - Water: 0.27 sq mi (0.7 km^{2})
- Elevation: 1,004 ft (306 m)

Population (2020)
  - Total: 512
  - Density: 14.5/sq mi (5.60/km^{2})
- Time zone: UTC-5 (Eastern (EST))
  - Summer (DST): UTC-4 (EDT)
- ZIP code(s): 49611 (Alba); 49659 (Mancelona); 49730 (Elmira)
- Area code: 231
- FIPS code: 26-15380
- GNIS feature ID: 1626075

Chestonia Township is a civil township of Antrim County in the U.S. state of Michigan. The population was 512 at the 2020 census.

== Communities ==
- Alba is an unincorporated community and census-designated place located partially within Chestonia Township. The western portion of the community extends into Star Township.

== History ==
Chestonia Township was organized in 1874.

From 1901 to 1932, the junction of the East Jordan and Southern and the Detroit & Charlevoix railroads lay within the township.

== Geography ==
According to the United States Census Bureau, the township has a total area of 35.5 square miles (92.0 km^{2}), of which 35.3 square miles (91.4 km^{2}) is land and 0.27 square miles (0.7 km^{2}), or 0.72%, is water.

== Demographics ==
As of the census of 2000, there were 546 people, 199 households, and 145 families residing in the township. The population density was 15.4 inhabitants per square mile (5.9/km^{2}). There were 309 housing units at an average density of 8.7 per square mile (3.4/km^{2}). The racial makeup of the township was 92.31% White, 0.92% African American, 2.20% Native American, 1.10% Pacific Islander, 0.37% from other races, and 3.11% from two or more races. Hispanic or Latino of any race were 0.55% of the population.

There were 199 households, out of which 34.2% had children under the age of 18 living with them, 58.3% were married couples living together, 10.1% had a female householder with no husband present, and 27.1% were non-families. 22.1% of all households were made up of individuals, and 8.5% had someone living alone who was 65 years of age or older. The average household size was 2.74 and the average family size was 3.17.

In the township the population was spread out, with 28.4% under the age of 18, 8.2% from 18 to 24, 26.6% from 25 to 44, 25.3% from 45 to 64, and 11.5% who were 65 years of age or older. The median age was 35 years. For every 100 females, there were 100.7 males. For every 100 females age 18 and over, there were 102.6 males.

The median income for a household in the township was $37,344, and the median income for a family was $37,656. Males had a median income of $29,500 versus $20,139 for females. The per capita income for the township was $13,094. About 8.5% of families and 12.2% of the population were below the poverty line, including 15.2% of those under age 18 and 16.7% of those age 65 or over.
