= Boyne River (Michigan) =

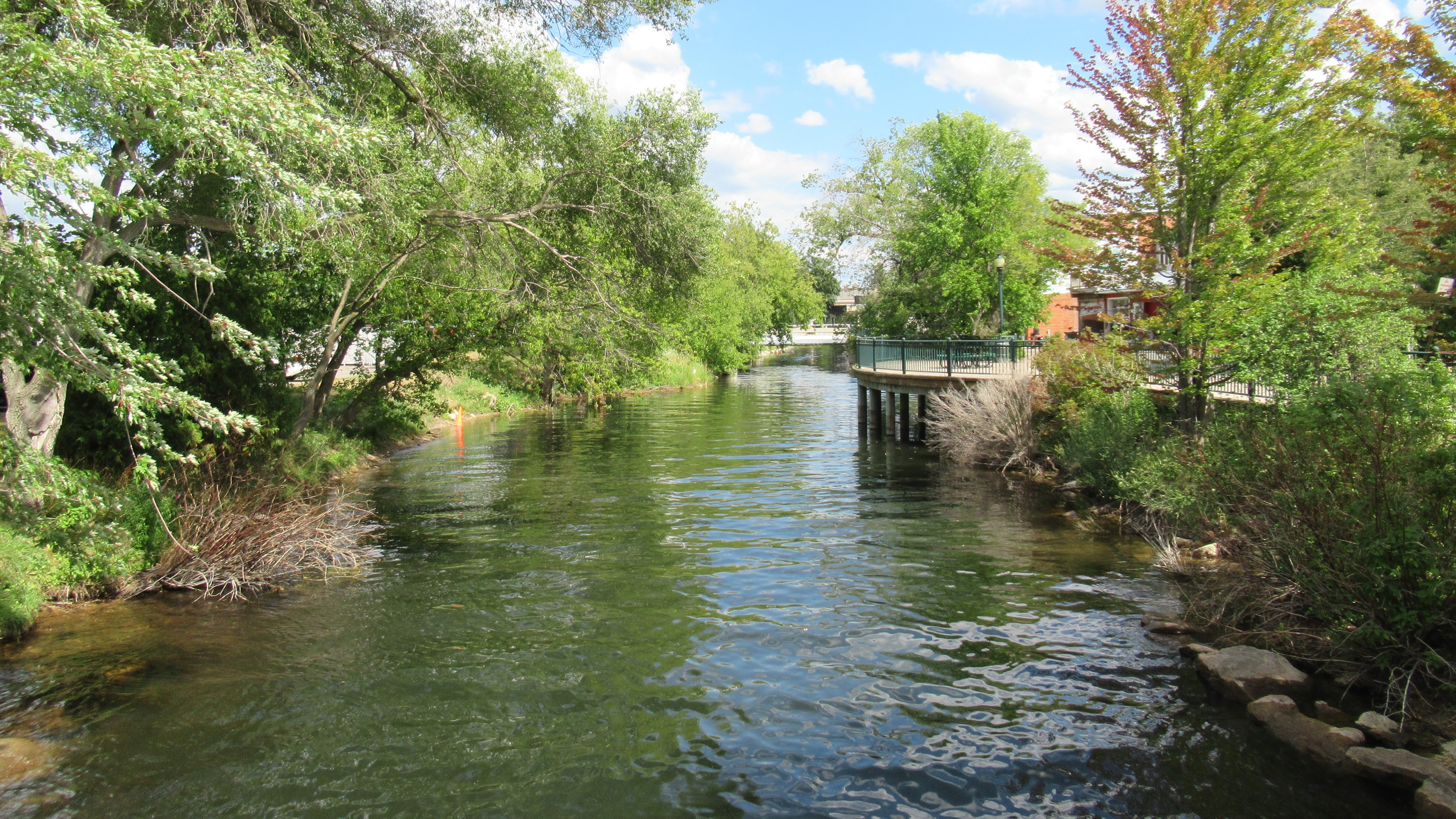
- Near the river mouth in Boyne City

- Location within the state of Michigan

Location
- Country: United States
- State: Michigan

Physical characteristics
- Source
  - location: Boyne Valley Township, Michigan (main branch)
  - coordinates: 45°10′53″N 84°55′12″W
- Mouth
  - location: Lake Charlevoix at Boyne City
  - coordinates: 45°12′53″N 85°00′53″W
- Length: 9.0 km (5.6 mi)
- Basin size: 40,320 acres (163.2 km^{2})

Boyne River is a stream in Northern Michigan, named for the River Boyne in Leinster, Ireland. Together with the north and south branches, the river system has approximately 22 miles (35 km) of mainstream and the water basin drains 40,320 acres (163.2 km^{2}). Boyne River is Lake Charlevoix's second-largest tributary, after the Jordan River.

== Course ==
Boyne River's mainstream is approximately 5.6 miles (9.0 km) long, from the confluence of the north and south branches at 45°10′53″N 84°55′12″W less than a mile northwest of the village of Boyne Falls . The main branch flows northwest through Boyne City into Lake Charlevoix at 45°12′53″N 85°00′53″W.

The North Branch Boyne River is 5.9 miles (9.5 km) long and rises in Hudson Township in eastern Charlevoix County at 45°10′34″N 84°48′52″W. The South Branch Boyne River is 10.5 miles (16.9 km) long and rises in Elmira Township in northwest Otsego County at 45°05′10″N 84°48′42″W. The South Branch flows northwest across the northeast corner of Warner Township in Antrim County.

=== Impoundments ===
The river system has three major impoundments: the Boyne City Mill Pond, a reservoir formed by a hydroelectric dam, and the Boyne River Pond.

==== The Boyne City Mill Pond ====
The Boyne City Mill Pond is in Boyne City, less than a mile from the river's mouth. The Mill Pond is not a true impoundment resulting from a dam on the river, but affects the river similarly in that it collects sediments and provides a large surface area that tends to raise the water temperature during the summer months. The pond is called "Little Lake" in a 1901 plat book.

==== Reservoir ====
A hydroelectric dam owned by Boyne Resorts forms a reservoir at coordinates 45°11′38″N 84°56′53″W (southwest of Addis Road and southeast of Drury Lane). The dam was built circa 1906 to provide power to nearby towns. The Boyne River Power Company merged with many other small power providers in West Michigan to form the Michigan Public Service Company in 1927. Consumers Energy bought that company in 1950. They continued to operate the power plant until October 12, 1962, after which the generating equipment was removed and the dam. They sold the buildings and land surrounding the reservoir to the Boyne Mountain Lodge in 1963. In 1982, the Boyne Mountain Resort received a license to operate a 250-kilowatt hydroelectric generator using the existing dam and 80-acre (0.32 km^{2}) reservoir.

==== The Boyne River Pond ====
The Boyne River Pond is located on the South Branch near Boyne Falls (at coordinates 45°10′09″N 84°55′05″W). The dam was built before 1900; the water flow powered a saw mill and grist mill. the M-75 highway crosses the river over the dam.

== Tributaries ==
- (right) Forest Lake, identified as Mud Lake in a 1901 plat book
- (left) North Branch Boyne River
  - (left) Schoolhouse Creek
  - (right) Cramer Creek
  - (right) Licks Creek
  - (right) Kuznick Creek
- (right) South Branch Boyne River
  - (right) Moyer Creek

== Geology and ecology ==
The soils surrounding Boyne River's headwaters are primarily composed of a Kalkaska-Leelanau association (a mixture of Kalkaska and Leelanau sands). These soils tend to form steep riverbanks. Among the fish species living in Boyne River are chinook salmon, walleye, brook trout, brown trout, and rainbow trout.

== Drainage basin ==
The Boyne River system drains all or portions of the following cities, townships, and villages:

- Antrim County
  - Warner Township
- Charlevoix County
  - Boyne Valley Township
  - Evangeline Township
  - Hudson Township
  - Melrose Township
  - Wilson Township
- Otsego County
  - Elmira Township
  - Hayes Township
