= Elmira, Michigan =

- Unincorporated community
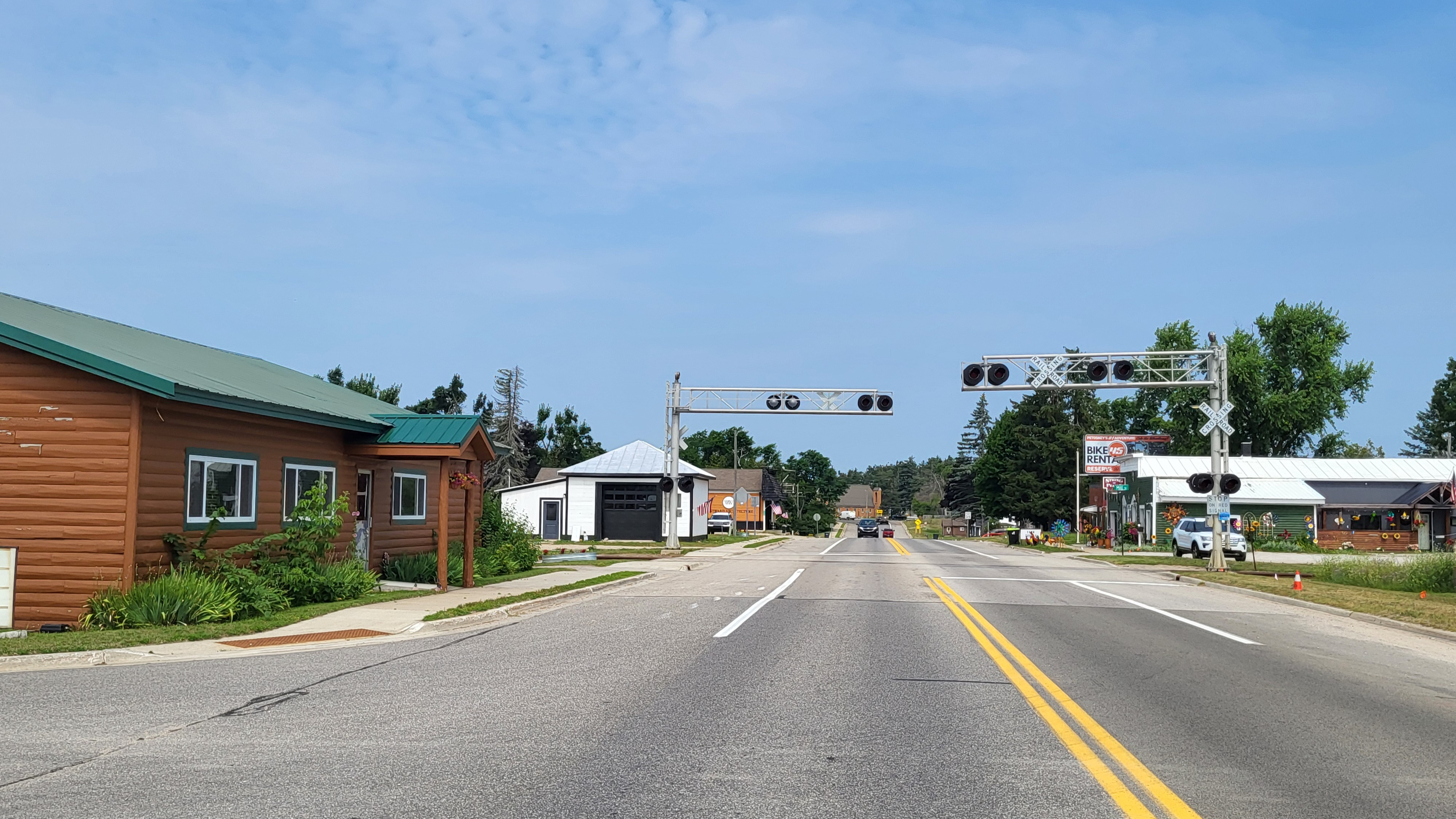
- Looking northwest along M-32
- Nickname: "The Potato Capital"
- Location within the state of Michigan Location within the United States
- Coordinates: 45°03′52″N 84°51′22″W
- Country: United States
- State: Michigan
- Counties: Antrim and Otsego
- Townships: Elmira and Warner
- Settled: 1876
- Elevation: 1,243 ft (379 m)
- Time zone: UTC-5 (Eastern (EST))
  - Summer (DST): UTC-4 (EDT)
- ZIP code(s): 49730
- Area code: 231
- GNIS feature ID: 625524

Elmira (/ɛlˈmaɪrə/ el-MY-rə) is an unincorporated community in the U.S. state of Michigan. Located along M-32, the community is on the county line between Warner Township in Antrim County to the west and Elmira Township in Otsego County to the east.

As an unincorporated community, Elmira has no legally defined boundaries or population statistics of its own but does have its own post office with the 49730 ZIP Code.

== Geography ==
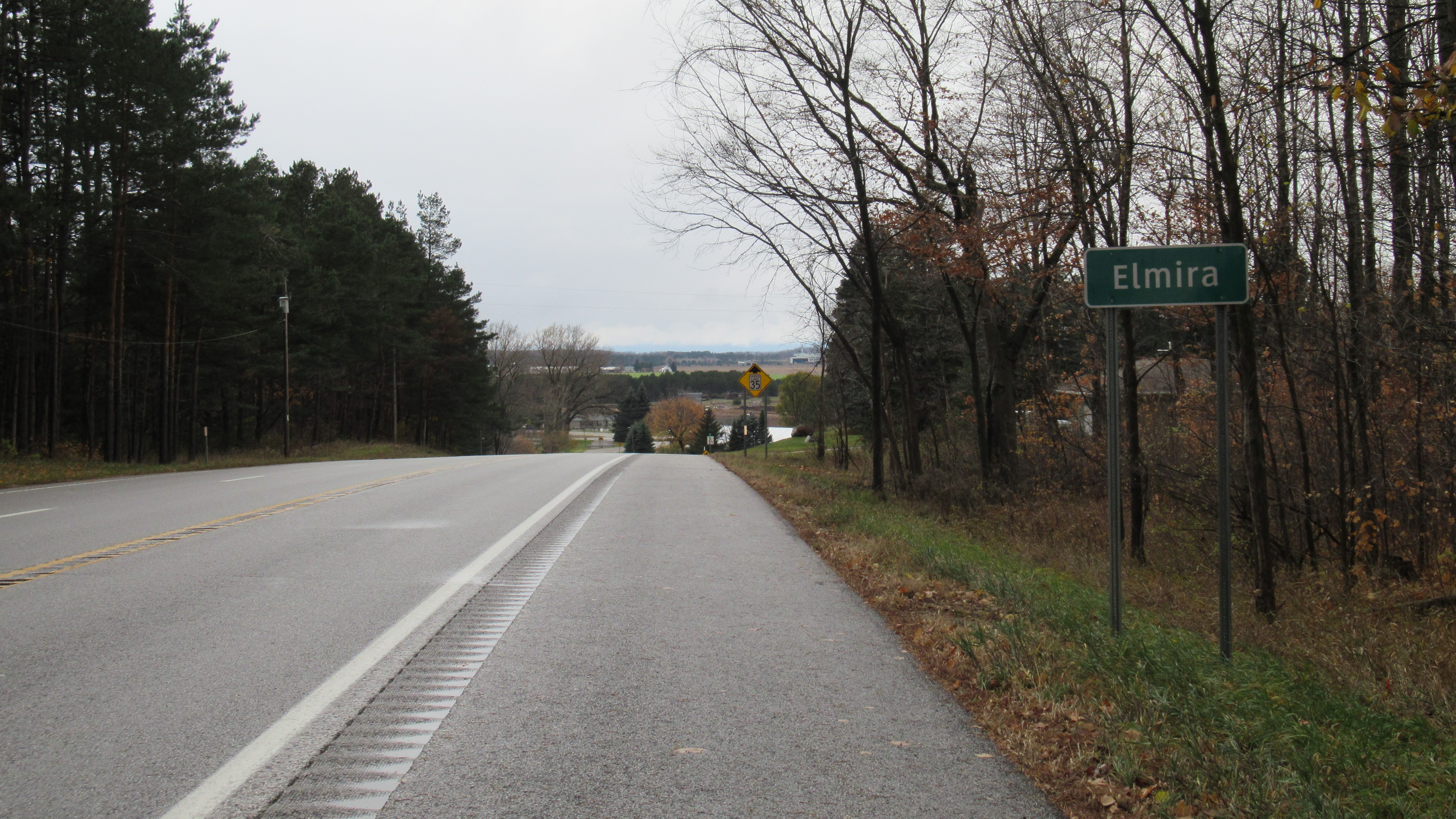
Road signage along M-32

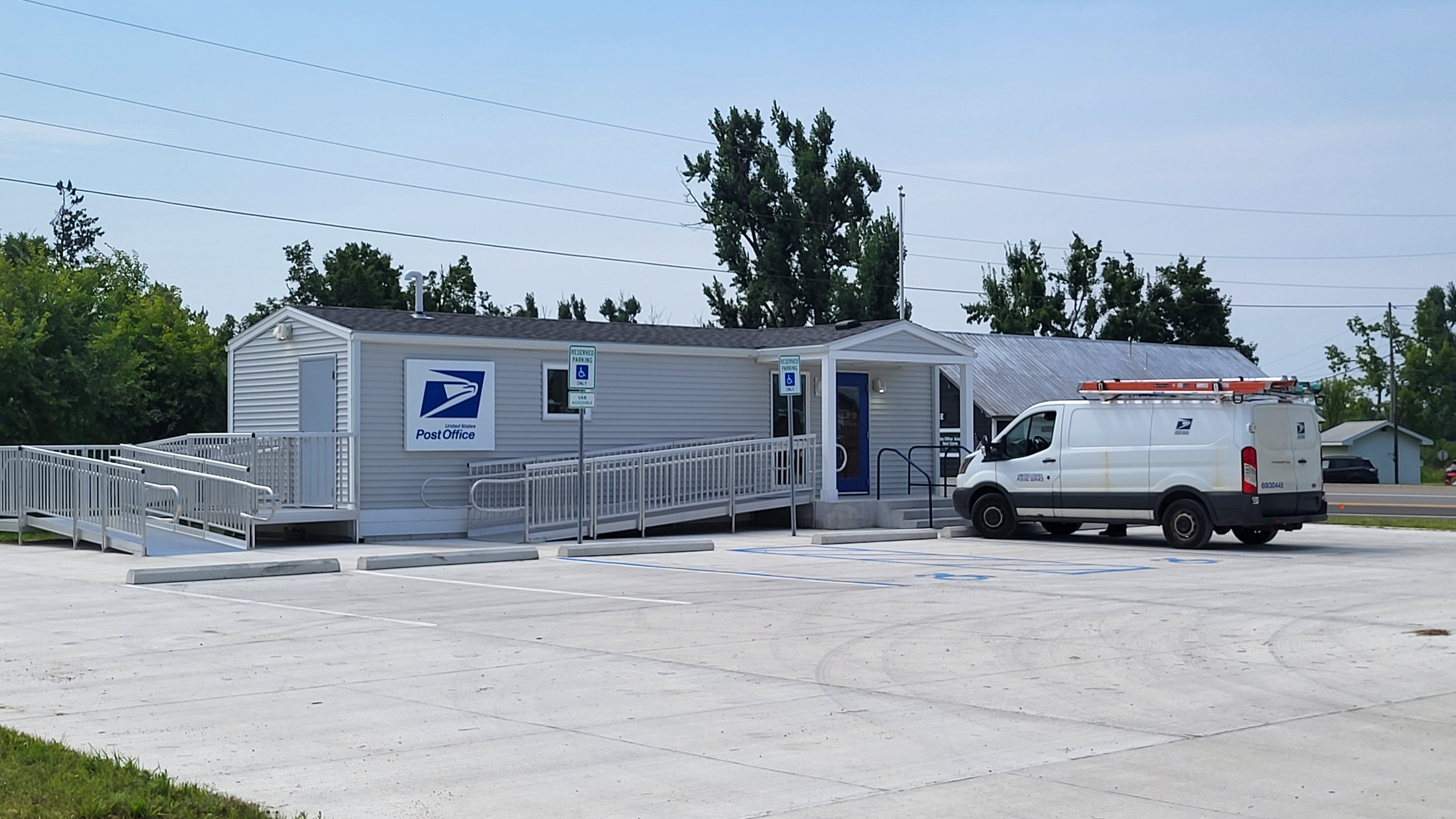
U.S. Post Office in Elmira

The rural community of Elmira is located within the Northern Michigan region about 4.0 miles (6.4 km) north of the 45th parallel. The community is located within Antrim County and Otsego County. Most of the community is within Elmira Township in Otsego County with some development extending west into Warner Township within Antrim County. The community is located about 11 miles (18 km) northwest of the city of Gaylord. Elmira sits at an elevation of 1,243 feet (379 m) above sea level. Some areas surrounding the community are included in the Gaylord unit of the Mackinaw State Forest.

Elmira is centered along M-32 (also known locally as Underwood Avenue) about 1.5 miles (2.4 km) east of U.S. Route 131. F-41, known locally as Alba Road, is a county-designated highway that runs just south of the community. In addition to Gaylord, other nearby communities include Alba and Lakes of the North to the southwest, Boyne Falls to the north, and Vanderbilt to the northeast.

Elmira contained one of five post offices in Otsego County, along with Gaylord, Johannesburg, Vanderbilt, and Waters. The Elmira 49730 ZIP Code serves a large area that includes the western portion of Elmira Township and smaller western portions of Hayes Township within Otsego County. Within Antrim County, the ZIP Code serves the southeastern portion of Warner Township, most of Star Township, a very small northern portion of Mancelona Township, and a very small eastern portion of Chestonia Township. The Elmira ZIP Code also serves the southern portion of Hudson Township to the north in Charlevoix County.

The community is served by Gaylord Community Schools, which is located to the southeast in Gaylord but also extends its boundaries into Warner Township within Antrim County. The community contains two township offices in their respective municipalities. The Warner Township Hall is located at 2434 Ray Street. The Elmira Township Hall is located at 2035 Mt. Jack Road. The Elmira Township Hall contains the volunteer Elmira–Warner Fire Department, which serves the surrounding area.

== History ==
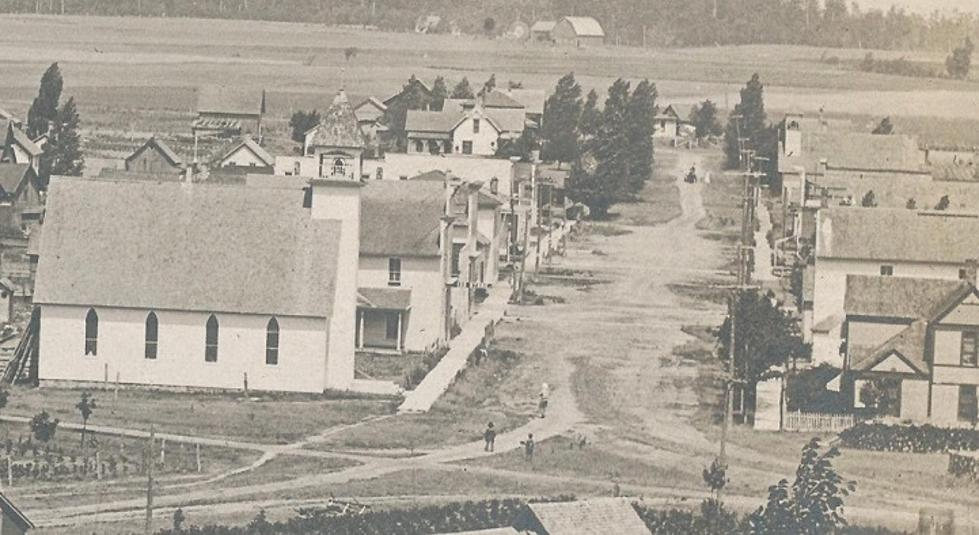
Historic image of Elmira in 1910

In 1873, the Grand Rapids and Indiana Railroad began building railway lines into Northern Michigan. By 1876, a few buildings and a store were built in the area, and William Hartwell purchased 40 acres (16 ha) of land along the railroad the following year. The new community was platted under the name "Windsor" in 1880.

A railway station called the Elmira Station was soon built. It served as a stopover in the railway line that eventually extended north to Mackinaw City. The Boyne City, Gaylord, and Alpena Railroad intersected with the Grand Rapids and Indiana Railroad about 2.0 miles (3.2 km) north of the community. This junction, known as North Elmira, served as an overhead crossing for the two railway lines. By 1892, Elmira had a population of around 400 and included four sawmills, two hotels, five stores, four saloons, a church, and a school. A post office was first established in the community on September 3, 1897, under the name Elmira with William Hartman serving as the first postmaster. The exact reason for the name change from Windsor to Elmira is unknown. Elmira may have received its name from Elmira Eldridge, one of the pioneer women of the community.

In 1919, the first route of M-32 was commissioned and ran through Elmira, providing road access to Gaylord. By this time, the lumber industry declined, and many residents and businesses left the area. The remaining residents instead turned their focus toward potato farming, in which the area had a viable climate and soil for farming. Many farms and warehouses were devoted to potato farming, which earned the community the nickname of "The Potato Capital" due to its high production of potatoes by 1930. Potato farming remains a major industry for the surrounding area.

The railway line continues to run through the community of Elmira and is now operated by Great Lakes Central Railroad, which runs from Petoskey to Ann Arbor. There is no longer a train station in Elmira, and the Boyne City Railroad that was located to the north has been removed, although the original concrete supports of the North Elmira Station still stand. The Elmira post office, which was first established in 1897, was located at 8846 M-32. The office remained in continuous operation until a structural fire forced the closure of the post office on October 13, 2020. A late-night electrical fire destroyed the interior of the structure, although all mail stored at the facility was saved and taken to the Gaylord post office for prompt delivery. The structure remains standing but is vacant, and all mail service was now handled through neighboring post offices.

In April 2022, the U.S. Postal Service decided to keep the Elmira office and ZIP Code active until the location of a new post office building can be determined. In the meantime, mail services in Elmira continue to be handled by the Gaylord post office. In the summer of 2026, a new post office was constructed at the corner of Webster and M-32 just south of the original post office, although this office is not fully operational as of August 2026.

The Saint Thomas Cemetery (also referred to as the Elmira Cemetery) is located along the railway just north of the community on Webster Road.
