= Hudson Township, Charlevoix County, Michigan =

Hudson Township, Michigan
- Civil township
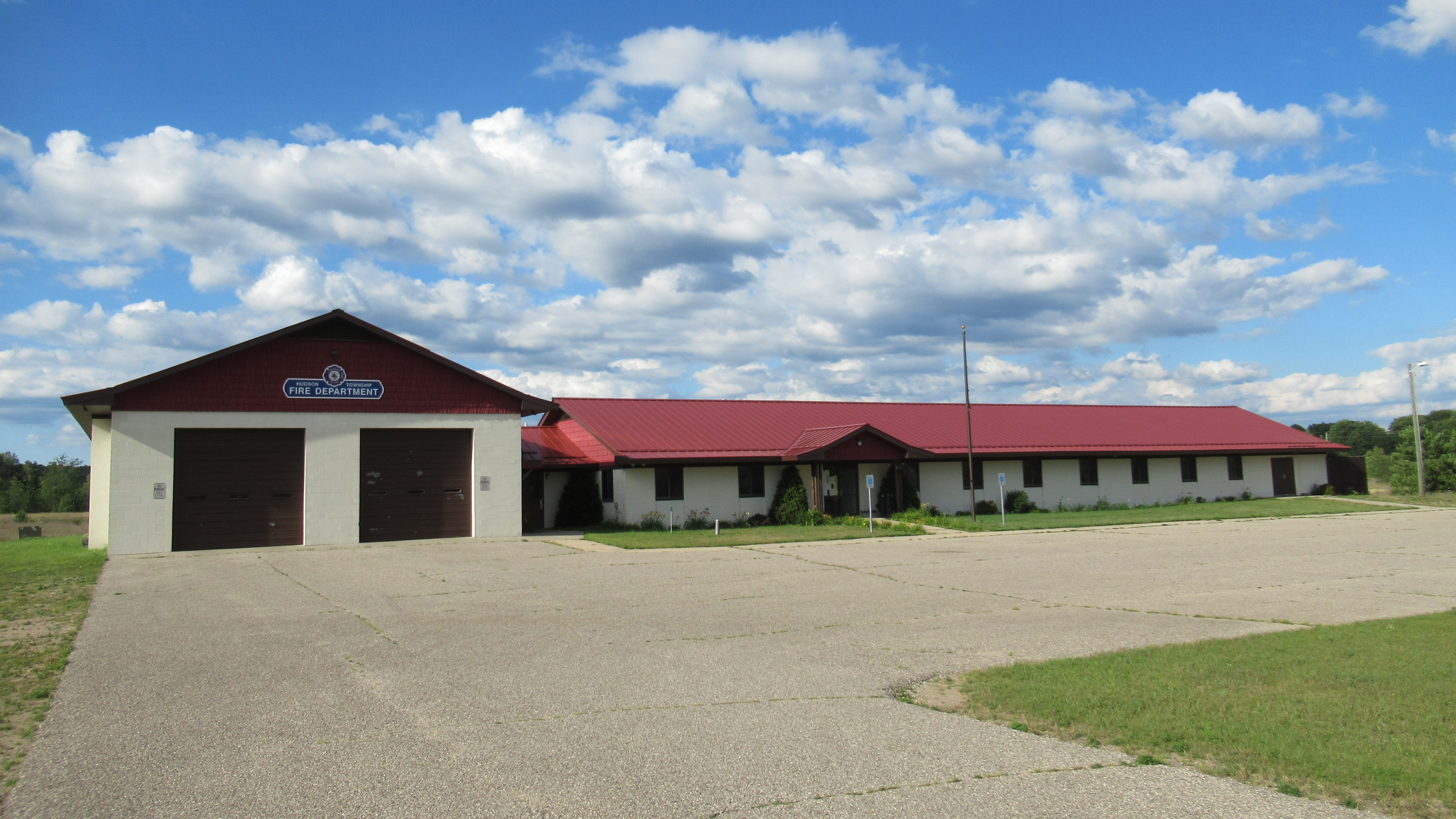
- Hudson Township Office and Fire Department

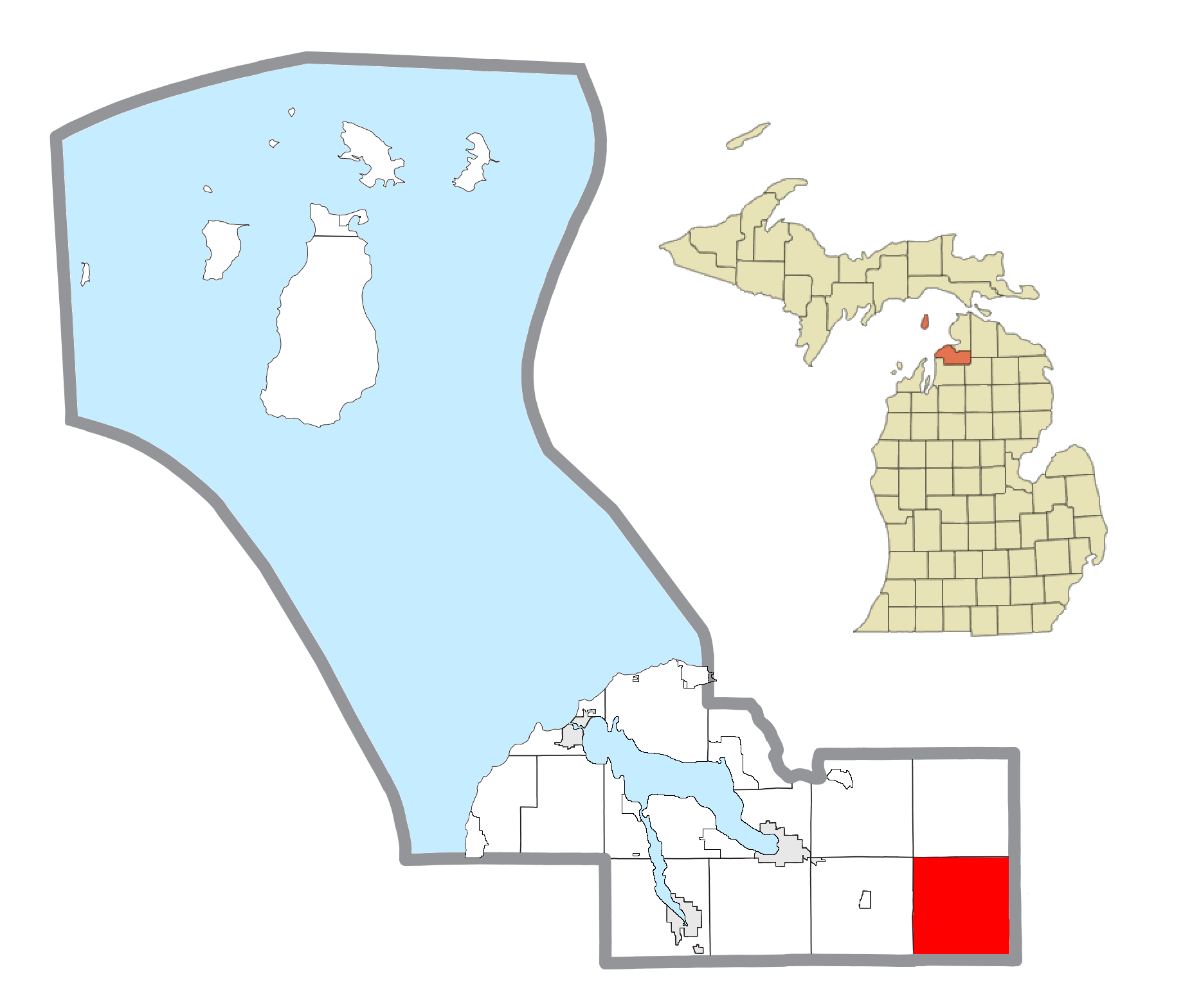
- Location within Charlevoix County

- Location within the state of Michigan Location within the state of Michigan
- Coordinates: 45°09′34″N 84°47′44″W
- Country: United States
- State: Michigan
- County: Charlevoix

Government
  - Supervisor: Terrence Erber
  - Clerk: Cindi Lambdin

Area
  - Total: 35.47 sq mi (91.87 km^{2})
  - Land: 34.31 sq mi (88.86 km^{2})
  - Water: 1.16 sq mi (3.00 km^{2})
- Elevation: 1,257 ft (383 m)

Population (2020)
  - Total: 671
  - Density: 19.6/sq mi (7.55/km^{2})
- Time zone: UTC-5 (Eastern (EST))
  - Summer (DST): UTC-4 (EDT)
- ZIP code(s): 49713 (Boyne Falls); 49730 (Elmira); 49795 (Vanderbilt)
- Area code: 231
- FIPS code: 26-39700
- GNIS feature ID: 1626497
- Website: hudsontownship.org

Hudson Township is a civil township of Charlevoix County in the U.S. state of Michigan. The population was 671 at the 2020 census.

== Communities ==
- Thumb Lake is a former settlement located within the township on the eastern shores of Thumb Lake. It began as a lumbering settlement in 1882, and local grocer James Waggoner served as the first postmaster when the post office opened on September 25, 1882. It was given a train station named Thumb Lake Junction along the Boyne City & Southeastern Railroad. The post office is no longer in operation.

== Geography ==
According to the U.S. Census Bureau, the township has a total area of 35.47 square miles (91.87 km^{2}), of which 34.31 square miles (88.86 km^{2}) is land and 1.16 square miles (3.00 km^{2}) (3.27%) is water.

Thumb Lake is located within Hudson Township.

=== Major highways ===
- C-48 (Thumb Lake Road) is a county-designated highway that runs west–east through the northern portion of the township.

== Demographics ==
As of the census of 2000, there were 639 people, 229 households, and 179 families residing in the township. The population density was 18.6 inhabitants per square mile (7.2/km^{2}). There were 485 housing units at an average density of 14.1 per square mile (5.4/km^{2}). The racial makeup of the township was 97.18% White, 0.16% African American, 1.72% Native American, and 0.94% from two or more races.

There were 229 households, out of which 35.8% had children under the age of 18 living with them, 66.4% were married couples living together, 7.4% had a female householder with no husband present, and 21.8% were non-families. 18.8% of all households were made up of individuals, and 6.1% had someone living alone who was 65 years of age or older. The average household size was 2.71 and the average family size was 3.03.

In the township the population was spread out, with 25.7% under the age of 18, 4.7% from 18 to 24, 32.2% from 25 to 44, 24.6% from 45 to 64, and 12.8% who were 65 years of age or older. The median age was 39 years. For every 100 females, there were 113.7 males. For every 100 females age 18 and over, there were 111.1 males.

The median income for a household in the township was $34,318, and the median income for a family was $37,500. Males had a median income of $27,679 versus $20,208 for females. The per capita income for the township was $15,138. About 8.3% of families and 11.4% of the population were below the poverty line, including 11.0% of those under age 18 and 10.4% of those age 65 or over.

== Education ==
Hudson Township is served almost evenly between two separate public school districts. The western half of the township is served by Boyne Falls Public School District to the west in Boyne Valley Township, while the eastern half of the township is served by Vanderbilt Area Schools to the northeast in the village of Vanderbilt in Otsego County to the east.
