= Hayes Township, Michigan =

Hayes Township may refer to the following places in the U.S. state of Michigan:

- Hayes Township, Charlevoix County, Michigan
- Hayes Township, Clare County, Michigan
- Hayes Township, Otsego County, Michigan

== See also ==
- Hay Township, Michigan
- Haynes Township, Michigan
