= Boyne Mountain Airport =

Public-use airport in Michigan, United States

Coordinates: 45°9′57″N 084°55′27″W

Boyne Mountain Airport (ICAO: KBFA, FAA LID: BFA) is a civil, public use airport located 1 mile west of Boyne Falls, Michigan. The airport is privately owned. It is 4 miles away from Boyne City Municipal Airport. The closest major airport is the Gaylord Regional Airport 13 miles away.

The skiing industry in Boyne Mountain a significant source of traffic for the airport. The airport is routinely among facilities upgraded in the area to support the tourism and holidaymaking industries in the area.

== Facilities and aircraft ==
The airport has one runway: runway 17/35 is 5187 x 60 ft (1581 x 18 m) and is made of asphalt. There is a 10 foot paved shoulder on each side on the last 4700' of runway 35. For the 12-month period ending December 31, 2020, the airport has 91 operations per week, or about 4700 per year, all general aviation. For that same period, no aircraft are based on the field.

The Boyne Mountain Resort operates an FBO on the field offering full-service fuel and hangars as well as general aircraft maintenance. Other amenities include a lounge, conference room, snooze room, and courtesy car.

== Accidents and incidents ==
- On September 21, 2002, a Cessna 172S Skyhawk was damaged during a hard landing at Boyne Mountain Airport. The pilot reported he landed on the center of runway 35 about 800 feet from the beginning of the runway. The pilot had flared too high, landed hard, and bounced. He corrected by adding power and landed normally.

== See also ==
- List of airports in Michigan
