= M-75 (Michigan highway) =

State highway in Michigan, United States

M-75
- M-75 highlighted in red

Route information
- Maintained by MDOT
- Length: 11.768 mi (18.939 km)
- History: 1919–1927 as M-57; 1927–present as M-75

Major junctions
- South end: US 131 at Boyne Falls
- North end: US 131 at Walloon Lake

Location
- Country: United States
- State: Michigan
- Counties: Charlevoix

Highway system
- Michigan State Trunkline Highway System; Interstate; US; State; Byways
← I-75	→ M-76

M-75 is a 11.768-mile-long (18.939 km) segment of state trunkline highway located in Charlevoix County in the U.S. state of Michigan. This highway serves as a loop off US Highway 131 (US 131), providing access to Boyne City. The highway happens to be geographically close to Interstate 75 (I-75), but they are not related.

== Route description ==
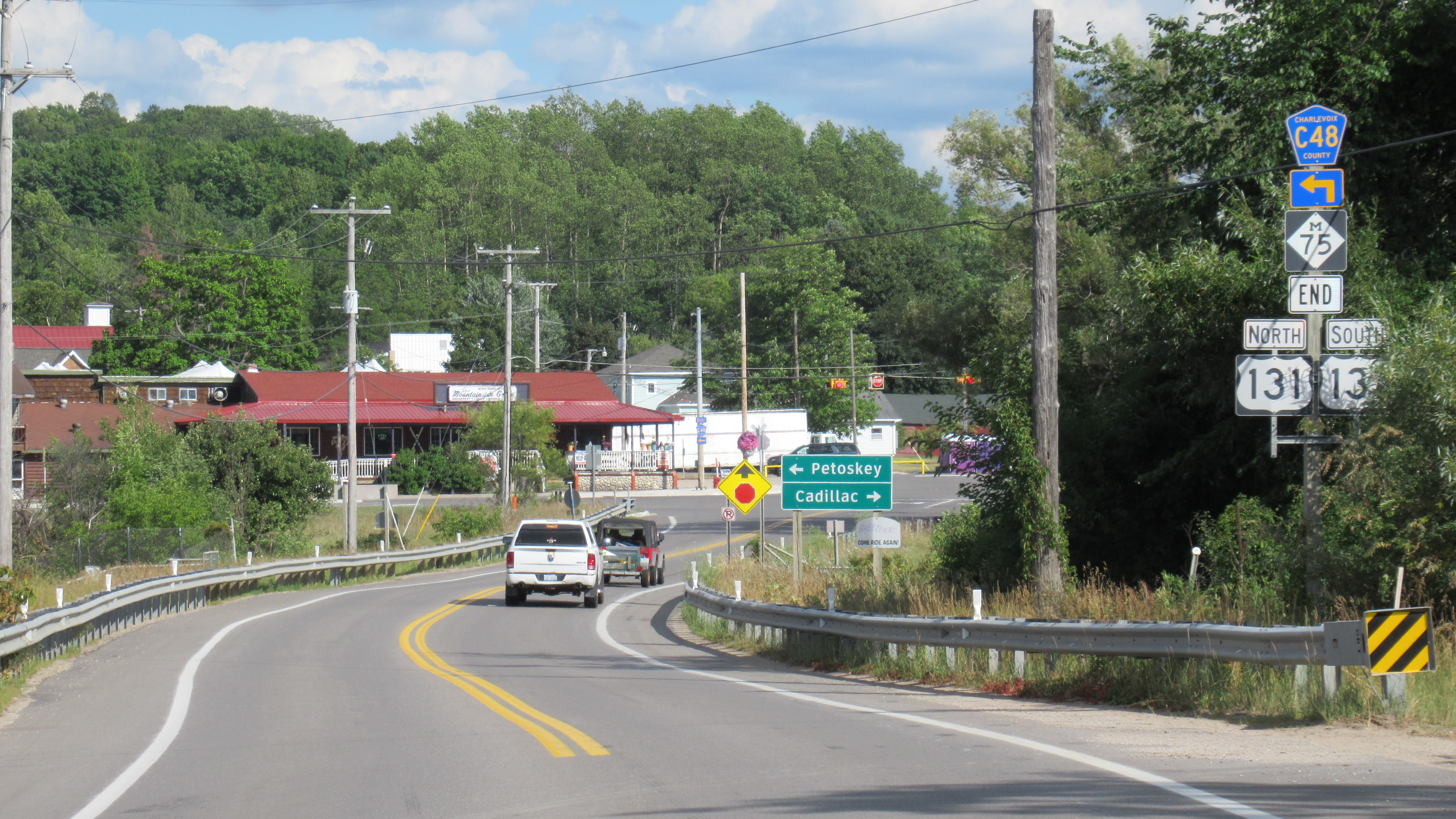
Southern terminus of M-75 at US 131 in Boyne Falls

M-75 begins in downtown Boyne Falls at an intersection with US 131. It follows Mill Street northwesterly out of town, passing to the north of a lake and the Boyne Mountain Airport. The airport property ends at the intersection with C-48 west of Boyne Falls. M-75 runs parallel to the Boyne River until it turns west near the Boyne City Municipal Airport to enter the community of Boyne City on East Division Street. Two blocks further west, it meets C-73/East Jordan Road next to the Maple Lawn Cemetery. Next to the cemetery, the highway follows Boyne Avenue northwesterly into downtown. The trunkline turns north on East Street to cross the Boyne River and then turns east on State Street passing Rotary Park on the way out of town. The Michigan Department of Transportation (MDOT) measures the average annual daily traffic (AADT) in traffic surveys. AADT is a measure of the average traffic levels for a section of roadway on any given day of the year. The southern segment of M-75 carried 6,500 vehicles daily in the 2007 survey. Of these vehicles, commercial traffic was measured at 280 trucks.

East of Boyne City, M-75 turns northward and runs in that direction until turning again to follow the south shore of Walloon Lake. There it follows North Shore Drive into the town of Walloon Lake. M-75 ends at an intersection with US 131. The roadway continues eastward as C-81/Springvale Road. This northern segment carried 4,100 vehicles and 170 trucks in 2007. Neither segment is listed on the National Highway System, a system of strategically important highways.

== History ==
In 1919, the trunkline running through Boyne City was originally labeled M-57. In 1927, the entire highway was renumbered, and since this change, the trunkline has carried the M-75 moniker. The M-75 designation was left unaltered when US 27 between Gaylord and Indian River was converted to a freeway; this freeway was redesignated as I-75 in 1962. A reconstruction project in 1966 bypassed some sharp curves in the roadway and straightened sections between Boyne City and Walloon Lake. As of 2008, the highway remains unaltered since the reconstruction.

== Major intersections ==
The entire highway is in Charlevoix County.

Location	mi	km	Destinations	Notes
Boyne Falls	0.000	0.000	US 131 / C-48 east – Cadillac, Petoskey	Southern end of C-48 concurrency
Boyne Valley Township	0.861	1.386	C-48 west (East Deer Lake Road) – East Jordan	Northern end of C-48 concurrency
Boyne City	4.728	7.609	C-73 south (East Jordan Road) – East Jordan	
Boyne City	5.280	8.497	C-56 west (Lake Street) – Charlevoix	
Walloon Lake	11.768	18.939	US 131 – Cadillac, Petoskey C-81 north (Springvale Road) – Bay View	
1.000 mi = 1.609 km; 1.000 km = 0.621 mi
