= Boyne City Municipal Airport =

Public airport in Michigan, United States

- IATA: none; ICAO: none; FAA LID: N98

Summary
- Airport type: Public
- Owner: City of Boyne City
- Serves: Boyne City, Michigan
- Elevation AMSL: 659.6 ft / 201 m
- Coordinates: 45°12′32″N 084°59′27″W
- Website: http://www.cityofboynecity.com/airport-155/

Map
- Location of airport in Michigan N98 (the United States)

Runways
Direction	Length		Surface
Direction	ft	m	Surface
9/27	4,001	1,220	Asphalt

Statistics (2017)
- Aircraft operations: 11,500
- Based aircraft: 15
- Source: Federal Aviation Administration

Boyne City Municipal Airport (FAA LID: N98) is a public use airport located in the city limits of Boyne City, Michigan. The airport is publicly owned by the City of Boyne City. It is four nautical miles southeast of the Boyne Mountain Airport.

== Facilities and aircraft ==
The airport has one runway: runway 9/27 is 4001 x 75 ft (1220 x 23 m) and made of asphalt.

An FBO is available at the airport. Amenities include a lounge, courtesy car, and fuel.

For the 12-month period ending December 31, 2017, the airport had 25 aircraft operations per day, or just over 9,000 per year, all of which was general aviation. For the same time period, there were 15 aircraft based on the field: 13 airplanes – 12 single-engine and 1 multi-engine – and 2 helicopters.

== Accidents & Incidents ==
- On July 16, 2011, a Taylorcraft DCO-65 crashed after departing from Boyne City Municipal on a local flight. Witnesses reported nothing out of the ordinary before the crash. The cause of the crash was found to be the pilot's failure to maintain control while maneuvering at low altitudes leading to a stall/spin and impacting terrain. The sole pilot onboard was killed.
- On January 6, 2014, a Mooney M20R crashed after takeoff from Boyne City Municipal Airport. Two people on board were killed. The cause of the crash was thought to be loss of control as the pilot was attempting to return to the airport after taking off in a snow storm.
- On November 15, 2021, a Beechcraft King Air crashed while on approach to Boyne City from Oakland County. The pilot and passenger onboard died. Radar data from the flight showed groundspeed slow from 129 to 88 knots.

== See also ==
- List of airports in Michigan
