= Thumb Lake =

Lake in Michigan, United States

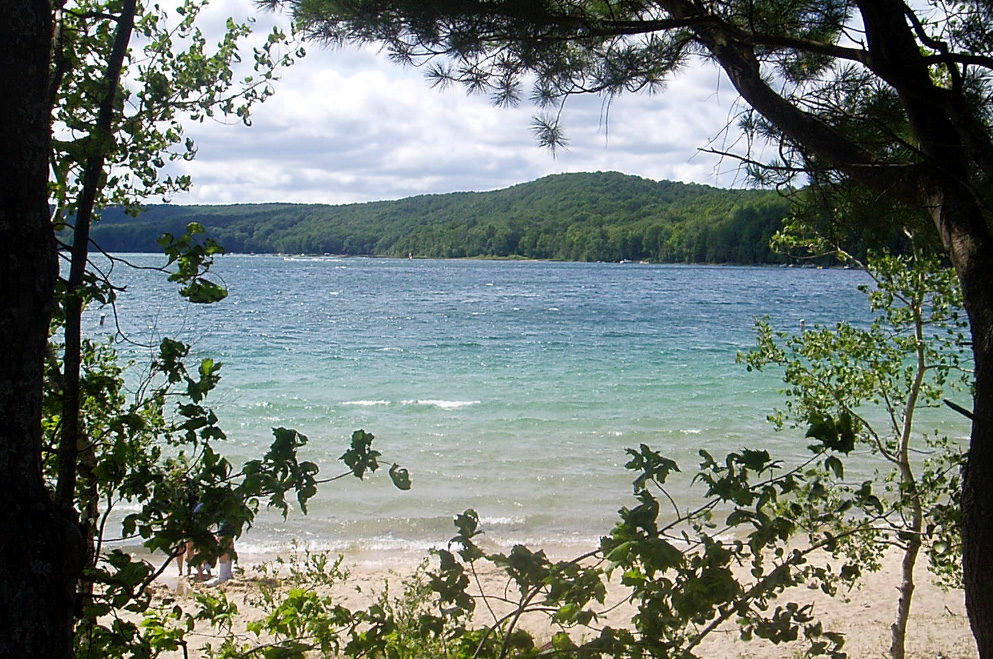

- Location within Michigan
- Location: Charlevoix County, Michigan
- Coordinates: 45°11′N 84°45′W
- Basin countries: United States
- Surface area: 484 acres (2.0 km^{2})
- Max. depth: 152 ft (46 m)
- Surface elevation: 1,033 feet (315 m)

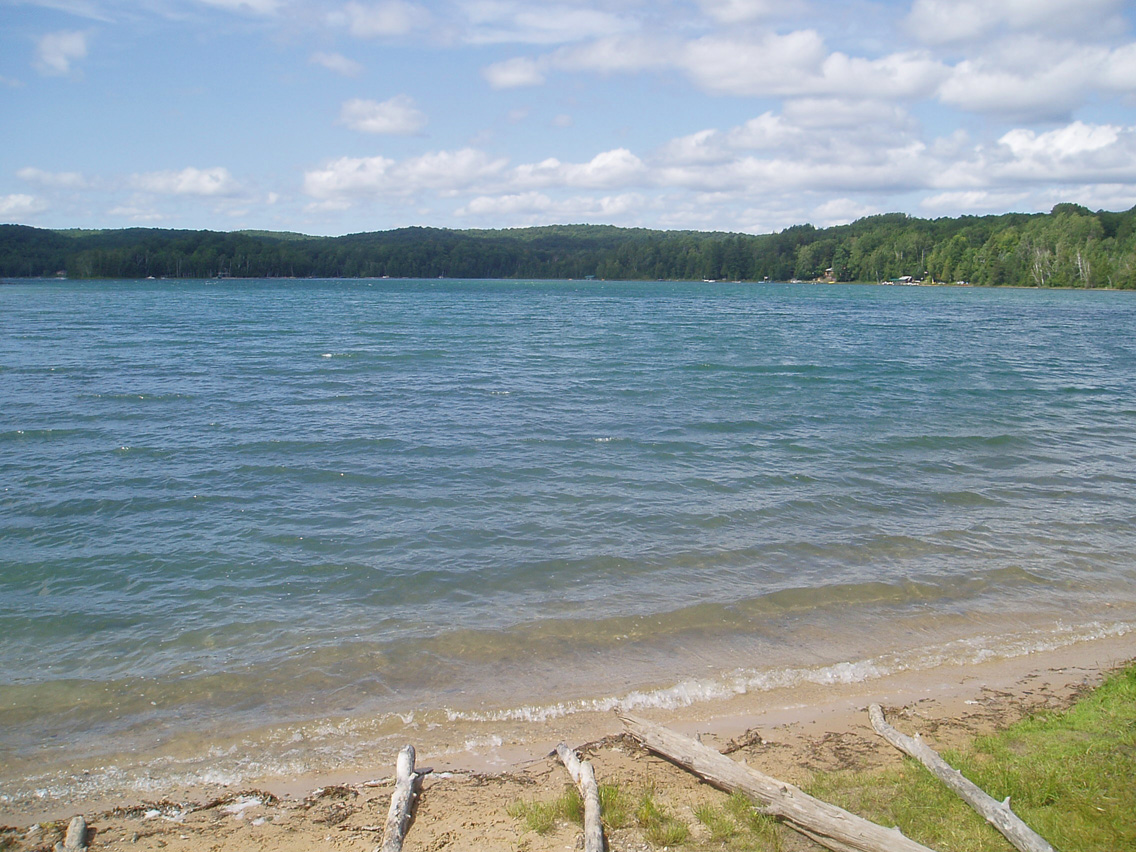
A boat launch on the shore of Thumb Lake

Thumb Lake, also known as Lake Louise by the "Lake Louise Camp" community, is a kettle lake located in Hudson Township, Charlevoix County, Michigan, United States. The epithet Thumb Lake derives from the lake's bathymetry. An islet protrudes from the lake's west basin. The total surface area of the lake is 484 acres (2.0 km^{2}), with maximum depths of 152 feet (46 m).

The misnomer "Lake Louise" comes from a former Camp director who wanted to rename the lake after his wife.

The lake is nestled in the highlands east of the village of Boyne Falls, centered at 45°11′N 84°45′W, and is surrounded by wooded hills. Because of its depth and the dearth of run-off into the lake, its waters are exceptionally clear. The lake is inhabited by splake, a stocked hybrid species (lake trout and brook trout), rainbow trout, yellow perch, smallmouth bass, northern pike, largemouth bass, smelt, and other panfish. Public access is available on the eastern shore of the lake in the form of a park with swimming beach, and on the southwestern shore in the form of a boat launch.

== See also ==
- List of lakes in Michigan
