= Mancelona Township, Michigan =

- Civil township
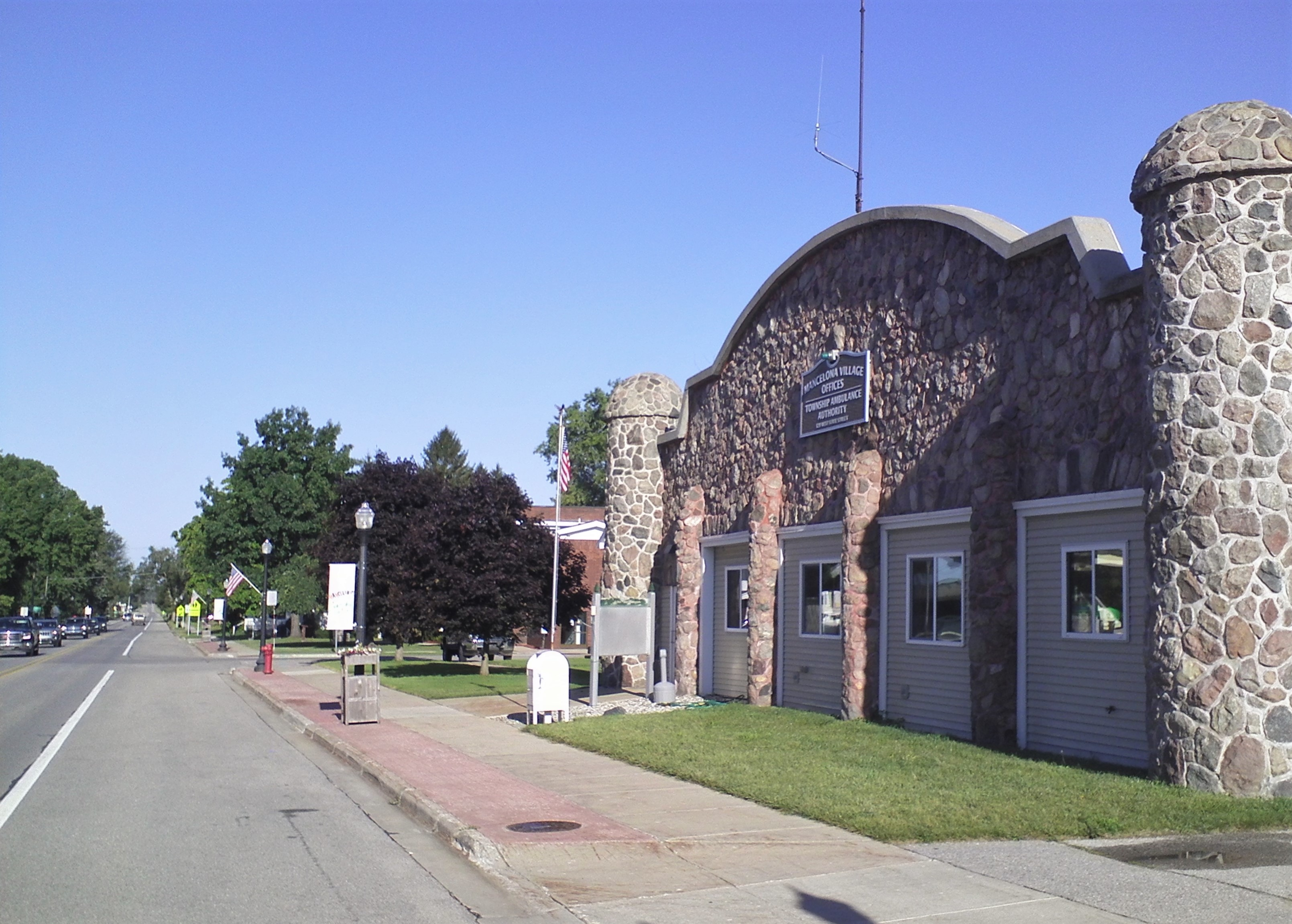
- Mancelona Township Hall in Mancelona

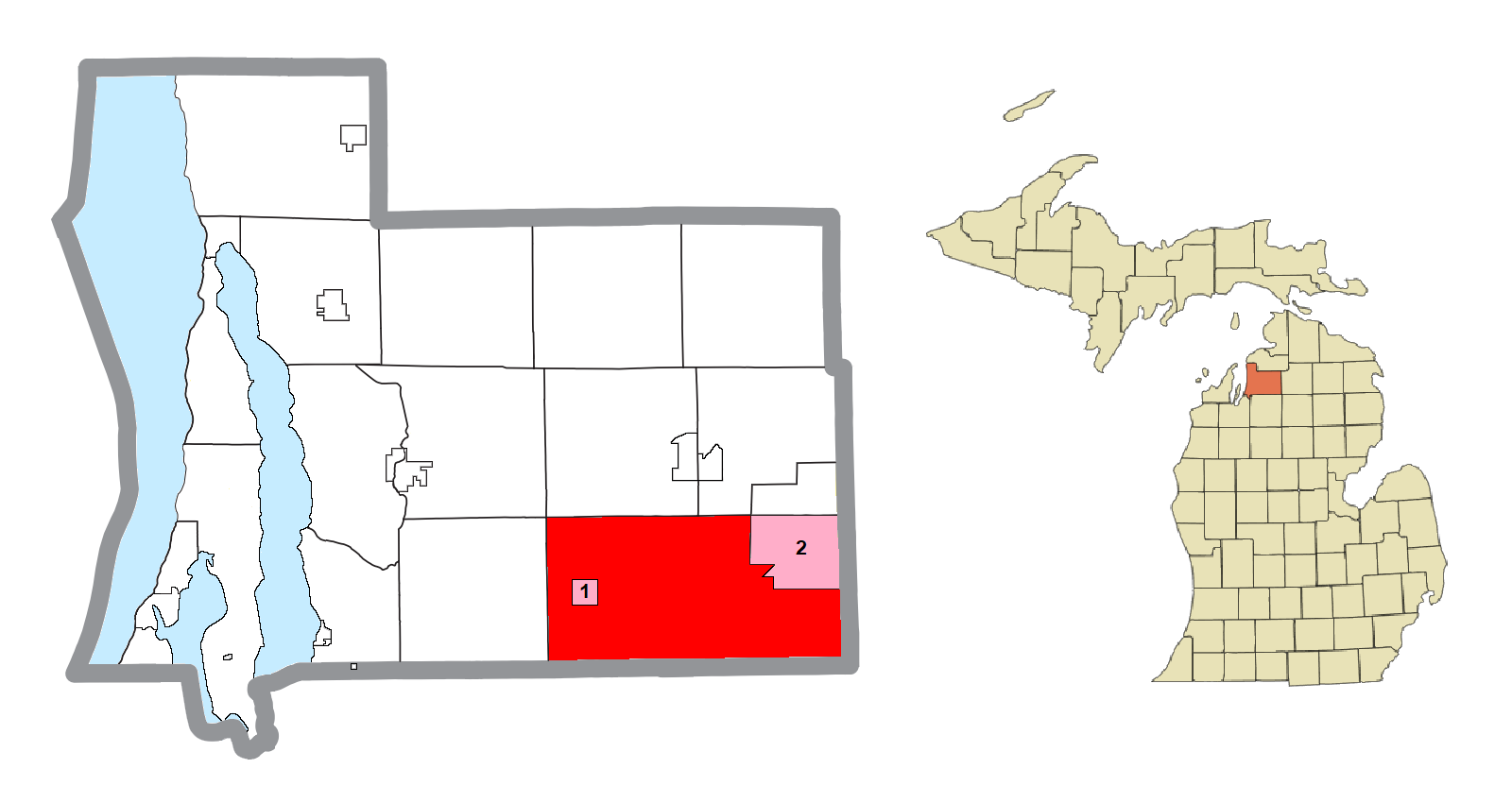
- Location within Antrim County and the administered village of Mancelona (1) and portion of Lakes of the North community (2)

- Location within the state of Michigan Mancelona Township (the United States)
- Coordinates: 44°54′20″N 84°57′33″W
- Country: United States
- State: Michigan
- County: Antrim
- Established: 1871

Government
  - Supervisor: Chuck Johnson
  - Clerk: Michael Biehl

Area
  - Total: 71.4 sq mi (184.9 km^{2})
  - Land: 71.1 sq mi (184.2 km^{2})
  - Water: 0.23 sq mi (0.6 km^{2})
- Elevation: 1,339 ft (408 m)

Population (2020)
  - Total: 4,311
  - Density: 61.9/sq mi (23.9/km^{2})
- Time zone: UTC-5 (Eastern (EST))
  - Summer (DST): UTC-4 (EDT)
- ZIP code(s): 49659 (Mancelona); 49730 (Elmira)
- Area code: 231
- FIPS code: 26-50640
- GNIS feature ID: 1626664
- Website: Official website

Mancelona Township (/mænˌsəˈloʊnə/ man-sə-LOW-nə) is a civil township of Antrim County in the U.S. state of Michigan. The population was 4,311 at the 2020 census.

== Communities ==
- Antrim is a former company town on US Route 131 approximately one mile southwest of Mancelona at 44°53′24″N 85°04′26″W. In the 1940 census it had 610 residents. It was not delineated in the 1950 census. John Otis & Company built a charcoal furnace in 1882. In 1883, E.K. Robinson platted and recorded the village with the name "Furnaceville" for Mr. Otis. Its station on the Grand Rapids and Indiana Railroad was named "Furnace". The village and depot were renamed Antrim after the Otis interests were bought by the Antrim Iron Company. Many of the settlers in this area were relocated from Kentucky to work in the local iron smelting plant.
- Lakes of the North is partially located within Mancelona Township. For statistical purposes, Lakes of the North is defined as a census-designated place and had population of 925 at the 2010 census. The northern portion of the community extends into Star Township.
- Mancelona is located within the township at the junction of US 131 and M-88 and M-66. The Mancelona ZIP Code, 49659, serves most of the township.

== Geography ==
According to the United States Census Bureau, the township has a total area of 71.4 square miles (184.9 km^{2}), of which 71.1 square miles (184.2 km^{2}) is land and 0.23 square miles (0.6 km^{2}), or 0.35%, is water.

== Demographics ==
As of the census of 2000, there were 4,100 people, 1,511 households, and 1,093 families residing in the township. The population density was 57.4 inhabitants per square mile (22.2/km^{2}). There were 2,150 housing units at an average density of 30.1 per square mile (11.6/km^{2}). The racial makeup of the township was 96.46% White, 0.22% African American, 1.29% Native American, 0.02% Asian, 0.05% Pacific Islander, 0.27% from other races, and 1.68% from two or more races. Hispanic or Latino of any race were 1.49% of the population.

There were 1,511 households, out of which 36.1% had children under the age of 18 living with them, 54.4% were married couples living together, 11.7% had a female householder with no husband present, and 27.6% were non-families. 22.6% of all households were made up of individuals, and 9.7% had someone living alone who was 65 years of age or older. The average household size was 2.70 and the average family size was 3.12.

In the township the population was spread out, with 29.5% under the age of 18, 8.6% from 18 to 24, 28.0% from 25 to 44, 22.0% from 45 to 64, and 12.0% who were 65 years of age or older. The median age was 34 years. For every 100 females, there were 98.8 males. For every 100 females age 18 and over, there were 97.3 males.

The median income for a household in the township was $30,858, and the median income for a family was $33,045. Males had a median income of $29,731 versus $19,825 for females. The per capita income for the township was $13,574. About 12.8% of families and 15.7% of the population were below the poverty line, including 18.9% of those under age 18 and 6.0% of those age 65 or over.
