= Antrim Iron Company =

Iron works

Coordinates: 44.88932°N 85.07337°W

The Antrim Iron Company was an iron works that operated in Antrim, Michigan from 1886 to 1945. The site of the iron works was south of Mancelona, between U.S. Route 131 and the railroad tracks.

== History ==
In 1882, an organization by the name of "John Otis & Company" built a large charcoal furnace on the site. The company also platted a town around the furnace, naming it "Furnaceville". Soon after this, the Grand Rapids and Indiana Railroad built a station in the town. The furnace flourished, and in 1886 a group of businessmen from Grand Rapids bought out the company and organized the Antrim Iron Company, and the town was renamed Antrim. A large blast furnace and iron works was built on the site, and the new company began doing business.

== Methods of manufacturing and transportation ==
In the beginning of the corporation, timber was hauled in from various lumber camps around Northern Michigan to be used for iron products at the plant. After many years of buying material to create the iron with, the company decided to obtain its own timber, and in 1894 built a small railroad branch (named the Mancelona North Western Railroad) heading 2 miles west from the company site. With this spur line, the company logged its own lumber and hauled it in on its own railroad, proving to be quite self-sufficient. This lasted until 1907 when the lumber ran out and other ways were developed to obtain the iron.

== The war ==
During World War II the company became extremely busy. With the vast need for materials for the war effort, the factory was working around the clock trying to produce enough products for the orders they were getting. The furnace, however, ceased operation in October 1943.

== Closing, demise, and current status ==
The company's active operations ended in 1945, which the Grand Rapids History Center attributes to the depletion of natural resources; the company remained a legal entity for about three decades, primarily as a real estate owner. The factory stood abandoned for over forty years, until it was torn down in the mid-1980s. Today all that is left of the old furnace consists of a few foundations, a small outbuilding, and a former railroad siding. The company dumped its waste in a pond behind the building, which years later, led to water contamination in the town. The pond, called "Tar Lake", became the center of the Tar Lake Superfund site, which the EPA added to its National Priorities List in 1983. A first cleanup remedy was selected in 1992, but in 2013 the EPA determined that additional soil excavation and expanded groundwater treatment were required, and remedial action activities for this work began in 2024.
