= Warner Township, Michigan =

- Civil township
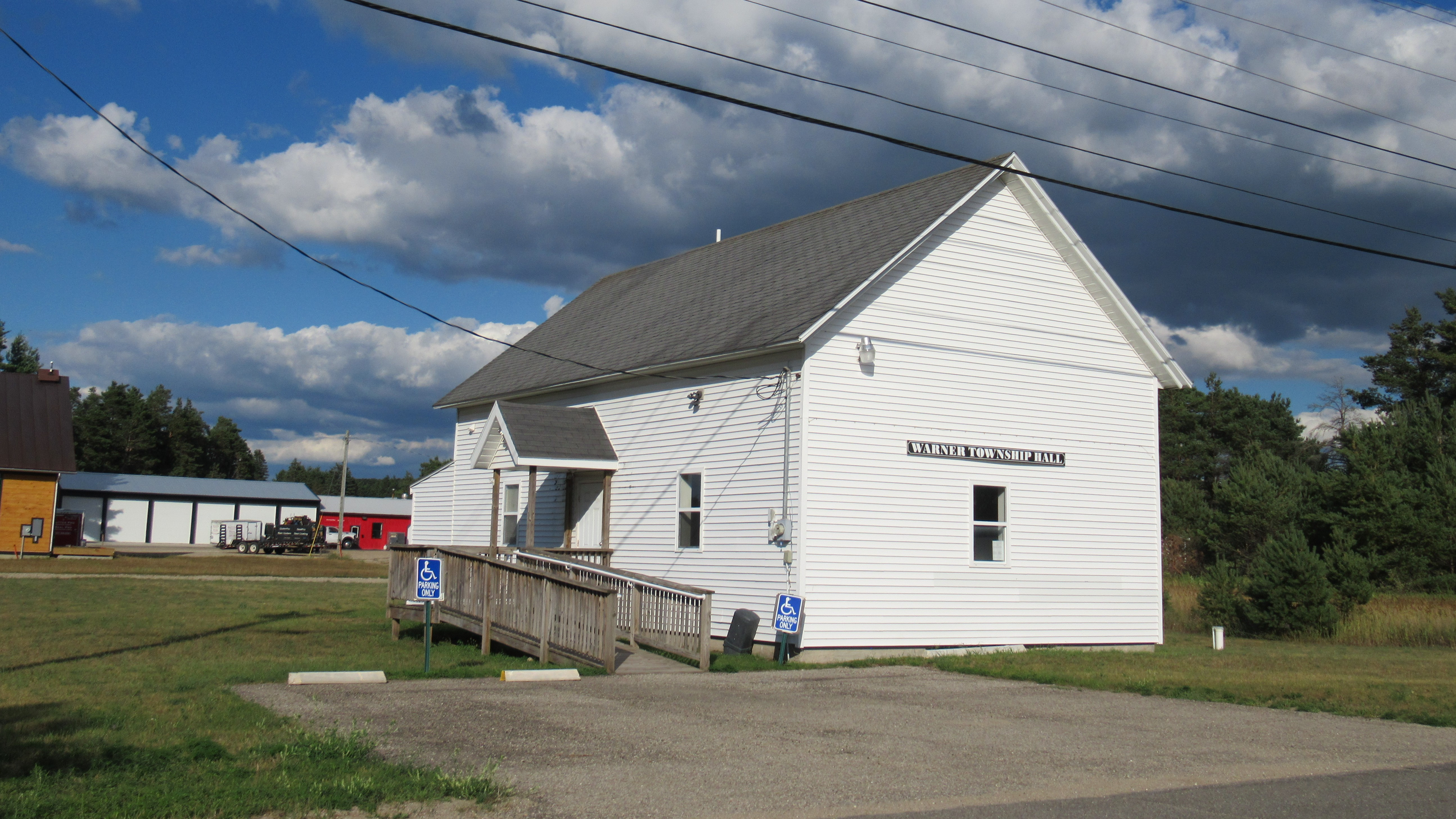
- Warner Township Hall in Elmira

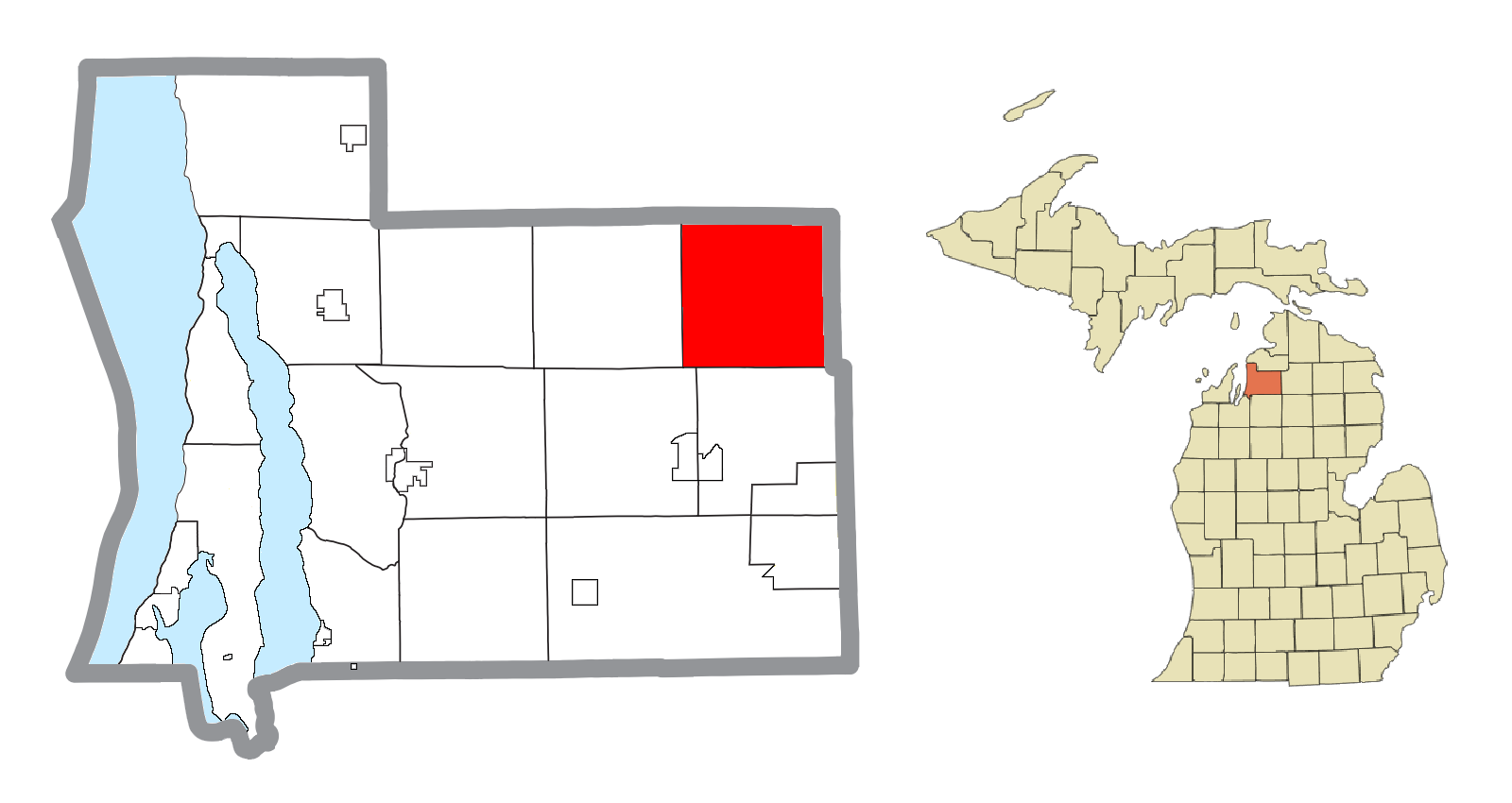
- Location within Antrim County

- Location within the state of Michigan Warner Township (the United States)
- Coordinates: 45°04′31″N 84°54′46″W
- Country: United States
- State: Michigan
- County: Antrim

Government
  - Supervisor: Martin Franckowiak
  - Clerk: Pam Zaremba

Area
  - Total: 35.59 sq mi (92.18 km^{2})
  - Land: 35.50 sq mi (91.94 km^{2})
  - Water: 0.089 sq mi (0.23 km^{2})
- Elevation: 1,263 ft (385 m)

Population (2020)
  - Total: 364
  - Density: 10.3/sq mi (3.96/km^{2})
- Time zone: UTC-5 (Eastern (EST))
  - Summer (DST): UTC-4 (EDT)
- ZIP code(s): 49712 (Boyne City); 49713 (Boyne Falls); 49727 (East Jordan); 49730 (Elmira)
- Area code: 231
- FIPS code: 26-83300
- GNIS feature ID: 1627212
- Website: https://warnertownship.org/

Warner Township is a civil township of Antrim County in the U.S. state of Michigan. The population was 364 at the 2020 census.

== Geography ==
According to the U.S. Census Bureau, the township has a total area of 35.59 square miles (92.18 km^{2}), of which 35.50 square miles (91.94 km^{2}) is land and 0.09 square miles (0.23 km^{2}) (0.25%) is water.

== Demographics ==
As of the census of 2000, there were 389 people, 133 households, and 107 families residing in the township. The population density was 11.0 per square mile (4.2/km^{2}). There were 185 housing units at an average density of 5.2 per square mile (2.0/km^{2}). The racial makeup of the township was 94.60% White, 0.26% African American, 1.29% Native American, and 3.86% from two or more races. Hispanic or Latino of any race were 0.77% of the population.

There were 133 households, out of which 42.9% had children under the age of 18 living with them, 66.2% were married couples living together, 9.8% had a female householder with no husband present, and 19.5% were non-families. 14.3% of all households were made up of individuals, and 6.0% had someone living alone who was 65 years of age or older. The average household size was 2.92 and the average family size was 3.20.

In the township the population was spread out, with 27.8% under the age of 18, 8.2% from 18 to 24, 32.4% from 25 to 44, 20.8% from 45 to 64, and 10.8% who were 65 years of age or older. The median age was 36 years. For every 100 females, there were 116.1 males. For every 100 females age 18 and over, there were 105.1 males.

The median income for a household in the township was $35,357, and the median income for a family was $42,188. Males had a median income of $27,727 versus $22,188 for females. The per capita income for the township was $14,948. About 2.1% of families and 8.6% of the population were below the poverty line, including 5.3% of those under age 18 and 9.3% of those age 65 or over.
