= Elmira Township, Michigan =

- Civil township
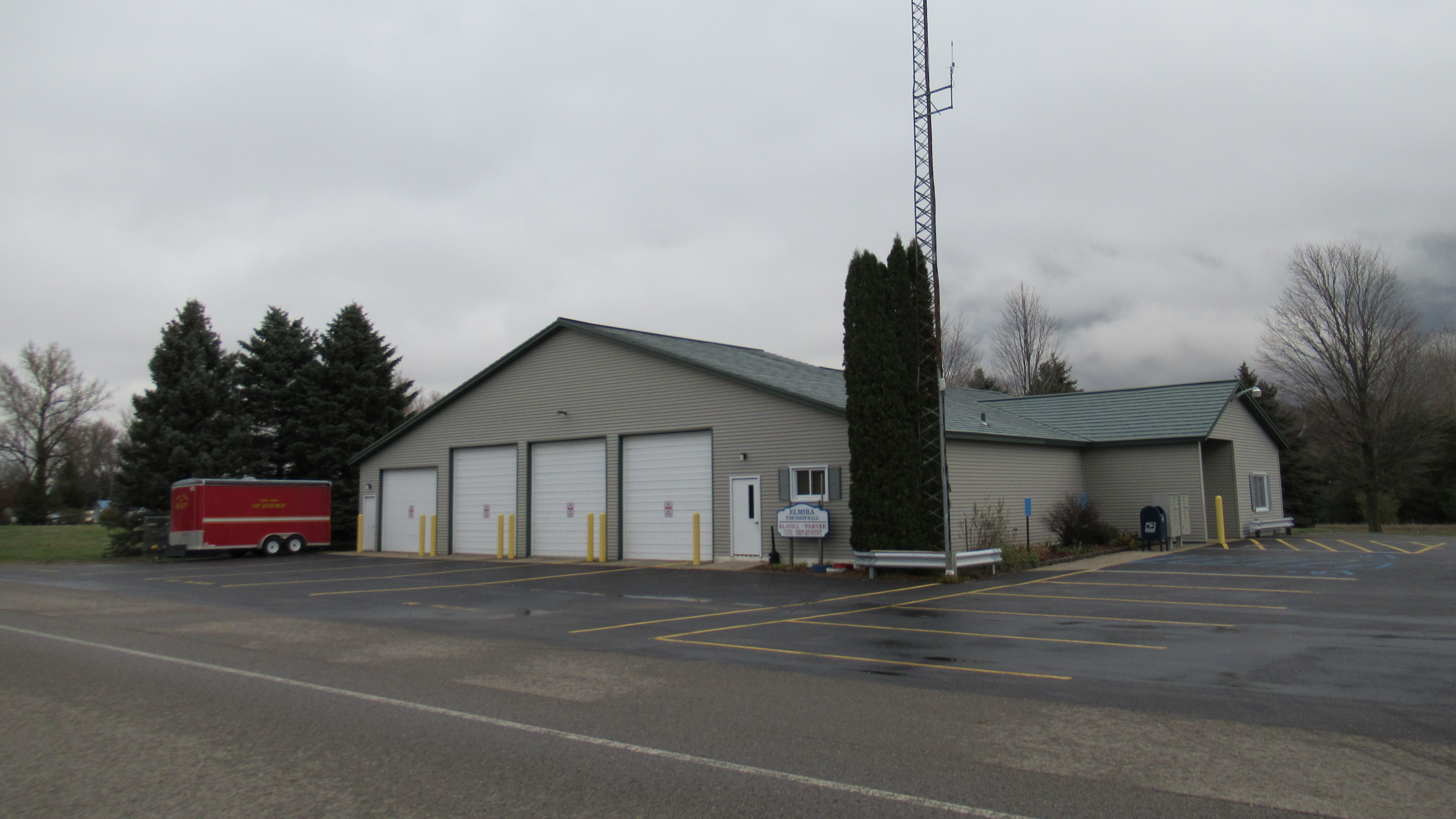
- Elmira Township Hall in Elmira

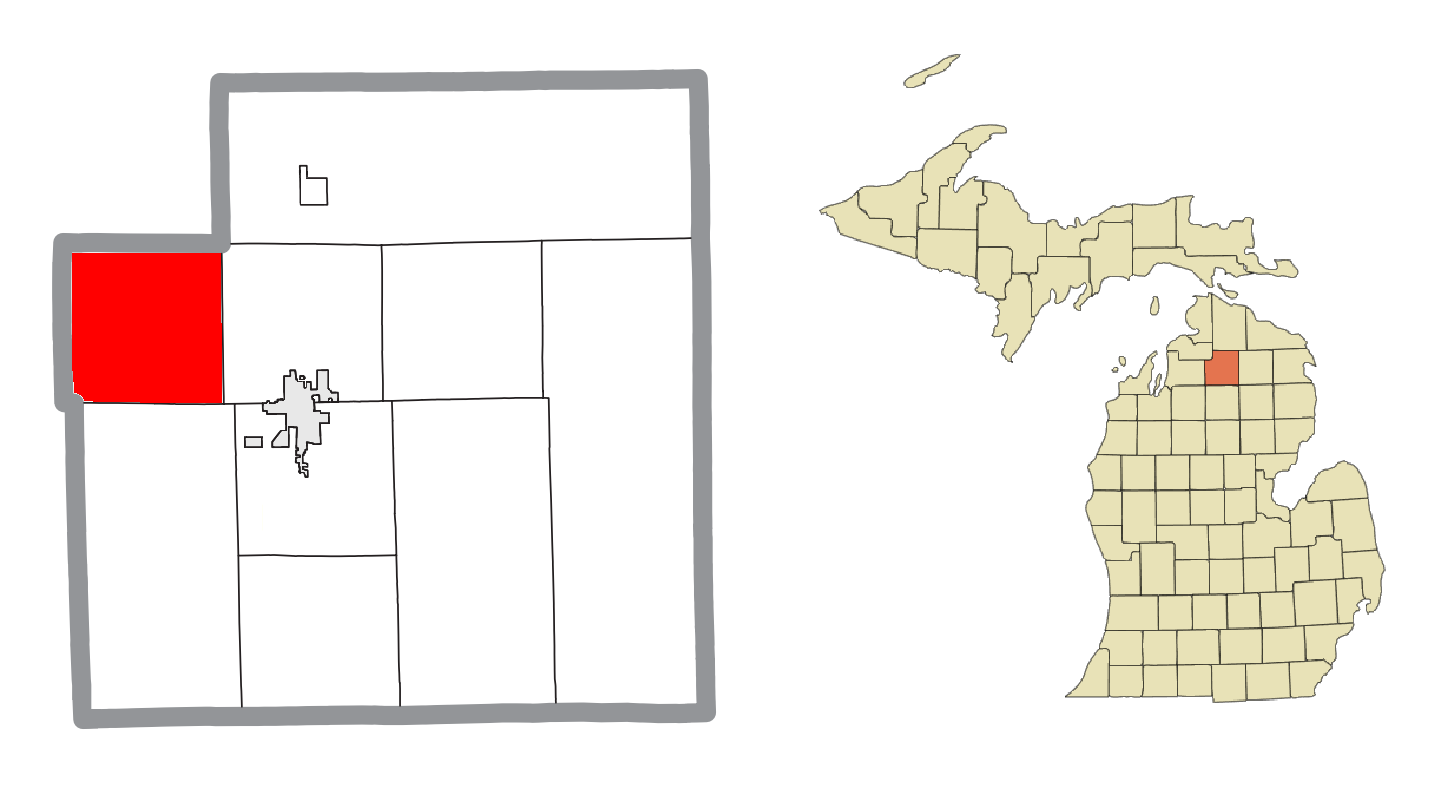
- Location within Otsego County

- Location within the state of Michigan Location within the United States
- Coordinates: 45°04′03″N 84°49′28″W
- Country: United States
- State: Michigan
- County: Otsego
- Established: 1875

Government
  - Supervisor: Diane Franckowiak
  - Clerk: Susan Schaedig

Area
  - Total: 36.27 sq mi (93.94 km^{2})
  - Land: 35.84 sq mi (92.83 km^{2})
  - Water: 0.43 sq mi (1.11 km^{2})
- Elevation: 1,362 ft (415 m)

Population (2020)
  - Total: 1,714
  - Density: 47.82/sq mi (18.46/km^{2})
- Time zone: UTC-5 (Eastern (EST))
  - Summer (DST): UTC-4 (EDT)
- ZIP code(s): 49730 (Elmira)
- Area code: 989
- FIPS code: 26-25620
- GNIS feature ID: 1626233
- Website: Official website

Elmira Township is a civil township of Otsego County in the U.S. state of Michigan. The population was 1,714 at the 2020 census.

== Communities ==
- Elmira is an unincorporated community located along M-32 on the county line with Antrim County at 45°03′52″N 84°51′22″W.

== Geography ==
According to the U.S. Census Bureau, the township has a total area of 36.27 square miles (93.94 km^{2}), of which 35.84 square miles (92.83 km^{2}) is land and 0.43 square miles (1.11 km^{2}) (1.19%) is water.

== Demographics ==
As of the census of 2000, there were 1,598 people, 555 households, and 470 families residing in the township. The population density was 44.7 inhabitants per square mile (17.3/km^{2}). There were 700 housing units at an average density of 19.6 units per square mile (7.6 units/km^{2}). The racial makeup of the township was 96.68% White, 0.63% Native American, 1.19% Asian, 0.13% from other races, and 1.38% from two or more races. Hispanic or Latino of any race were 1.13% of the population.

There were 555 households, out of which 41.3% had children under the age of 18 living with them, 74.6% were married couples living together, 5.9% had a female householder with no husband present, and 15.3% were non-families. 12.8% of all households were made up of individuals, and 4.0% had someone living alone who was 65 years of age or older. The average household size was 2.88 and the average family size was 3.11.

In the township the population was spread out, with 30.3% under the age of 18, 5.8% from 18 to 24, 27.9% from 25 to 44, 26.0% from 45 to 64, and 10.0% who were 65 years of age or older. The median age was 36 years. For every 100 females, there were 99.5 males. For every 100 females age 18 and over, there were 100.7 males.

The median income for a household in the township was $45,938, and the median income for a family was $49,911. Males had a median income of $34,330 versus $23,333 for females. The per capita income for the township was $19,286. About 5.5% of families and 6.9% of the population were below the poverty line, including 10.2% of those under age 18 and 5.0% of those age 65 or over.
