= Boyne Mountain Resort =

Ski area in Michigan, United States

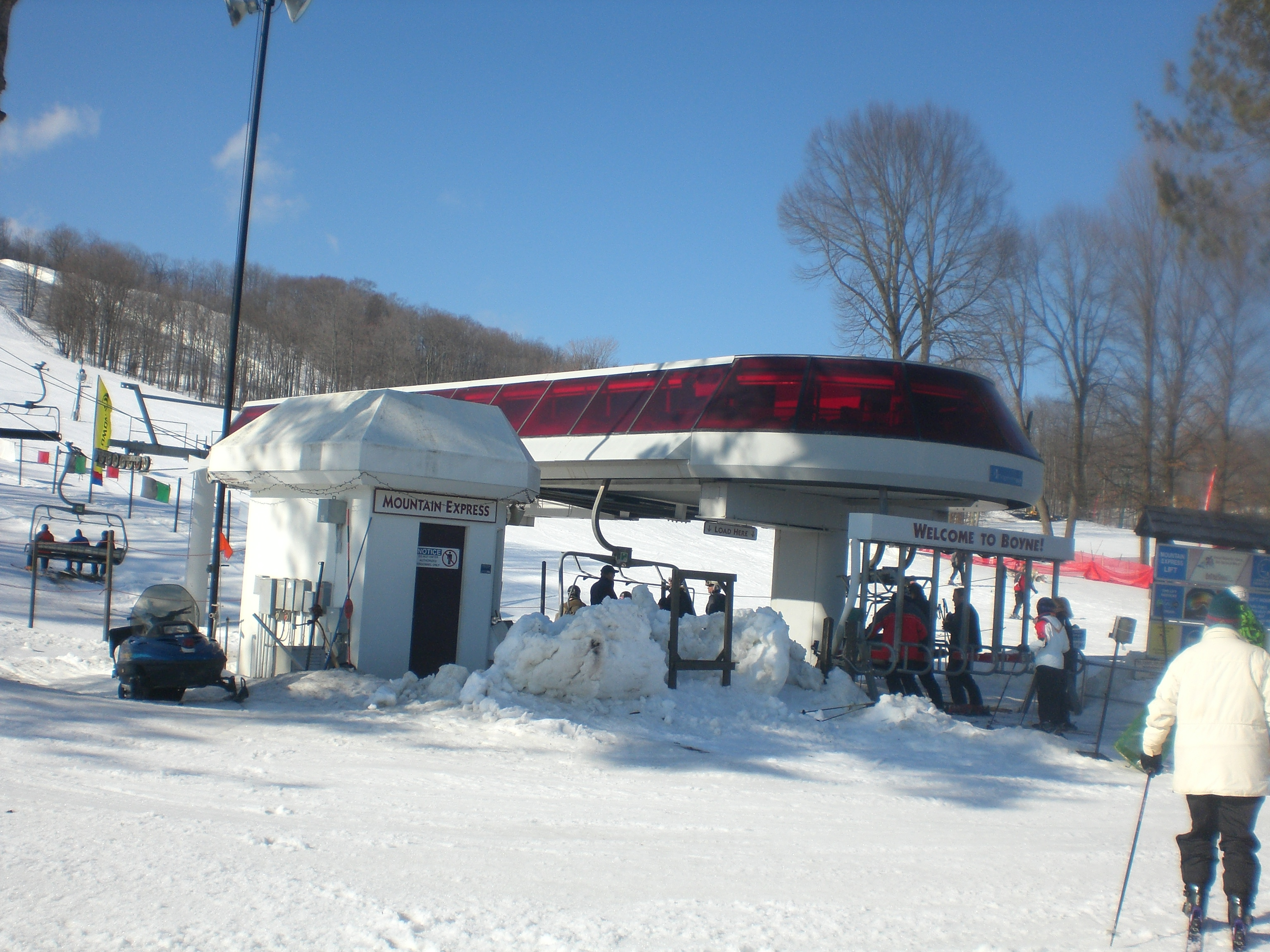

- Location within Michigan Location within the United States
- Location: Boyne Valley Township, Charlevoix County
- Nearest city: Boyne Falls, Michigan
- Coordinates: 45°09′50″N 84°55′58″W
- Status: Operating
- Owner: Boyne Resorts
- Vertical: 433 ft (132 m)
- Top elevation: 1,152 ft (351 m)
- Base elevation: 719 ft (219 m)
- Skiable area: 175 acres (0.71 km^{2})
- Trails: 60
- Lift capacity: 22,650
- Terrain parks: Yes, 4
- Snowmaking: Yes, 90%
- Night skiing: Yes
- Website: Boyne.com

Boyne Mountain Resort is a ski resort with a collection of accommodations in Northern Michigan located near Boyne City operated by Boyne Resorts. The center piece is an upscale resort called The Mountain Grand Lodge and Spa.

Boyne Mountain has continued use of the first chairlift built, constructed by the Union Pacific Railroad in 1936 for use at its new resort in Sun Valley, Idaho. It is also the location of Avalanche Bay, the largest indoor water park in Michigan. Boyne Mountain is the sister resort of Boyne Highlands.

== History ==
The Boyne Mountain Resort was originally co-developed by Everett Kircher, Jim Christianson and John Norton. The group purchased the site for $1 in 1948 from Michigan Senator William Pierson and opened it as a ski resort in 1949. The founders acquired the first chairlift ever built (from Sun Valley, Idaho) and moved it to Boyne Mountain where parts are still in use today.

Between 1948 and 1992, Boyne Mountain and Boyne Highlands innovated in chairlifts, creating the world's first triple chairlift (1963), world's first quad chairlift (1965) and the US's first six-passenger chairlift (1992).

== Skiing and snowboarding ==
=== Alpine skiing and snowboarding ===
Boyne Mountain has ten chairlifts and a carpet lift, which lead to 60 runs including all of the standard difficulty ratings, from green to double black.

=== Freestyle skiing and snowboarding ===
Boyne Mountain has four terrain parks and a ski cross course. The biggest park is called "Meadows Terrain Park," and others include "Ramshead Park" and "Fritz Progression Park".

== Other activities ==
=== Golf ===
Boyne Mountain has two nearby golf courses: The Alpine and The Monument.

==== The Alpine ====
The Alpine course at Boyne Mountain weaves down the mountain towards Deer Lake. There are several water hazards and sand bunkers placed by the owners, making for, in their words, "A thrilling round".

==== The Monument ====
The Monument course has each hole dedicated to a golf legend, and uses golf course designs pioneered by several different architects. The owners refer to it as a "playable hall of fame."

=== The Mountain Grand Lodge and Spa ===
The Mountain Grand Lodge and Spa is very close to the mountain and contains a spa, lodging, an indoor waterpark, and is located next to the Ski Rental Shop. It opened in the winter of 2005

=== Zipline Adventure ===
The Adventure Center's Zipline Adventure has a 2.5 hour long zipline tour and an under an hour Twin Zip. The full tour features 10 lines (nine in the winter) and reach speeds up to 20-25 mph. The Twin Zip is 780 feet long and 25+ feet high and is the last zip of the full tour.

=== Disc golf ===
There is a disc golf course starting at the top of Boyne Mountain at Hemlock and ends at the Ski Patrol building. Disc rentals are available at the Adventure Center.

=== SkyBridge Michigan ===
On October 15, 2022, the resort opened SkyBridge Michigan, which it claims is the "world's longest timber-towered suspension bridge".

=== Swimming ===
Boyne Mountain has luxurious heated pools and hot tubs at the Clock Tower Lodge and the Mountain Grand Lodge and Spa. All guests staying at the resort have access to the Clock Tower Lodge pool and hot tub. During the summer months, the Dear Lake Beach is open for swimming and beach activities and games.
