= Boyne Valley Township, Michigan =

- Civil township
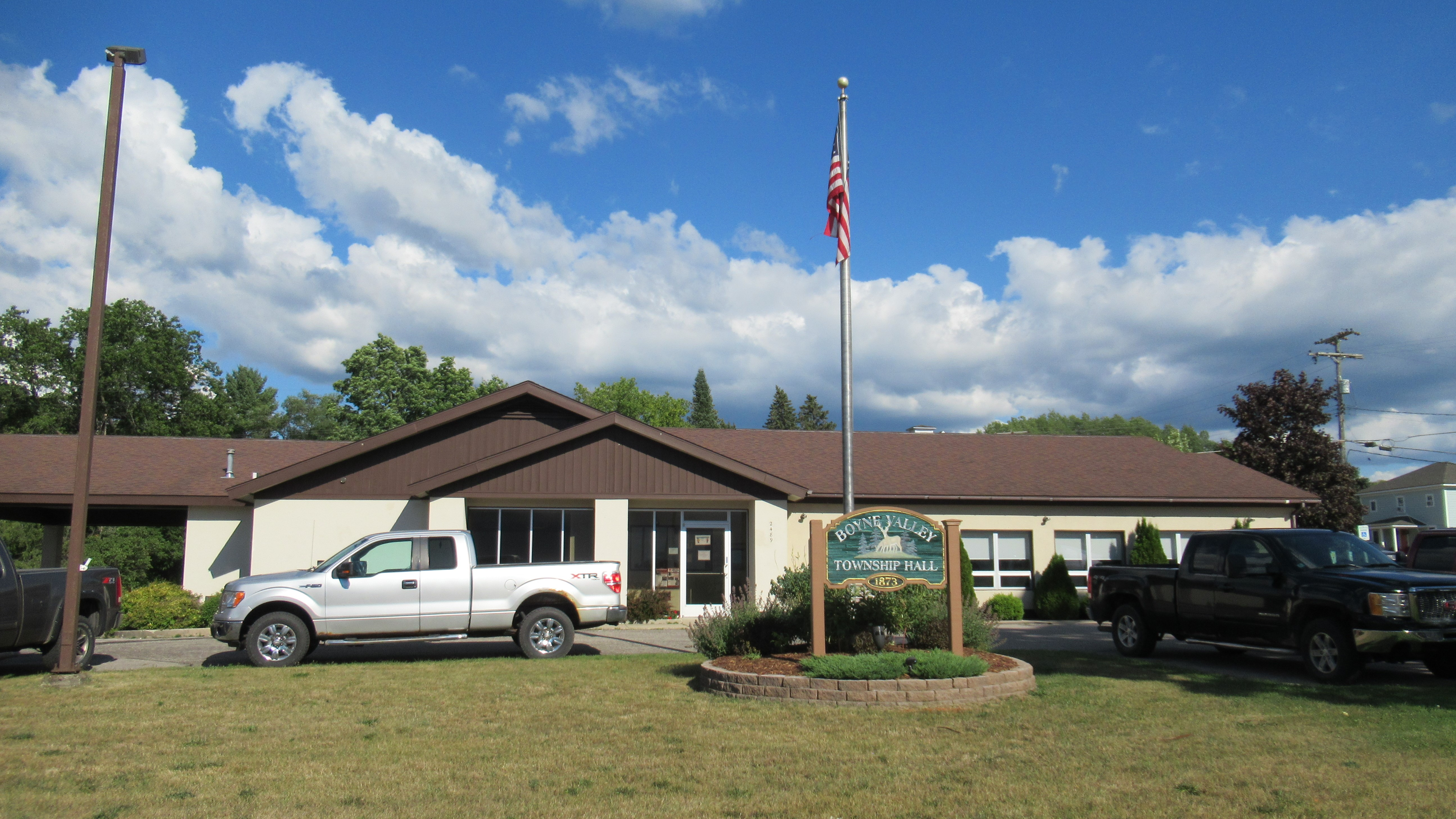
- Boyne Valley Township Hall in Boyne Falls

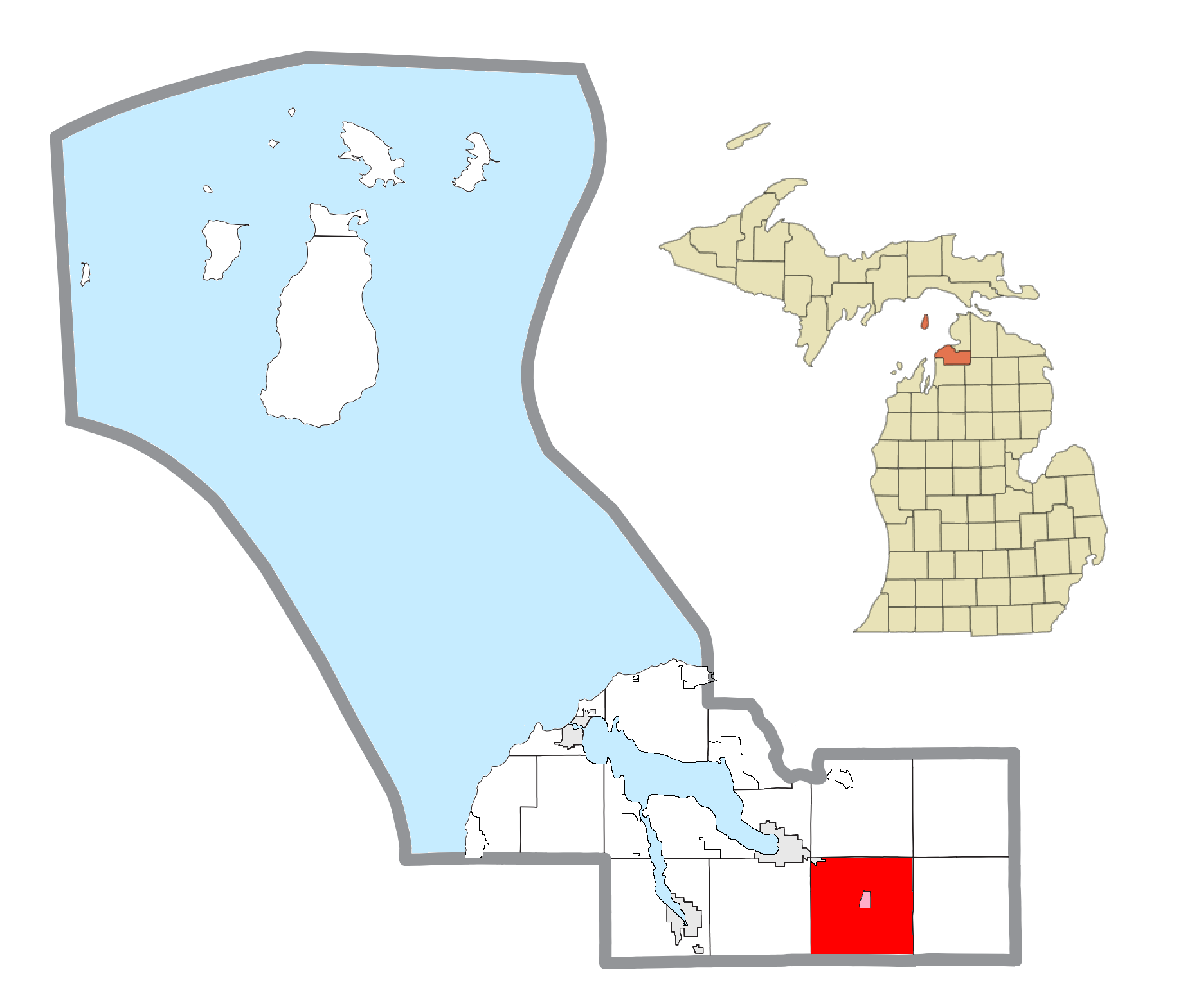
- Location within Charlevoix County (red) and the administered village of Boyne Falls (pink)

- Location within the state of Michigan Location within the United States
- Coordinates: 45°09′51″N 84°54′58″W
- Country: United States
- State: Michigan
- County: Charlevoix
- Established: 1873

Area
  - Total: 35.45 sq mi (91.82 km^{2})
  - Land: 34.78 sq mi (90.08 km^{2})
  - Water: 0.67 sq mi (1.74 km^{2})
- Elevation: 712 ft (217 m)

Population (2020)
  - Total: 1,425
  - Density: 40.97/sq mi (15.82/km^{2})
- Time zone: UTC-5 (Eastern (EST))
  - Summer (DST): UTC-4 (EDT)
- ZIP code(s): 49712 (Boyne City); 49713 (Boyne Falls)
- Area code: 231
- FIPS code: 26-09860
- GNIS feature ID: 1625966
- Website: Official website

Boyne Valley Township is a civil township of Charlevoix County in the U.S. state of Michigan. The population was 1,425 at the 2020 census.

The township was established in 1873 and contains the village of Boyne Falls and Boyne Mountain Resort.

== Communities ==
- Boyne Falls is an incorporated village located in the center of the township at 45°10′03″N 84°54′45″W.
- Cushman is a former community located along the Boyne City Railroad, where a railway station was built in 1893. The station served as a stopover between the Doyle and Moore stations.
- Doyle's Siding is a former settlement that existed along the Boyne City Railroad about 3.0 miles (4.8 km) southeast of Boyne City. A station named Doyle was built here in 1894 to help transport the area's plentiful supply of lumber.
- Moore is a former settlement along a railway station on the Boyne City Railroad. The Moore station served as a connector route to the Grand Rapids and Indiana Railroad about 0.25 miles (0.40 km) to the east in Boyne Falls. Cushman, Doyle's Siding, and Moore appear on a 1911 map of Charlevoix County. The area where Moore once stood is now part of Boyne Mountain Resort.

== Geography ==
According to the U.S. Census Bureau, Boyne Valley Township has a total area of 35.45 square miles (91.82 km^{2}), of which 34.78 square miles (90.08 km^{2}) is land and 0.67 square miles (1.74 km^{2}) (1.89%) is water.

The Boyne River flows through the township.

=== Major highways ===
- US 131 runs south–north through the center of the township.
- M-75 enters the township through the west and terminates at US 131 in the village of Boyne Falls.
- C-48 runs west–east under various local names and also briefly runs concurrently with M-75 and US 131.
- C-73 forms a portion of the southwestern boundary of the township.

== Demographics ==
Historical population
Census	Pop.	Note	%±
2000	1,215		—
2010	1,195		−1.6%
2020	1,425		19.2%

As of the census of 2000, there were 1,215 people, 495 households, and 335 families residing in the township. The population density was 34.6 inhabitants per square mile (13.4/km^{2}). There were 653 housing units at an average density of 18.6 per square mile (7.2/km^{2}). The racial makeup of the township was 97.78% White, 1.56% Native American, 0.16% Asian, 0.08% Pacific Islander, 0.08% from other races, and 0.33% from two or more races. Hispanic or Latino of any race were 0.41% of the population.

There were 495 households, out of which 30.5% had children under the age of 18 living with them, 55.8% were married couples living together, 7.1% had a female householder with no husband present, and 32.3% were non-families. 28.3% of all households were made up of individuals, and 12.1% had someone living alone who was 65 years of age or older. The average household size was 2.44 and the average family size was 3.01.

In the township the population was spread out, with 25.1% under the age of 18, 7.5% from 18 to 24, 29.7% from 25 to 44, 23.1% from 45 to 64, and 14.6% who were 65 years of age or older. The median age was 38 years. For every 100 females, there were 102.2 males. For every 100 females age 18 and over, there were 101.8 males.

The median income for a household in the township was $38,167, and the median income for a family was $45,750. Males had a median income of $35,870 versus $21,944 for females. The per capita income for the township was $16,805. About 3.8% of families and 6.4% of the population were below the poverty line, including 6.7% of those under age 18 and 7.3% of those age 65 or over.

== Education ==
Boyne Valley Township is served by two separate school districts. The majority of the township is served by Boyne Falls Public School District, which has its main campus within the township. Small portions of the western edge of the township are served by Boyne City Public Schools to the northwest in Boyne City.
