= Lakes of the North, Michigan =

Locality in Michigan, United States

- Census-designated place (CDP) & unincorporated community Association
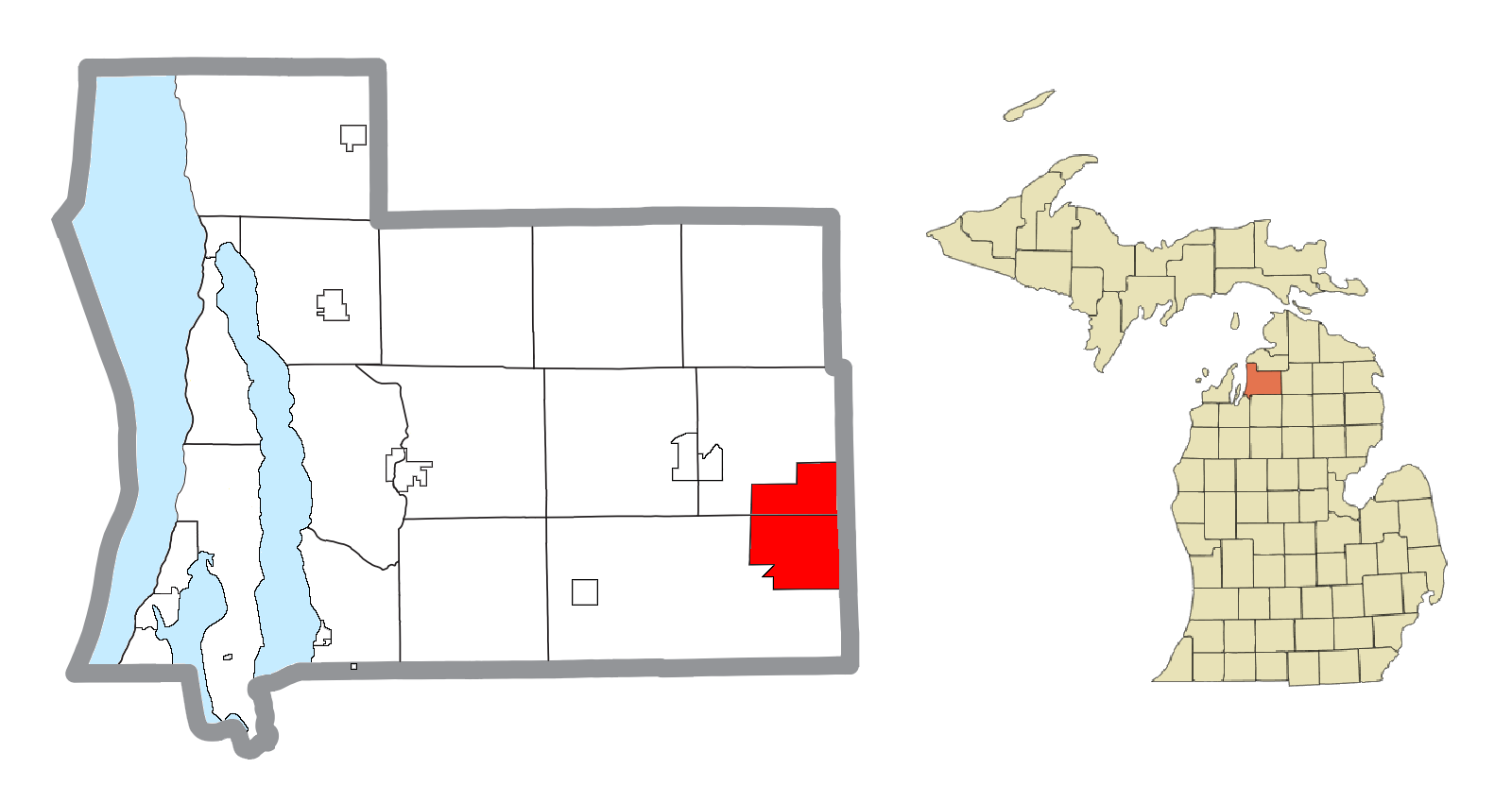
- Location within Antrim County

- Location within the state of Michigan Lakes of the North (the United States)
- Coordinates: 44°55′48″N 84°53′06″W
- Country: United States
- State: Michigan
- County: Antrim
- Townships: Mancelona and Star

Area
  - Total: 16.73 sq mi (43.33 km^{2})
  - Land: 16.58 sq mi (42.94 km^{2})
  - Water: 0.15 sq mi (0.39 km^{2})
- Elevation: 1,289 ft (393 m)

Population (2020)
  - Total: 1,044
  - Density: 63.0/sq mi (24.31/km^{2})
- Time zone: UTC-5 (Eastern (EST))
  - Summer (DST): UTC-4 (EDT)
- ZIP code(s): 49659 (Mancelona)
- Area code: 231
- FIPS code: 26-45070
- GNIS feature ID: 2583747

Lakes of the North is an unincorporated community and census-designated place (CDP) in Antrim County in the U.S. state of Michigan. The CDP is located in Mancelona Township to the south and Star Township to the north. The population of the CDP was 1,044 at the 2020 census.

== History ==
The community of Lakes of the North was listed as a newly organized census-designated place for the 2010 census, meaning it now has officially defined boundaries and population statistics for the first time.

== Geography ==
According to the U.S. Census Bureau, the Lakes of the North CDP has a total area of 16.73 square miles (43.33 km^{2}), of which 16.58 square miles (42.94 km^{2}) is land and 0.15 square miles (0.39 km^{2}) (0.90%) is water.

== Demographics ==
Historical population
Census	Pop.	Note	%±
2010	925		—
2020	1,044		12.9%
U.S. Decennial Census
