= Hayes Township, Otsego County, Michigan =

Hayes Township, Michigan
- Civil township
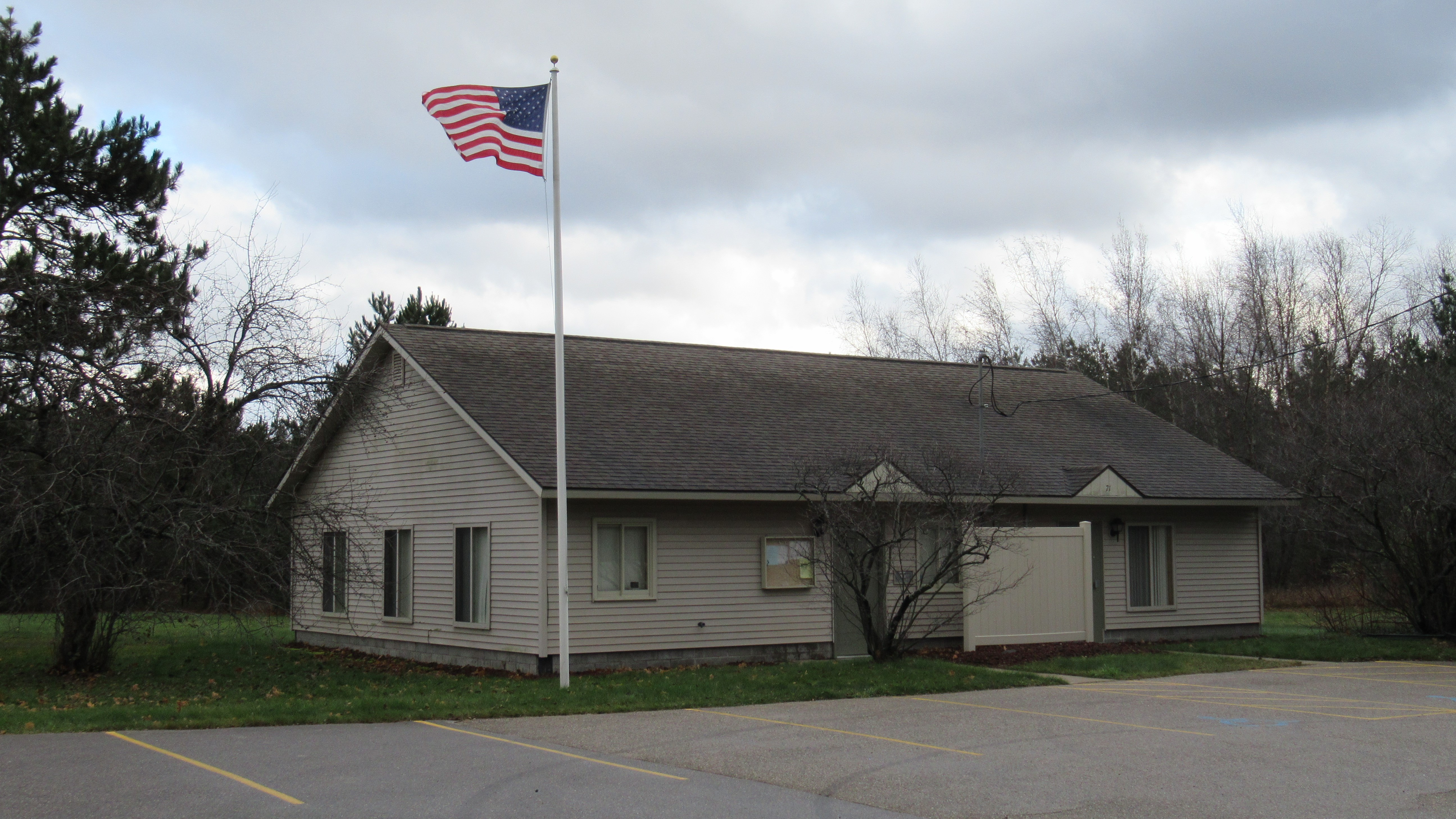
- Hayes Township Hall

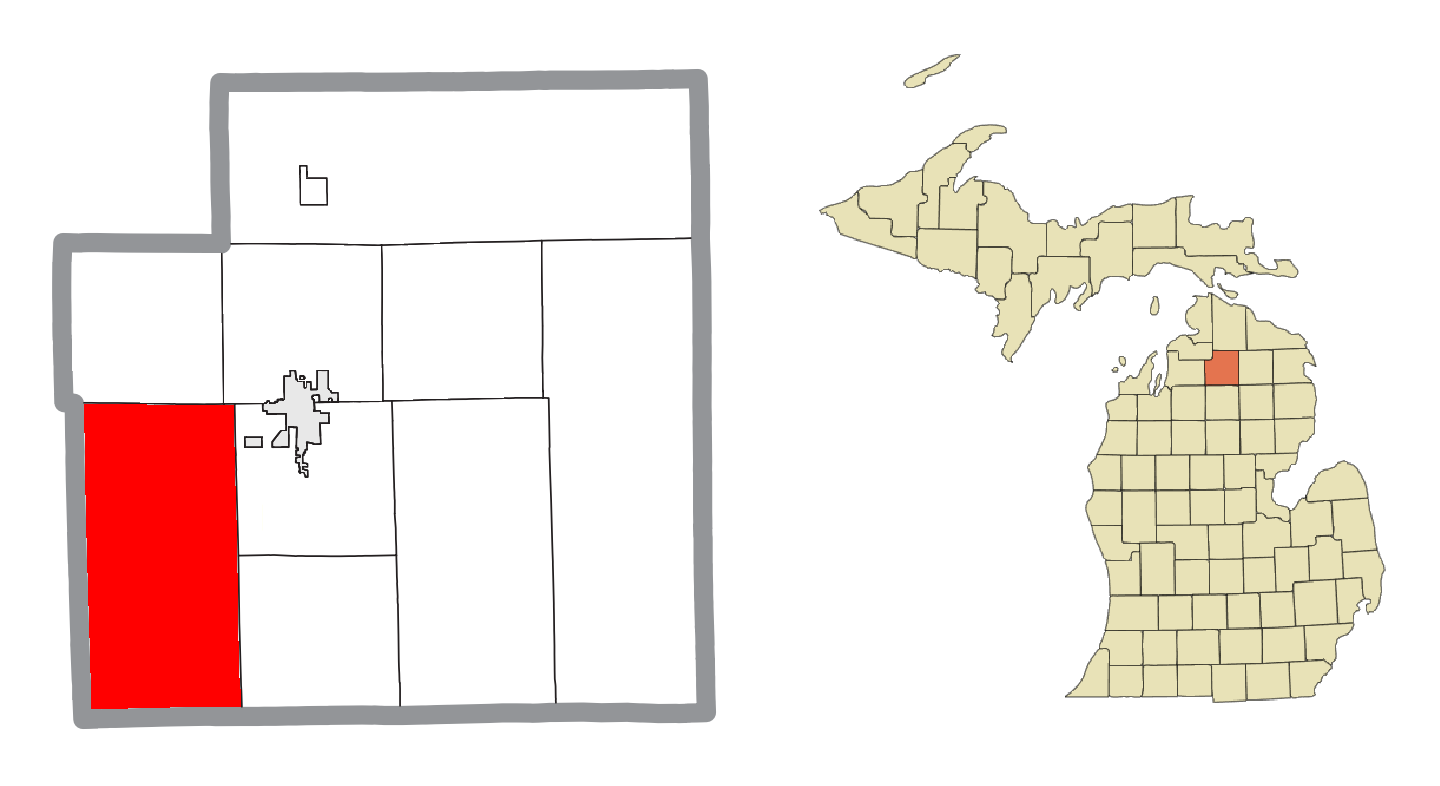
- Location within Otsego County

- Location within the state of Michigan Location within the United States
- Coordinates: 44°56′57″N 84°47′56″W
- Country: United States
- State: Michigan
- County: Otsego
- Established: 1877

Government
  - Supervisor: Mary Sanders
  - Clerk: Richard Ross

Area
  - Total: 70.64 sq mi (182.96 km^{2})
  - Land: 69.15 sq mi (179.10 km^{2})
  - Water: 1.49 sq mi (3.86 km^{2})
- Elevation: 1,421 ft (433 m)

Population (2020)
  - Total: 2,725
  - Density: 39.41/sq mi (15.21/km^{2})
- Time zone: UTC-5 (Eastern (EST))
  - Summer (DST): UTC-4 (EDT)
- ZIP code(s): 49730 (Elmira); 49733 (Frederic); 49735 (Gaylord)
- Area code: 989
- FIPS code: 26-37360
- GNIS feature ID: 1626455

Hayes Township is a civil township of Otsego County in the U.S. state of Michigan. The population was 2,725 at the 2020 census.

== Geography ==
According to the U.S. Census Bureau, the township has a total area of 70.64 square miles (182.96 km^{2}), of which 69.15 square miles (179.10 km^{2}) is land and 1.49 square miles (3.86 km^{2}) (2.11%) is water.

== Demographics ==
As of the census of 2000, there were 2,385 people, 846 households, and 693 families residing in the township. The population density was 34.7 inhabitants per square mile (13.4/km^{2}). There were 1,303 housing units at an average density of 18.9 per square mile (7.3/km^{2}). The racial makeup of the township was 97.53% White, 0.25% African American, 0.84% Native American, 0.38% Asian, 0.17% Pacific Islander, 0.17% from other races, and 0.67% from two or more races. Hispanic or Latino of any race were 0.75% of the population.

There were 846 households, out of which 41.6% had children under the age of 18 living with them, 73.8% were married couples living together, 5.1% had a female householder with no husband present, and 18.0% were non-families. 13.7% of all households were made up of individuals, and 4.1% had someone living alone who was 65 years of age or older. The average household size was 2.80 and the average family size was 3.07.

In the township the population was spread out, with 29.3% under the age of 18, 5.7% from 18 to 24, 31.9% from 25 to 44, 23.6% from 45 to 64, and 9.5% who were 65 years of age or older. The median age was 36 years. For every 100 females, there were 104.4 males. For every 100 females age 18 and over, there were 102.5 males.

The median income for a household in the township was $42,969, and the median income for a family was $45,000. Males had a median income of $34,167 versus $21,220 for females. The per capita income for the township was $17,587. About 4.2% of families and 5.6% of the population were below the poverty line, including 5.8% of those under age 18 and 3.7% of those age 65 or over.
