= Boyne Falls, Michigan =

- Village
- Village of Boyne Falls
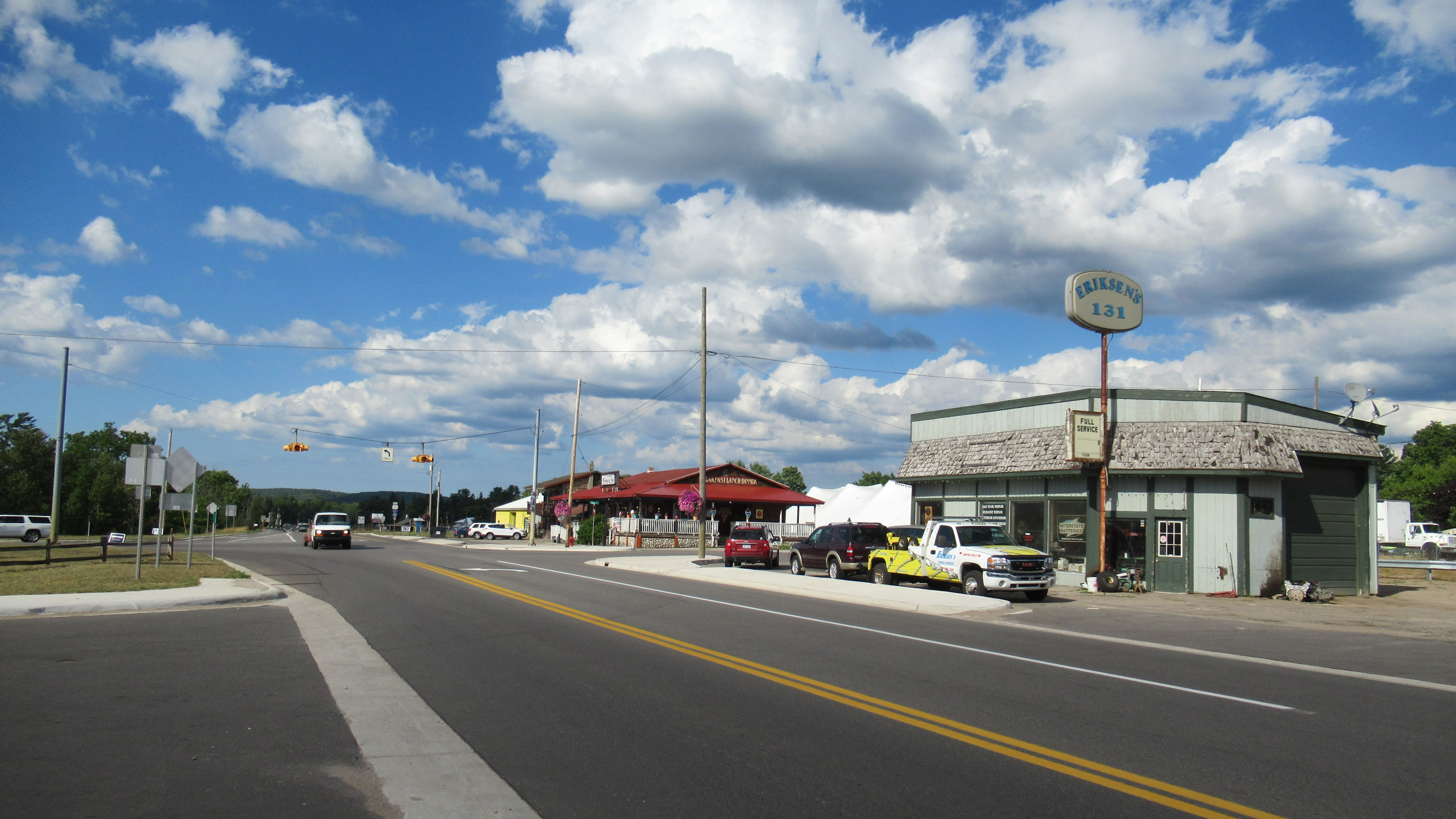
- Looking north along U.S. Route 131

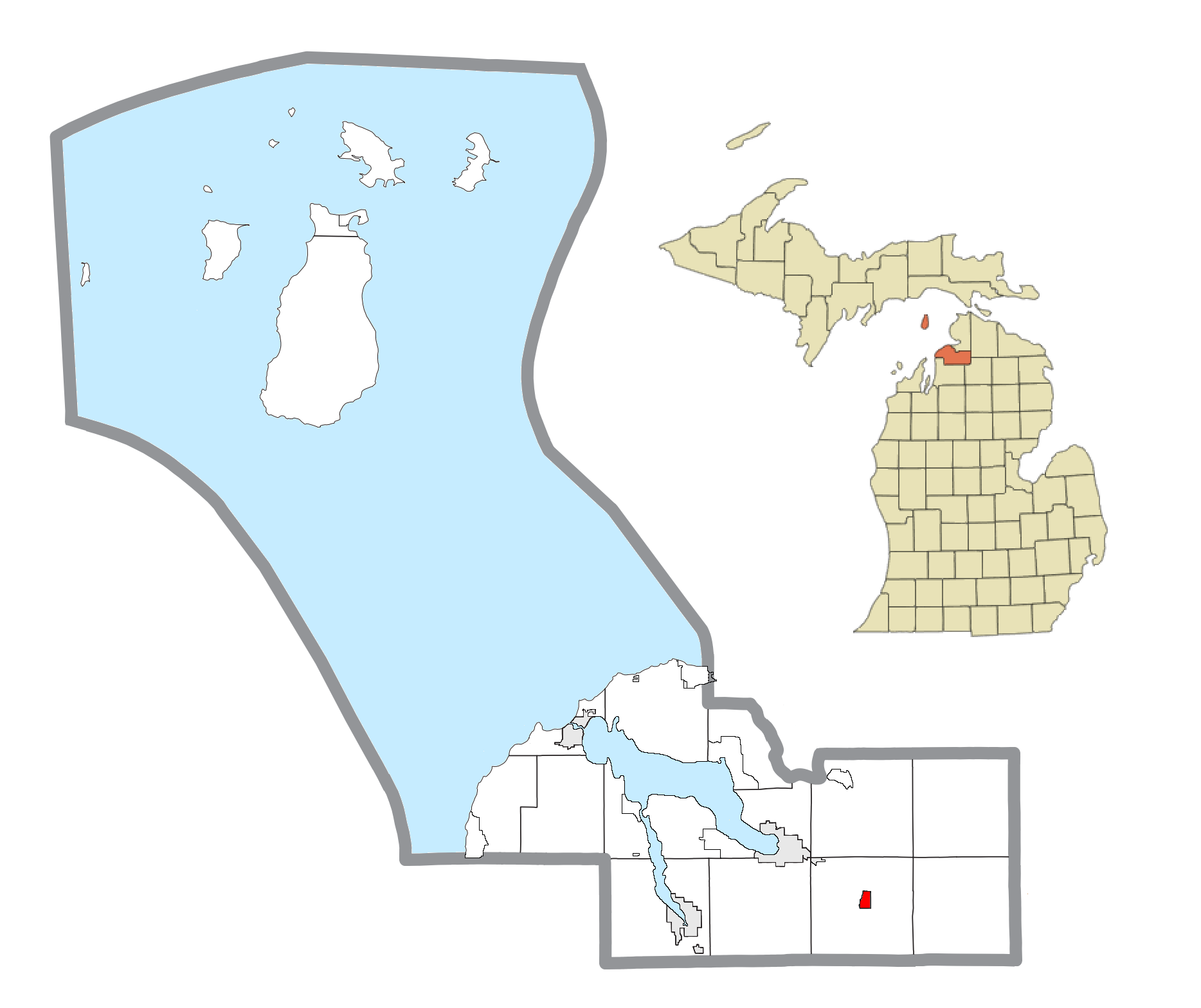
- Location within Charlevoix County

- Location within the state of Michigan Location within the United States
- Coordinates: 45°10′03″N 84°54′45″W
- Country: United States
- State: Michigan
- County: Charlevoix
- Township: Boyne Valley
- Settled: 1874
- Incorporated: 1893

Government
  - Type: Village council
  - President: William Carson

Area
  - Total: 0.57 sq mi (1.47 km^{2})
  - Land: 0.56 sq mi (1.45 km^{2})
  - Water: 0.0077 sq mi (0.02 km^{2})
- Elevation: 722 ft (220 m)

Population (2020)
  - Total: 358
  - Density: 637.5/sq mi (246.14/km^{2})
- Time zone: UTC-5 (Eastern (EST))
  - Summer (DST): UTC-4 (EDT)
- ZIP code(s): 49713
- Area code: 231
- FIPS code: 26-09840
- GNIS feature ID: 2398158
- Website: https://www.boynefallsvillage.com/

Boyne Falls is a village in Charlevoix County in the U.S. state of Michigan. The population was 358 at the 2020 census and the village is located within Boyne Valley Township.

== History ==
Boyne Falls was first settled with the arrival of the Grand Rapids and Indiana Railroad in 1874. In the same year, A. D. Carpenter built the first store. A post office opened in Boyne Falls on September 5, 1874, with William Nelson serving as the first postmaster. The community was named by John Miller after the Boyne River, which has a nearby set of waterfalls. Boyne River's name is from a river near Dublin. Boyne Falls incorporated as a village in 1893.

The railway line is operated by the Great Lakes Central Railroad, although the station in Boyne Falls has been closed since 1973.

The largest lake in Boyne Falls is Thumb Lake (Lake Louise) and the surface area of the lake is approximately 510 acre. The shoreline distance, including islands is roughly 7.5 miles. The deepest point is located in the west end of the lake and is reportedly 152 feet deep. The residents of the lake area form the Lake Louise Christian Community. Boyne Falls is home to two Christian summer camps; Higher Ground at Lake Louise (formerly Lake Louise Baptist Camp) and Lake Louise Christian Community (affiliated with the Methodist church). The village is home to the annual Boyne Falls Polish Festival, which happens in the first week of August. The 48th annual festival was in 2023.

== Geography ==
According to the U.S. Census Bureau, the village has a total area of 0.57 square miles (1.48 km^{2}), of which 0.56 square miles (1.45 km^{2}) is land and 0.01 square miles (0.03 km^{2}) (1.75%) is water. Boyne Mountain Resort is a ski area located just southeast of the village limits near Boyne Mountain Airport. The village is located along the Boyne River, near the junction of the river's north and south branches.

=== Major highways ===
- US 131 runs south–north through the western portion of the village.
- M-75 enters the village briefly and its southern terminus is at US 131.
- C-48 is a county-designated highway which runs concurrently with M-75 and then US 131 before turning east on Thumb Lake Road at the northern border of the village.

=== Climate ===
This climatic region is typified by large seasonal temperature differences, with warm to hot (and often humid) summers and cold (sometimes severely cold) winters. According to the Köppen Climate Classification system, Boyne Falls has a humid continental climate, abbreviated "Dfb" on climate maps.

Climate data for Boyne Falls, Michigan (1991–2020 normals, extremes 1961–present)
Month	Jan	Feb	Mar	Apr	May	Jun	Jul	Aug	Sep	Oct	Nov	Dec	Year
Record high °F (°C)	56 (13)	65 (18)	87 (31)	89 (32)	95 (35)	102 (39)	102 (39)	100 (38)	96 (36)	91 (33)	78 (26)	66 (19)	102 (39)
Mean daily maximum °F (°C)	28.4 (−2.0)	31.5 (−0.3)	42.4 (5.8)	55.8 (13.2)	70.2 (21.2)	79.7 (26.5)	83.5 (28.6)	81.7 (27.6)	73.8 (23.2)	59.3 (15.2)	44.6 (7.0)	33.4 (0.8)	57.0 (13.9)
Daily mean °F (°C)	21.2 (−6.0)	22.5 (−5.3)	31.5 (−0.3)	43.6 (6.4)	56.7 (13.7)	66.5 (19.2)	70.8 (21.6)	69.4 (20.8)	62.1 (16.7)	49.6 (9.8)	37.5 (3.1)	27.4 (−2.6)	46.6 (8.1)
Mean daily minimum °F (°C)	14.1 (−9.9)	13.4 (−10.3)	20.6 (−6.3)	31.5 (−0.3)	43.1 (6.2)	53.3 (11.8)	58.1 (14.5)	57.0 (13.9)	50.4 (10.2)	39.9 (4.4)	30.3 (−0.9)	21.5 (−5.8)	36.1 (2.3)
Record low °F (°C)	−32 (−36)	−35 (−37)	−25 (−32)	−6 (−21)	17 (−8)	27 (−3)	32 (0)	28 (−2)	22 (−6)	15 (−9)	−3 (−19)	−26 (−32)	−35 (−37)
Average precipitation inches (mm)	2.65 (67)	1.67 (42)	1.89 (48)	3.06 (78)	3.19 (81)	3.16 (80)	2.86 (73)	3.46 (88)	3.85 (98)	4.44 (113)	3.31 (84)	2.68 (68)	36.22 (920)
Average snowfall inches (cm)	32.0 (81)	20.4 (52)	11.2 (28)	4.7 (12)	0.1 (0.25)	0.0 (0.0)	0.0 (0.0)	0.0 (0.0)	0.0 (0.0)	0.7 (1.8)	11.4 (29)	31.2 (79)	111.7 (284)
Average precipitation days (≥ 0.01 in)	17.0	12.1	9.9	11.0	11.4	9.4	9.5	9.2	11.3	15.2	14.4	16.3	146.7
Average snowy days (≥ 0.1 in)	13.5	9.7	5.3	2.0	0.0	0.0	0.0	0.0	0.0	0.5	5.3	11.3	47.6
Source: NOAA

== Demographics ==
Historical population
Census	Pop.	Note	%±
1900	431		—
1910	325		−24.6%
1920	241		−25.8%
1930	199		−17.4%
1940	213		7.0%
1950	236		10.8%
1960	260		10.2%
1970	347		33.5%
1980	378		8.9%
1990	369		−2.4%
2000	370		0.3%
2010	294		−20.5%
2020	358		21.8%
U.S. Decennial Census

=== 2010 census ===
As of the census of 2010, there were 294 people, 133 households, and 80 families living in the village. The population density was 534.5 inhabitants per square mile (206.4/km^{2}). There were 178 housing units at an average density of 323.6 per square mile (124.9/km^{2}). The racial makeup of the village was 95.2% White, 0.7% African American, 1.0% Native American, 0.3% Asian, and 2.7% from two or more races. Hispanic or Latino of any race were 0.7% of the population.

There were 133 households, of which 27.8% had children under the age of 18 living with them, 39.1% were married couples living together, 15.0% had a female householder with no husband present, 6.0% had a male householder with no wife present, and 39.8% were non-families. 33.8% of all households were made up of individuals, and 15% had someone living alone who was 65 years of age or older. The average household size was 2.21 and the average family size was 2.73. The median age in the village was 41.7 years. 20.7% of residents were under the age of 18; 10.6% were between the ages of 18 and 24; 23.4% were from 25 to 44; 32% were from 45 to 64; and 13.3% were 65 years of age or older. The gender makeup of the village was 47.3% male and 52.7% female.

=== 2000 census ===
As of the census of 2000, there were 370 people, 158 households, and 97 families residing in the village. The population density was 675.9 inhabitants per square mile (261.0/km^{2}). There were 190 housing units at an average density of 347.1 per square mile (134.0/km^{2}). The racial makeup of the village was 97.84% White, 1.35% Native American, 0.27% Asian, and 0.54% from two or more races. Hispanic or Latino of any race were 0.27% of the population.

There were 158 households, out of which 31.6% had children under the age of 18 living with them, 44.3% were married couples living together, 10.1% had a female householder with no husband present, and 38.0% were non-families. 32.3% of all households were made up of individuals, and 11.4% had someone living alone who was 65 years of age or older. The average household size was 2.34 and the average family size was 2.96. In the village, the population was spread out, with 25.4% under the age of 18, 10.8% from 18 to 24, 34.1% from 25 to 44, 17.6% from 45 to 64, and 12.2% who were 65 years of age or older. The median age was 34 years. For every 100 females, there were 96.8 males. For every 100 females age 18 and over, there were 102.9 males.

The median income for a household in the village was $32,143, and the median income for a family was $40,250. Males had a median income of $34,167 versus $16,103 for females. The per capita income for the village was $15,027. About 4.5% of families and 10.3% of the population were below the poverty line, including 5.9% of those under age 18 and 17.9% of those age 65 or over.

== Education ==
The village of Boyne Falls is served by the school district, Boyne Falls Public School District, which serves portions of several adjacent townships. The district is headquartered in the village and its main campus is located nearby to the west along M-75.

== Images ==
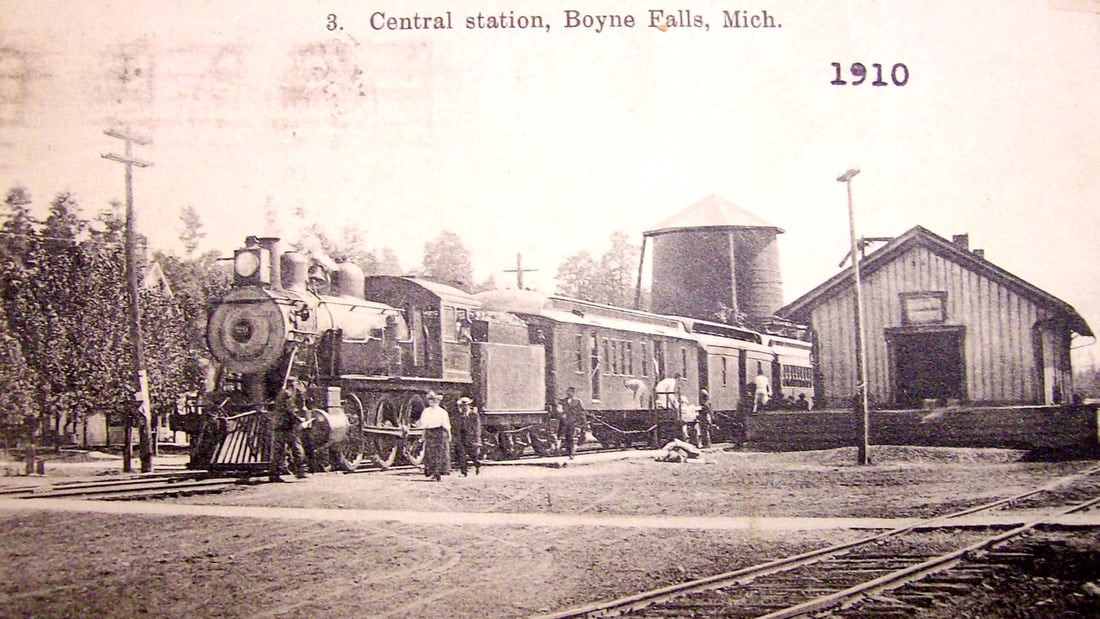
Historic image of the Boyne Falls train station

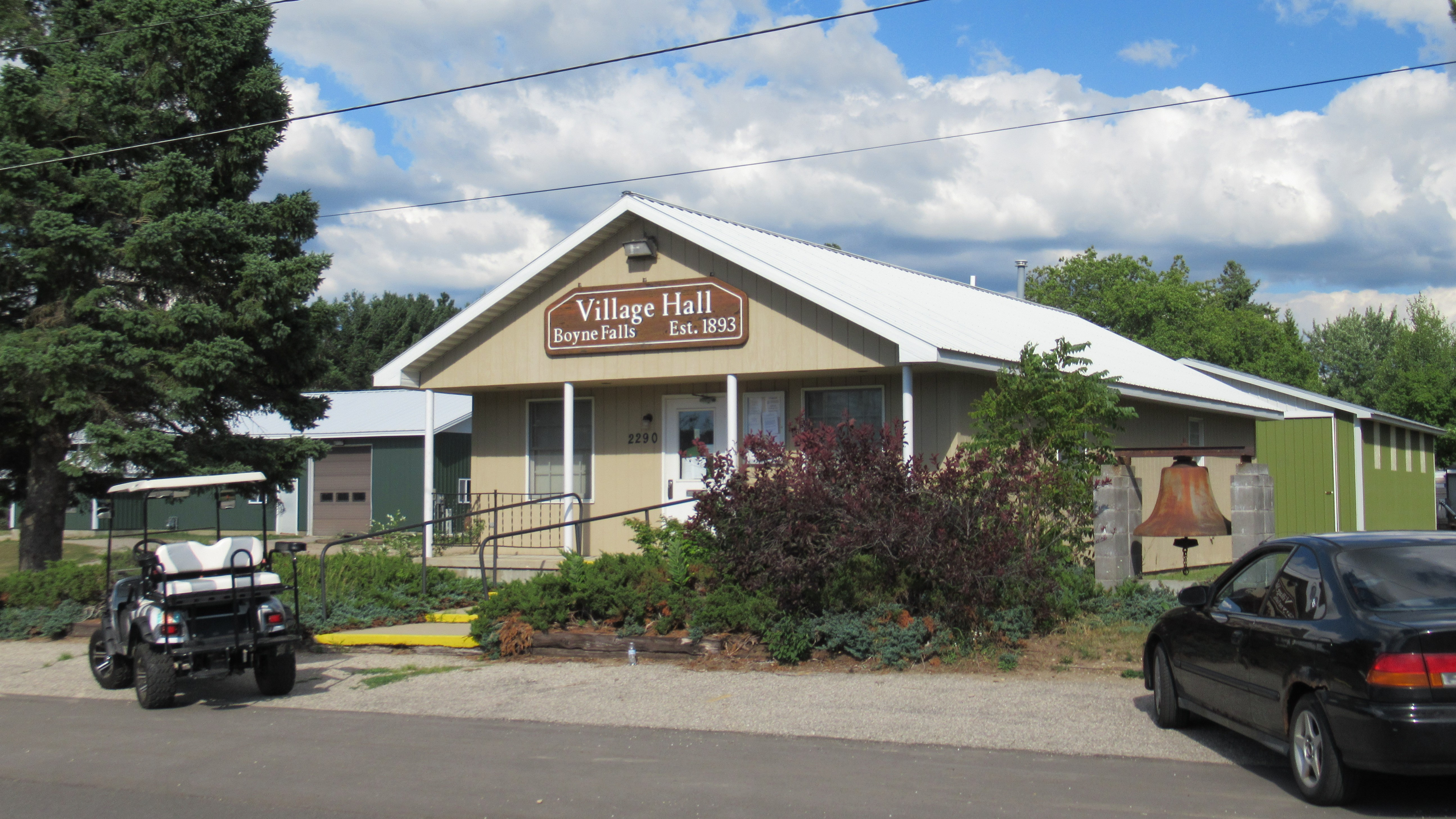
Boyne Falls Village Hall

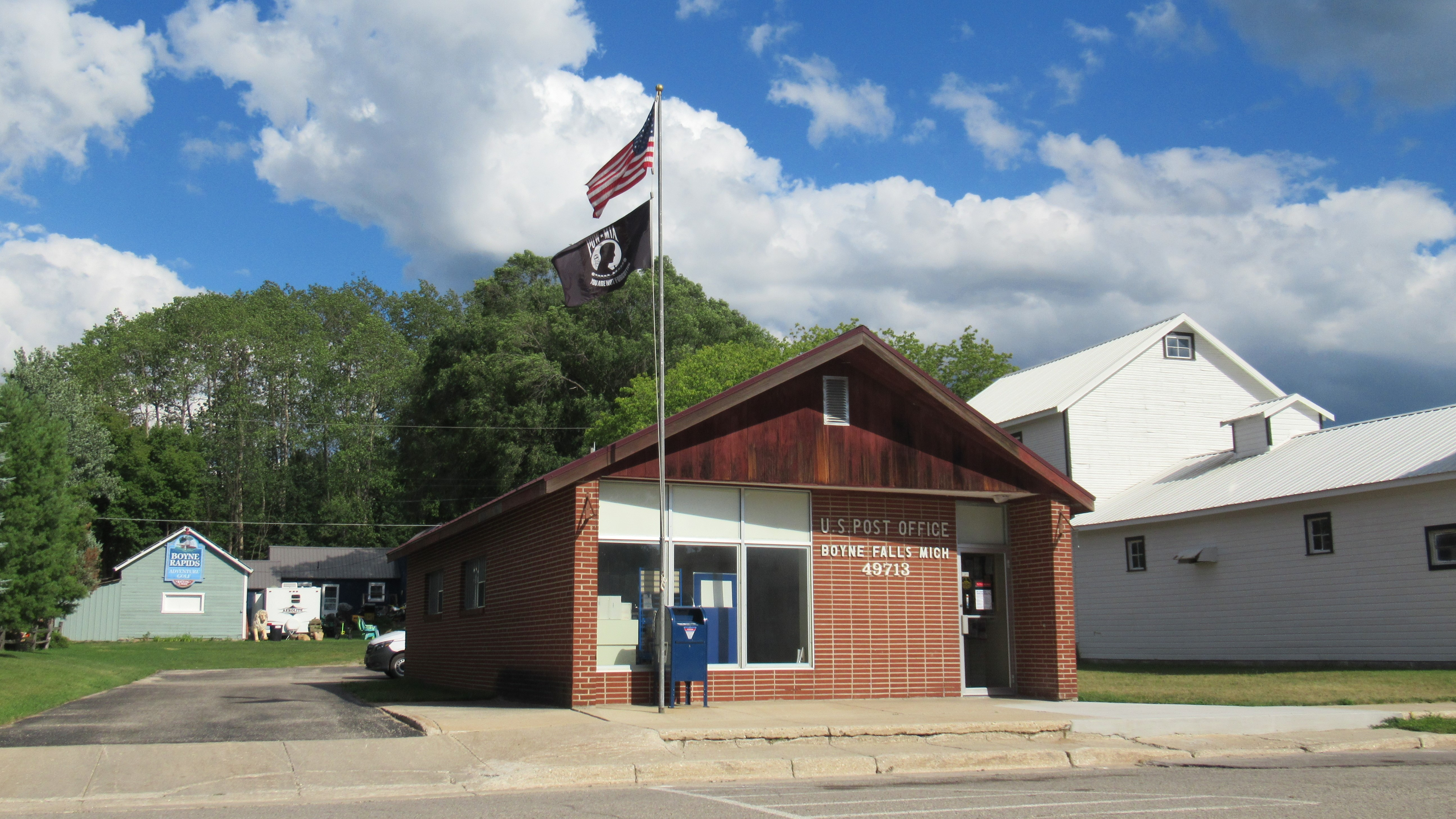
U.S. Post Office in Boyne Falls

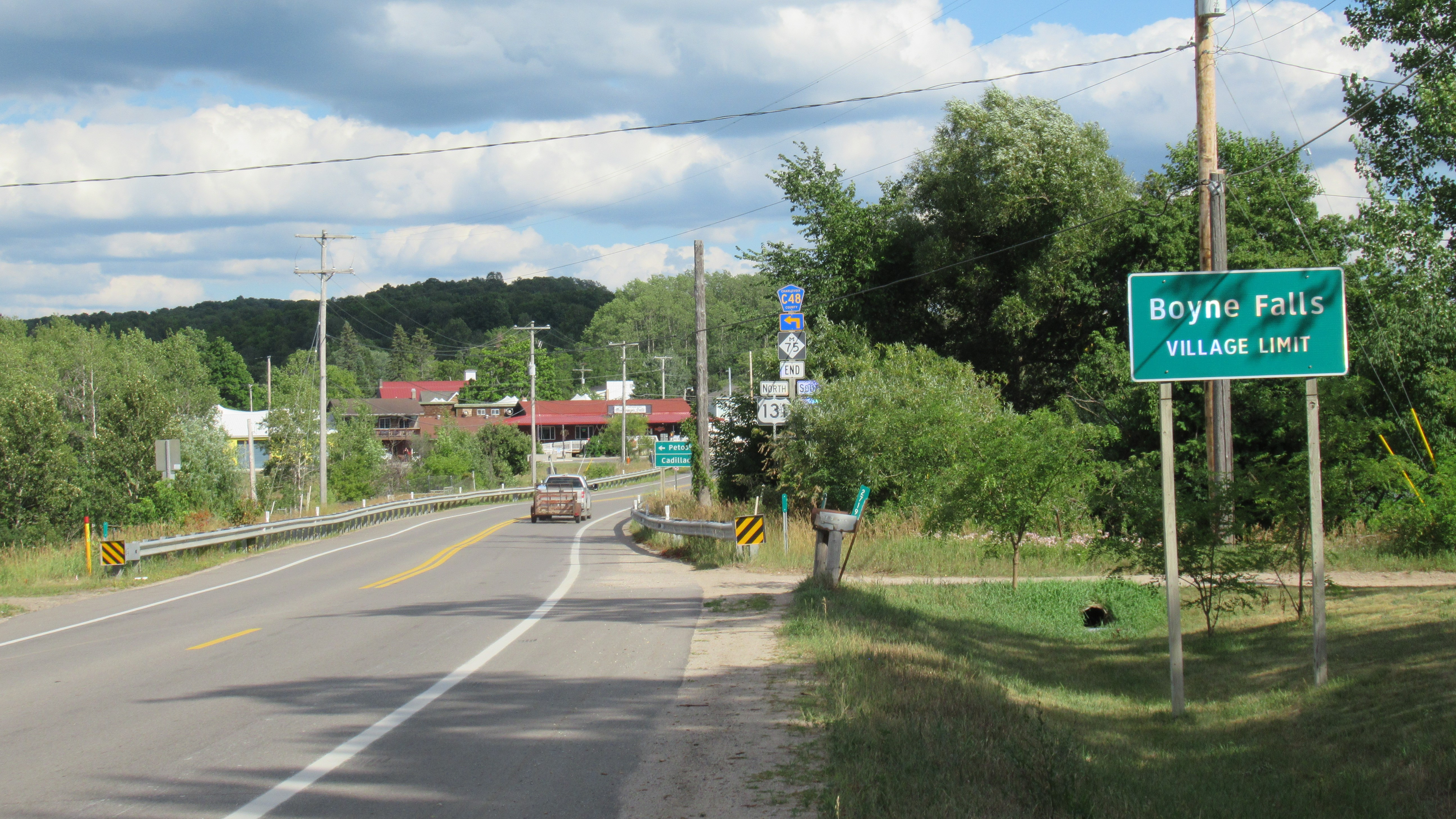
Road signage along M-75 / C-48
