= Torch Lake Township, Antrim County, Michigan =

Torch Lake Township, Michigan
- Civil township
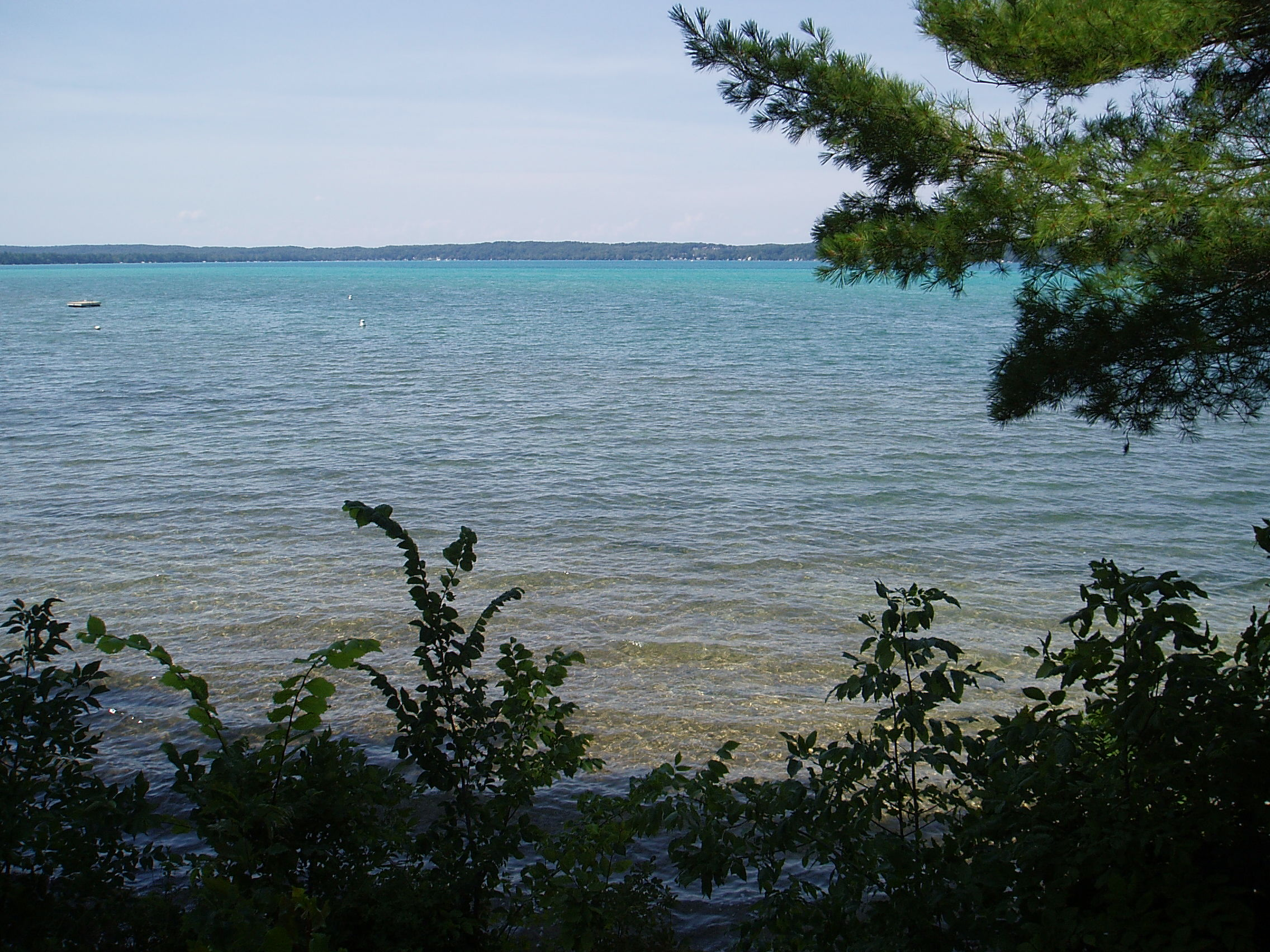
- View of Torch Lake

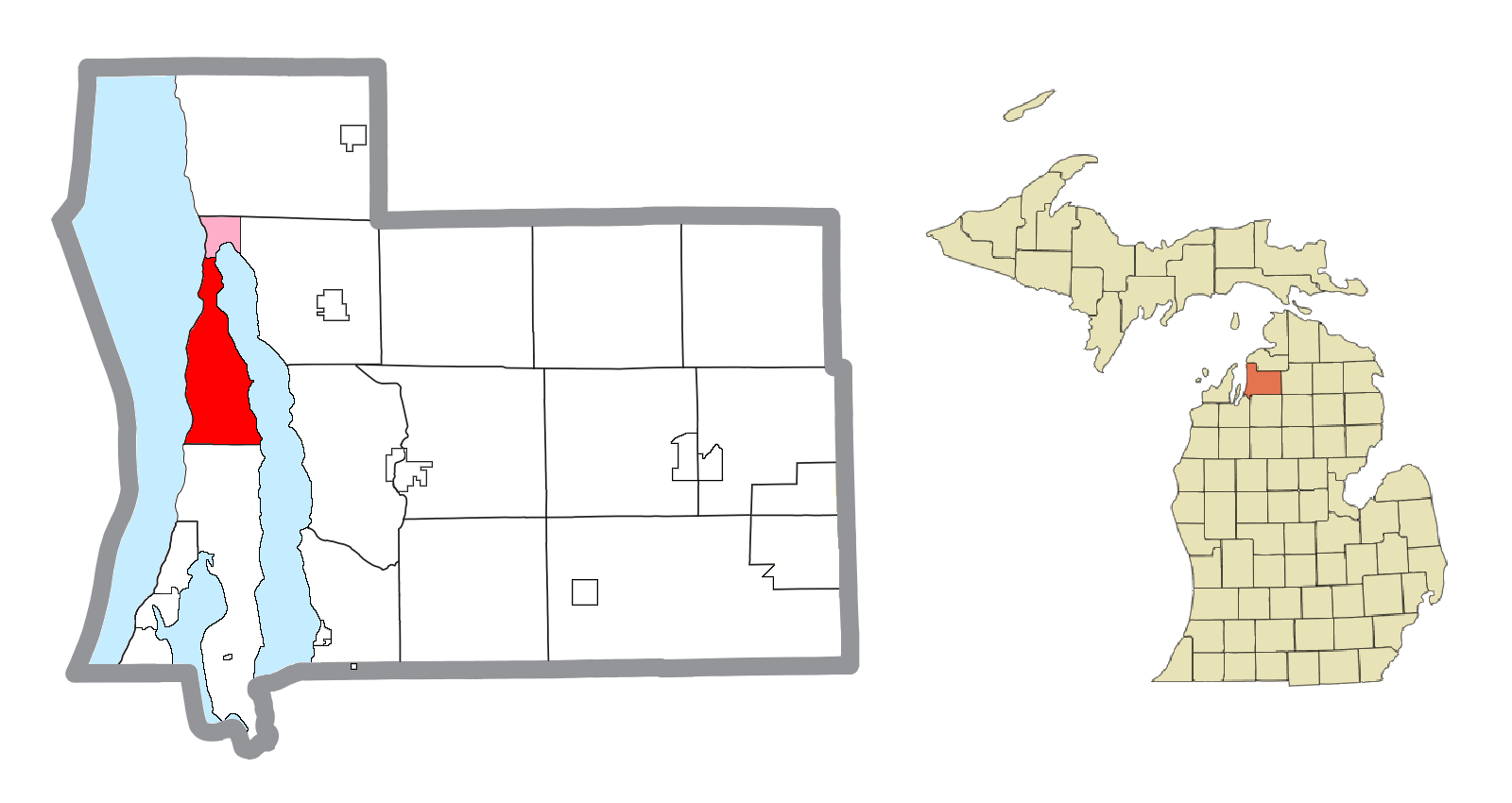
- Location within Antrim County (red) and the administered community of Eastport (pink)

- Location within the state of Michigan Torch Lake Township (the United States)
- Coordinates: 45°02′47″N 85°20′56″W
- Country: United States
- State: Michigan
- County: Antrim

Government
  - Supervisor: Robert Cook
  - Clerk: Kathy Windiate

Area
  - Total: 21.1 sq mi (54.7 km^{2})
  - Land: 15.1 sq mi (39.1 km^{2})
  - Water: 6.0 sq mi (15.6 km^{2})
- Elevation: 673 ft (205 m)

Population (2020)
  - Total: 1,212
  - Density: 79.1/sq mi (30.5/km^{2})
- Time zone: UTC-5 (Eastern (EST))
  - Summer (DST): UTC-4 (EDT)
- ZIP code(s): 49622 (Central Lake); 49627 (Eastport); 49648 (Kewadin)
- Area code: 231
- FIPS code: 26-80100
- GNIS feature ID: 1627169
- Website: Official website

Torch Lake Township is a civil township of Antrim County in the U.S. state of Michigan. Located in the Northern Lower Peninsula, the township comprises an isthmus between the eponymous Torch Lake and Grand Traverse Bay, a bay of Lake Michigan. As of the 2020 census, the township population was 1,212, a slight increase from 1,194 at the 2010 census.

== Communities ==
- Creswell is a ghost town in central Torch Lake Township at 45°1′10″N 85°21′9″W. Creswell was settled in 1852, and was awarded a post office in 1869, operating until 1904.
- Eastport is a small unincorporated community located at the northern end of Torch Lake at 45°06′26″N 85°21′00″W. It was first settled by woodsman Murdock Anress in 1863. A hotel was built by Mr. Phillips in 1869. A post office name "Wilson" was established in March 1872 and renamed "Eastport" in September 1873. The name was an analog to the village of Northport on the opposite side of the Grand Traverse Bay, but the bay shore project was abandoned and the village developed at the northern end of Torch Lake.
- Torch Lake is a small unincorporated community on US Route 31 along the northwest shore of Torch Lake at 45°04′31″N 85°21′31″W.

== Geography ==
According to the United States Census Bureau, the township has a total area of 21.1 square miles (54.7 km^{2}), of which 15.1 square miles (39.1 km^{2}) is land and 6.0 square miles (15.6 km^{2}), or 28.48%, is water.

=== Major highways ===
- US 31 runs north–south through the center of the township. North of Torch Lake Township, US 31 runs through Charlevoix and Petoskey, and to the south, through Elk Rapids and Traverse City.
- M-88 is an east–west highway with its western terminus in Torch Lake Township, at US Route 31. The highway runs southeasterly through Central Lake and Bellaire before ending at US 131 and M-66 in Mancelona.

== Demographics ==
As of the census of 2000, there were 1,159 people, 498 households, and 377 families residing in the township. The population density was 76.3 inhabitants per square mile (29.5/km^{2}). There were 1,134 housing units at an average density of 74.6 per square mile (28.8/km^{2}). The racial makeup of the township was 96.98% White, 0.78% African American, 0.17% Native American, 0.09% Asian, 0.95% from other races, and 1.04% from two or more races. Hispanic or Latino of any race were 2.50% of the population.

There were 498 households, out of which 19.3% had children under the age of 18 living with them, 70.9% were married couples living together, 3.4% had a female householder with no husband present, and 24.1% were non-families. 20.9% of all households were made up of individuals, and 11.2% had someone living alone who was 65 years of age or older. The average household size was 2.32 and the average family size was 2.66.

In the township the population was spread out, with 18.1% under the age of 18, 4.7% from 18 to 24, 17.5% from 25 to 44, 32.2% from 45 to 64, and 27.5% who were 65 years of age or older. The median age was 52 years. For every 100 females, there were 104.4 males. For every 100 females age 18 and over, there were 100.6 males.

The median income for a household in the township was $43,816, and the median income for a family was $47,500. Males had a median income of $32,212 versus $30,313 for females. The per capita income for the township was $24,984. About 4.8% of families and 9.4% of the population were below the poverty line, including 25.0% of those under age 18 and 3.2% of those age 65 or over.
