= ACB =

ACB may refer to:

== Organizations ==
=== Banks ===
- African Central Bank, one of the three financial institutions of the African Union
- Asia Commercial Bank, a commercial bank in Vietnam

=== Sports bodies ===
- Afghanistan Cricket Board, the governing body for professional and amateur cricket in Afghanistan
- Asociación de Clubs de Baloncesto, governing body of principal basketball league in Spain
- Absolute Championship Berkut, a mixed martial arts, kickboxing, and Brazilian jiu-jitsu promotion based in Russia
- Liga ACB, the top professional basketball division of the Spanish basketball league system
- Australian Cricket Board, the management for all international and domestic cricket in Australia (the board also manages the Australian Men's and Australian Women's team)

=== Other organizations ===
- American Council of the Blind, a nationwide organization in the US
- Amphibious Construction Battalion of the US Navy
- Anti-Corruption Bureau, Andhra Pradesh, India
- ASEAN Centre for Biodiversity, an intergovernmental organization
- Association for Clinical Biochemistry and Laboratory Medicine, the British professional body for clinical biochemists, a member of the Science Council
- Aurora Cannabis, whose stock is publicly traded under the ticker symbol ACB
- Australian Classification Board, Australia's statutory censorship and classification body

== People ==
- Amy Coney Barrett, Associate Justice of the US Supreme Court

== Places ==
- Airport City Belgrade
- Antrim County Airport in Bellaire, State of Michigan, US (IATA code ACB)
- Acton Bridge railway station, Cheshire, England, National Rail station code

== Other uses ==
- Adjusted cost base, to calculate the cost of an investment for tax purposes
- Aortocoronary bypass, a medical procedure
- Air circuit breaker
- T Áncá language of Nigeria, which may be the same as the Manta language of Cameroon (ISO 639-3 code acb)
