= Central Lake =

Central Lake may refer to a location in the United States:

- Central Lake, Michigan, a village
- Central Lake Township, Michigan

== See also ==
- Central Lakes, Minnesota
