= Torchport Airport =

Public use airport in Michigan, United States

- IATA: none; ICAO: none; FAA LID: 59M

Summary
- Serves: Eastport, MI
- Built: 1990s
- Elevation AMSL: 640 ft (200 m)
- Coordinates: 45.05487°N 85.3569°W
- Interactive map of Torchport Airport

Runways
Direction	Length		Surface
Direction	ft	m	Surface
9/27	3,000	1,006	Asphalt

Statistics (2021)
- Aircraft Movements: 804

The Torchport Airport, also known as the Torchport Airpark, (FAA LID: 59M) is a privately owned, public use airport located three miles south of Eastport, Michigan. It is at an elevation of 640 ft (195 m). The airport is located on Torch Lake between Charlevoix and Traverse City.

== History ==
The airport's original owners intended to develop the property into a residential airpark, and the airport was approved as a residential airpark in the 1990s. But the plans failed to come to fruition, so theirs is the only house at the airport. The airport's original owners sold it in 2017 to new owners, who began moving towards building out the airport as a proper airpark.

== Facilities and aircraft ==
The airport has two runways. Runway 9/27 is an asphalt paved 3000 × 75 ft (1006 × 22 m), and runway 4/22 is a turf 2400 × 100 ft (732 × 30 m).

For the 12-month period ending December 31, 2021, the airport has 804 aircraft operations, an average of 67 per month. It is entirely general aviation. For the same time period, there are seven aircraft based on the field: five single-engine airplanes and two ultralights.

== Accidents and incidents ==
- On August 14, 2013, a Taylorcraft BC12-D1 was destroyed when it was consumed by fire after it landed at the Torchport Airport. The pilot stated that he noticed the smell of gasoline while in cruise flight about 5 to 8 miles from the airport. When the airplane entered the traffic pattern on downwind, the smell of the gasoline became much stronger. During the flare, the engine quit, and the pilot could smell a very strong odor that he described as being a burnt metal smell. After landing, he departed the airplane quickly. About 45 seconds later, flames started coming out of the left side of the engine cowl. The fire spread and, within 15 minutes, the fire had consumed most of the airplane. The probable cause of the accident was found to be a fuel leak in the engine compartment and subsequent fire, the source of which could not be determined because of extensive postaccident fire damage.
- On August 15, 2004, a Cessna 182S sustained substantial damage when the nose landing gear collapsed during landing at the Torchport Airport. In a written statement, the pilot stated that during landing, the airplane settled to the ground and then bounced about 2 feet into the air. He stated that airplane came back down and the nose wheel impacted a small depression in the airstrip. He said that he held the nose off of the ground for about another 60 to 100 yards before the airplane settled onto the engine cowl. The probable cause of the accident was found to be the pilot misjudging the landing flare resulting in the hard landing and his unsuccessful remedial action following the bounced landing.

== See also ==
- List of airports in Michigan
