= Henry Richardi House =

Historic house in Michigan, United States

- U.S. National Register of Historic Places
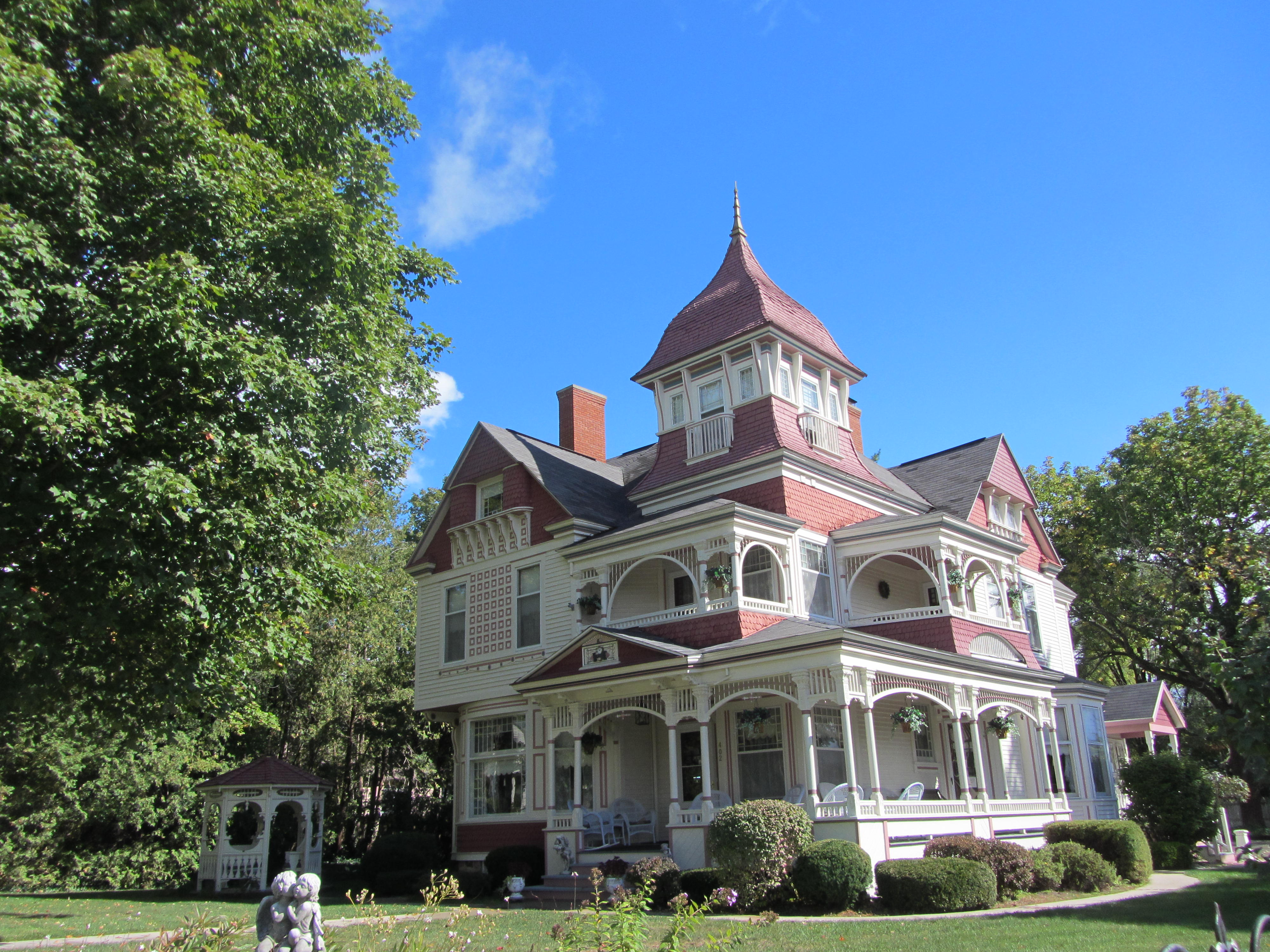

- Location within Michigan Location within the United States
- Interactive map
- Location: 402 N. Bridge St., Bellaire, Michigan
- Coordinates: 44°58′49″N 85°12′37″W
- Area: less than one acre
- Built: 1895
- Architectural style: Late Victorian, Queen Anne, Picturesque Eclectic Style
- NRHP reference No.: 78001491
- Added to NRHP: January 18, 1978

The Henry Richardi House is located at 402 North Bridge Street in Bellaire, Michigan. It was originally built for Henry Richardi, a late 19th century lumber baron and industrialist, reportedly in an attempt to woo a young woman for a wife. It currently operates as the "Grand Victorian Bed and Breakfast." It was listed on the National Register of Historic Places in 1978.

== History ==
Henry Richardi was born in Williamsport, Pennsylvania in 1863, the son of Robert and Louisa Richardi. When Henry was young, his family moved to Louisiana, Missouri, where his father started a wooden utensil company. Henry went to school there, and began helping his father in the business. In 1881, Robert Richardi decided that the area around Bellaire was more promising, so the family moved again, and established the company of Richardi & Bechtold (later the Woodenware Company) with Frederick Bechtold.

Henry Richardi continued to work in the business, and in 1895, Robert Richardi sold out to his son. By 1900, the company employed nearly 100 people, but in 1905 a fire destroyed the plant. It was not rebuilt, and Richardi & Bechtold went out of business. Richardi used some of the land to set up an electric plant, supplying electricity to nearby Charlevoix; much of the rest is now a city park.

This house was built in 1895 for Henry Richardi, reportedly in an attempt to woo a young woman for a wife. The house was built by Richardi's employees to reflect the quality of their craftsmanship, and the economic success of Richardi's company.

However, Richardi's marriage plans never came to fruition, and he never lived in the house. Richardi eventually moved to California in 1925. A string of other private owners lived in the Richardi house, and in 1989 it was turned into a bed and breakfast, at the time called the "Richardi House Bed and Breakfast." It currently operates as the "Grand Victorian Bed and Breakfast."

The rich detail of the house has remained remarkably intact.

== Description ==
The Henry Richardi House is a 2 1/2-story asymmetrical wood frame Queen Anne house sitting on a rough stone foundation. The plan includes a number of elegant bays, balconies, and overhangs created by the second-story gables, and a square tower with a curved, pointed roof surmounts the structure. The house is covered with clapboard and scalloped wooden shingles. It features a significant amount of ornamental detail, including lathe-turned beaded latticework and columns.

The interior of the house contains substantial decorative woodwork, with each room featuring a different type of wood. The original hand-carved staircase and light fixtures remain in place and intact.
