= Torch Lake Township, Michigan =

Torch Lake Township is the name of some places in the U.S. state of Michigan:

- Torch Lake Township, Antrim County, Michigan
- Torch Lake Township, Houghton County, Michigan
