= M-88 (Michigan highway) =

State highway in Antrim County, Michigan, United States

M-88
- M-88 highlighted in red

Route information
- Maintained by MDOT
- Length: 26.215 mi (42.189 km)
- Existed: c. July 1, 1919–present

Major junctions
- West end: US 31 in Eastport
- East end: US 131 / M-66 / C-38 in Mancelona

Location
- Country: United States
- State: Michigan
- Counties: Antrim

Highway system
- Michigan State Trunkline Highway System; Interstate; US; State; Byways
| ← M-87 | → M-89 |

M-88 is a state trunkline highway in the U.S. state of Michigan. The highway runs from US Highway 31 (US 31) in Eastport to US 131/M-66 in Mancelona, passing through the villages of Bellaire and Central Lake. The highway is entirely within Antrim County and is known by the street name of "Scenic Highway" outside of the various communities along its routing.

M-88 is an original trunkline dating back to the 1919 signing of the state system. An extension in the 1920s and paving in the late 1930s created the highway as it exists today. The highway was not listed on the National Highway System, nor is it included in the Lake Michigan Circle Tour.

== Route description ==
M-88 starts in the community of Eastport at an intersection four blocks east of the Grand Traverse Bay of Lake Michigan next to Barnes County Park. From its start, it runs east along the northern end of Torch Lake. M-88 zig-zags south and east along Scenic Highway to the community of Central Lake. In Central Lake it runs south along Main Street, following the western shore of Intermediate Lake. South of Intermediate Lake, M-88 crosses the Intermediate River on a historic designation-eligible Depression-era bridge along Bridge Street in Bellaire. This section of M-88 is just west of the Antrim County Airport before the highway turns east on Cayuga Street in downtown and south on Division Street. The Bellaire section of the trunkline is the location of the highest traffic levels along the highway. The Michigan Department of Transportation (MDOT) measures the annual average daily traffic (AADT) in traffic surveys. The 2007 survey showed that 5,200 vehicles used the section of roadway on the average day in Bellaire.

South of Bellaire, M-88 passes the Chief Golf Course and the Legend, Summit and Bellaire golf clubs. M-88 crosses the Shanty Creek, which is the namesake of a resort in the area. South of the Bellaire Golf Club, M-88 turns eastward again, passing south of Schuss Mountain, another resort. This section of trunkline is used by 3,300 vehicles in the 2007 AADT survey. Past Schuss Mountain, M-88 turns east at Alden highway and enters the community of Mancelona, passing the Fairview Cemetery. The highway runs along on State Street into downtown. M-88 ends at an intersection with US 131/M-66 running along Williams Street, and State Street continues eastward as C-38.

== History ==
M-88 was first designated by July 1, 1919 along its current routing between Mancelona and Bellaire. It was extended in 1927 through Central Lake to end in Eastport. It was used as a temporary routing of US 31 between Eastport and Bellaire while the Elk Rapids to Eastport section of US 31 was reconstructed. The first sections of roadway were paved near Bellaire in late 1936. Paving was completed on the entire highway by late 1940 No changes have been made to the highway since. None of the highway was added to the National Highway System, a system of strategically important highways.

== Major intersections ==
The entire highway is in Antrim County.

| Location | mi | km | Destinations | Notes |
|---|---|---|---|---|
| Eastport | 0.000 | 0.000 | US 31 / LMCT – Traverse City, Charlevoix, Petoskey | |
| Central Lake | 5.744 | 9.244 | C-65 (Ellsworth Road) – Charlevoix | |
| Mancelona | 26.215 | 42.189 | US 131 / M-66 (Williams Street) – Kalkaska, Cadillac, Petoskey C-38 east (State Street) – Otsego Lake | Roadway continues on State Street as C-38 |
1.000 mi = 1.609 km; 1.000 km = 0.621 mi
