= M87 =

M87 or M-87 may refer to:

== Military ==
- M87 machine gun, a Yugoslav copy of the NSVT machine gun
- M-87 Orkan, a Yugoslav rocket-artillery vehicle

== Transportation ==
- Tumansky M-87, a Soviet aircraft engine
- M-87 (Michigan highway), a former state highway in Michigan, US
- McDonnell Douglas MD-87, a passenger airplane

== Other uses ==
- Messier 87, a giant elliptical galaxy in the Virgo Cluster
  - M87*, a supermassive black hole at Messier 87's core
- M87 Ray (α and β), the signature move of the character Zoffy from the Ultra Series of television shows; See List of Ultraman Ginga characters
- "M87", the theme song for the 2022 film Shin Ultraman by Kenshi Yonezu.
