= Antrim County Courthouse =

- U.S. National Register of Historic Places
- Michigan State Historic Site
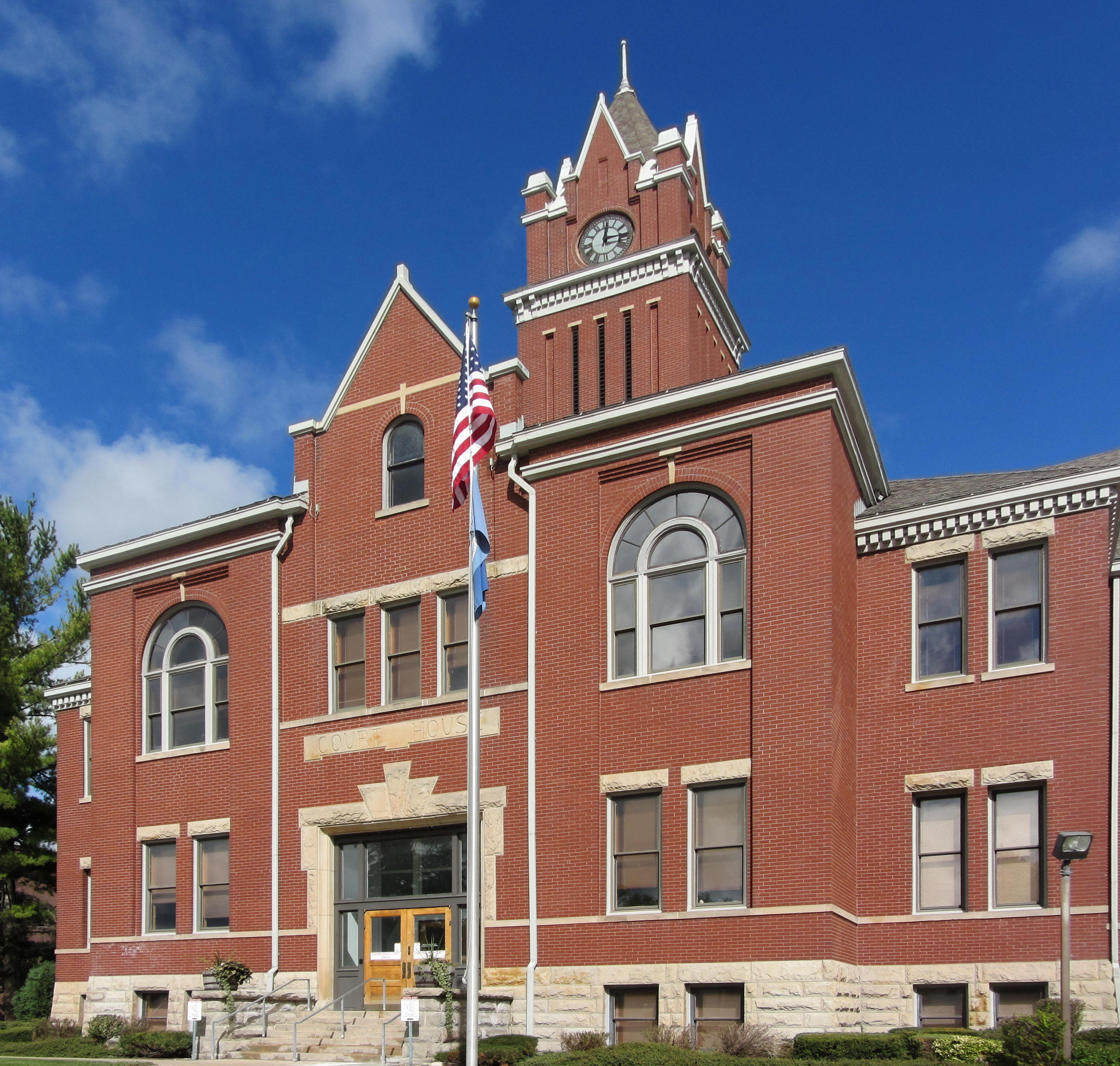

- Location within Michigan Location within the United States
- Interactive map showing the location of Antrim County Courthouse
- Location: S. Cayuga St., Bellaire, Michigan
- Coordinates: 44°58′33″N 85°12′29″W
- Area: 5 acres (2.0 ha)
- Built: 1904
- Built by: Waterman and Price
- Architect: Jens C. Peterson
- Architectural style: Late Victorian, Late Victorian Eclectic Vernacular
- NRHP reference No.: 80001846

Significant dates
- Added to NRHP: March 10, 1980
- Designated MSHS: April 5, 1974

The Antrim County Courthouse is a government building located on South Cayuga Street in Bellaire, Michigan (U.S.). It was designated a Michigan State Historic Site in 1974 and listed on the National Register of Historic Places in 1980. It was designed in 1879, but construction did not begin until 1904. As of 2014, it houses the Antrim County courts and prosecuting attorney.

== History ==
Antrim County was first laid out in 1840, although the first known settler did not arrive until 1846, when Abram S. Wadsworth began living near the location of what is now the Elk Rapids Township Hall. By 1860, there were still fewer than 150 people living in the county. However, Elk Rapids, the oldest settlement, was selected as the county seat, and in 1866 a small wooden courthouse was built there.

However, the county was quickly growing, and there was a push to move the county seat from Elk Rapids, which was located in one corner of the county, to a more central location. In 1879, in a close vote of the county populace, it was decided to move the county seat; the village of Bellaire was platted that same year. Land for the courthouse square was purchased, and a courthouse was designed by Traverse City architect Jens C. Peterson. However, the close vote spurred legal challenges, and the county seat selection was appealed all the way to the Michigan Supreme Court. This, and other related legal wrangling, delayed construction for 25 years. Temporary facilities in Bellaire were used until that time.

The county seat choice was eventually finalized after another vote, and this courthouse was built from Peterson's original plans by the firm of Waterman and Price in 1904–1905 at a cost of $30,000. A clock, manufactured by the E. Howard Company of Boston, was installed in 1921. A bell manufactured by the E. VanDuzen Company of Cincinnati was installed in 1922.

In 1977, a new courthouse was constructed to meet the growing needs of the community, and county offices moved the next year. There was some discussion of what to do with the 1905 courthouse, and it stood empty for 12 years. but in 1990, county voters approved $2.2 million for renovations. The county courts and prosecuting attorney took up residence in 1992.

== Description ==
The Antrim County Courthouse is a rectangular, 2 1/2-story, Late Victorian-eclectic, red-brick structure on a gray sandstone foundation with a hip roof and gray sandstone trim. The galvanized steel cornice has been painted and sanded to match the stone trim. A clock tower, over 100 feet (30 m) high, projects from the roof; a clock dial of 5 feet (1.5 m) in diameter is located at the top.
