= M-87 (Michigan highway) =

Former state highway in Genesee and Oakland counties in Michigan, United States

M-87
- M-87 highlighted in red on a modern map

Route information
- Maintained by MDOT
- Length: 11.564 mi (18.610 km)
- Existed: c. July 1, 1919–c. 1960

Major junctions
- West end: Bus. US 23 in Fenton
- East end: US 10 in Springfield Township

Location
- Country: United States
- State: Michigan
- Counties: Genesee, Oakland

Highway system
- Michigan State Trunkline Highway System; Interstate; US; State; Byways
← M-86	→ M-88

M-87 is the designation of a former state trunkline highway in the Lower Peninsula of the US state of Michigan, which prior to 1960 ran east–west between the towns of Fenton and Holly. The highway served as a connector between US Highway 23 (US 23) and the former routing of US 10, which ran along what is now the Interstate 75 (I-75) corridor. The highway connected the downtown areas of each community as well as running through then-rural areas of Genesee and Oakland counties. The trunkline was decommissioned in late 1960, removing it from the system.

== Route description ==
Immediately before decommissioning, M-87 began at a junction with Business US 23 (Bus. US 23, Leroy Street) east of the Shiawassee River in the town of Fenton. From there the road traveled to the east along Main Street, where it crossed a branch rail line of the present-day CSX Transportation and headed east out of town in Genesee County. After about one mile (1.6 km), the highway crossed into Oakland County and followed Grange Hall Road south of Seven Lakes State Park. The road then turned south in the town of Holly along Saginaw Street. Near Bevins Lake, the street curved to the east around the end of the lake. The highway turned east on Maple Street and ran south of Simonson Lake as it continued eastward out of Holly. The road crossed a branch line of the present day Canadian National Railway in Springfield Township. The trunkline continued to the east and southeast through rural areas before terminating at US 10 (Dixie Highway).

== History ==
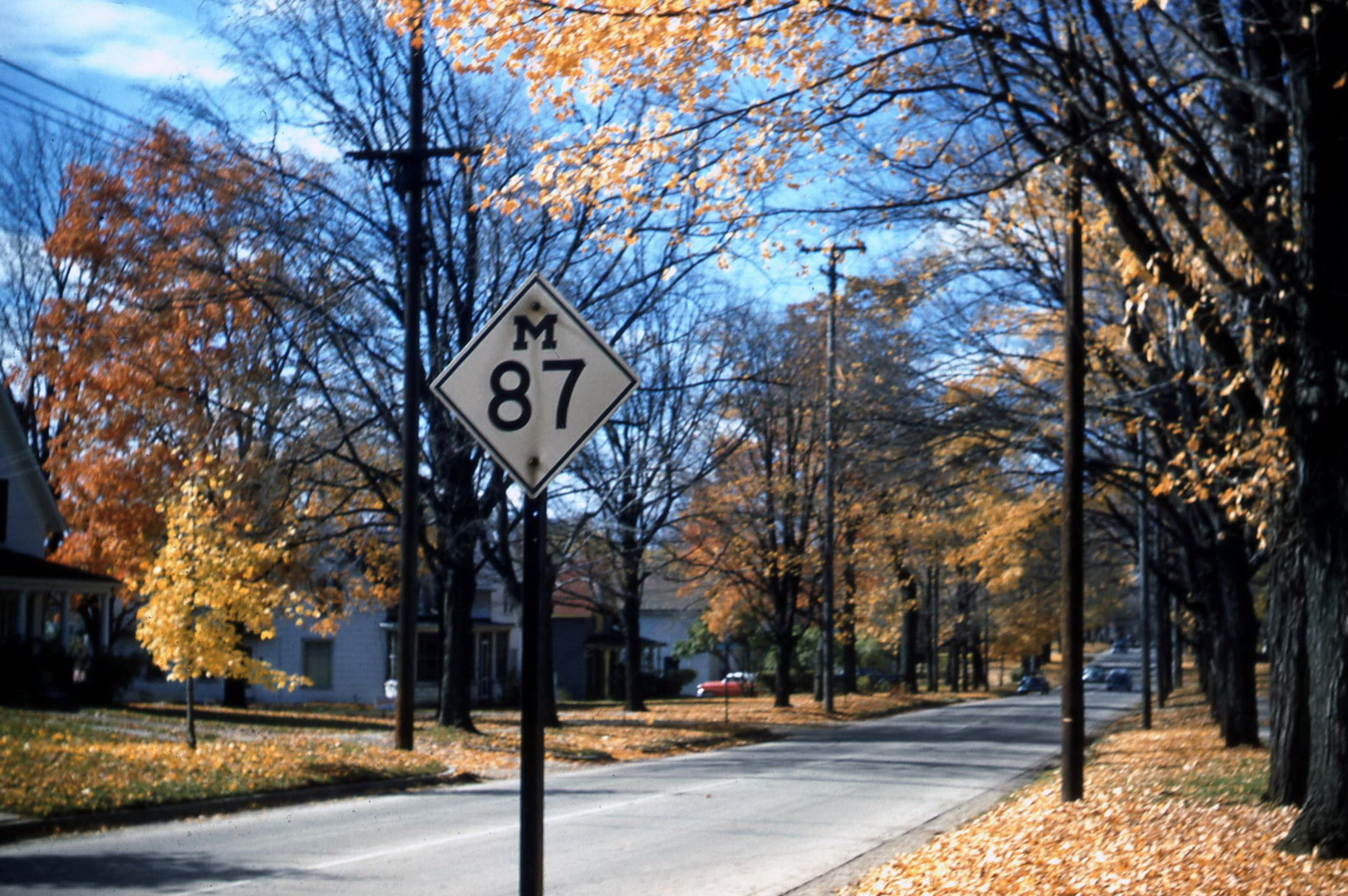
M-87 on November 1, 1956

M-87 was assumed into the state trunkline system by July 1, 1919, when the system was first signed. At the time, the highway connected M-65 in Fenton with M-10 east of Holly. Later when the United States Numbered Highway System was created on November 11, 1926, those two highways were renumbered US 23 and US 10 respectively. The highway was fully paved in 1937. In 1958, Fenton was bypassed by the Fenton–Clio Expressway to the west of downtown and the former route through downtown was redesignated Bus. US 23. M-87 was removed from the state trunkline system and turned back to local control in late 1960.

== Major intersections ==
County	Location	mi	km	Destinations	Notes
Genesee	Fenton	0.000	0.000	Bus. US 23 – Flint, Ann Arbor	Western terminus
Oakland	Springfield Township	11.564	18.610	US 10 – Flint, Detroit	Eastern terminus; present day Dixie Highway
1.000 mi = 1.609 km; 1.000 km = 0.621 mi
