= Bellaire, Michigan =

- Village
- Village of Bellaire
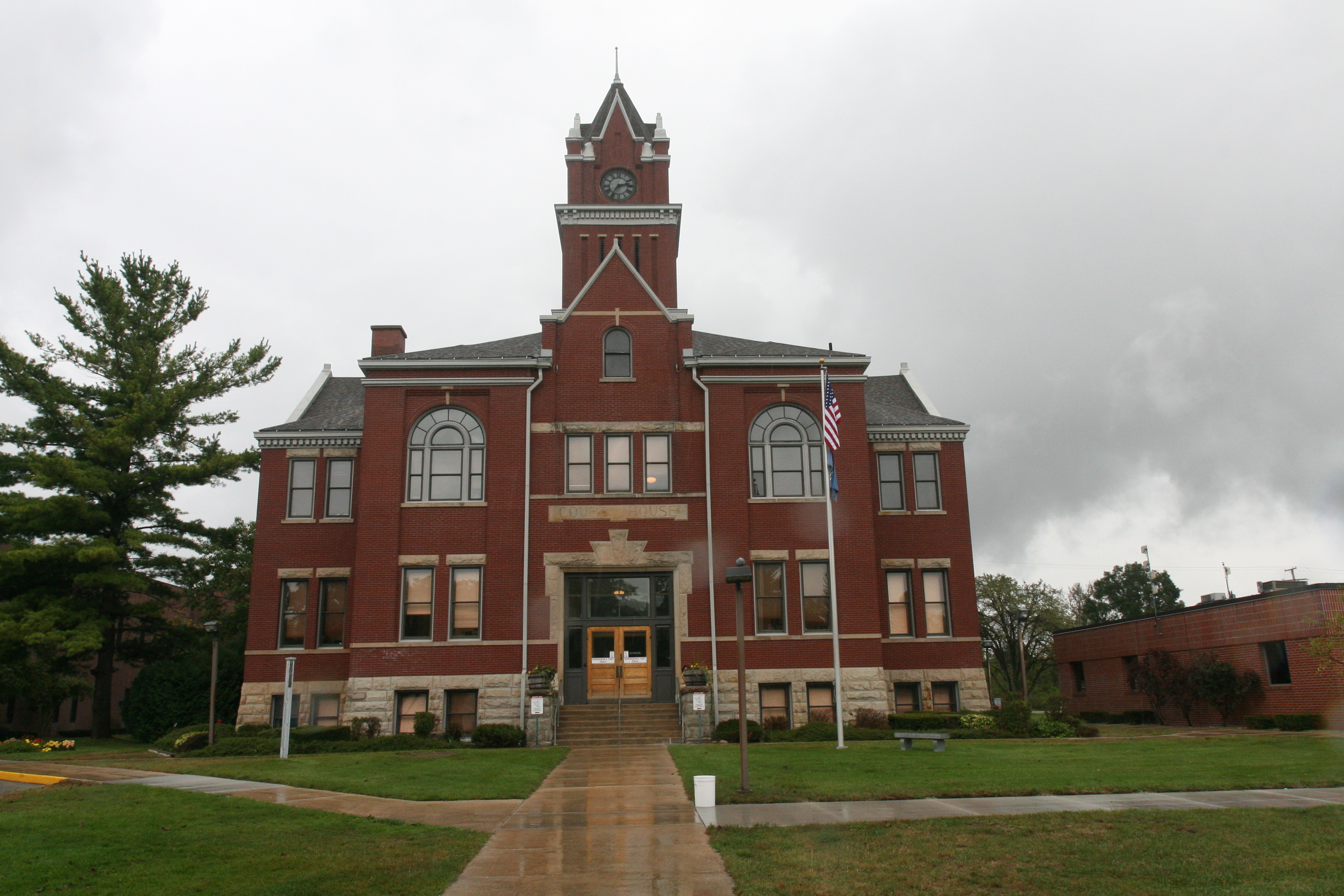
- Antrim County Courthouse in Bellaire

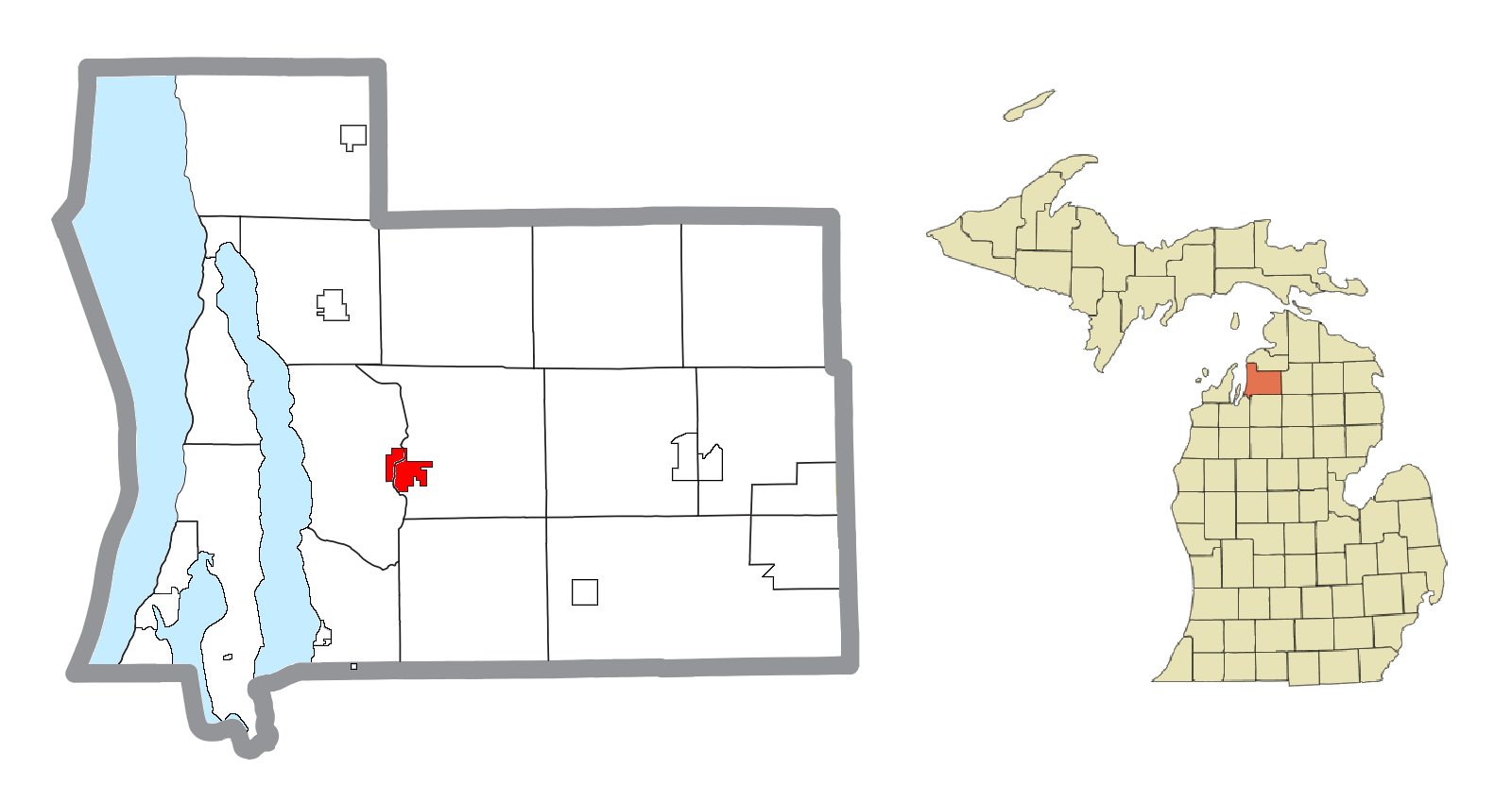
- Location within Antrim County

- Location within the state of Michigan Location within the United States
- Coordinates: 44°58′25″N 85°12′21″W
- Country: United States
- State: Michigan
- County: Antrim
- Townships: Forest Home and Kearney
- Settled: 1879
- Incorporated: 1891

Government
  - Type: Village council
  - President: Dan Bennett
  - Clerk: Angela St. Pierre
  - Treasurer: Nora Stead

Area
  - Total: 2.01 sq mi (5.21 km^{2})
  - Land: 1.87 sq mi (4.84 km^{2})
  - Water: 0.14 sq mi (0.37 km^{2})
- Elevation: 627 ft (191 m)

Population (2020)
  - Total: 1,053
  - Density: 563.8/sq mi (217.69/km^{2})
- Time zone: UTC-5 (Eastern (EST))
  - Summer (DST): UTC-4 (EDT)
- ZIP code(s): 49615
- Area code: 231
- FIPS code: 26-06980
- GNIS feature ID: 2398074
- Website: bellairemichigan.com

Bellaire (/ˈbɛlɛər/ BEL-air) is a village and the county seat of Antrim County, Michigan, United States. The population was 1,053 in 2020 census.

The village is split between Forest Home and Kearney townships. The historic Antrim County Courthouse is located in Bellaire. The Antrim Review, the county's newspaper of record, is headquartered in Bellaire.

== History ==
The Bellaire post office opened under the name Keno on June 20, 1879, and changed to Bellaire on May 26, 1880. Also, in 1880, Bellaire became the county seat of Antrim County, a position that Elk Rapids had previously had. The Chicago & West Michigan Railroad built a depot in Bellaire in 1891, and the East Jordan & Southern Railroad built another line into the town in 1901. For years, Bellaire was a major railroad center in Antrim County, so the town attracted many industrial corporations. For example, the wooden bowl company (which made wooded utensils) built a factory in Bellaire because of the ease of transportation. Bellaire remained a transportation center until 1962, when the East Jordan and Southern abandoned their trackage through Bellaire, and the Chesapeake & Ohio Railway (which was using the former Chicago and West Michigan line) followed suit in 1982. Bellaire is home to the Short's Brewing Company.

== Geography ==
The village is located on the boundary between Forest Home Township on the west and Kearney Township on the east, separated by the Intermediate River with the larger portion within Kearney Township. The Bellaire ZIP code, 49615, serves large portions of both townships, as well as portions of Central Lake Township to the north, Chestonia Township to the east, Custer Township to the south, and Helena Township to the southwest.

M-88 passes through the village, with Central Lake approximately 8 miles to the north and Mancelona approximately 10 miles to the southeast.

According to the United States Census Bureau, the village has a total area of 1.97 square miles (5.10 km^{2}), of which 1.84 square miles (4.77 km^{2}) is land and 0.13 square miles (0.34 km^{2}) is water.

== Demographics ==
Historical population
Census	Pop.	Note	%±
1880	65		—
1900	1,157		—
1910	1,050		−9.2%
1920	624		−40.6%
1930	517		−17.1%
1940	652		26.1%
1950	693		6.3%
1960	689		−0.6%
1970	897		30.2%
1980	1,063		18.5%
1990	1,104		3.9%
2000	1,164		5.4%
2010	1,086		−6.7%
2020	1,053		−3.0%
U.S. Decennial Census

=== 2010 census ===
As of the census of 2010, there were 1,086 people, 456 households, and 277 families residing in the village. The population density was 590.2 inhabitants per square mile (227.9/km^{2}). There were 549 housing units at an average density of 298.4 per square mile (115.2/km^{2}). The racial makeup of the village was 97.2% White, 0.1% African American, 0.7% Native American, 0.6% Asian, 0.5% from other races, and 0.9% from two or more races. Hispanic or Latino of any race were 2.4% of the population.

There were 456 households, of which 29.4% had children under the age of 18 living with them, 45.0% were married couples living together, 11.0% had a female householder with no husband present, 4.8% had a male householder with no wife present, and 39.3% were non-families. 33.8% of all households were made up of individuals, and 14.9% had someone living alone who was 65 years of age or older. The average household size was 2.29 and the average family size was 2.91.

The median age in the village was 42.2 years. 23.8% of residents were under the age of 18; 6.7% were between the ages of 18 and 24; 22.5% were from 25 to 44; 30.7% were from 45 to 64; and 16.3% were 65 years of age or older. The gender makeup of the village was 48.4% male and 51.6% female.

=== 2000 census ===
As of the census of 2000, there were 1,164 people, 489 households, and 315 families residing in the village. The population density was 636.1 inhabitants per square mile (245.6/km^{2}). There were 545 housing units at an average density of 297.8 per square mile (115.0/km^{2}). The racial makeup of the village was 97.25% White, 0.17% African American, 0.26% Native American, 0.34% Asian, 0.17% from other races, and 1.80% from two or more races. Hispanic or Latino of any race were 2.23% of the population.

There were 489 households, out of which 31.5% had children under the age of 18 living with them, 47.2% were married couples living together, 13.7% had a female householder with no husband present, and 35.4% were non-families. 30.5% of all households were made up of individuals, and 10.8% had someone living alone who was 65 years of age or older. The average household size was 2.26 and the average family size was 2.80.

In the village, the population was spread out, with 24.1% under the age of 18, 8.8% from 18 to 24, 29.4% from 25 to 44, 24.2% from 45 to 64, and 13.5% who were 65 years of age or older. The median age was 38 years. For every 100 females, there were 94.3 males. For every 100 females age 18 and over, there were 91.1 males.

The median income for a household in the village was $32,243, and the median income for a family was $44,625. Males had a median income of $31,950 versus $20,893 for females. The per capita income for the village was $18,327. About 3.0% of families and 5.5% of the population were below the poverty line, including 4.3% of those under age 18 and 2.9% of those age 65 or over.
