= Adjusted cost base =

Adjusted cost base (ACB) is used in the Canadian tax system to refer to the cost of an investment adjusted for several tax-related items including acquisition costs. It is used in the calculation of capital gains or losses.

== Calculation ==
=== For Stocks, ETFs, Mutual Funds and Bonds ===
Total ACB:

$$\text{Initial investment}+\text{Additional contributions}+\text{Fees and commissions}-\text{Any previous sales or redemptions}$$

ACB can also be presented as ACB per unit:

$$\frac{\text{Initial investment}+\text{Additional contributions}+\text{Fees and commissions}-\text{Any previous sales or redemptions}}{\text{Total number of units currently held}}$$

Note: Additional contributions includes any reinvested distributions.

An increase in the ACB will reduce the amount of capital gains realized at time of disposition. Mutual fund front end or deferred sales charges are treated like purchase and sale commissions for tax purposes.

=== For Selling Physical Property ===
Capital improvements made to a property are added to the ACB of that property. Capital improvements generally extend the life of a property and specifically exclude routine repairs and maintenance.

Acquisition costs such as legal fees, land transfer tax, land surveys and property inspections increase the ACB of a property. Interest paid on debt used to acquire vacant land is added to the ACB of the land.

== Phantom distributions ==
An exchange-traded fund (ETF) may choose to reinvest some of its realized capital gains instead of paying the money out as a distribution to unit holders. This incurs a taxable capital gain for unit holders and must be added to the ACB of the ETF to prevent double taxation.

== See also ==
- Adjusted basis - Equivalent term in the United States.
- Canada Revenue Agency
- Capital gain
