= Antrim County Airport =

Airport in Michigan, United States

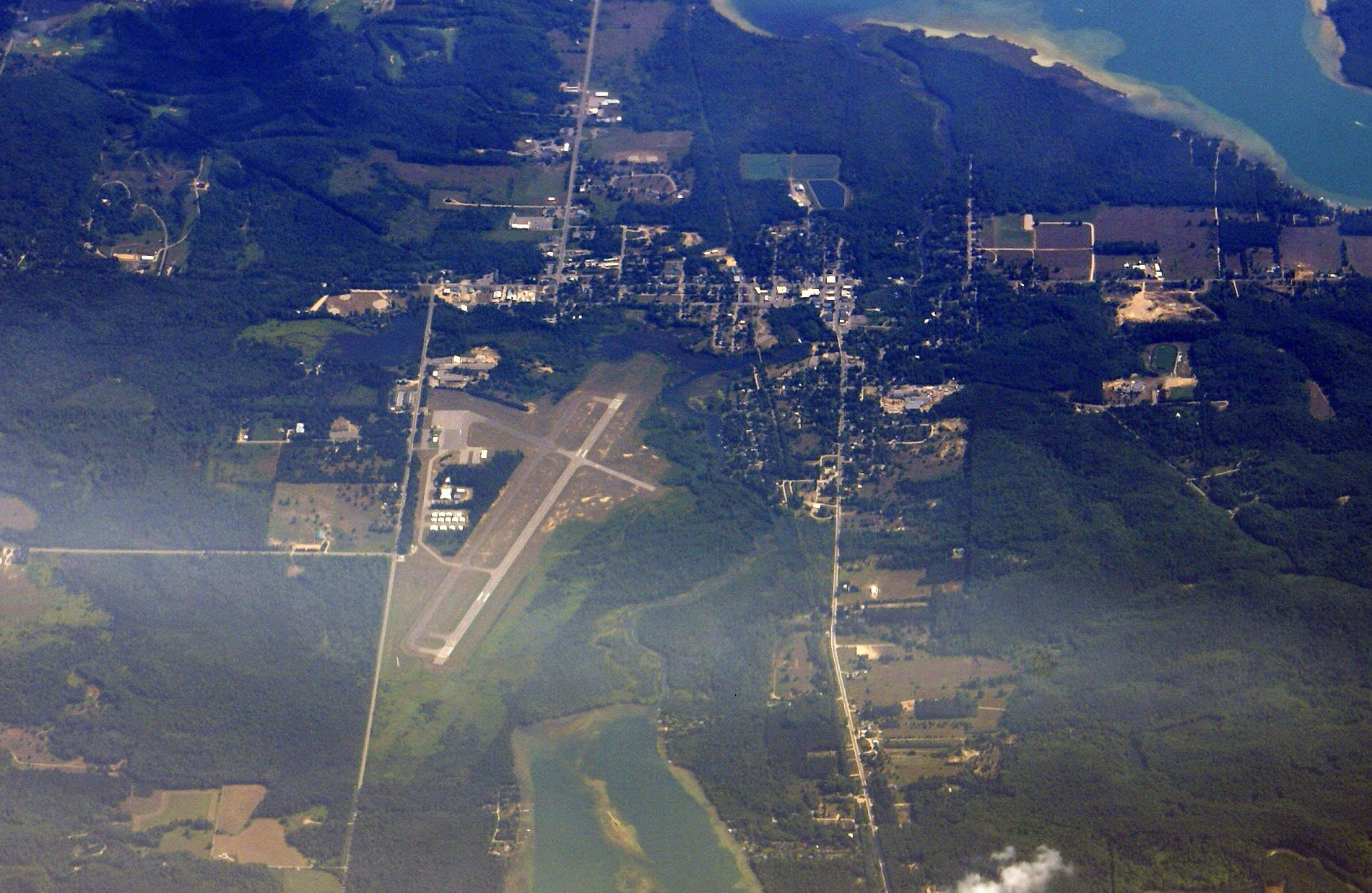
- IATA: ACB; ICAO: KACB; FAA LID: ACB

Summary
- Airport type: Public
- Owner: Antrim County
- Serves: Bellaire, Michigan
- Elevation AMSL: 623 ft (190 m)
- Coordinates: 44°59′19″N 085°11′54″W

Map
- Location of airport in Michigan ACB (the United States)

Runways
Direction	Length		Surface
Direction	ft	m	Surface
02/20	5,003	1,525	Asphalt

Statistics (2022)
- Aircraft operations: 7,276
- Source: Federal Aviation Administration

Antrim County Airport (IATA: ACB, ICAO: KACB, FAA LID: ACB) is a county-owned public-use airport located 1 mile (1.6 km) northeast of the central business district of Bellaire, Michigan, United States. It is included in the Federal Aviation Administration (FAA) National Plan of Integrated Airport Systems for 2017–2021, in which it is categorized as a local general aviation facility.

== Facilities and aircraft ==
Antrim County Airport covers an area of 363 acres (147 ha), which contains one asphalt paved runway (02/20) measuring 5,003 x 100 ft (1,525 x 30 m).

For the 12-month period ending December 31, 2022, the airport had 7,276 aircraft operations, an average of 20 per day. It was all general aviation. At that time, there were 24 airplanes based on the field: 21 single-engine and 3 multi-engine.

The airport has a fixed-base operator that sells fuel and has a conference room.

== See also ==
- List of airports in Michigan
