= Eastport, Michigan =

- Census-designated place (CDP) & unincorporated community
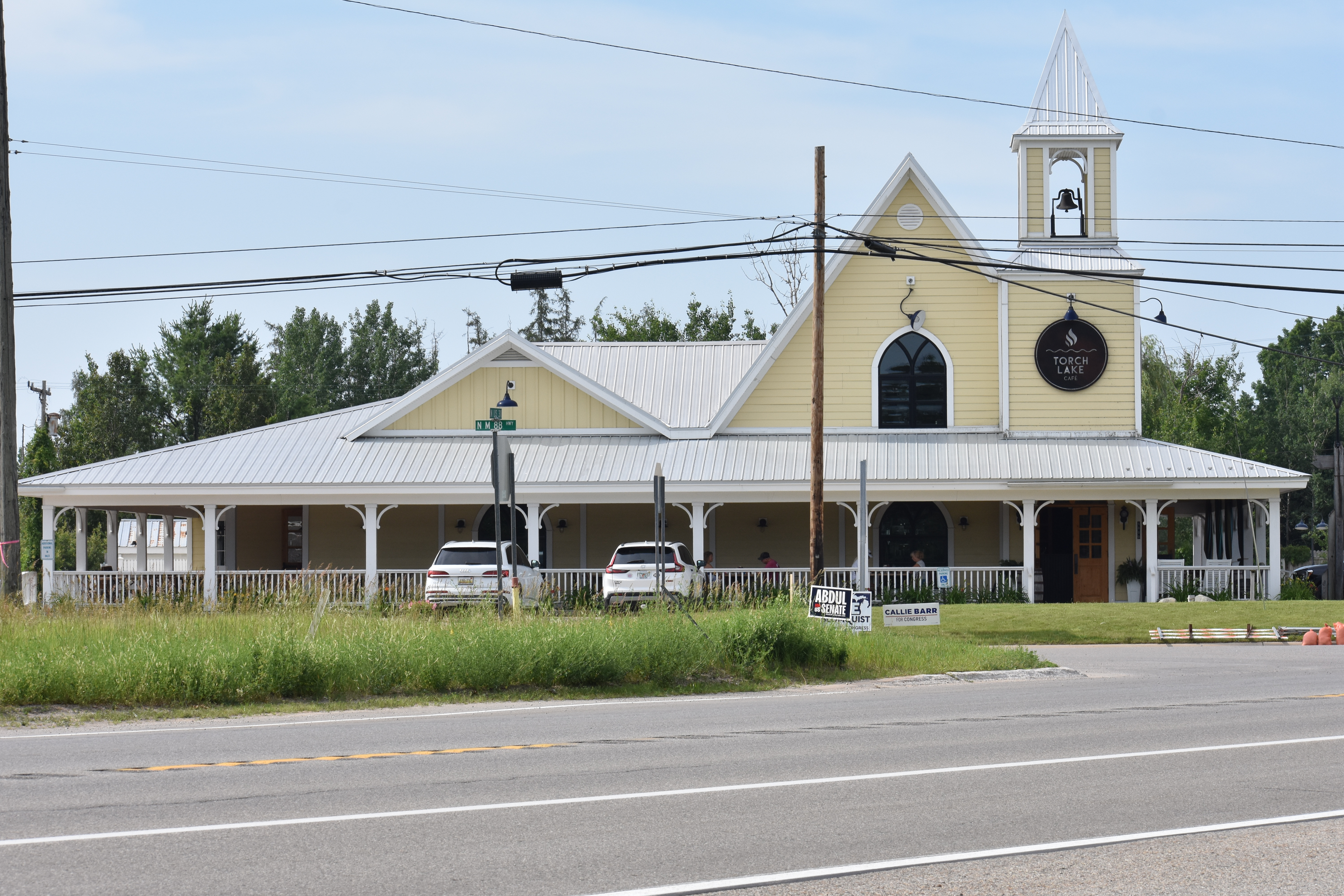
- The Torch Lake Cafe in Eastport

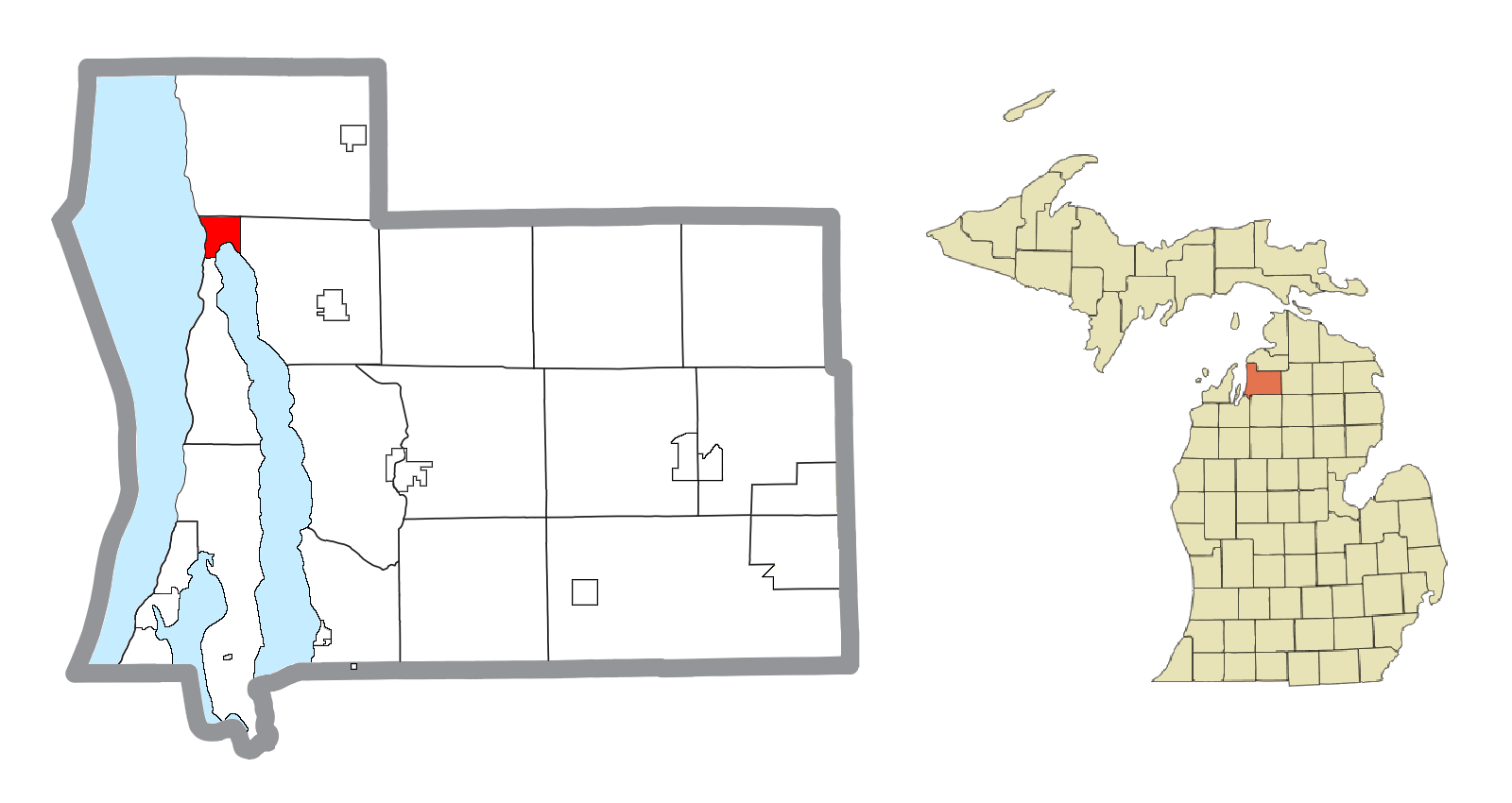
- Location within Antrim County

- Location within the state of Michigan Eastport (the United States)
- Coordinates: 45°06′26″N 85°21′00″W
- Country: United States
- State: Michigan
- County: Antrim County
- Township: Torch Lake
- Settled: 1863

Area
  - Total: 2.00 sq mi (5.18 km^{2})
  - Land: 1.99 sq mi (5.15 km^{2})
  - Water: 0.012 sq mi (0.03 km^{2})
- Elevation: 607 ft (185 m)

Population (2020)
  - Total: 206
  - Density: 103.2/sq mi (39.85/km^{2})
- Time zone: UTC-5 (Eastern (EST))
  - Summer (DST): UTC-4 (EDT)
- ZIP code(s): 49627
- Area code: 231
- FIPS code: 26-24300
- GNIS feature ID: 625301

Eastport is an unincorporated community and census-designated place (CDP) located in Antrim County in the U.S. state of Michigan. The population of the CDP was 206 at the 2020 census. It is located in Torch Lake Township, and lies on an isthmus between Torch Lake and Grand Traverse Bay.

== History ==
The area was settled by lumberman Murdock Andress in 1863, and a hotel was built in 1869. A post office named Wilson opened on March 29, 1872. It was renamed Eastport on September 8, 1873. The community became a popular shipping area along the east coast Grand Traverse Bay and the northern shores of Torch Lake. The name Eastport was derived from its eastern location along the bay, which was directly across the bay from Northport.

The community of Eastport was listed as a newly-organized census-designated place for the 2010 census, meaning it now has officially defined boundaries and population statistics for the first time.

== Geography ==
According to the U.S. Census Bureau, the Eastport CDP has a total area of 2.00 square miles (5.18 km^{2}), of which 1.99 square miles (5.15 km^{2}) is land and 0.01 square miles (0.03 km^{2}) (0.50%) is water.

Eastport is located at the northern tip of Torch Lake, Michigan's second-largest inland lake. The community also has a shoreline on Grand Traverse Bay, a large arm of Lake Michigan.

=== Major highways ===
- US 31 is a north-south route that runs through the community.
- M-88 is an east-west route with its western terminus in the community.

== Demographics ==
Historical population
Census	Pop.	Note	%±
2010	218		—
2020	206		−5.5%
U.S. Decennial Census
