= Central Lake Township, Michigan =

- Civil township
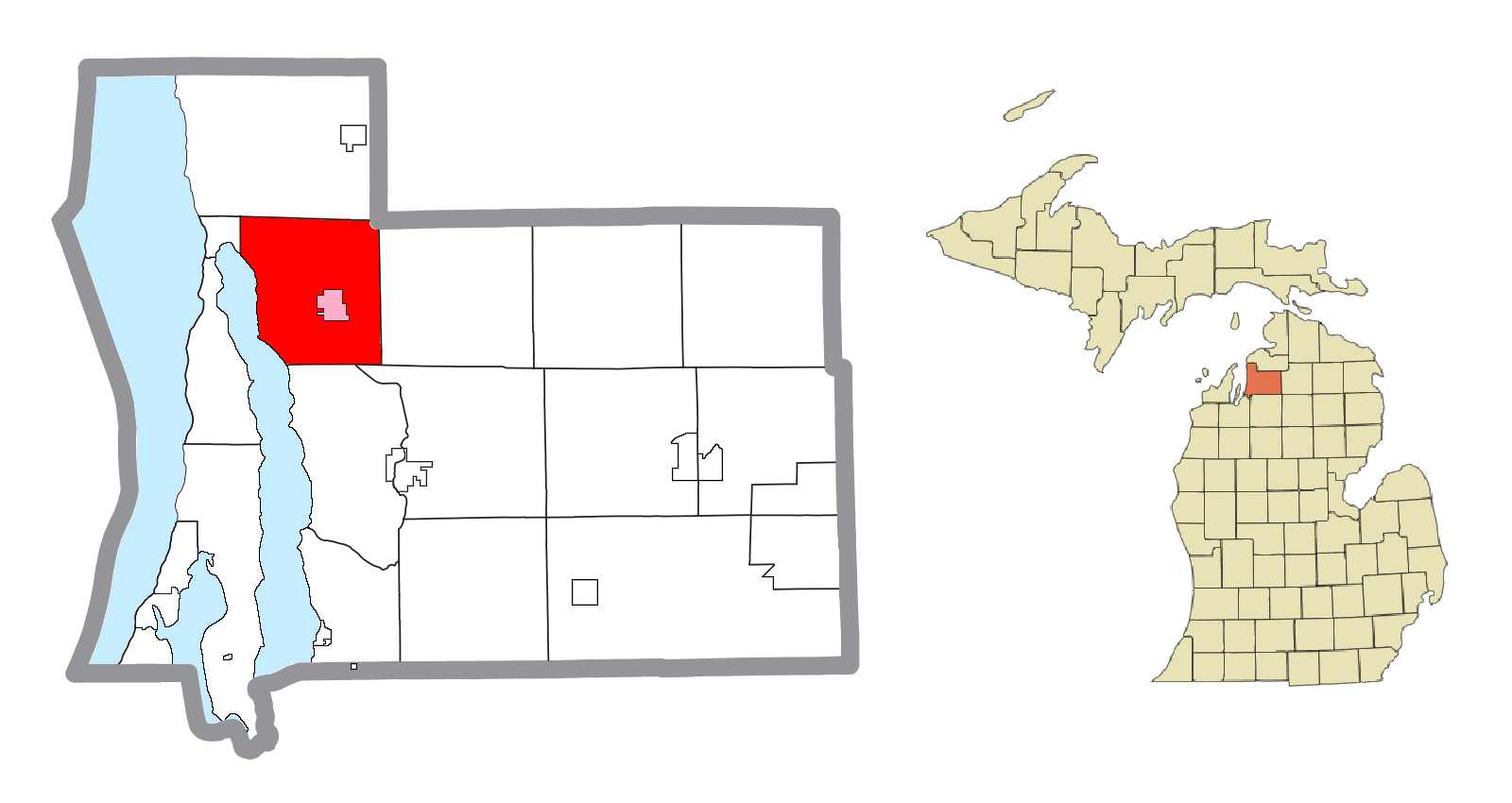
- Location within Antrim County (red) and the administered village of Central Lake (pink)

- Location within the state of Michigan Central Lake Township (the United States)
- Coordinates: 45°04′27″N 85°16′09″W
- Country: United States
- State: Michigan
- County: Antrim

Government
  - Supervisor: Stanley Bean
  - Clerk: Judith Kosloski

Area
  - Total: 31.3 sq mi (81.1 km^{2})
  - Land: 27.5 sq mi (71.2 km^{2})
  - Water: 3.8 sq mi (9.8 km^{2})
- Elevation: 764 ft (233 m)

Population (2020)
  - Total: 2,159
  - Density: 78.5/sq mi (30.3/km^{2})
- Time zone: UTC-5 (Eastern (EST))
  - Summer (DST): UTC-4 (EDT)
- ZIP code(s): 49622 (Central Lake)
- Area code: 231
- FIPS code: 26-14420
- GNIS feature ID: 1626054
- Website: Official website

Central Lake Township is a civil township of Antrim County in the U.S. state of Michigan. The population was 2,159 at the 2020 census. The village of Central Lake is located within the township.

== Geography ==
According to the United States Census Bureau, the township has a total area of 31.3 square miles (81.1 km^{2}), of which 27.5 square miles (71.2 km^{2}) is land and 3.8 square miles (9.8 km^{2}), or 12.14%, is water.

== Demographics ==
As of the census of 2000, there were 2,254 people, 921 households, and 661 families residing in the township. The population density was 81.7 inhabitants per square mile (31.5/km^{2}). There were 1,479 housing units at an average density of 53.6 per square mile (20.7/km^{2}). The racial makeup of the township was 97.74% White, 1.20% Native American, 0.09% Asian, 0.13% from other races, and 0.84% from two or more races. Hispanic or Latino of any race were 0.40% of the population.

There were 921 households, out of which 27.9% had children under the age of 18 living with them, 60.5% were married couples living together, 8.4% had a female householder with no husband present, and 28.2% were non-families. 23.6% of all households were made up of individuals, and 9.6% had someone living alone who was 65 years of age or older. The average household size was 2.41 and the average family size was 2.81.

In the township the population was spread out, with 22.5% under the age of 18, 6.3% from 18 to 24, 26.7% from 25 to 44, 26.6% from 45 to 64, and 17.9% who were 65 years of age or older. The median age was 42 years. For every 100 females, there were 100.4 males. For every 100 females age 18 and over, there were 98.2 males.

The median income for a household in the township was $38,750, and the median income for a family was $42,629. Males had a median income of $34,449 versus $22,321 for females. The per capita income for the township was $19,040. About 5.4% of families and 8.6% of the population were below the poverty line, including 8.6% of those under age 18 and 4.9% of those age 65 or over.
