= Central Lake, Michigan =

- Village
- Village of Central Lake
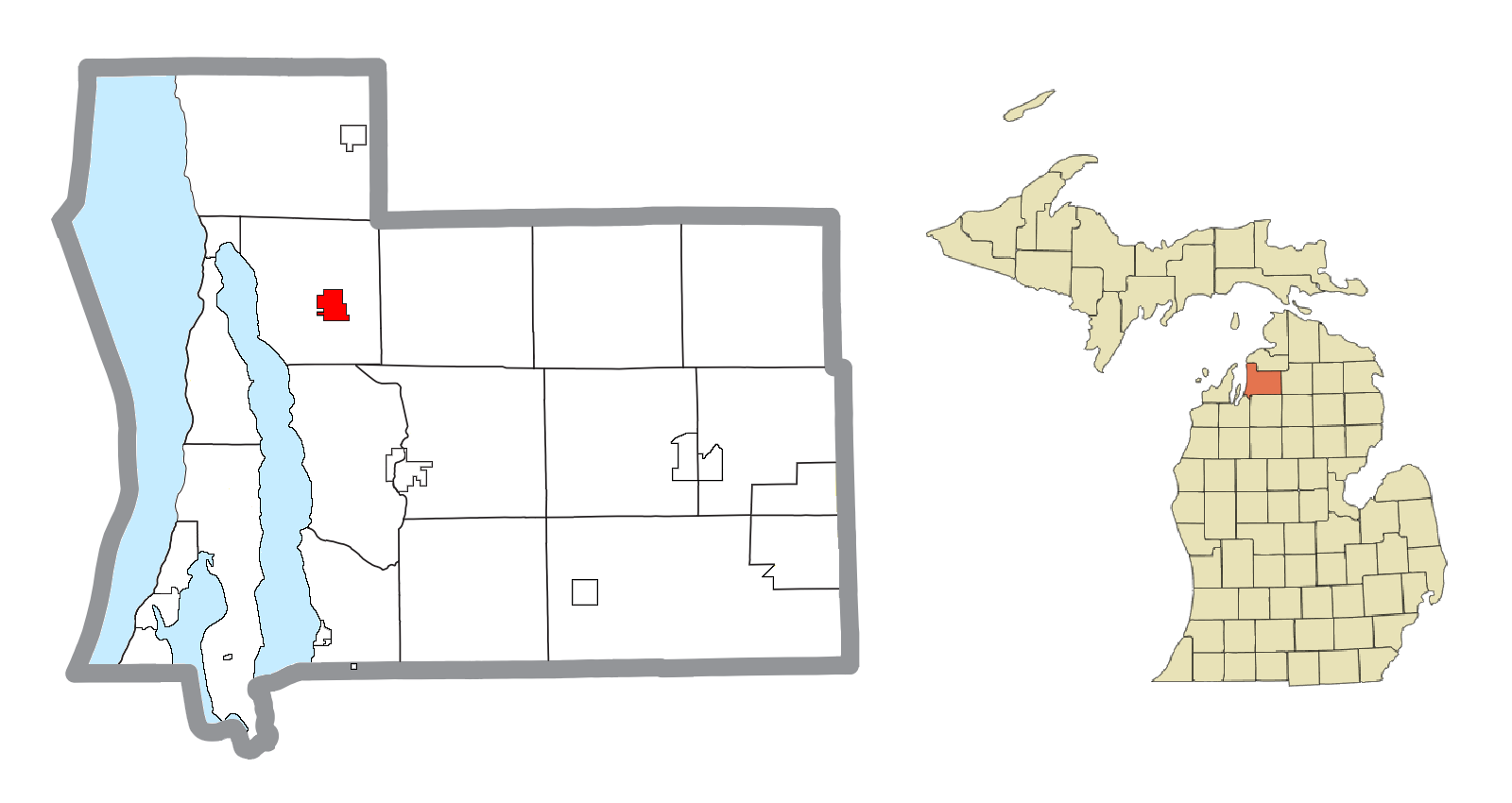
- Location within Antrim County

- Location within the state of Michigan
- Coordinates: 45°04′08″N 85°15′39″W
- Country: United States
- State: Michigan
- County: Antrim
- Township: Central Lake
- Platted: 1883
- Incorporated: 1895

Government
  - Type: Village council
  - President: Larry Eckhardt
  - Clerk: Racheal Antaya

Area
  - Total: 1.29 sq mi (3.33 km^{2})
  - Land: 1.11 sq mi (2.88 km^{2})
  - Water: 0.17 sq mi (0.45 km^{2})
- Elevation: 646 ft (197 m)

Population (2020)
  - Total: 960
  - Density: 864.2/sq mi (333.68/km^{2})
- Time zone: UTC-5 (Eastern (EST))
  - Summer (DST): UTC-4 (EDT)
- ZIP code(s): 49622
- Area code: 231
- FIPS code: 26-14400
- GNIS feature ID: 0623004
- Website: www.centrallakemi.org

Central Lake is a village in Antrim County in the U.S. state of Michigan. The population was 960 at the 2020 census. The village is located within Central Lake Township.

Central Lake is situated on a lake which is in the center of a chain of lakes and rivers in the county, hence the name.

== History ==
Central Lake was given a post office in 1869. James M. Wadsworth started a store here in 1872. The village was platted in 1883. The Chicago and Western Railroad put a depot in Central Lake in 1892. It was incorporated as a village in 1895.

== Geography ==
According to the United States Census Bureau, the village has a total area of 1.25 square miles (3.24 km^{2}), of which, 1.07 square miles (2.77 km^{2}) is land and 0.18 square miles (0.47 km^{2}) is water.

=== Climate ===
This climatic region has large seasonal temperature differences, with warm to hot (and often humid) summers and cold (sometimes severely cold) winters. According to the Köppen Climate Classification system, Central Lake has a humid continental climate, abbreviated "Dfb" on climate maps.

Climate data for Central Lake, Michigan
Month	Jan	Feb	Mar	Apr	May	Jun	Jul	Aug	Sep	Oct	Nov	Dec	Year
Mean daily maximum °C (°F)	−2 (29)	−1 (31)	4 (40)	12 (54)	20 (68)	25 (77)	27 (81)	26 (79)	22 (71)	15 (59)	7 (45)	1 (33)	13 (56)
Mean daily minimum °C (°F)	−10 (14)	−12 (11)	−7 (19)	−1 (31)	5 (41)	10 (50)	13 (55)	12 (54)	9 (48)	4 (39)	−1 (30)	−7 (20)	1 (34)
Average precipitation cm (inches)	5.1 (2)	3.0 (1.2)	3.8 (1.5)	6.1 (2.4)	7.4 (2.9)	7.6 (3)	7.1 (2.8)	8.4 (3.3)	10 (4)	8.6 (3.4)	7.9 (3.1)	5.6 (2.2)	81 (31.8)
Source: Weatherbase

== Demographics ==
Historical population
Census	Pop.	Note	%±
1900	1,307		—
1910	813		−37.8%
1920	676		−16.9%
1930	607		−10.2%
1940	659		8.6%
1950	692		5.0%
1960	692		0.0%
1970	741		7.1%
1980	895		20.8%
1990	954		6.6%
2000	990		3.8%
2010	952		−3.8%
2020	960		0.8%
U.S. Decennial Census

=== 2010 census ===
As of the census of 2010, there were 952 people, 387 households, and 253 families living in the village. The population density was 889.7 inhabitants per square mile (343.5/km^{2}). There were 549 housing units at an average density of 513.1 per square mile (198.1/km^{2}). The racial makeup of the village was 96.0% White, 0.1% African American, 0.9% Native American, 0.3% Asian, 0.3% from other races, and 2.3% from two or more races. Hispanic or Latino of any race were 1.4% of the population.

There were 387 households, of which 32.6% had children under the age of 18 living with them, 43.9% were married couples living together, 15.5% had a female householder with no husband present, 5.9% had a male householder with no wife present, and 34.6% were non-families. 28.4% of all households were made up of individuals, and 13.2% had someone living alone who was 65 years of age or older. The average household size was 2.44 and the average family size was 2.88.

The median age in the village was 42 years. 23.4% of residents were under the age of 18; 7.1% were between the ages of 18 and 24; 23.7% were from 25 to 44; 30.7% were from 45 to 64; and 15.1% were 65 years of age or older. The gender makeup of the village was 48.4% male and 51.6% female.

=== 2000 census ===
As of the census of 2000, there were 990 people, 388 households, and 261 families living in the village. The population density was 944.8 inhabitants per square mile (364.8/km^{2}). There were 483 housing units at an average density of 460.9 per square mile (178.0/km^{2}). The racial makeup of the village was 97.58% White, 1.62% Native American, and 0.81% from two or more races. Hispanic or Latino of any race were 0.51% of the population.

There were 388 households, out of which 31.4% had children under the age of 18 living with them, 54.4% were married couples living together, 8.8% had a female householder with no husband present, and 32.7% were non-families. 27.3% of all households were made up of individuals, and 9.5% had someone living alone who was 65 years of age or older. The average household size was 2.47 and the average family size was 2.97.

In the village, the population was spread out, with 25.1% under the age of 18, 7.6% from 18 to 24, 28.4% from 25 to 44, 23.2% from 45 to 64, and 15.8% who were 65 years of age or older. The median age was 39 years. For every 100 females, there were 99.6 males. For every 100 females age 18 and over, there were 96.3 males.

The median income for a household in the village was $38,173, and the median income for a family was $44,167. Males had a median income of $34,022 versus $20,833 for females. The per capita income for the village was $18,133. About 7.3% of families and 12.2% of the population were below the poverty line, including 12.9% of those under age 18 and 6.5% of those age 65 or over.
